= 1911 Penn Quakers football team =

American college football season

1911 Penn Quakers football
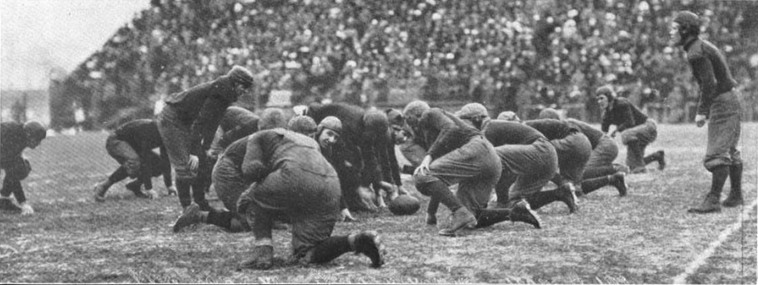
- Conference: Independent
- Record: 7–4
- Head coach: Andy Smith (3rd season)
- Captain: Leroy Mercer
- Home stadium: Franklin Field

1911 Eastern college football independents records
	Conf.			Overall
Team	W	L	T	W		L		T
Penn State		–		8	–	0	–	1
Carlisle		–		11	–	1	–	0
Princeton		–		8	–	0	–	2
Trinity (CT)		–		6	–	0	–	2
Temple		–		6	–	1	–	0
Army		–		6	–	1	–	1
Swarthmore		–		6	–	1	–	1
Dartmouth		–		8	–	2	–	0
Lafayette		–		8	–	2	–	0
Yale		–		7	–	2	–	1
Harvard		–		6	–	2	–	1
Cornell		–		7	–	3	–	0
Rhode Island State		–		5	–	2	–	1
Brown		–		7	–	3	–	1
Bucknell		–		6	–	3	–	1
Penn		–		7	–	4	–	0
Pittsburgh		–		4	–	3	–	1
Washington & Jefferson		–		6	–	4	–	0
Syracuse		–		5	–	3	–	2
Dickinson		–		4	–	4	–	0
Lehigh		–		5	–	5	–	1
Rutgers		–		4	–	4	–	1
Dickinson		–		4	–	4	–	0
St. Bonaventure		–		2	–	2	–	0
Carnegie Tech		–		4	–	5	–	0
Holy Cross		–		4	–	5	–	0
Tufts		–		3	–	4	–	0
Vermont		–		3	–	5	–	0
NYU		–		1	–	3	–	3
Colgate		–		3	–	6	–	0
Franklin & Marshall		–		3	–	6	–	0
New Hampshire		–		1	–	5	–	1
Geneva		–		1	–	6	–	1
Villanova		–		0	–	5	–	1
Boston College		–		0	–	7	–	0

The 1911 Penn Quakers football team was an American football team that represented the University of Pennsylvania as an independent during the 1911 college football season. In their third season under head coach Andy Smith, the Quakers compiled a 7–4 record and outscored opponents by a total of 131 to 83. Fullback Leroy Mercer was selected as a first-team All-American by Tommy Clark and Wilton S. Farnsworth.

== Schedule ==
Date	Opponent	Site	Result	Attendance	Source
September 30	Gettysburg	Franklin Field; Philadelphia, PA	W 5–3		
October 4	Franklin & Marshall	Franklin Field; Philadelphia, PA	W 14–0		
October 7	Ursinus	Franklin Field; Philadelphia, PA	W 9–0		
October 11	Dickinson	Franklin Field; Philadelphia, PA	W 22–10		
October 14	Villanova	Franklin Field; Philadelphia, PA	W 22–0		
October 21	Brown	Franklin Field; Philadelphia, PA	L 0–6		
October 28	Penn State	Franklin Field; Philadelphia, PA	L 6–22	15,000	
November 4	Carlisle	Franklin Field; Philadelphia, PA	L 0–16		
November 11	Lafayette	Franklin Field; Philadelphia, PA	W 23–6		
November 13	at Michigan	Ferry Field; Ann Arbor, MI	L 9–11	17,000	
November 30	Cornell	Franklin Field; Philadelphia, PA (rivalry)	W 21–9		
