= 1911 St. Bonaventure Brown and White football team =

American college football season

1911 St. Bonaventure Brown and White football
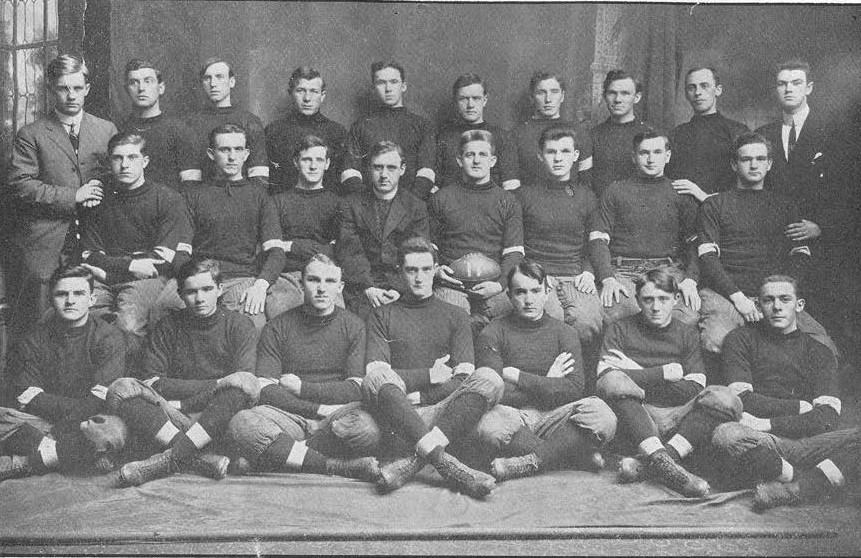
- The 1911 St. Bonaventure football team
- Conference: Independent
- Record: 2–2
- Head coach: Daniel Pickett (1st season)
- Captain: Daniel Pickett

1911 Eastern college football independents records
| | Conf. | | | Overall |
| Team | W | L | T | W | | L | | T |
|---|---|---|---|---|---|---|---|---|
| Penn State | | – | | 8 | – | 0 | – | 1 |
| Carlisle | | – | | 11 | – | 1 | – | 0 |
| Princeton | | – | | 8 | – | 0 | – | 2 |
| Trinity (CT) | | – | | 6 | – | 0 | – | 2 |
| Temple | | – | | 6 | – | 1 | – | 0 |
| Army | | – | | 6 | – | 1 | – | 1 |
| Swarthmore | | – | | 6 | – | 1 | – | 1 |
| Dartmouth | | – | | 8 | – | 2 | – | 0 |
| Lafayette | | – | | 8 | – | 2 | – | 0 |
| Yale | | – | | 7 | – | 2 | – | 1 |
| Harvard | | – | | 6 | – | 2 | – | 1 |
| Cornell | | – | | 7 | – | 3 | – | 0 |
| Rhode Island State | | – | | 5 | – | 2 | – | 1 |
| Brown | | – | | 7 | – | 3 | – | 1 |
| Bucknell | | – | | 6 | – | 3 | – | 1 |
| Penn | | – | | 7 | – | 4 | – | 0 |
| Pittsburgh | | – | | 4 | – | 3 | – | 1 |
| Washington & Jefferson | | – | | 6 | – | 4 | – | 0 |
| Syracuse | | – | | 5 | – | 3 | – | 2 |
| Dickinson | | – | | 4 | – | 4 | – | 0 |
| Lehigh | | – | | 5 | – | 5 | – | 1 |
| Rutgers | | – | | 4 | – | 4 | – | 1 |
| Dickinson | | – | | 4 | – | 4 | – | 0 |
| St. Bonaventure | | – | | 2 | – | 2 | – | 0 |
| Carnegie Tech | | – | | 4 | – | 5 | – | 0 |
| Holy Cross | | – | | 4 | – | 5 | – | 0 |
| Tufts | | – | | 3 | – | 4 | – | 0 |
| Vermont | | – | | 3 | – | 5 | – | 0 |
| NYU | | – | | 1 | – | 3 | – | 3 |
| Colgate | | – | | 3 | – | 6 | – | 0 |
| Franklin & Marshall | | – | | 3 | – | 6 | – | 0 |
| New Hampshire | | – | | 1 | – | 5 | – | 1 |
| Geneva | | – | | 1 | – | 6 | – | 1 |
| Villanova | | – | | 0 | – | 5 | – | 1 |
| Boston College | | – | | 0 | – | 7 | – | 0 |

The 1911 St. Bonaventure Brown and White football team represented St. Bonaventure University during the 1911 college football season. Under first-year head coach and captain Daniel Pickett, the St. Bonaventure eleven compiled a 2–2 record, and were outscored by their opponents 80 to 11. They posted two shutouts, against Bradford, and Lebanon Valley, while themselves being shut out twice by two college football powerhouses, undefeated co-national champion Penn State (NCF), and a Notre Dame team that went undefeated, and outscored their opponents 222 to 9. Nicknames for the football team included the Brown and White, as that was their school colors, and the Alleganians, given St. Bonaventure's proximity to Allegany, New York.

St. Bonaventure also fielded a reserve team, captained by Donovan, and defeated Renovo 20 to 5 on November 11. Of the 11 points amassed by the football team, ten were scored by halfback Clare, while fullback Regan completed one extra point in the contest against Bradford.

== Schedule ==
| Date | Opponent | Site | Result | Source |
|---|---|---|---|---|
| October 14 | Bradford AC | Bradford, PA | W 6–0 | |
| October 21 | vs. Lebanon Valley | City Fair Grounds; Olean, NY | W 5–0 | |
| November 4 | at Penn State | New Beaver Field; State College, PA | L 0–46 | |
| November 11 | at Notre Dame | Cartier Field; Notre Dame, IN | L 0–34 | |

== Reserves schedule ==
| Date | Opponent | Site | Result |
|---|---|---|---|
| November 11 | Renovo | College gridiron; Allegany, NY | W 20–5 |

== Roster ==
1911 St. Bonaventure Varsity Roster
| Quarterback: O'Neill – Bradford, Lebanon Valley, Penn State, Notre Dame; Right ends: Quinn – Bradford, Lebanon Valley; Blair – Penn State; Left end: Blair – Bradford, Lebanon Valley, Notre Dame; Right tackles: Kenyon – Penn State, Notre Dame; Weberton – Bradford; Carnish – Lebanon Valley | Left tackles: Kenyon – Bradford, Lebanon Valley; Weberton – Penn State; Bosque – Notre Dame; Right guards: Carnish – Penn State, Notre Dame; Palford – Bradford; Kelly – Lebanon Valley; Weberton – Lebanon Valley; Left guards: Kelly – Penn State, Notre Dame; Pronto – Bradford; Weberton – Notre Dame; Gianelli – Lebanon Valley | Centers: Pronto – Penn State, Notre Dame; Kelly – Bradford; Eustace – Lebanon Valley, Notre Dame; Right half backs: Clare – Bradford, Lebanon Valley, Notre Dame; Pickett – Penn State; Left half backs: Pickett – Bradford, Lebanon Valley, Notre Dame; Clare – Penn State; Fullbacks: Flemming – Penn State, Notre Dame; Regan – Bradford; Kelly – Bradford; Palford – Lebanon Valley |
