= 1911 Holy Cross football team =

American college football season

1911 Holy Cross football
- Conference: Independent
- Record: 4–5
- Head coach: Timothy F. Larkin (5th season)
- Captain: William Joy
- Home stadium: Fitton Field

1911 Eastern college football independents records
	Conf.			Overall
Team	W	L	T	W		L		T
Penn State		–		8	–	0	–	1
Carlisle		–		11	–	1	–	0
Princeton		–		8	–	0	–	2
Trinity (CT)		–		6	–	0	–	2
Temple		–		6	–	1	–	0
Army		–		6	–	1	–	1
Swarthmore		–		6	–	1	–	1
Dartmouth		–		8	–	2	–	0
Lafayette		–		8	–	2	–	0
Yale		–		7	–	2	–	1
Harvard		–		6	–	2	–	1
Cornell		–		7	–	3	–	0
Rhode Island State		–		5	–	2	–	1
Brown		–		7	–	3	–	1
Bucknell		–		6	–	3	–	1
Penn		–		7	–	4	–	0
Pittsburgh		–		4	–	3	–	1
Washington & Jefferson		–		6	–	4	–	0
Syracuse		–		5	–	3	–	2
Dickinson		–		4	–	4	–	0
Lehigh		–		5	–	5	–	1
Rutgers		–		4	–	4	–	1
Dickinson		–		4	–	4	–	0
St. Bonaventure		–		2	–	2	–	0
Carnegie Tech		–		4	–	5	–	0
Holy Cross		–		4	–	5	–	0
Tufts		–		3	–	4	–	0
Vermont		–		3	–	5	–	0
NYU		–		1	–	3	–	3
Colgate		–		3	–	6	–	0
Franklin & Marshall		–		3	–	6	–	0
New Hampshire		–		1	–	5	–	1
Geneva		–		1	–	6	–	1
Villanova		–		0	–	5	–	1
Boston College		–		0	–	7	–	0

The 1911 Holy Cross football team was an American football team that represented the College of the Holy Cross in the 1911 college football season.

In its fifth year under head coach Timothy F. Larkin, the team compiled a 4–5 record. William Joy was the team captain.

Though both Holy Cross and Dartmouth record their 1911 meeting in Hanover as a 6–0 win for the home team, officials on the field ruled it a 1–0 forfeit, as the Holy Cross team left the stadium after three quarters of play, reportedly to catch a train. Dartmouth 6, Holy Cross 0, was the score at the time of the forfeit.

The season-ending home game against crosstown rival Worcester Polytechnic Institute was postponed a week because of flooding on Holy Cross' home field. When the game was finally played November 25, about 4,000 people attended.

Holy Cross played its home games at Fitton Field on the college campus in Worcester, Massachusetts.

== Schedule ==
Date	Opponent	Site	Result	Source
September 23	Boston College	Fitton Field; Worcester, MA (rivalry)	W 13–5	
September 30	at Yale	Yale Field; New Haven, CT	L 0–26	
October 7	at Harvard	Harvard Stadium; Boston, MA	L 0–8	
October 14	at Dartmouth	Alumni Oval; Hanover, NH	L 0–6^	
October 21	Massachusetts	Fitton Field; Worcester, MA	W 6–0	
October 28	at Princeton	Osborne Field; Princeton, NJ	L 0–20	
November 4	Springfield Training School	Fitton Field; Worcester, MA	L 0–12	
November 11	Colby	Fitton Field; Worcester, MA	W 24–0	
November 25°	Worcester Tech	Fitton Field; Worcester, MA	W 35–0	
^ also reported as a 0–1 forfeit loss ° Postponed from Nov. 18
