= 1911 NYU Violets football team =

American college football season

1911 NYU Violets football
- Conference: Independent
- Record: 1–3–3
- Head coach: Herman Olcott (5th season)
- Home stadium: Ohio Field

1911 Eastern college football independents records
| | Conf. | | | Overall |
| Team | W | L | T | W | | L | | T |
|---|---|---|---|---|---|---|---|---|
| Penn State | | – | | 8 | – | 0 | – | 1 |
| Carlisle | | – | | 11 | – | 1 | – | 0 |
| Princeton | | – | | 8 | – | 0 | – | 2 |
| Trinity (CT) | | – | | 6 | – | 0 | – | 2 |
| Temple | | – | | 6 | – | 1 | – | 0 |
| Army | | – | | 6 | – | 1 | – | 1 |
| Swarthmore | | – | | 6 | – | 1 | – | 1 |
| Dartmouth | | – | | 8 | – | 2 | – | 0 |
| Lafayette | | – | | 8 | – | 2 | – | 0 |
| Yale | | – | | 7 | – | 2 | – | 1 |
| Harvard | | – | | 6 | – | 2 | – | 1 |
| Cornell | | – | | 7 | – | 3 | – | 0 |
| Rhode Island State | | – | | 5 | – | 2 | – | 1 |
| Brown | | – | | 7 | – | 3 | – | 1 |
| Bucknell | | – | | 6 | – | 3 | – | 1 |
| Penn | | – | | 7 | – | 4 | – | 0 |
| Pittsburgh | | – | | 4 | – | 3 | – | 1 |
| Washington & Jefferson | | – | | 6 | – | 4 | – | 0 |
| Syracuse | | – | | 5 | – | 3 | – | 2 |
| Dickinson | | – | | 4 | – | 4 | – | 0 |
| Lehigh | | – | | 5 | – | 5 | – | 1 |
| Rutgers | | – | | 4 | – | 4 | – | 1 |
| Dickinson | | – | | 4 | – | 4 | – | 0 |
| St. Bonaventure | | – | | 2 | – | 2 | – | 0 |
| Carnegie Tech | | – | | 4 | – | 5 | – | 0 |
| Holy Cross | | – | | 4 | – | 5 | – | 0 |
| Tufts | | – | | 3 | – | 4 | – | 0 |
| Vermont | | – | | 3 | – | 5 | – | 0 |
| NYU | | – | | 1 | – | 3 | – | 3 |
| Colgate | | – | | 3 | – | 6 | – | 0 |
| Franklin & Marshall | | – | | 3 | – | 6 | – | 0 |
| New Hampshire | | – | | 1 | – | 5 | – | 1 |
| Geneva | | – | | 1 | – | 6 | – | 1 |
| Villanova | | – | | 0 | – | 5 | – | 1 |
| Boston College | | – | | 0 | – | 7 | – | 0 |

The 1911 NYU Violets football team was an American football team that represented New York University as an independent during the 1911 college football season. In their fifth year under head coach Herman Olcott, the team compiled a 1–3–3 record.

== Schedule ==
| Date | Opponent | Site | Result | Attendance | Source |
|---|---|---|---|---|---|
| October 7 | Muhlenberg | Ohio Field; Bronx, NY | W 5–0 | | |
| October 21 | Rhode Island State | Ohio Field; Bronx, NY | T 0–0 | | |
| October 28 | at Williams | Williamstown, MA | L 6–8 | | |
| November 4 | at Yale | Yale Field; New Haven, CT | L 3–28 | | |
| November 7 | Trinity (CT) | Ohio Field; Bronx, NY | T 0–0 | 5,000 | |
| November 11 | Rutgers | Ohio Field; Bronx, NY | T 0–0 | | |
| November 18 | Wesleyan | Ohio Field; Bronx, NY | L 2–6 | | |
