= 1911 Dickinson Red and White football team =

American college football season

1911 Dickinson Red and White football
- Conference: Independent
- Record: 4–4
- Head coach: Simon F. Pauxtis (1st season)
- Captain: Luther E. Bashore
- Home stadium: Biddle Field

1911 Eastern college football independents records
	Conf.			Overall
Team	W	L	T	W		L		T
Penn State		–		8	–	0	–	1
Carlisle		–		11	–	1	–	0
Princeton		–		8	–	0	–	2
Trinity (CT)		–		6	–	0	–	2
Temple		–		6	–	1	–	0
Army		–		6	–	1	–	1
Swarthmore		–		6	–	1	–	1
Dartmouth		–		8	–	2	–	0
Lafayette		–		8	–	2	–	0
Yale		–		7	–	2	–	1
Harvard		–		6	–	2	–	1
Cornell		–		7	–	3	–	0
Rhode Island State		–		5	–	2	–	1
Brown		–		7	–	3	–	1
Bucknell		–		6	–	3	–	1
Penn		–		7	–	4	–	0
Pittsburgh		–		4	–	3	–	1
Washington & Jefferson		–		6	–	4	–	0
Syracuse		–		5	–	3	–	2
Dickinson		–		4	–	4	–	0
Lehigh		–		5	–	5	–	1
Rutgers		–		4	–	4	–	1
Dickinson		–		4	–	4	–	0
St. Bonaventure		–		2	–	2	–	0
Carnegie Tech		–		4	–	5	–	0
Holy Cross		–		4	–	5	–	0
Tufts		–		3	–	4	–	0
Vermont		–		3	–	5	–	0
NYU		–		1	–	3	–	3
Colgate		–		3	–	6	–	0
Franklin & Marshall		–		3	–	6	–	0
New Hampshire		–		1	–	5	–	1
Geneva		–		1	–	6	–	1
Villanova		–		0	–	5	–	1
Boston College		–		0	–	7	–	0

The 1911 Dickinson Red and White football team was an American football team that represented Dickinson College in Carlisle, Pennsylvania. The team compiled a 4–4 record while competing as an independent during the 1911 college football season. Simon F. Pauxtis was the head coach, and Luther E. Bashore was the captain.

The season began with a 17–0 loss to crosstown rival Carlisle, led by Jim Thorpe and coached by Pop Warner. Dickinson and Carlisle also played midweek scrimmages throughout the season.

The team included fullback/halfback Francis "Mother" Dunn and quarterback Hyman Goldstein, both of whom were among the first three persons inducted into the Dickinson College Athletic Hall of Fame. At the end of the season, Dunn was elected captain of the 1912 team.

Two games were cancelled. A game against Haverford was cancelled due to a wet field. A game against Ursinus was cancelled due to disagreement about eligibility rules.

== Schedule ==
Date	Opponent	Site	Result	Attendance	Source
September 30	at Carlisle	Indian Field; Carlisle, PA	L 0–17		
October 7	Western Maryland	Biddle Field; Carlisle, PA	W 29–5		
October 11	at Penn	Franklin Field; Philadelphia, PA	L 10–22		
November 4	Franklin & Marshall	Biddle Field; Carlisle, PA	W 6–0		
November 11	Gettysburg	Biddle Field; Carlisle, PA	W 11–0	3,000	
November 18	at Swarthmore	Swarthmore, PA	L 0–18		
November 25	Delaware	Newark, DE	W 11–0		
November 30	at Lafayette	March Field; Lafayette, PA	L 0–6		

== Players ==
- Luther E. Bashore - guard and captain
- J. Paul Brown - guard
- Francis "Mother" Dunn - halfback
- John L. Felton - lineman and ex-captain
- Hyman Goldstein - quarterback
- A.M. Goodling - substitute guard
- Joseph Z. Hertzler - center
- Jacobs - halfback
- Louis E. Lamborn - end, backfield
- Jacob B. Leidig - end
- Thomas W. MacGregor - tackle
- "Lou" Pearlman - line backer
- Howard S. Rogers - end
- Richard W. Salder - substitute center, backfield
- George Schaeffer - fullback
- Rippey Shearer - tackle
- Elbert W. Stafford - end
- Watkins - substitute guard
- P. Earl West - substitute guard
- Eugene Wilson - substitute quarterback
