= 1911 Geneva Covenanters football team =

American college football season

1911 Geneva Covenanters football
- Conference: Independent
- Record: 1–6–1
- Head coach: Arthur McKean (5th season)

1911 Eastern college football independents records
| | Conf. | | | Overall |
| Team | W | L | T | W | | L | | T |
|---|---|---|---|---|---|---|---|---|
| Penn State | | – | | 8 | – | 0 | – | 1 |
| Carlisle | | – | | 11 | – | 1 | – | 0 |
| Princeton | | – | | 8 | – | 0 | – | 2 |
| Trinity (CT) | | – | | 6 | – | 0 | – | 2 |
| Temple | | – | | 6 | – | 1 | – | 0 |
| Army | | – | | 6 | – | 1 | – | 1 |
| Swarthmore | | – | | 6 | – | 1 | – | 1 |
| Dartmouth | | – | | 8 | – | 2 | – | 0 |
| Lafayette | | – | | 8 | – | 2 | – | 0 |
| Yale | | – | | 7 | – | 2 | – | 1 |
| Harvard | | – | | 6 | – | 2 | – | 1 |
| Cornell | | – | | 7 | – | 3 | – | 0 |
| Rhode Island State | | – | | 5 | – | 2 | – | 1 |
| Brown | | – | | 7 | – | 3 | – | 1 |
| Bucknell | | – | | 6 | – | 3 | – | 1 |
| Penn | | – | | 7 | – | 4 | – | 0 |
| Pittsburgh | | – | | 4 | – | 3 | – | 1 |
| Washington & Jefferson | | – | | 6 | – | 4 | – | 0 |
| Syracuse | | – | | 5 | – | 3 | – | 2 |
| Dickinson | | – | | 4 | – | 4 | – | 0 |
| Lehigh | | – | | 5 | – | 5 | – | 1 |
| Rutgers | | – | | 4 | – | 4 | – | 1 |
| Dickinson | | – | | 4 | – | 4 | – | 0 |
| St. Bonaventure | | – | | 2 | – | 2 | – | 0 |
| Carnegie Tech | | – | | 4 | – | 5 | – | 0 |
| Holy Cross | | – | | 4 | – | 5 | – | 0 |
| Tufts | | – | | 3 | – | 4 | – | 0 |
| Vermont | | – | | 3 | – | 5 | – | 0 |
| NYU | | – | | 1 | – | 3 | – | 3 |
| Colgate | | – | | 3 | – | 6 | – | 0 |
| Franklin & Marshall | | – | | 3 | – | 6 | – | 0 |
| New Hampshire | | – | | 1 | – | 5 | – | 1 |
| Geneva | | – | | 1 | – | 6 | – | 1 |
| Villanova | | – | | 0 | – | 5 | – | 1 |
| Boston College | | – | | 0 | – | 7 | – | 0 |

The 1911 Geneva Covenanters football team was an American football team that represented Geneva College as an independent during the 1911 college football season. Led by Arthur McKean in his fifth and final year as head coach, the team compiled a record of 1–6–1.

== Schedule ==
| Date | Opponent | Site | Result | Attendance | Source |
|---|---|---|---|---|---|
| September 30 | at Penn State | New Beaver Field; State College, PA | L 0–57 | | |
| October 7 | Grove City | Beaver Falls, PA | L 0–15 | | |
| October 14 | at Carnegie Tech | Leeds Field; Pittsburgh, PA | L 0–5 | 2,000 | |
| October 21 | at Grove City | Grove City, PA | L 0–9 | | |
| October 28 | Allegheny | Beaver Falls, PA | L 0–11 | | |
| November 4 | Waynesburg | Waynesburg, PA | W 5–0 | | |
| November 11 | at Washington & Jefferson | Washington, PA | L 0–19 | | |
| November 18 | Bethany (WV) | Beaver Falls, PA | T 0–0 | | |
