= 1911 Lafayette football team =

American football club

1911 Lafayette football
- Conference: Independent
- Record: 8–2
- Head coach: Bob Folwell (3rd season; first 5 games); Samuel B. Newton (last 5 games)
- Captain: William Dannehower
- Home stadium: March Field

1911 Eastern college football independents records
	Conf.			Overall
Team	W	L	T	W		L		T
Penn State		–		8	–	0	–	1
Carlisle		–		11	–	1	–	0
Princeton		–		8	–	0	–	2
Trinity (CT)		–		6	–	0	–	2
Temple		–		6	–	1	–	0
Army		–		6	–	1	–	1
Swarthmore		–		6	–	1	–	1
Dartmouth		–		8	–	2	–	0
Lafayette		–		8	–	2	–	0
Yale		–		7	–	2	–	1
Harvard		–		6	–	2	–	1
Cornell		–		7	–	3	–	0
Rhode Island State		–		5	–	2	–	1
Brown		–		7	–	3	–	1
Bucknell		–		6	–	3	–	1
Penn		–		7	–	4	–	0
Pittsburgh		–		4	–	3	–	1
Washington & Jefferson		–		6	–	4	–	0
Syracuse		–		5	–	3	–	2
Dickinson		–		4	–	4	–	0
Lehigh		–		5	–	5	–	1
Rutgers		–		4	–	4	–	1
Dickinson		–		4	–	4	–	0
St. Bonaventure		–		2	–	2	–	0
Carnegie Tech		–		4	–	5	–	0
Holy Cross		–		4	–	5	–	0
Tufts		–		3	–	4	–	0
Vermont		–		3	–	5	–	0
NYU		–		1	–	3	–	3
Colgate		–		3	–	6	–	0
Franklin & Marshall		–		3	–	6	–	0
New Hampshire		–		1	–	5	–	1
Geneva		–		1	–	6	–	1
Villanova		–		0	–	5	–	1
Boston College		–		0	–	7	–	0

The 1911 Lafayette football team was an American football team that represented Lafayette College as an independent during the 1911 college football season. Under head coaches Bob Folwell (first five games) and Samuel B. Newton (final five games), the team compiled an 8–2 record. William Dannehower was the team captain. The team played its home games at March Field in Easton, Pennsylvania.

== Schedule ==
Date	Opponent	Site	Result	Attendance	Source
September 23	Bloomsburg Normal	March Field; Easton, PA	W 53–0		
September 30	Ursinus	March Field; Easton, PA	W 3–0		
October 7	Swarthmore	March Field; Easton, PA	W 12–5		
October 14	Gettysburg	March Field; Easton, PA	W 36–0		
October 21	at Syracuse	Archbold Stadium; Syracuse, NY	W 10–0	5,500	
October 28	Carlisle	March Field; Easton, PA	L 0–19		
November 4	Bucknell	March Field; Easton, PA	W 6–0		
November 11	at Penn	Franklin Field; Philadelphia, PA	L 6–23		
November 25	at Lehigh	South Bethlehem, PA (rivalry)	W 11–0		
November 30	Dickinson	March Field; Easton, PA	W 6–0		
