= 1911 Dartmouth football team =

American college football season

1911 Dartmouth football
- Conference: Independent
- Record: 8–2
- Head coach: Frank Cavanaugh (1st season)
- Captain: Edward J. Daley

1911 Eastern college football independents records
	Conf.			Overall
Team	W	L	T	W		L		T
Penn State		–		8	–	0	–	1
Carlisle		–		11	–	1	–	0
Princeton		–		8	–	0	–	2
Trinity (CT)		–		6	–	0	–	2
Temple		–		6	–	1	–	0
Army		–		6	–	1	–	1
Swarthmore		–		6	–	1	–	1
Dartmouth		–		8	–	2	–	0
Lafayette		–		8	–	2	–	0
Yale		–		7	–	2	–	1
Harvard		–		6	–	2	–	1
Cornell		–		7	–	3	–	0
Rhode Island State		–		5	–	2	–	1
Brown		–		7	–	3	–	1
Bucknell		–		6	–	3	–	1
Penn		–		7	–	4	–	0
Pittsburgh		–		4	–	3	–	1
Washington & Jefferson		–		6	–	4	–	0
Syracuse		–		5	–	3	–	2
Dickinson		–		4	–	4	–	0
Lehigh		–		5	–	5	–	1
Rutgers		–		4	–	4	–	1
Dickinson		–		4	–	4	–	0
St. Bonaventure		–		2	–	2	–	0
Carnegie Tech		–		4	–	5	–	0
Holy Cross		–		4	–	5	–	0
Tufts		–		3	–	4	–	0
Vermont		–		3	–	5	–	0
NYU		–		1	–	3	–	3
Colgate		–		3	–	6	–	0
Franklin & Marshall		–		3	–	6	–	0
New Hampshire		–		1	–	5	–	1
Geneva		–		1	–	6	–	1
Villanova		–		0	–	5	–	1
Boston College		–		0	–	7	–	0

The 1911 Dartmouth football team was an American football team that represented Dartmouth College as an independent during the 1911 college football season. In its first season under head coach Frank Cavanaugh, the team compiled an 8–2 record, shut out five of ten opponents, and outscored all opponents by a total of 137 to 19. Edward J. Daley was the team captain.

== Schedule ==
Date	Opponent	Site	Result	Source
September 27	Norwich	Hanover, NH	W 18–3	
September 30	Massachusetts	Hanover, NH	W 22–0	
October 4	Bowdoin	Hanover, NH	W 23–0	
October 7	Colby	Hanover, NH	W 12–0	
October 14	Holy Cross	Hanover, NH	W 6–0	
October 21	Williams	Hanover, NH	W 23–5	
October 28	Vermont	Hanover, NH	W 12–0	
November 4	at Amherst	Amherst, MA	W 18–3	
November 11	at Princeton	Osborne Field; Princeton, NJ	L 0–3	
November 18	at Harvard	Harvard Stadium; Boston, MA (rivalry)	L 3–5	
