= 1911 Swarthmore Quakers football team =

American college football season

1911 Swarthmore Quakers football
- Conference: Independent
- Record: 6–1–1
- Head coach: George H. Brooke (12th season)
- Home stadium: Whittier Field

1911 Eastern college football independents records
| | Conf. | | | Overall |
| Team | W | L | T | W | | L | | T |
|---|---|---|---|---|---|---|---|---|
| Penn State | | – | | 8 | – | 0 | – | 1 |
| Carlisle | | – | | 11 | – | 1 | – | 0 |
| Princeton | | – | | 8 | – | 0 | – | 2 |
| Trinity (CT) | | – | | 6 | – | 0 | – | 2 |
| Temple | | – | | 6 | – | 1 | – | 0 |
| Army | | – | | 6 | – | 1 | – | 1 |
| Swarthmore | | – | | 6 | – | 1 | – | 1 |
| Dartmouth | | – | | 8 | – | 2 | – | 0 |
| Lafayette | | – | | 8 | – | 2 | – | 0 |
| Yale | | – | | 7 | – | 2 | – | 1 |
| Harvard | | – | | 6 | – | 2 | – | 1 |
| Cornell | | – | | 7 | – | 3 | – | 0 |
| Rhode Island State | | – | | 5 | – | 2 | – | 1 |
| Brown | | – | | 7 | – | 3 | – | 1 |
| Bucknell | | – | | 6 | – | 3 | – | 1 |
| Penn | | – | | 7 | – | 4 | – | 0 |
| Pittsburgh | | – | | 4 | – | 3 | – | 1 |
| Washington & Jefferson | | – | | 6 | – | 4 | – | 0 |
| Syracuse | | – | | 5 | – | 3 | – | 2 |
| Dickinson | | – | | 4 | – | 4 | – | 0 |
| Lehigh | | – | | 5 | – | 5 | – | 1 |
| Rutgers | | – | | 4 | – | 4 | – | 1 |
| Dickinson | | – | | 4 | – | 4 | – | 0 |
| St. Bonaventure | | – | | 2 | – | 2 | – | 0 |
| Carnegie Tech | | – | | 4 | – | 5 | – | 0 |
| Holy Cross | | – | | 4 | – | 5 | – | 0 |
| Tufts | | – | | 3 | – | 4 | – | 0 |
| Vermont | | – | | 3 | – | 5 | – | 0 |
| NYU | | – | | 1 | – | 3 | – | 3 |
| Colgate | | – | | 3 | – | 6 | – | 0 |
| Franklin & Marshall | | – | | 3 | – | 6 | – | 0 |
| New Hampshire | | – | | 1 | – | 5 | – | 1 |
| Geneva | | – | | 1 | – | 6 | – | 1 |
| Villanova | | – | | 0 | – | 5 | – | 1 |
| Boston College | | – | | 0 | – | 7 | – | 0 |

The 1911 Swarthmore Quakers football team was an American football team that represented Swarthmore College as an independent during the 1911 college football season. The team compiled a 7–1–1 record and outscored opponents by a total of 84 to 23. George H. Brooke was the head coach.

== Schedule ==
| Date | Opponent | Site | Result | Source |
|---|---|---|---|---|
| September 30 | Delaware | Whittier Field; Swarthmore, PA | T 0–0 | |
| October 7 | at Lafayette | March Field; Easton, PA | L 5–11 | |
| October 14 | at Virginia | Madison Hall Field; Charlottesville, VA | W 9–8 | |
| October 21 | at Stevens | Hoboken, NJ | W 16–0 | |
| October 28 | Rutgers | Whittier Field; Swarthmore, PA | W 21–0 | |
| November 4 | Ursinus | Whittier Field; Swarthmore, PA | W 6–2 | |
| November 11 | at Lehigh | Lehigh Field; Bethlehem, PA | W 9–2 | |
| November 18 | Dickinson | Whittier Field; Swarthmore, PA | W 18–0 | |
