= 1911 Cornell Big Red football team =

American college football season

1911 Cornell Big Red football
- Conference: Independent
- Record: 7–3
- Head coach: Daniel A. Reed (2nd season)
- Captain: William Munk
- Home stadium: Percy Field

1911 Eastern college football independents records
	Conf.			Overall
Team	W	L	T	W		L		T
Penn State		–		8	–	0	–	1
Carlisle		–		11	–	1	–	0
Princeton		–		8	–	0	–	2
Trinity (CT)		–		6	–	0	–	2
Temple		–		6	–	1	–	0
Army		–		6	–	1	–	1
Swarthmore		–		6	–	1	–	1
Dartmouth		–		8	–	2	–	0
Lafayette		–		8	–	2	–	0
Yale		–		7	–	2	–	1
Harvard		–		6	–	2	–	1
Cornell		–		7	–	3	–	0
Rhode Island State		–		5	–	2	–	1
Brown		–		7	–	3	–	1
Bucknell		–		6	–	3	–	1
Penn		–		7	–	4	–	0
Pittsburgh		–		4	–	3	–	1
Washington & Jefferson		–		6	–	4	–	0
Syracuse		–		5	–	3	–	2
Dickinson		–		4	–	4	–	0
Lehigh		–		5	–	5	–	1
Rutgers		–		4	–	4	–	1
Dickinson		–		4	–	4	–	0
St. Bonaventure		–		2	–	2	–	0
Carnegie Tech		–		4	–	5	–	0
Holy Cross		–		4	–	5	–	0
Tufts		–		3	–	4	–	0
Vermont		–		3	–	5	–	0
NYU		–		1	–	3	–	3
Colgate		–		3	–	6	–	0
Franklin & Marshall		–		3	–	6	–	0
New Hampshire		–		1	–	5	–	1
Geneva		–		1	–	6	–	1
Villanova		–		0	–	5	–	1
Boston College		–		0	–	7	–	0

The 1911 Cornell Big Red football team was an American football team that represented Cornell University during the 1911 college football season. In their second season under head coach Daniel A. Reed, the Big Red compiled a 7–3 record and outscored all opponents by a combined total of 101 to 52. Tackle William Edward Munk was selected by Walter Camp as a second-team player, and by Baseball Magazine as a first-team player, on the 1911 College Football All-America Team.

== Schedule ==
Date	Opponent	Site	Result	Source
September 23	Allegheny	Percy Field; Ithaca, NY	W 35–0	
September 30	Colgate	Percy Field; Ithaca, NY (rivalry)	W 6–0	
October 7	Oberlin	Percy Field; Ithaca, NY	W 15–3	
October 14	Penn State	Percy Field; Ithaca, NY	L 0–5	
October 21	Washington & Jefferson	Percy Field; Ithaca, NY	W 6–0	
October 28	Pittsburgh	Percy Field; Ithaca, NY	W 9–3	
November 4	Williams	Percy Field; Ithaca, NY	W 15–14	
November 11	Michigan	Percy Field; Ithaca, NY	W 6–0	
November 18	at Chicago	Marshall Field; Chicago, IL	L 0–6	
November 30	at Penn	Franklin Field; Philadelphia, PA (rivalry)	L 9–21	
