= 1911 Penn State Nittany Lions football team =

American college football season

1911 Penn State Nittany Lions football
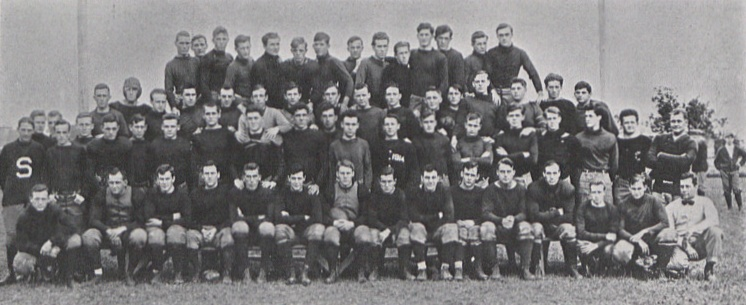

Co-national champion (NCF)
- Conference: Independent
- Record: 8–0–1
- Head coach: Bill Hollenback (2nd season)
- Captain: Dexter Very
- Home stadium: New Beaver Field

1911 Eastern college football independents records
	Conf.			Overall
Team	W	L	T	W		L		T
Penn State		–		8	–	0	–	1
Carlisle		–		11	–	1	–	0
Princeton		–		8	–	0	–	2
Trinity (CT)		–		6	–	0	–	2
Temple		–		6	–	1	–	0
Army		–		6	–	1	–	1
Swarthmore		–		6	–	1	–	1
Dartmouth		–		8	–	2	–	0
Lafayette		–		8	–	2	–	0
Yale		–		7	–	2	–	1
Harvard		–		6	–	2	–	1
Cornell		–		7	–	3	–	0
Rhode Island State		–		5	–	2	–	1
Brown		–		7	–	3	–	1
Bucknell		–		6	–	3	–	1
Penn		–		7	–	4	–	0
Pittsburgh		–		4	–	3	–	1
Washington & Jefferson		–		6	–	4	–	0
Syracuse		–		5	–	3	–	2
Dickinson		–		4	–	4	–	0
Lehigh		–		5	–	5	–	1
Rutgers		–		4	–	4	–	1
Dickinson		–		4	–	4	–	0
St. Bonaventure		–		2	–	2	–	0
Carnegie Tech		–		4	–	5	–	0
Holy Cross		–		4	–	5	–	0
Tufts		–		3	–	4	–	0
Vermont		–		3	–	5	–	0
NYU		–		1	–	3	–	3
Colgate		–		3	–	6	–	0
Franklin & Marshall		–		3	–	6	–	0
New Hampshire		–		1	–	5	–	1
Geneva		–		1	–	6	–	1
Villanova		–		0	–	5	–	1
Boston College		–		0	–	7	–	0

The 1911 Penn State Nittany Lions football team was an American football team that represented Pennsylvania State College as an independent during the 1911 college football season. In its second season under head coach Bill Hollenback, the team compiled an 8–0–1 record, shut out seven of nine opponents, and outscored all opponents by a total of 199 to 15.

There was no contemporaneous system in 1911 for determining a national champion. However, Penn State was retroactively named as the national champion by the National Championship Foundation.

Penn state end Dexter Very was selected by Walter Camp as a second-team player on the 1911 All-America college football team.

Five persons associated with the 1911 Penn State team were later inducted into the College Football Hall of Fame: coach Hollenback (inducted 1951); tackle Dick Harlow (inducted 1954 as a coach); fullback Pete Mauthe (inducted 1957); quarterback Shorty Miller (inducted 1974); and Very (inducted 1976).

== Schedule ==
Date	Opponent	Site	Result	Attendance	Source
September 30	Geneva	New Beaver Field; State College, PA	W 57–0		
October 7	Gettysburg	New Beaver Field; State College, PA	W 31–0		
October 14	at Cornell	Ithaca, NY	W 5–0		
October 21	Villanova	New Beaver Field; State College, PA	W 18–0		
October 28	at Penn	Franklin Field; Philadelphia, PA	W 22–6	15,000	
November 4	St. Bonaventure	New Beaver Field; State College, PA	W 46–0		
November 11	Colgate	New Beaver Field; State College, PA	W 17–9		
November 18	at Navy	Worden Field; Annapolis, MD	T 0–0		
November 30	at Pittsburgh	Forbes Field; Pittsburgh, PA (rivalry)	W 3–0	15,000–20,000	
