= 1911 Lehigh Brown and White football team =

American college football season

1911 Lehigh Brown and White football
- Conference: Independent
- Record: 5–5–1
- Head coach: Howard R. Reiter (2nd season)
- Home stadium: Lehigh Field

1911 Eastern college football independents records
	Conf.			Overall
Team	W	L	T	W		L		T
Penn State		–		8	–	0	–	1
Carlisle		–		11	–	1	–	0
Princeton		–		8	–	0	–	2
Trinity (CT)		–		6	–	0	–	2
Temple		–		6	–	1	–	0
Army		–		6	–	1	–	1
Swarthmore		–		6	–	1	–	1
Dartmouth		–		8	–	2	–	0
Lafayette		–		8	–	2	–	0
Yale		–		7	–	2	–	1
Harvard		–		6	–	2	–	1
Cornell		–		7	–	3	–	0
Rhode Island State		–		5	–	2	–	1
Brown		–		7	–	3	–	1
Bucknell		–		6	–	3	–	1
Penn		–		7	–	4	–	0
Pittsburgh		–		4	–	3	–	1
Washington & Jefferson		–		6	–	4	–	0
Syracuse		–		5	–	3	–	2
Dickinson		–		4	–	4	–	0
Lehigh		–		5	–	5	–	1
Rutgers		–		4	–	4	–	1
Dickinson		–		4	–	4	–	0
St. Bonaventure		–		2	–	2	–	0
Carnegie Tech		–		4	–	5	–	0
Holy Cross		–		4	–	5	–	0
Tufts		–		3	–	4	–	0
Vermont		–		3	–	5	–	0
NYU		–		1	–	3	–	3
Colgate		–		3	–	6	–	0
Franklin & Marshall		–		3	–	6	–	0
New Hampshire		–		1	–	5	–	1
Geneva		–		1	–	6	–	1
Villanova		–		0	–	5	–	1
Boston College		–		0	–	7	–	0

The 1911 Lehigh Brown and White football team was an American football team that represented Lehigh University as an independent during the 1911 college football season. In its second and final season under head coach Howard R. Reiter, the team compiled a 5–5–1 record and outscored opponents by a total of 91 to 82. Lehigh played home games at Lehigh Field in South Bethlehem, Pennsylvania.

== Schedule ==
Date	Opponent	Site	Result	Source
September 27	Lebanon Valley	Lehigh Field; South Bethlehem, PA	W 44–0	
September 30	Western Maryland	Lehigh Field; South Bethlehem, PA	W 11–5	
October 7	Bucknell	Lehigh Field; South Bethlehem, PA	L 0–3	
October 11	at Princeton	Osborne Field; Princeton, NJ	T 6–6	
October 21	Ursinus	Lehigh Field; South Bethlehem, PA	W 5–0	
October 28	at Army	The Plain; West Point, NY	L 0–20	
November 4	at Haverford	Haverford, PA	W 12–0	
November 11	Swarthmore	Lehigh Field; South Bethlehem, PA	L 2–9	
November 18	Franklin & Marshall	Lehigh Field; South Bethlehem, PA	W 8–0	
November 25	Lafayette	Lehigh Field; South Bethlehem, PA (rivalry)	L 0–11	
November 30	at Georgetown	Georgetown Field; Washington, DC	L 3–28	
