= 1911 Vermont Green and Gold football team =

American college football season

1911 Vermont Green and Gold football
- Conference: Independent
- Record: 3–5
- Head coach: Edward Joseph Slavin (2nd season)
- Home stadium: Centennial Field

1911 Eastern college football independents records
	Conf.			Overall
Team	W	L	T	W		L		T
Penn State		–		8	–	0	–	1
Carlisle		–		11	–	1	–	0
Princeton		–		8	–	0	–	2
Trinity (CT)		–		6	–	0	–	2
Temple		–		6	–	1	–	0
Army		–		6	–	1	–	1
Swarthmore		–		6	–	1	–	1
Dartmouth		–		8	–	2	–	0
Lafayette		–		8	–	2	–	0
Yale		–		7	–	2	–	1
Harvard		–		6	–	2	–	1
Cornell		–		7	–	3	–	0
Rhode Island State		–		5	–	2	–	1
Brown		–		7	–	3	–	1
Bucknell		–		6	–	3	–	1
Penn		–		7	–	4	–	0
Pittsburgh		–		4	–	3	–	1
Washington & Jefferson		–		6	–	4	–	0
Syracuse		–		5	–	3	–	2
Dickinson		–		4	–	4	–	0
Lehigh		–		5	–	5	–	1
Rutgers		–		4	–	4	–	1
Dickinson		–		4	–	4	–	0
St. Bonaventure		–		2	–	2	–	0
Carnegie Tech		–		4	–	5	–	0
Holy Cross		–		4	–	5	–	0
Tufts		–		3	–	4	–	0
Vermont		–		3	–	5	–	0
NYU		–		1	–	3	–	3
Colgate		–		3	–	6	–	0
Franklin & Marshall		–		3	–	6	–	0
New Hampshire		–		1	–	5	–	1
Geneva		–		1	–	6	–	1
Villanova		–		0	–	5	–	1
Boston College		–		0	–	7	–	0

The 1911 Vermont Green and Gold football team was an American football team that represented the University of Vermont as an independent during the 1911 college football season. In their second year under head coach Edward Joseph Slavin, the team compiled a 3–5 record.

== Schedule ==
Date	Opponent	Site	Result	Source
October 7	at Army	The Plain; West Point, NY	L 0–12	
October 11	Clarkson	Centennial Field; Burlington, VT	W 42–0	
October 15	St. Lawrence	Centennial Field; Burlington, VT	W 47–0	
October 21	at Maine	Alumni Field; Orono, ME	L 0–17	
October 28	at Dartmouth	Hanover, NH	L 0–12	
November 4	Norwich	Centennial Field; Burlington, VT	W 18–3	
November 11	at Syracuse	Archbold Stadium; Syracuse, NY	L 0–16	
November 18	at Brown	Andrews Field; Providence, RI	L 0–6	
