= 1911 Syracuse Orangemen football team =

American college football season

1911 Syracuse Orangemen football
- Conference: Independent
- Record: 5–3–2
- Head coach: C. DeForest Cummings (1st season)
- Captain: Preston Fogg
- Home stadium: Archbold Stadium

1911 Eastern college football independents records
	Conf.			Overall
Team	W	L	T	W		L		T
Penn State		–		8	–	0	–	1
Carlisle		–		11	–	1	–	0
Princeton		–		8	–	0	–	2
Trinity (CT)		–		6	–	0	–	2
Temple		–		6	–	1	–	0
Army		–		6	–	1	–	1
Swarthmore		–		6	–	1	–	1
Dartmouth		–		8	–	2	–	0
Lafayette		–		8	–	2	–	0
Yale		–		7	–	2	–	1
Harvard		–		6	–	2	–	1
Cornell		–		7	–	3	–	0
Rhode Island State		–		5	–	2	–	1
Brown		–		7	–	3	–	1
Bucknell		–		6	–	3	–	1
Penn		–		7	–	4	–	0
Pittsburgh		–		4	–	3	–	1
Washington & Jefferson		–		6	–	4	–	0
Syracuse		–		5	–	3	–	2
Dickinson		–		4	–	4	–	0
Lehigh		–		5	–	5	–	1
Rutgers		–		4	–	4	–	1
Dickinson		–		4	–	4	–	0
St. Bonaventure		–		2	–	2	–	0
Carnegie Tech		–		4	–	5	–	0
Holy Cross		–		4	–	5	–	0
Tufts		–		3	–	4	–	0
Vermont		–		3	–	5	–	0
NYU		–		1	–	3	–	3
Colgate		–		3	–	6	–	0
Franklin & Marshall		–		3	–	6	–	0
New Hampshire		–		1	–	5	–	1
Geneva		–		1	–	6	–	1
Villanova		–		0	–	5	–	1
Boston College		–		0	–	7	–	0

The 1911 Syracuse Orangemen football team represented Syracuse University as an independent during the 1911 college football season. Led by first-year head coach C. DeForest Cummings, the Orangemen compiled a record of 5–3–2. The team played home games at Archbold Stadium in Syracuse, New York.

== Schedule ==
Date	Time	Opponent	Site	Result	Attendance	Source
September 30		Hobart	Archbold Stadium; Syracuse, NY	W 6–0		
October 7		at Yale	Yale Field; New Haven, CT	L 0–12		
October 14	3:00 p.m.	at Rochester	Baseball Park; Rochester, NY	W 6–5		
October 21		Lafayette	Archbold Stadium; Syracuse, NY	L 0–10	5,500	
October 28		Springfield Training School	Archbold Stadium; Syracuse, NY	L 5–9	4,000	
November 4		at Michigan	Ferry Field; Ann Arbor, MI	T 6–6		
November 11		Vermont	Archbold Stadium; Syracuse, NY	W 16–0		
November 18		Carlisle	Archbold Stadium; Syracuse, NY	W 12–11		
November 25		at Ohio State	Ohio Field; Columbus, OH	W 6–0		
November 30	2:30 p.m.	at Saint Louis	University campus; St. Louis, MO	T 6–6	10,000	
