= 1911 Villanova Wildcats football team =

American college football season

1911 Villanova Wildcats football
- Conference: Independent
- Record: 0–5–1
- Head coach: Fred Crolius (8th season)

1911 Eastern college football independents records
	Conf.			Overall
Team	W	L	T	W		L		T
Penn State		–		8	–	0	–	1
Carlisle		–		11	–	1	–	0
Princeton		–		8	–	0	–	2
Trinity (CT)		–		6	–	0	–	2
Temple		–		6	–	1	–	0
Army		–		6	–	1	–	1
Swarthmore		–		6	–	1	–	1
Dartmouth		–		8	–	2	–	0
Lafayette		–		8	–	2	–	0
Yale		–		7	–	2	–	1
Harvard		–		6	–	2	–	1
Cornell		–		7	–	3	–	0
Rhode Island State		–		5	–	2	–	1
Brown		–		7	–	3	–	1
Bucknell		–		6	–	3	–	1
Penn		–		7	–	4	–	0
Pittsburgh		–		4	–	3	–	1
Washington & Jefferson		–		6	–	4	–	0
Syracuse		–		5	–	3	–	2
Dickinson		–		4	–	4	–	0
Lehigh		–		5	–	5	–	1
Rutgers		–		4	–	4	–	1
Dickinson		–		4	–	4	–	0
St. Bonaventure		–		2	–	2	–	0
Carnegie Tech		–		4	–	5	–	0
Holy Cross		–		4	–	5	–	0
Tufts		–		3	–	4	–	0
Vermont		–		3	–	5	–	0
NYU		–		1	–	3	–	3
Colgate		–		3	–	6	–	0
Franklin & Marshall		–		3	–	6	–	0
New Hampshire		–		1	–	5	–	1
Geneva		–		1	–	6	–	1
Villanova		–		0	–	5	–	1
Boston College		–		0	–	7	–	0

The 1911 Villanova Wildcats football team represented Villanova University in the 1911 college football season. Led by Fred Crolius in his eighth and final year as head coach, Villanova compiled a record of 0–5–1 record. The 1911 campaign was the second of two consecutive winless seasons for Villanova.

== Schedule ==
Date	Opponent	Site	Result	Source
October 7	at Princeton	Osborne Field; Princeton, NJ	L 0–31	
October 14	at Penn	Franklin Field; Philadelphia, PA	L 0–22	
October 21	at Penn State	New Beaver Field; State College, PA	L 0–18	
November 4	at Marquette	Milwaukee, WI	T 0–0	
November 11	at Pittsburgh	Forbes Field; Pittsburgh, PA	L 0–12	
November 25	at Washington & Jefferson	Washington, PA	L 6–11	
