= 1911 New Hampshire football team =

American college football season

1911 New Hampshire football
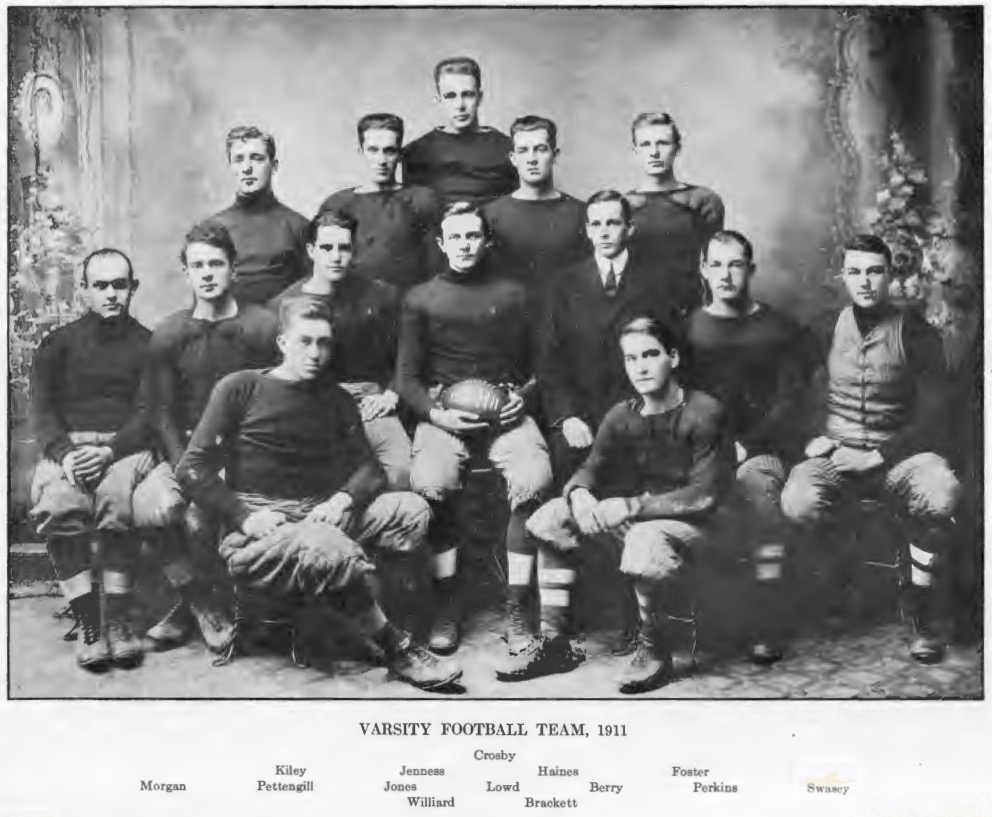
- Conference: Independent
- Record: 1–5–1
- Head coach: George McCaa (1st season; first 3 games); unclear (2 games); Ray B. Thomas (2nd season; final 2 games)
- Captain: Clarence M. Lowd
- Home stadium: College grounds, Durham, NH

1911 Eastern college football independents records
	Conf.			Overall
Team	W	L	T	W		L		T
Penn State		–		8	–	0	–	1
Carlisle		–		11	–	1	–	0
Princeton		–		8	–	0	–	2
Trinity (CT)		–		6	–	0	–	2
Temple		–		6	–	1	–	0
Army		–		6	–	1	–	1
Swarthmore		–		6	–	1	–	1
Dartmouth		–		8	–	2	–	0
Lafayette		–		8	–	2	–	0
Yale		–		7	–	2	–	1
Harvard		–		6	–	2	–	1
Cornell		–		7	–	3	–	0
Rhode Island State		–		5	–	2	–	1
Brown		–		7	–	3	–	1
Bucknell		–		6	–	3	–	1
Penn		–		7	–	4	–	0
Pittsburgh		–		4	–	3	–	1
Washington & Jefferson		–		6	–	4	–	0
Syracuse		–		5	–	3	–	2
Dickinson		–		4	–	4	–	0
Lehigh		–		5	–	5	–	1
Rutgers		–		4	–	4	–	1
Dickinson		–		4	–	4	–	0
St. Bonaventure		–		2	–	2	–	0
Carnegie Tech		–		4	–	5	–	0
Holy Cross		–		4	–	5	–	0
Tufts		–		3	–	4	–	0
Vermont		–		3	–	5	–	0
NYU		–		1	–	3	–	3
Colgate		–		3	–	6	–	0
Franklin & Marshall		–		3	–	6	–	0
New Hampshire		–		1	–	5	–	1
Geneva		–		1	–	6	–	1
Villanova		–		0	–	5	–	1
Boston College		–		0	–	7	–	0

The 1911 New Hampshire football team (Note: The school did not adopt the Wildcats nickname until February 1926; before then, they were generally referred to as "the blue and white".) was an American football team that represented New Hampshire College of Agriculture and the Mechanic Arts (Note: The school was often referred to as New Hampshire College or New Hampshire State College in newspapers of the era.) during the 1911 college football season—the school became the University of New Hampshire in 1923. The team finished with a record of 1–5–1.

The team began the season with new head coach George McCaa, but he resigned on October 9, after three games had been played, to become supervisor of athletics and assistant football coach at Lafayette College in Pennsylvania. Coaching of the team for the next two games is unclear—some contemporary sources named Joseph Courtney, apparently hired and quickly dismissed, (Note: The New Hampshire stated that Courtney was fired due to "dissatisfaction" with his work and for missing a practice game against crew members of the USS North Carolina.) but Courtney is believed to have been coach of the 1911 Boston College football team for the entire season. New Hampshire's athletic association hired Ray B. Thomas, who had coached the 1910 New Hampshire football team, to coach the final two games of the season. (Note: Thomas is the only coach listed for the 1911 season in New Hampshire's media guide, and in the recap of the 1911 season appearing in the school's 1913 yearbook.)

== Schedule ==
Scoring during this era awarded five points for a touchdown, one point for a conversion kick (extra point), and three points for a field goal. Teams played in the one-platoon system.

Date	Opponent	Site	Result	Attendance	Source
September 23	Bates	Durham, NH	T 6–6		
September 30	at Brown	Andrews Field; Providence, RI	L 0–56		
October 7	at Maine	Orono, ME (rivalry)	L 0–12		
October 14	at Springfield Training School	Springfield, MA	L 0–28		
October 21	Boston College	Durham, NH	W 12–0		
October 28	Rhode Island State	Durham, NH	L 8–9		
November 4	Massachusetts	Manchester, NH (rivalry)	L 0–8		

== Roster ==
Player	Position
Philip C. Jones	Left end
Augustine W. Jenness	Left end
Percy R. Crosby	Left guard
Irving C. Perkins	Center
Ralph C. Morgan	Right guard
James B. Pettengill	Right tackle
James E. Kiley	Right end
William H. L. Brackett	Quarterback
Clarence M. Lowd	Left halfback
Fred H. Swasey	Right halfback
Ray E. Haines	Fullback
Daniel P. A. Willard	Left guard
Perley A. Foster	Halfback

Each of the above players was awarded a varsity letter. Howard W. Sanborn, Byron H. Clark, Myles S. Watson, Timothy P. Reardon, Frank S. Davison, and Thomas J. Twomey were also listed as earning varsity letters.

Manager: George W. Berry, class of 1912

Asst. Managers: Perry E. Tubman and Gilbert F. Lane, class of 1913
