= 1911 Colgate football team =

American college football season

1911 Colgate football
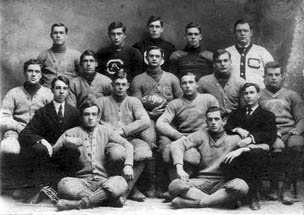
- Conference: Independent
- Record: 3–6
- Head coach: Jack E. Ingersoll (1st season)
- Captain: Clarence H. Thurber
- Home stadium: Whitnall Field

1911 Eastern college football independents records
	Conf.			Overall
Team	W	L	T	W		L		T
Penn State		–		8	–	0	–	1
Carlisle		–		11	–	1	–	0
Princeton		–		8	–	0	–	2
Trinity (CT)		–		6	–	0	–	2
Temple		–		6	–	1	–	0
Army		–		6	–	1	–	1
Swarthmore		–		6	–	1	–	1
Dartmouth		–		8	–	2	–	0
Lafayette		–		8	–	2	–	0
Yale		–		7	–	2	–	1
Harvard		–		6	–	2	–	1
Cornell		–		7	–	3	–	0
Rhode Island State		–		5	–	2	–	1
Brown		–		7	–	3	–	1
Bucknell		–		6	–	3	–	1
Penn		–		7	–	4	–	0
Pittsburgh		–		4	–	3	–	1
Washington & Jefferson		–		6	–	4	–	0
Syracuse		–		5	–	3	–	2
Dickinson		–		4	–	4	–	0
Lehigh		–		5	–	5	–	1
Rutgers		–		4	–	4	–	1
Dickinson		–		4	–	4	–	0
St. Bonaventure		–		2	–	2	–	0
Carnegie Tech		–		4	–	5	–	0
Holy Cross		–		4	–	5	–	0
Tufts		–		3	–	4	–	0
Vermont		–		3	–	5	–	0
NYU		–		1	–	3	–	3
Colgate		–		3	–	6	–	0
Franklin & Marshall		–		3	–	6	–	0
New Hampshire		–		1	–	5	–	1
Geneva		–		1	–	6	–	1
Villanova		–		0	–	5	–	1
Boston College		–		0	–	7	–	0

The 1911 Colgate football team was an American football team that represented Colgate University as an independent during the 1911 college football season. In its first and only season under head coach Jack E. Ingersoll, the team compiled a 3–6 record. Clarence H. Thurber was the team captain. The team played its home games on Whitnall Field in Hamilton, New York.

== Schedule ==
Date	Opponent	Site	Result	Source
September 30	at Cornell	Percy Field; Ithaca, NY (rivalry)	L 0–6	
October 7	Hobart	Whitnall Field; Hamilton, NY	W 29–0	
October 14	at Princeton	Osborne Field; Princeton, NJ	L 0–31	
October 21	vs. Trinity (CT)	Citizens Park; Oneida, NY	L 0–9	
October 28	at Yale	Yale Field; New Haven, CT	L 0–23	
November 4	Wesleyan	Whitnall Field; Hamilton, NY	W 6–0	
November 11	at Penn State	New Beaver Field; State College, PA	L 9–17	
November 18	at Army	The Plain; West Point, NY	L 6–12	
November 25	at Rochester	Rochester, NY	W 11–5	
