= 1911 Harvard Crimson football team =

American college football season

1911 Harvard Crimson football
- Conference: Independent
- Record: 6–2–1
- Head coach: Percy Haughton (4th season)
- Captain: Bob Fisher
- Home stadium: Harvard Stadium

1911 Eastern college football independents records
	Conf.			Overall
Team	W	L	T	W		L		T
Penn State		–		8	–	0	–	1
Carlisle		–		11	–	1	–	0
Princeton		–		8	–	0	–	2
Trinity (CT)		–		6	–	0	–	2
Temple		–		6	–	1	–	0
Army		–		6	–	1	–	1
Swarthmore		–		6	–	1	–	1
Dartmouth		–		8	–	2	–	0
Lafayette		–		8	–	2	–	0
Yale		–		7	–	2	–	1
Harvard		–		6	–	2	–	1
Cornell		–		7	–	3	–	0
Rhode Island State		–		5	–	2	–	1
Brown		–		7	–	3	–	1
Bucknell		–		6	–	3	–	1
Penn		–		7	–	4	–	0
Pittsburgh		–		4	–	3	–	1
Washington & Jefferson		–		6	–	4	–	0
Syracuse		–		5	–	3	–	2
Dickinson		–		4	–	4	–	0
Lehigh		–		5	–	5	–	1
Rutgers		–		4	–	4	–	1
Dickinson		–		4	–	4	–	0
St. Bonaventure		–		2	–	2	–	0
Carnegie Tech		–		4	–	5	–	0
Holy Cross		–		4	–	5	–	0
Tufts		–		3	–	4	–	0
Vermont		–		3	–	5	–	0
NYU		–		1	–	3	–	3
Colgate		–		3	–	6	–	0
Franklin & Marshall		–		3	–	6	–	0
New Hampshire		–		1	–	5	–	1
Geneva		–		1	–	6	–	1
Villanova		–		0	–	5	–	1
Boston College		–		0	–	7	–	0

The 1911 Harvard Crimson football team represented Harvard University in the 1911 college football season. The Crimson finished with a 6–2–1 record under fourth-year head coach Percy Haughton. Walter Camp selected two Harvard players, guard Bob Fisher and halfback Percy Wendell, as first-team members of his 1911 College Football All-America Team.

== Schedule ==
Date	Opponent	Site	Result	Source
September 30	Bates	Harvard Stadium; Boston, MA	W 15–0	
October 7	Holy Cross	Harvard Stadium; Boston, MA	W 8–0	
October 14	Williams	Harvard Stadium; Boston, MA	W 18–0	
October 21	Amherst	Harvard Stadium; Boston, MA	W 11–0	
October 28	Brown	Harvard Stadium; Boston, MA	W 20–6	
November 4	at Princeton	Osborne Field; Princeton, NJ (rivalry)	L 6–8	
November 11	Carlisle	Harvard Stadium; Boston, MA	L 15–18	
November 18	Dartmouth	Harvard Stadium; Boston, MA (rivalry)	W 5–3	
November 25	Yale	Harvard Stadium; Boston, MA (rivalry)	T 0–0	
