= 1911 Rhode Island State football team =

American college football season

1911 Rhode Island State football
- Conference: Independent
- Record: 5–2–1
- Head coach: George Cobb (3rd season)

1911 Eastern college football independents records
	Conf.			Overall
Team	W	L	T	W		L		T
Penn State		–		8	–	0	–	1
Carlisle		–		11	–	1	–	0
Princeton		–		8	–	0	–	2
Trinity (CT)		–		6	–	0	–	2
Temple		–		6	–	1	–	0
Army		–		6	–	1	–	1
Swarthmore		–		6	–	1	–	1
Dartmouth		–		8	–	2	–	0
Lafayette		–		8	–	2	–	0
Yale		–		7	–	2	–	1
Harvard		–		6	–	2	–	1
Cornell		–		7	–	3	–	0
Rhode Island State		–		5	–	2	–	1
Brown		–		7	–	3	–	1
Bucknell		–		6	–	3	–	1
Penn		–		7	–	4	–	0
Pittsburgh		–		4	–	3	–	1
Washington & Jefferson		–		6	–	4	–	0
Syracuse		–		5	–	3	–	2
Dickinson		–		4	–	4	–	0
Lehigh		–		5	–	5	–	1
Rutgers		–		4	–	4	–	1
Dickinson		–		4	–	4	–	0
St. Bonaventure		–		2	–	2	–	0
Carnegie Tech		–		4	–	5	–	0
Holy Cross		–		4	–	5	–	0
Tufts		–		3	–	4	–	0
Vermont		–		3	–	5	–	0
NYU		–		1	–	3	–	3
Colgate		–		3	–	6	–	0
Franklin & Marshall		–		3	–	6	–	0
New Hampshire		–		1	–	5	–	1
Geneva		–		1	–	6	–	1
Villanova		–		0	–	5	–	1
Boston College		–		0	–	7	–	0

The 1911 Rhode Island State football team was an American football team that represented Rhode Island State College (later renamed the University of Rhode Island) as an independent during the 1911 college football season. In its third year under head coach George Cobb, the team compiled a 5–2–1 record.

== Schedule ==
Date	Opponent	Site	Result	Source
September 23	at Massachusetts	Alumni Field; Amherst, MA	W 5–0	
September 30	at Maine	Alumni Field; Orono, ME	W 3–0	
October 4	at Brown	Andrews Field; Providence, RI (rivalry)	L 0–12	
October 14	Norwich	Kingston, RI	W 3–0	
October 21	at NYU	Ohio Field; Bronx, NY	T 0–0	
October 28	at New Hampshire	Durham, NH	W 9–8	
November 4	at Worcester Tech	Worcester, MA	L 0–3	
November 11	Boston College	Kingston, RI	W 25–0	
