= 1911 Brown Bears football team =

American college football season

1911 Brown Bears football
- Conference: Independent
- Record: 7–3–1
- Head coach: Edward N. Robinson (10th season)
- Home stadium: Andrews Field

1911 Eastern college football independents records
	Conf.			Overall
Team	W	L	T	W		L		T
Penn State		–		8	–	0	–	1
Carlisle		–		11	–	1	–	0
Princeton		–		8	–	0	–	2
Trinity (CT)		–		6	–	0	–	2
Temple		–		6	–	1	–	0
Army		–		6	–	1	–	1
Swarthmore		–		6	–	1	–	1
Dartmouth		–		8	–	2	–	0
Lafayette		–		8	–	2	–	0
Yale		–		7	–	2	–	1
Harvard		–		6	–	2	–	1
Cornell		–		7	–	3	–	0
Rhode Island State		–		5	–	2	–	1
Brown		–		7	–	3	–	1
Bucknell		–		6	–	3	–	1
Penn		–		7	–	4	–	0
Pittsburgh		–		4	–	3	–	1
Washington & Jefferson		–		6	–	4	–	0
Syracuse		–		5	–	3	–	2
Dickinson		–		4	–	4	–	0
Lehigh		–		5	–	5	–	1
Rutgers		–		4	–	4	–	1
Dickinson		–		4	–	4	–	0
St. Bonaventure		–		2	–	2	–	0
Carnegie Tech		–		4	–	5	–	0
Holy Cross		–		4	–	5	–	0
Tufts		–		3	–	4	–	0
Vermont		–		3	–	5	–	0
NYU		–		1	–	3	–	3
Colgate		–		3	–	6	–	0
Franklin & Marshall		–		3	–	6	–	0
New Hampshire		–		1	–	5	–	1
Geneva		–		1	–	6	–	1
Villanova		–		0	–	5	–	1
Boston College		–		0	–	7	–	0

The 1911 Brown Bears football team represented Brown University as an independent during the 1911 college football season. Led by tenth-year head coach Edward N. Robinson, Brown compiled a record of 7–3–1.

== Schedule ==
Date	Opponent	Site	Result	Source
September 23	New Hampshire	Andrews Field; Providence, RI	W 56–0	
September 30	Rhode Island State	Andrews Field; Providence, RI (rivalry)	W 12–0	
October 7	Massachusetts	Andrews Field; Providence, RI	W 26–0	
October 14	Bowdoin	Andrews Field; Providence, RI	W 33–0	
October 21	at Penn	Franklin Field; Philadelphia, PA	W 6–0	
October 28	at Harvard	Harvard Stadium; Boston, MA	L 6–20	
November 4	Tufts	Andrews Field; Providence, RI	W 30–0	
November 11	at Yale	Yale Field; New Haven, CT	L 0–15	
November 18	Vermont	Andrews Field; Providence, RI	W 6–0	
November 25	Trinity (CT)	Andrews Field; Providence, RI	T 6–6	
November 30	Carlisle	Andrews Field; Providence, RI	L 6–12	
