= 1911 Pittsburgh Panthers football team =

American college football season

1911 Pittsburgh Panthers football
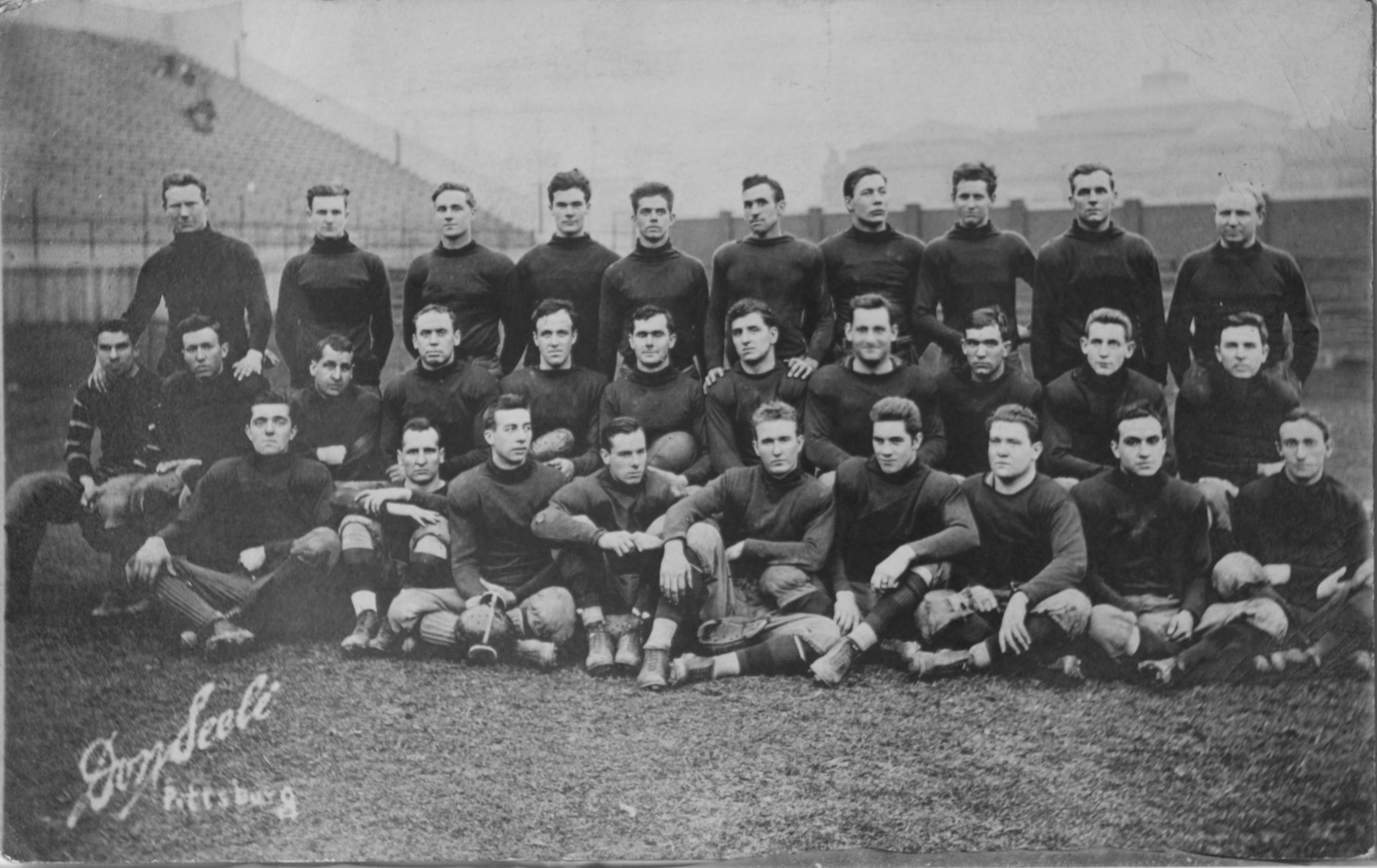
- Conference: Independent
- Record: 4–3–1
- Head coach: Joseph H. Thompson (3rd season)
- Captain: Jack Lindsay
- Home stadium: Forbes Field

1911 Eastern college football independents records
	Conf.			Overall
Team	W	L	T	W		L		T
Penn State		–		8	–	0	–	1
Carlisle		–		11	–	1	–	0
Princeton		–		8	–	0	–	2
Trinity (CT)		–		6	–	0	–	2
Temple		–		6	–	1	–	0
Army		–		6	–	1	–	1
Swarthmore		–		6	–	1	–	1
Dartmouth		–		8	–	2	–	0
Lafayette		–		8	–	2	–	0
Yale		–		7	–	2	–	1
Harvard		–		6	–	2	–	1
Cornell		–		7	–	3	–	0
Rhode Island State		–		5	–	2	–	1
Brown		–		7	–	3	–	1
Bucknell		–		6	–	3	–	1
Penn		–		7	–	4	–	0
Pittsburgh		–		4	–	3	–	1
Washington & Jefferson		–		6	–	4	–	0
Syracuse		–		5	–	3	–	2
Dickinson		–		4	–	4	–	0
Lehigh		–		5	–	5	–	1
Rutgers		–		4	–	4	–	1
Dickinson		–		4	–	4	–	0
St. Bonaventure		–		2	–	2	–	0
Carnegie Tech		–		4	–	5	–	0
Holy Cross		–		4	–	5	–	0
Tufts		–		3	–	4	–	0
Vermont		–		3	–	5	–	0
NYU		–		1	–	3	–	3
Colgate		–		3	–	6	–	0
Franklin & Marshall		–		3	–	6	–	0
New Hampshire		–		1	–	5	–	1
Geneva		–		1	–	6	–	1
Villanova		–		0	–	5	–	1
Boston College		–		0	–	7	–	0

The 1911 Pittsburgh Panthers football team was an American football team that represented the University of Pittsburgh as an independent during the 1911 college football season. In its third season under head coach Joseph H. Thompson, the team compiled a 4–3–1 record and outscored opponents by a total of 72 to 29.

== Schedule ==
Date	Opponent	Site	Result	Attendance	Source
October 7	Westminster (PA)	Forbes Field; Pittsburgh, PA	W 23–0		
October 14	Ohio Northern	Forbes Field; Pittsburgh, PA	W 22–0		
October 21	Carlisle	Forbes Field; Pittsburgh, PA	L 0–17	8,000	
October 28	at Cornell	Percy Field; Ithaca, NY	L 3–9		
November 4	Notre Dame	Forbes Field; Pittsburgh, PA (rivalry)	T 0–0	10,000	
November 11	Villanova	Forbes Field; Pittsburgh, PA	W 12–0		
November 18	Washington & Jefferson	Forbes Field; Pittsburgh, PA	W 12–0	10,000	
November 30	Penn State	Forbes Field; Pittsburgh, PA (rivalry)	L 0–3	15,000–20,000	

== Preseason ==
At the 1910 season year end banquet, Jack Lindsay was elected captain for the 1911 season and Joseph Trees, former WUP football player and noted alumnus, donated two hundred thousand dollars for a gymnasium and athletic field. Coach Thompson immediately proposed the field be named Trees Stadium.

To prepare for the 1911 season Coach Thompson started fall practice on September 14. Two of his former players received coaching jobs – Homer Roe at Pittsburgh High School and Frank Van Doren at Waynesburg College.

The Pitt Weekly warned that "It has often been noticed that after a particularly successful season, such as Pitt had last year, a slump has followed either due to a loss of seasoned material or an acquired 'swell head.'"

Coach Thompson was assisted by Floyd Rose and Alexander Stevenson along with occasional help from former players. Jack Adams was hired as trainer. He had a good nucleus of returning veterans for the 1911 season: captain/end Jack Lindsay, quarterback Tillie Dewar, tackles Henry Blair and James Stevenson, halfbacks George Brown and Charles Quailey, center Ralph Galvin, guards George Gehlert and Ross Feightner and end Hube Wagner.

Graduate Manager Laurence Hurst arranged the "hardest schedule ever faced by a Pitt team." Pitt faced Carlisle, Cornell, Notre Dame Villanova, Washington & Jefferson and Penn State back-to-back after warming up with Westminster and Ohio Northern. Cornell was the only road game. Originally, Buchtel was supposed to play Pitt but, they opted out because Pitt was too strong a team for them to play. Mr. Hurst managed to fill the date with Ohio Northern. All home games were played on Forbes Field.

== Coaching staff ==
1911 Pittsburgh Panthers football staff
Coaching staff: Joseph H. Thompson – Head coach; Floyd Rose – Assistant backfield coach; Alexander Stevenson – Assistant line coach; Frank Van Doren - consultant; Karl Dallenbach - consultant; Tex Richards - consultant; Norman Budd - consultant	Support staff: Laurence Hurst – Graduate manager of athletics; Jack Adams – Trainer

== Roster ==
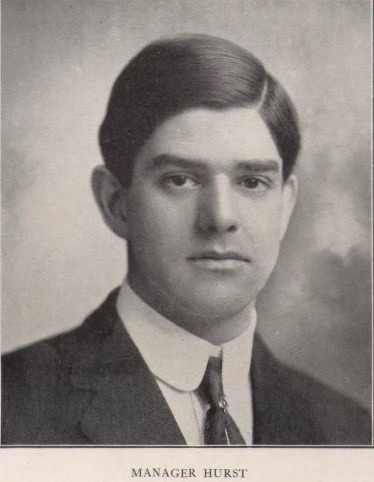

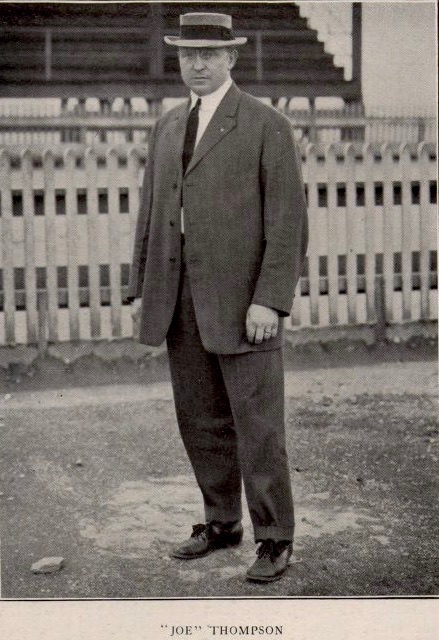

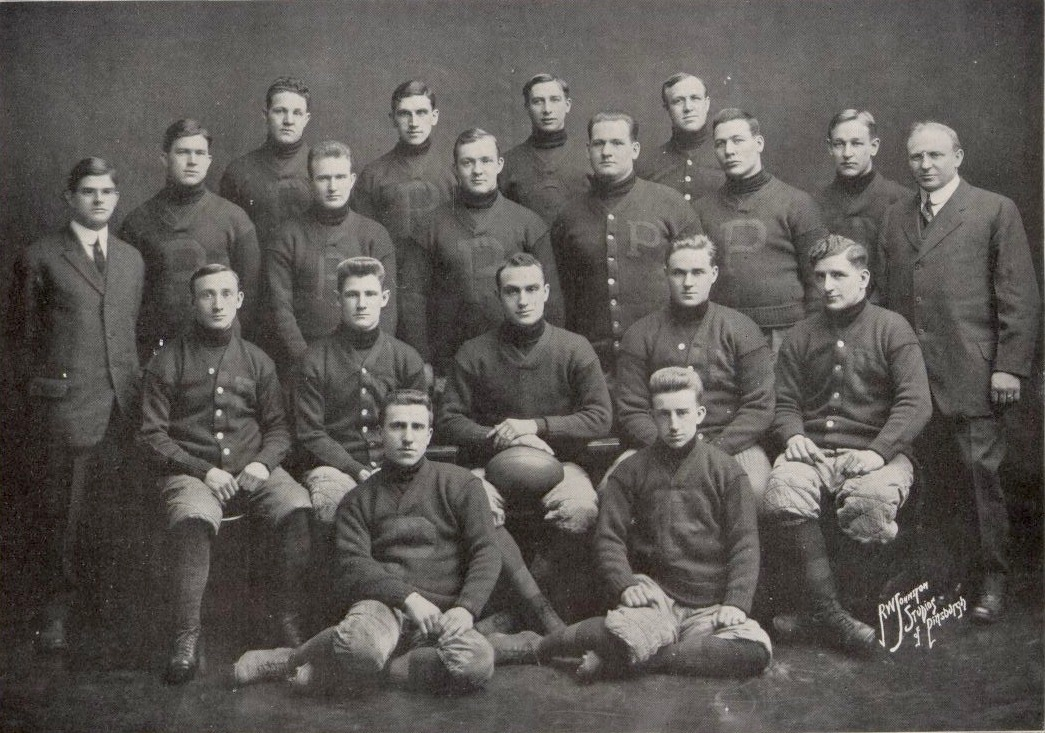
1911 Lettermen

1911 Pittsburgh Panthers football roster
Player	Position	Games	Height	Weight	Class	Prep School	Degree	Residence
John Lindsay^	end	6	5' 10"	160	1912	Johnstown H.S.	Doctor of Dental Surgery	Johnstown, PA
Hube Wagner^	end	8	5' 11"	185	1914	Monaca H.S.	Doctor of Medicine	Monaca, PA
Ralph Galvin^	center	8	6' 0"	235	1913	New Brighton H.S.	Doctor of Dental Surgery	New Brighton, PA
George Brown^	halfback	7	5' 10"	170	1913	New Brighton H.S.	Associate Economics	Haydenville, OH
S. V. Dillon^	halfback	6	5' 11"	150	1913	Kane H. S.		
Ross Feightner^	tackle	7	5' 11"	188	1912	Greensburg H.S.	Doctor of Dental Surgery	Greensburg, PA
Henry Blair^	guard	6	6'	190	1913	Allegheny H.S.	Dental School	
Wayne Smith^	guard	8	5' 9"	200	1915	Bellefonte Academy	Doctor of Dental Surgery	Pittsburgh, PA
William Connelly^	quarterback	8	5' 5"	140	1913	New Haven H.S.	Bachelor of Arts 1913/Associate Law 1916	New Haven, CT
Roy Kernohan^	halfback	5	5' 11"	168	1915	Homestead H.S.	Doctor of Dental Surgery	Homestead, PA
Herbert Dewar^	quarterback	8	5' 7"	147	1912	California Normal	Doctor of Dental Surgery	Elizabeth, PA
Charles Soles^	fullback	6	6'	184	1915	Mercersburg Academy	Associate Economics	McKeesport, PA
James Stevenson^	tackle	8	5' 11"	195	1912	Chester H.S.	Doctor of Medicine	McKeesport, PA
Charles Quailey^	halfback	8	5' 10"	163	1912	Dennison H.S.	Doctor of Dental Surgery	Pittsburgh, PA
Perry Graves^	end	8	5' 7"	150	1915	Rockford (Ill.) H.S.	School of Economics	Rockford, IL
George Gehlert^	guard	7	5' 11"	205	1913	Villa Nova Prep	Doctor of Dental Surgery	Hannah, ND
William Leahy^	guard	6	5' 10"	210	1914	Allegheny H.S.	enrolled in Dental School	
Enoch Pratt	guard	1	6' 4"	215	1914	Pittsburgh H.S.	Associate Engineering	Pittsburgh, PA
William McEllroy	end	0	5' 10"	135	1914	Edgewood H.S.	Bachelor of Science	Edgewood Park, PA
Walter Campbell	end	1	5' 7"	150	1912	Homestead H.S.	Bachelor of Arts	Homestead, PA
Harry Davis	end	0	5' 7"	152	1913	Pittsburgh H.S.	Bachelor of Science in Econ.	Pittsburgh, PA
John Cummins	guard	4	5' 8"	160	1914	California Normal	Bachelor of Science	Ben Avon, PA
Bowman Ashe	end	1	6' 9"	170	1912	Mt. Union College	Bachelor of Science in Economics 1912 and Associate Law in 1917	Knoxville, PA
Samuel Kipp	end	0	6' 0"	158	1913	Carnegie H.S.	Bachelor of Science in Civil Engineering	Bellevue, PA
James Hemphill	tackle	0	5' 8"	168	1914	Duquesne H.S.	Bachelor of Science in Mechanical Engineering	Duquesne, PA
William McKinney	end	0	5' 11"	146	1914	Trenton H.S.	Bachelor of Arts & Bachelor of Science 1914 and Masters of Arts 1916	Pittsburgh, PA
Hurleigh Bates	halfback	0	5' 10"	158	1914	Ohio Wesleyan Prep	Doctor of Dental Surgery	Magnetic Springs, OH
John Bane	end	0	5' 9"	135	1913	Homestead H.S.	Bachelor of Arts 1913 and Bachelor of Laws 1916	Munhall, Pa
Howard Leitch	end	0	5' 9"	130	1912	Pittsburgh H.S.	Bachelor of Arts 1912 and Bachelor of Laws 1915	Pittsburgh, PA
Francis Howard	guard	0	5' 9"	180	1913	Slippery Rock Normal	Doctor of Pharmacy	Youngwood, PA
John Madden	end	0	5' 10"	165	1913	Mt. Pleasant H.S.	Doctor of Dental Surgery	Mt. Pleasant, PA
R. M. Williams	guard	2	6'	210	1915	Tome Institute		
^ Lettermen

== Game summaries ==
=== Westminster ===
Week 1: Westminster at Pitt

Team	1	2	3	4	Total
Westminster	0	0	0	0	0
• Pitt	0	6	6	11	23

- Date: October 8, 1910
- Location: Forbes Field
  Pittsburgh, PA
- Referee: J. A. Miller Jr. (Swarthmore)

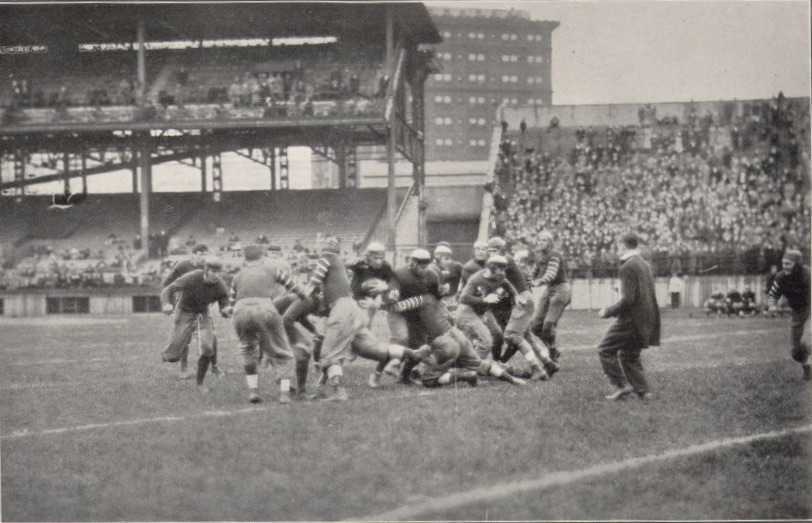
1911 Pitt versus Westminster football game action

The 1911 Pitt football season debuted on October 7 against Westminster College from New Wilmington, Pa. in front of the largest crowd to ever witness a Pitt home opener. The crowd size was aided by Graduate Manager Hurst distributing four thousand free tickets to the Pittsburgh Public School Boys' Athletic League and the receipts still covered the expenses of the game. Head Cheerleader George Kirk "had no trouble in getting plenty of volume and snap into the yells – everyone seemed full of ′pep′."

The Pitt team was healthy except for George Brown, who injured his shoulder in practice and would not play. Westminster Captain and fullback Mansell fractured his ankle in their opening game and was out for the season. Coach Thompson had three newcomers in the starting lineup: S.V. Dillon at halfback, Wayne Smith at guard, and Chuck Soles at end.

Eight minutes into the game Charles Quailey finished off an offensive drive with a ten yard scamper for the first score. Ralph Galvin kicked the point after and Pitt led 6 to 0.

The second quarter was scoreless with many exchanges of punts. The excitement of the period was when Pitt quarterback Tillie Dewar fielded a punt and was tackled roughly by Westminster tackle Weigel. Both players were accused of "mixing it up" and ejected. Connelly replaced Dewar at quarterback and the half ended a few plays later.

Hube Wagner returned the second half kick-off fifty yards "and brought the spectators to their feet cheering." Connelly raced thirty five yards around left end for a touchdown late in the quarter. Galvin was good on the point after. At the end of the third quarter the Pitt offense had the ball on the Westminster 6-yard line. After the break, Charles Quailey plunged into the end zone on third down for Pitt's third touchdown. Galvin missed the extra point. After an exchange of punts the Pitt offense completed a forward pass to the Westminster 37-yard line. On first down Quailey raced thirty yards to the seven. Two plays later Wagner scored the final touchdown of the game. Galvin was good on the point after and Pitt won 23 to 0.

Late in the game, the Pitt offense was advancing the ball. Hube Wagner ran around the end and was tackled out of bounds. He landed in front of the ejected Weigel, who decided to take a swing at him. The Pitt players were not happy. The Pittsburgh Gazette Times noted:

"For several minutes the players formed one mass of humanity, and all that could be seen was swinging arms and players falling. It looked like a small riot." Ralph Galvin was ejected and Westminster Coach Gildersleeve was arrested and taken to the police station. The game ended moments later.

The Pitt lineup for the game against Westminster was Charles Soles (left end), Henry Blair (left tackle), Ross Feightner and George Gehlert (left guard), Ralph Galvin and John Cummins (center), Wayne Smith and R. Williams (right guard), James Stevenson (right tackle), Jack Lindsay and Perry Graves (right end), Tillie Dewar and William Connelly (quarterback), Charles Quailey (left halfback), S.V. Dillon and Roy Kernohan (right halfback), and Hube Wagner (fullback). The game consisted of ten-minute quarters.

=== Ohio Northern ===
Week 2: Ohio Northern at Pitt

Team	1	2	3	4	Total
Ohio Northern	0	0	0	0	0
• Pitt	5	6	5	6	22

- Date: October 14, 1911
- Location: Forbes Field
  Pittsburgh, PA
- Referee: Ewing L. Rafferty (Princeton)

Graduate Manager Laurence Hurst was able to contract with Ohio Northern University to fill the October 14 date vacated by Buchtel. This was the fourth meeting between these schools and Pitt won all three previous games, outscoring the Titans 68–0.

According to The Gazette Times: "The Ohioans did not score a point, but they compelled Pitt to go the entire route."

Pitt's first score was aided by the visitor's tackle Kahlbaum slugging Pitt halfback S. V. Dillon. He was ejected and a half the distance to the goal penalty was assessed. Pitt promptly advanced the ball from the 22-yard line to the end zone. Hube Wagner plunged over from the two. Ralph Galvin missed the goal after.

In the middle of the second quarter, Tillie Dewar caught two passes from Hube Wagner. The first gained twenty-five yards and the second was an eighteen yard touchdown reception. Galvin converted the extra point and Pitt led 11 to 0 at halftime.

The newly formed 26 member Pitt Student Band made their debut at this game. The Pitt Weekly stated: "It far exceeded all expectations. Besides playing all the Pitt songs, it rendered some very fine music between halves. At the end of the concert given by the bands during the intermission, the stands gave a great ovation to the band. Again and again the students gave ′three times three′ to the Pitt Student Band."

Early in the third quarter Hube Wagner completed a fifty yard touchdown pass to Tillie Dewar. Galvin missed the extra point. Coach Thompson made numerous substitutions. Wagner tried another pass play with the subs but he had to scramble. Forty yards later he crossed the goal line for the final touchdown of the day. Ralph Galvin converted the point after and the final score read 22 to 0.

The Pitt lineup for the game against Ohio Northern was Charles Soles and Perry Graves (left end), Ross Feightner (left tackle), George Gehlert and John Cummins (left guard), Ralph Galvin (center), Wayne Smith and R. Williams (right guard), James Stevenson (right tackle), Jack Lindsay and Walter Campbell (right end), Tillie Dewar and William Connelly (quarterback), George Brown and Charles Quailey (left halfback), S.V. Dillon and Roy Kernohan (right halfback), and Hube Wagner (fullback). The game consisted of ten-minute quarters.

=== Carlisle ===
Week 3: Carlisle at Pitt

Team	1	2	3	4	Total
• Carlisle	0	6	5	6	17
Pitt	0	0	0	0	0

- Date: October 21, 1911
- Location: Forbes Field
  Pittsburgh, PA
- Game attendance: 8,000
- Referee: Wilmer G. Crowell (Swarthmore)

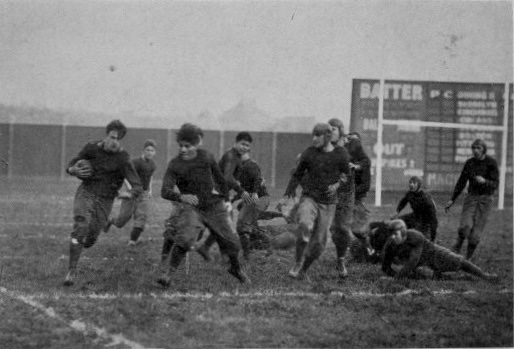
Pitt fullback Hube Wagner going around the end against Carlisle in 1911 game

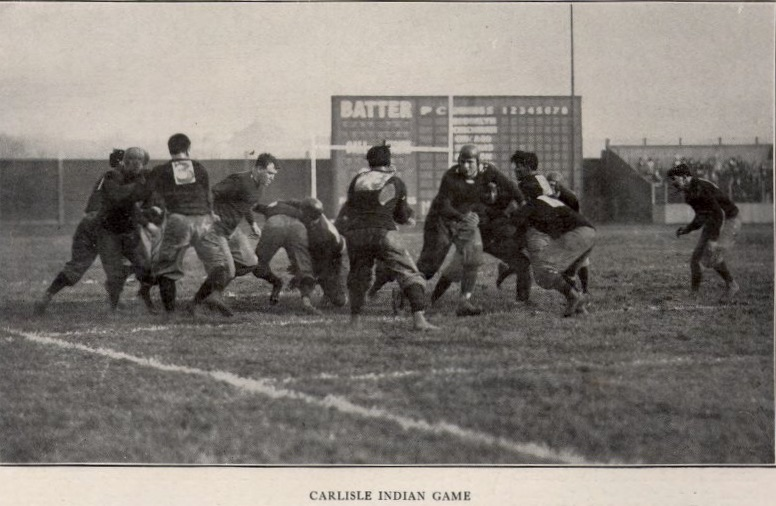
1911 Pitt versus Carlisle football game action

The undefeated Carlisle Indians coached by Glen Scobey Warner returned to Pittsburgh on October 21 to seek revenge for the 14 to 3 defeat they suffered in the 1909 season. Pitt had not given up a point in eleven straight games and outscored the opposition 327–0. Twelve thousand fans spent the afternoon at Forbes Field watching the action. The Pitt band and Cheerleaders George Kirk and his assistant Dick Johnson led the students, who were stationed in their newly constructed bleachers along the right field line, in their cheers throughout the game. Both teams wore numbers on their jerseys so the fans could spot their favorite players.

The Gazette Times wrote: "The Carlisle Indians defeated the University of Pittsburgh in a spectacular football game yesterday...on the Forbes Field gridiron 17–0. They had one of the greatest individual performers in Thorpe that has appeared on a Pittsburgh football field in years." The Pittsburg Press noted: "It was a case of a superior team winning – a team which was coached to the minute in all the tricky plays of up-to-date football and composed of eleven of the speediest and cleverest gridiron men appearing in this city for many years."

The difference in the game was Jim Thorpe. After he missed a field goal in the first quarter, Carlisle regained possession early in the second. Thorpe executed a perfect onside kick that bounced away from Tillie Dewar into Hugh Wheelock's grasp on Pitt's five yard line. He scampered for the first touchdown against Pitt in twelve games. Thorpe was good on the point after. On Carlisle's next possession Thorpe raced fifty yards to the Pitt thirty-five yard line but the Pitt defense stiffened and the half came to a close with the score 6 to 0 in favor of Carlisle.

Near the end of the third quarter, "Thorpe grabbed his own onside kick for a fifty yard gain and a touchdown." Thorpe missed the point after and Carlisle led 11–0. The Pitt offense then advanced the ball to the Carlisle 8-yard line but lost the ball on downs. After an exchange of punts Ralph Galvin was caught slugging Walsh and ejected. The penalty moved the ball to the Pitt 27-ard line. Carlisle fullback Stancil "Possum" Powell plunged for the last touchdown and Thorpe kicked the goal after to make the final read 17 to 0. Carlisle gained 426 yards on offense - all on the ground. Pitt had 156 total yards of offense.

Coach Thompson opined: "We were fairly beaten by a better team, and give the Indians due credit for their victory. It was certainly a wonderful aggregation that we faced, and mark my word, they will be heard from before the season ends."

Carlisle finished the season 11–1 and improved their record against Pitt to 3–1.

The Pitt lineup for the game against Carlisle was Chuck Soles and Perry Graves (left end), Henry Blair and William Leahy (left tackle), Ross Feightner (left guard), Ralph Galvin and John Cummins (center), Wayne Smith (right guard), James Stevenson, Henry Blair and George Gehlert (right tackle), Jack Lindsay (right end), Tillie Dewar and William Connolly (quarterback), Charles Quailey and S.V. Dillon (left halfback), George Brown (right halfback), and Hube Wagner (fullback). The game consisted of fifteen-minute quarters.

=== At Cornell ===
Week 4: Pitt at Cornell

Team	1	2	3	4	Total
Pitt	0	3	0	0	3
• Cornell	6	3	0	0	9

- Date: October 28, 1911
- Location: Percy Field
  Ithaca, NY
- Referee: Joseph B. Pendleton (Bowdoin)

On Thursday, October 26, the Pitt student band led two thousand students and alumni from Union Station to the P. & L. E. depot to give the football team a proper send-off to Ithaca, NY for their game with Cornell. The team arrived in Buffalo at 10 p.m. and spent the night in the Hotel Statler. Friday the entourage boarded the Lehigh Valley R.R. at 9 a.m. and arrived in Ithaca around noon. The team practiced at the Rogues Harbor Country Club in a sleet storm. Saturday the weather was perfect.

Four minutes into the first quarter, Cornell executed an onside kick that Tillie Dewar could not field and Cornell end Eyrich grabbed the ball and carried it thirty-five yards to the end zone. O'Connor was good on the extra point and Cornell led 6 to 0.

The Pitt Weekly noted:

"The same kind of play gave the Indians 12 points last Saturday at Forbes Field. Pitt's ill fortune this year might well be compared to the fabled, two faced Janus, who guarded the gates of Rome, but the smiling face seems ever turned toward the enemy while the frowning face looks always at the valiant Pitt eleven and her staunch supporters."

Early in the second quarter Ralph Galvin kicked a twenty-five yard field goal to cut the lead to 6 to 3. Cornell's offense promptly advanced the ball downfield to the Pitt 6-yard line. The Pitt defense stiffened, but Eyrich converted a twenty-eight yard field goal to extend the lead to 9–3.

There was no scoring in the second half. Cornell's offense had the ball on the Pitt 10-yard line but the Pitt defense stiffened and held. Cornell fullback Underhill was ejected for slugging Pitt quarterback Connolly. Punts, penalties, fumbles and defense dominated the remainder of the contest and Pitt lost for the second straight week.

Coach Thompson was not pleased with the officiating in his comments to The Pittsburg Press :

"I can see why W. & J. kicked about the officials after their game here. The work of several of the men here who had today's game in charge was anything but satisfactory."

This was Pitt's fourth game versus Cornell and their record was 0–4 having been outscored 80–8.

The Pitt lineup for the game with Cornell was Perry Graves and Hube Wagner (left end), William Leahy (left tackle), Henry Blair and George Gehlert (left guard), Ralph Galvin (center), Wayne Smith (right guard), James Stevenson (right tackle), Jack Lindsay and Chuck Soles (right end), Tillie Dewar and William Connelly (quarterback), George Brown (left halfback), Hube Wagner and Charles Quailey (right halfback), and Ross Feightner (fullback). The game consisted of fifteen-minute quarters.

=== Notre Dame ===
Week 5: Notre Dame at Pitt

Team	1	2	3	4	Total
Notre Dame	0	0	0	0	0
Pitt	0	0	0	0	0

- Date: November 4, 1911
- Location: Forbes Field
  Pittsburgh, PA
- Game attendance: 10,000
- Referee: F. A. Godcharles (Lafayette)

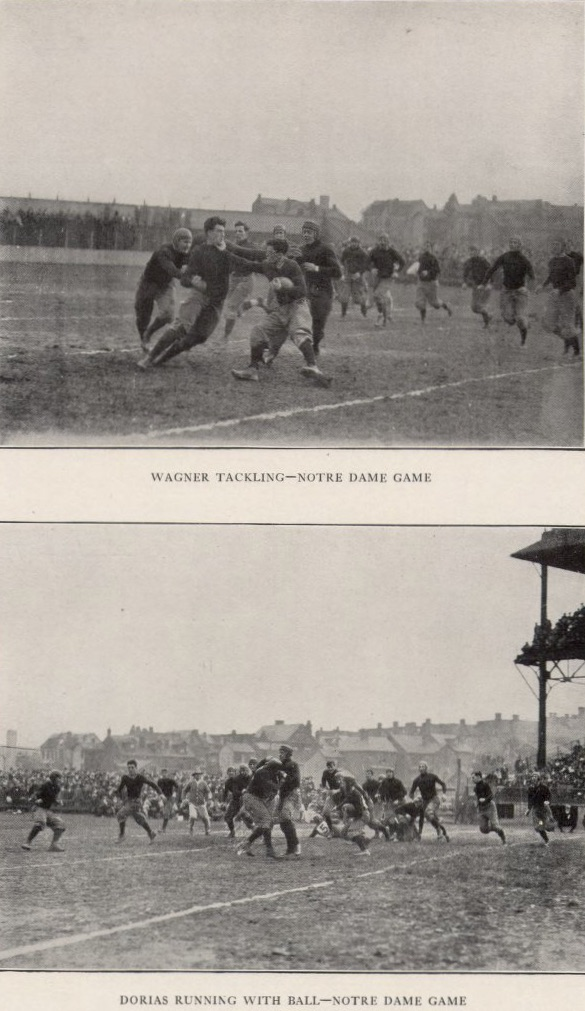
1911 Pitt vs. N. D. - Wagner on defense and Dorias gaining yards

On November 4, undefeated Notre Dame came east to pad their record against the Pitt eleven. Ten thousand fans were in attendance including Governor John K. Tener. The Irish were heavy favorites and "confident of a victory of not less than 18–0." The starting end on this team was Knute Rockne, who would go on to legendary fame as Notre Dame coach from 1918 to 1930.

Even though Captain Jack Lindsay and Henry Blair were unable to play, the Pitt team "looked something like the great aggregation which went through all last season without having a single point scored against it." The game ended in a 0 to 0 tie, although "Pitt had several good chances to score but were unable to pierce the Notre Dame defense at the crucial moment."

Ross Feightner blocked Notre Dame's first punt and Pitt recovered the ball on the thirteen yard line. Chuck Soles gained three yards on first down. George Brown fumbled on second down and Notre Dame recovered. The Pitt offense advanced the ball on their next possession to the twenty-five yard line and Ralph Galvin "moved back to the 33-yard mark and tried a field goal. He missed."

At the start of the second quarter Notre Dame fullback Eichenlaub quick kicked before the referee's whistle and end Knute Rockne scooped up the pigskin and raced to the end zone. The Irish fans were disappointed as the officials brought the ball back. Two possessions later Ross Feightner blocked another punt and then grabbed the ball and raced to the visitors twenty-yard line. The Irish defense held and Galvin missed a field goal. Notre Dame tried a double pass and fumbled. James Stevenson recovered on the thirteen yard line. A five yard pass and a six yard run placed the ball at the two. The Notre Dame defense stopped the next two plays and Pitt lost the ball on downs. Notre Dame punted to the 38-yard line and Galvin missed the field goal as time ran out in the first half of play.

At the start of the third quarter, Wayne Smith "again put Pitt within scoring distance by blocking a punt on the Notre Dame 27-yard line." On first down Pitt threw an interception. The remainder of the third quarter was a punting duel.

In the fourth quarter, George Brown, who "was unusually active on defense especially in breaking up forward passes," blocked a pass, grabbed the ball and raced to the end zone. The officials ruled the ball had touched the ground and was incomplete. The Notre Dame defense blocked a Pitt punt, gained possession and advanced the ball to the Pitt ten-yard line. The Pitt defense held and Gus Dorais missed the field goal try. The remainder of the game was a punting duel.

Notre Dame would finish the season undefeated with a 6–0–2 record under coach John L. Marks.

The Pitt lineup for the game against Notre Dame was Perry Graves (left end), Ross Feightner (left tackle), William Leahy (left guard), Ralph Galvin (center), Wayne Smith (right guard), James Stevenson (right tackle), Hube Wagner (right end), Tillie Dewar and William Connelly (quarterback), George Brown (left halfback), Charles Quailey (right halfback) and Chuck Soles and Roy Kernohan (fullback). The game consisted of fifteen-minute quarters.

=== Villanova ===
Week 6: Villa Nova at Pitt

Team	1	2	3	4	Total
Villa Nova	0	0	0	0	0
• Pitt	6	6	0	0	12

- Date: November 11, 1911
- Location: Forbes Field
  Pittsburgh, PA
- Game weather: rain
- Referee: F. A. Godcharles (Lafayette)

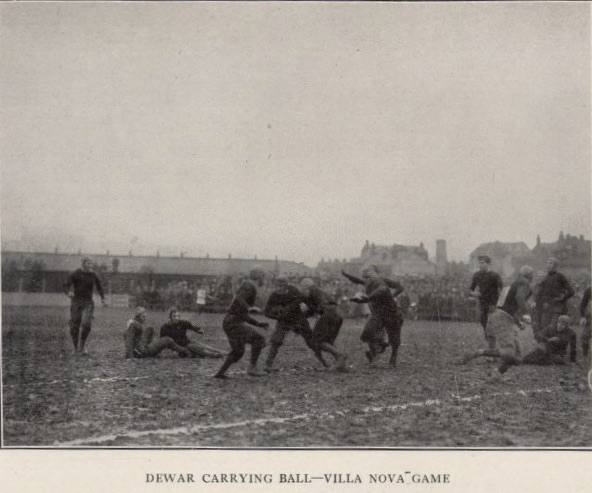
Pitt quarterback Tillie Dewar in 1911 game versus Villanova

On November 11 former WUP coach Fred Crolius brought his winless Villanova team west to take on the Pitt eleven.

The Daily Post described the scene:

"In what was probably the most spectacular mud-fest ever witnessed at Forbes Field, the University of Pittsburgh football team wallowed through four long, slimy periods yesterday afternoon to a decisive victory over Fred Crolius's Villa Nova eleven...The light rain that was falling when the game commenced became a downpour before the play had progressed very far, and in spite of the fact that the Pitt players changed uniforms between halves, there was not a man on the field that could have been recognized by any but his best friends after the first two or three scrimmages."

The game started out as a punting duel, until Villanova halfback Forst fumbled a punt and Pitt recovered on the Nova forty-five-yard line. Roy Kernohan was "sent through center for eleven yards." William Connelly, who got the start at quarterback, "plowed through the same opening" and bulled his way into the end zone dragging Wildcat quarterback Skelton with him. Connelly was injured on the play and replaced by Tillie Dewar. Ralph Galvin converted the point after and Pitt led 6 to 0. Dewar returned the kick off sixty yards to the Villanova forty-eight-yard line. The Pitt offense moved the ball but turned it over on an onside kick on the eight-yard line. Villanova punted and Ralph Galvin missed a thirty-eight yard field goal attempt to end the first quarter.

Early in the second quarter, Henry Blair blocked a Villanova punt and Perry Graves, "who was in the right spot, picked it up and ran the distance for a touchdown." Galvin converted the goal after and Pitt led 12 to 0 at half time.

The punting duel dominated the second half. Both coaches made numerous substitutions. "Galvin and Curley of Villanova were detected exchanging punches and were sent from the game." Dewar missed a field goal and made one that was nullified due to a penalty. Pitt hung on and won 12–0.

Pitt and Villanova would not play again until 1998.

The Pitt lineup for the game against Villanova was Perry Graves (left end), Henry Blair and Enoch Pratt (left tackle), William Leahy (left guard), Ralph Galvin and John Cummins (center), Wayne Smith and George Gehlert (right guard), James Stevenson (right tackle), Hube Wagner and Bowman Ashe (right end), William Connelly and Tillie Dewar (quarterback), George Brown and S.V. Dillon (left halfback), Charles Quailey (right halfback), and Roy Kernohan (fullback). The game consisted of twelve-minute quarters.

=== Washington & Jefferson ===
Week 7: Wash. & Jeff. at Pitt

Team	1	2	3	4	Total
Wash. & Jeff.	0	0	0	0	0
• Pitt	0	0	0	12	12

- Date: November 18, 1911
- Location: Forbes Field
  Pittsburgh, PA
- Game start: 2:40 pm
- Game attendance: 10,000
- Referee: Dr. S. B. Newton (Pennsylvania)

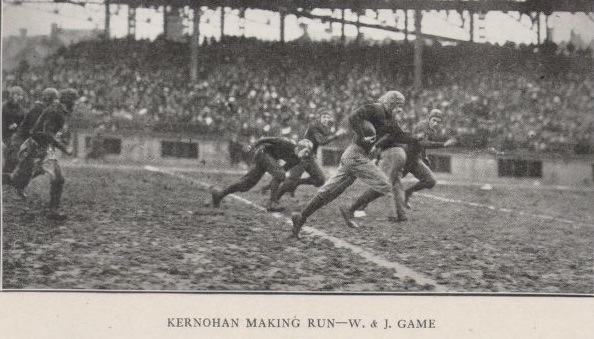
Pitt halfback Roy Kernohan gaining yardage - 1911 vs. W. & J.

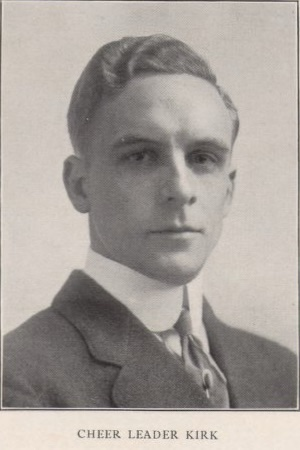
1911 Pitt cheerleader - George Kirk

The annual Western Pennsylvania Football Championship game with the Presidents of Washington & Jefferson took place on November 18. Forbes Field was "covered with inches of mud and water, but these conditions did not seem to detract from the immense enthusiasm of the monster crowd that attended the game." Ten thousand students, alumni, and fans of the rival schools were warmed up for action by both student bands. Pitt Cheerleader George Kirk and the Presidents Cheerleader Warren Burchinal "led snappy cheers that echoed across the gridiron." "The rooting duel between the rival student bodies was second only in importance to the game itself." Pitt was healthy but the Presidents' starting quarterback Goodwin did not play. Coach Mor(r)ow bemoaned "We were caught at a time when our backfield was shattered owing to Quarterback Goodwin's absence from the lineup."

The field condition predicated a punting duel and Pitt ended up punting fourteen times, while the Presidents opted to punt twenty-two times. The Pitt defense held the Red and Black without a first down and out gained them 98 yards to 16.

In the first quarter the Presidents blocked Ralph Galvin's punt and recovered the ball in Pitt territory at the 23-yard line. They advanced the ball five yards where the Pitt defense held and took over on downs. "The period was marked by no scoring and much punting."

The rest of the first half was played on W. & J.'s side of the field. Galvin blocked a punt and Ross Feightner recovered on the Red and Black 11-yard line. Three straight running plays placed the ball on the one. A holding penalty backed Pitt up fifteen yards. "Dewar on a fake kick wriggled his way to the five." Another penalty moved the ball back ten yards. W. & J. took over on downs. W. & J. punted and Galvin returned the ball to the 14-yard line. Chuck Soles gained three yards and "was put out for rough work." He was replaced by Roy Kernohan. Pitt was assessed a half the distance penalty back to their own fifty. The half ended 0 to 0.

"In the second half the Pitt team appeared in new uniforms. Neither side made any changes in their lineup." Pitt punted four times in the third quarter and Wash. & Jeff. countered with seven. The third period ended with Pitt in possession on the Presidents 45-yard line. Pitt failed to make a first down and Wagner punted. W. & J. fumbled the punt and Wayne Smith recovered it on the W. & J. 37-yard line. Dewar tried an onside kick that rolled to the two and was pounced on by George Brown. "Dewar took it to within one foot of the goal. Brown, Dewar and Quailey each tried to carry it over and on every play W. & J. was penalized for offside, the penalty each time being measured in inches." On the fifth attempt Tillie Dewar scored the touchdown and Galvin was good on the extra point. Three possessions later Brown recovered an onside kick on W. & J.'s 18-yard line. The Red and Black defense would not give up as it took another seven running plays for Brown to plow through their staunch defense and score the second Pitt touchdown. Galvin was again perfect with the goal kick. Pitt led 12 to 0. As time ran out, the Pitt offense had the ball on the Presidents' 8-yard line.

Pitt beat W. & J. for the third straight year. Wash. & Jeff. finished the season with a 6–4 record.

The Pitt lineup for the game against Washington & Jefferson was Perry Graves (left end), Ross Feightner (left tackle), William Leahy (left guard), Ralph Galvin (center), Henry Blair (right guard), James Stevenson (right tackle), Hube Wagner (right end), Tillie Dewar (quarterback), George Brown (left halfback), Charles Quailey (right halfback) and Chuck Soles (fullback). Substitutions made during the game were: Roy Kernohan replaced Chuck Soles at fullback; Wayne Smith replaced Henry Blair at right guard; Jack Lindsay replaced Hube Wagner at right end; Hube Wagner replaced Perry Graves at left end; S. V. Dillon replaced Roy Kernohan at fullback; William Connelly replaced Tillie Dewar at quarterback; and George Gehlert replaced William Leahy at left guard. The game consisted of fifteen-minute quarters.

=== Penn State ===
Week 8: Penn State. at Pitt

Team	1	2	3	4	Total
• Penn State	3	0	0	0	3
Pitt	0	0	0	0	0

- Date: November 28, 1911
- Location: Forbes Field
  Pittsburgh, PA
- Game attendance: 20,000
- Referee: J. A. Evans (Williams)

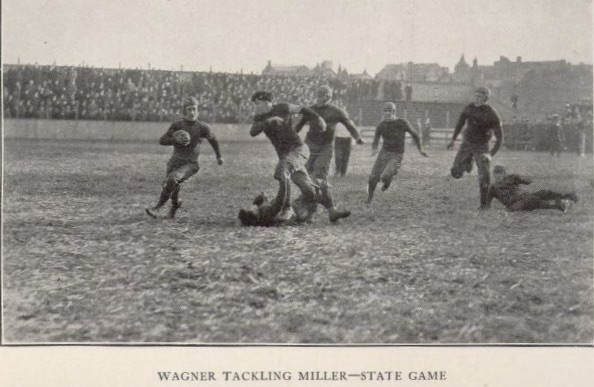
Hube Wagner tackling Penn State quarterback Miller - 1911 game

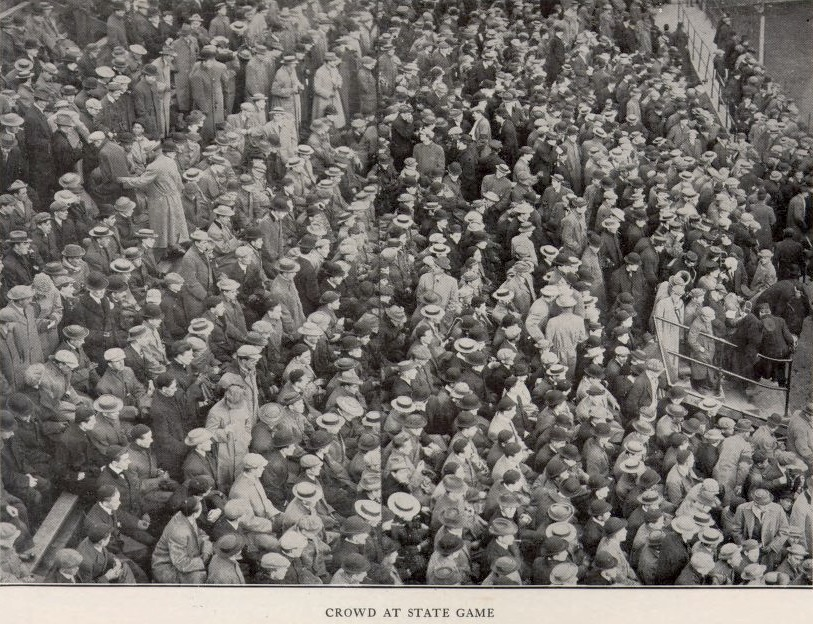
Photo of the crowd at the Pitt versus Penn State game at Forbes Field on Nov. 30, 1911

During the twelve days between the W. & J. game and Thanksgiving, Coach Thompson worked the team hard with the assistance of former players "Tex" Richards, Karl Dallenbach, Frank Van Doren and Norman Budd, in addition to his able assistants Floyd Rose and Alexander Stevenson, for their final game of the season versus Penn State.

Unbeaten Penn State under second year coach Bill Hollenback was out for revenge and needed one more win against Pitt to secure the Spalding Trophy permanently.

Graduate Manager Hurst had "six tons of straw scattered over Forbes Field to protect the ground from freezing."

The Gazette Times wrote:

"On a perfect gridiron and on a rare November afternoon the Penn State football team defeated the University of Pittsburgh eleven yesterday afternoon at Forbes Field by a score of 3–0. (Pete) Mauthe, the white and gold's fullback, kicked a goal from placement in the first quarter....The last act of the annual football drama at the University of Pittsburgh was well staged. The scenario was the bare hills of Schenley Park as a drop curtain; a dry field, scattered over with straw, was the stage, and the actors were 22 brawny young men, intent on winning for their alma maters the most important game of the year. About 20,000 persons saw the contest, the largest crowd that ever witnessed a collegiate game in western Pennsylvania."

The first quarter was played in Pitt territory. Tillie Dewar fumbled an onside kick and State recovered on Pitt's 35-yard line. State advanced the ball to the twenty-four and the Pitt defense stiffened and forced a 33 yard field goal try that missed. Pitt punted and four plays later the State offense was on the Pitt 4-yard line. The Pitt defense held and took over possession on their one. Pitt punted and State had possession on the Pitt twenty-three. On third down Pete Mauthe kicked a field goal for the only points of the game.

Early in the second quarter, Pitt advanced the ball to the State twenty-three and muffed a field goal try. They kept possession and George Brown gained eight yards to the fifteen, but they could not pick up the first down. After an exchange of punts State end Dexter Very fumbled and James Stevenson recovered for Pitt on State's thirty-yard line. Four plays advanced the ball to the five and Jack Lindsay's dropkick was blocked. The Pitt offense got the ball back and Ralph Galvin missed a twenty-five yard field goal. Pitt had the ball on the State twenty-four as the half ended.

Early in the third quarter, Penn State advanced the ball to the Pitt 14-yard line where George Brown intercepted a "Shorty" Miller pass. After a series of punts, the State offense was on the Pitt 9-yard line. State halfback King was given the ball on three straight downs but could not penetrate the goal line. After an exchange of possessions, "(Hube) Wagner intercepted State quarterback Miller's pass on Pitt's thirty-five yard line and ran to State's 36-yard line, being tackled by Very."

The fourth quarter was a punting duel played in the center of the gridiron. Tillie Dewar "had a finger and his knee dislocated, and was carried off the field." He was replaced by William Connelly, who had "a small bone in his leg broken but was able to finish the game." State had the ball on their 44-yard line as time expired. Penn State 3 to Pitt 0. Penn State took possession of the Spalding Trophy.

W. B. McVicker of The Pittsburg Press praised Hube Wagner's performance:

"I just had opportunities and few players overlook them on the gridiron." This statement was made by Hube Wagner. Pitt's star left end, who yesterday played the greatest individual game that has ever been seen on Forbes Field, although he and his teammates were defeated by their time honored rivals-Penn State, 3–0. Wagner may have taken advantage of the opportunities that came his way yesterday, but it is the consensus of opinion that most of these were made by the star end and then taken hold of...Defensively, in one period of the game he made seven consecutive tackles...During the last few seconds of the third quarter, Wagner electrified the crowd when he intercepted a State forward pass on his own 35-yard line and after eluding several opposing tacklers ran to State's 36-yard mark before being brought down by Very."

Coach Thompson proudly stated:

"I am always willing to give a rival what is due, and I am willing to concede that State played great football, but I think the Center County crowd was lucky to win. We played just as well as they did, and I fail to see where they have anything on Pitt in any department. Wagner's work was a revelation even to me, and I think I know what he can do as well as any man in the world."

The Pitt lineup for the game against Penn State was Hube Wagner (left end), Ross Feightner (left tackle), William Leahy (left guard), Ralph Galvin (center), Wayne Smith (right guard), James Stevenson (right tackle), Jack Lindsay (right end), Tillie Dewar (quarterback), George Brown (left halfback), Charles Quailey (right halfback), and Chuck Soles (fullback). Substitutions made during the game were: Henry Blair replaced William Leahy at left guard; S. V. Dillon replaced Charles Quailey at right halfback; William Connelly replaced Tillie Dewar at quarterback; Roy Kernohan replaced S. V. Dillon at right halfback; George Gehlert replaced Henry Blair at left guard; and Perry Graves replaced Jack Lindsay at left end. The game consisted of fifteen-minute quarters.

== Scoring summary ==
1911 Pittsburgh Panthers scoring summary
Player	Touchdowns	Extra points	Field goals	Points
Hube Wagner	3	0	0	15
Tillie Dewar	3	0	0	15
Ralph Galvin	0	9	1	12
Charles Quailey	2	0	0	10
William Connelly	2	0	0	10
Perry Graves	1	0	0	5
George Brown	1	0	0	5
Totals	12	9	1	72

== Postseason ==
The Joe Thompson and Jack Lindsay led 1911 Pitt football team finished the season 4–3–1. Coach Thompson's three year record was 19–5–2. On December 11, coach Thompson "announced his candidacy for the Republican nomination for the state senate in the Beaver-Lawrence district." The 1913 Owl Yearbook noted: "Joe has recently entered politics, and it is hoped that his new work will not cause him to resign his position as coach."

The football gate receipts totaled nearly $40,000 and more importantly Manager Hurst ended the season with a five thousand dollar surplus. On December 13, the University of Pittsburgh Athletic Committee appointed Charles S. Miller General Director of Athletics. "He will work in conjunction with Graduate manager Laurence B. Hurst, under whose efficient management athletics have prospered at Pitt for the past two years."

Ralph Galvin was elected Captain for the 1912 season at the banquet following the Penn State game.
