= 1911 Yale Bulldogs football team =

American college football season

1911 Yale Bulldogs football
- Conference: Independent
- Record: 7–2–1
- Head coach: John Field (1st season)
- Captain: Art Howe
- Home stadium: Yale Field

1911 Eastern college football independents records
	Conf.			Overall
Team	W	L	T	W		L		T
Penn State		–		8	–	0	–	1
Carlisle		–		11	–	1	–	0
Princeton		–		8	–	0	–	2
Trinity (CT)		–		6	–	0	–	2
Temple		–		6	–	1	–	0
Army		–		6	–	1	–	1
Swarthmore		–		6	–	1	–	1
Dartmouth		–		8	–	2	–	0
Lafayette		–		8	–	2	–	0
Yale		–		7	–	2	–	1
Harvard		–		6	–	2	–	1
Cornell		–		7	–	3	–	0
Rhode Island State		–		5	–	2	–	1
Brown		–		7	–	3	–	1
Bucknell		–		6	–	3	–	1
Penn		–		7	–	4	–	0
Pittsburgh		–		4	–	3	–	1
Washington & Jefferson		–		6	–	4	–	0
Syracuse		–		5	–	3	–	2
Dickinson		–		4	–	4	–	0
Lehigh		–		5	–	5	–	1
Rutgers		–		4	–	4	–	1
Dickinson		–		4	–	4	–	0
St. Bonaventure		–		2	–	2	–	0
Carnegie Tech		–		4	–	5	–	0
Holy Cross		–		4	–	5	–	0
Tufts		–		3	–	4	–	0
Vermont		–		3	–	5	–	0
NYU		–		1	–	3	–	3
Colgate		–		3	–	6	–	0
Franklin & Marshall		–		3	–	6	–	0
New Hampshire		–		1	–	5	–	1
Geneva		–		1	–	6	–	1
Villanova		–		0	–	5	–	1
Boston College		–		0	–	7	–	0

The 1911 Yale Bulldogs football team represented Yale University in the 1911 college football season. The Bulldogs finished with a 7–2–1 record under first-year head coach John Field.

Three Yale players, end Douglas Bomeisler, center Hank Ketcham and quarterback Art Howe, were consensus picks for the 1911 College Football All-America Team. Walter Camp's son, Walter C. Camp, Jr., played at the halfback position for the 1911 Bulldogs and received second-team All-America honors from his father and from Wilton S. Farnsworth. Yale fullback Jesse Philbin also received first-team All-America honors from Farnsworth.

== Schedule ==
Date	Opponent	Site	Result	Attendance	Source
September 27	Wesleyan	Yale Field; New Haven, CT	W 21–0		
September 30	Holy Cross	Yale Field; New Haven, CT	W 26–0		
October 7	Syracuse	Yale Field; New Haven, CT	W 12–0		
October 14	VPI	Yale Field; New Haven, CT	W 33–0		
October 21	at Army	The Plain; West Point, NY	L 0–6		
October 28	Colgate	Yale Field; New Haven, CT	W 23–0		
November 4	NYU	Yale Field; New Haven, CT	W 28–3		
November 11	Brown	Yale Field; New Haven, CT	W 15–0		
November 18	Princeton	Yale Field; New Haven, CT (rivalry)	L 3–6	35,000	
November 25	at Harvard	Harvard Stadium; Boston, MA (rivalry)	T 0–0		

== Roster ==
- Sidney W. Anderson, HB
- Benjamin Avery, E
- Douglas Bomeisler, E
- E. Bomeisler, E
- Walter C. Camp, HB
- Clarence Childs, G
- David L. Dunn, FB
- Pomeroy T. Francis, G
- Edgar W. Freeman, HB
- Carl Gallauer, E
- Art Howe, QB
- William F. Howe, E
- Hank Ketcham, C
- Robert F. Loree, C
- Henry A. Marting, T
- Elmer McDevitt, G
- Harry N. Merritt, QB
- Mitchell, HB
- Charles H. Paul, T
- Henry E. Perry, T
- Jesse H. Philbin, FB
- James A. Reilly, HB
- James W. Scully, T
- Ogilvie H. Sheldon
- Jesse Spalding, HB
- Edwin A. Strout
- Daniel G. Tomlinson, T
- William C. Warren, T
- Wentworth, FB
