= 1911 Washington & Jefferson Red and Black football team =

American college football season

1911 Washington & Jefferson Red and Black football
- Conference: Independent
- Record: 6–4
- Head coach: David C. Morrow (4th season)
- Home stadium: College Park

1911 Eastern college football independents records
	Conf.			Overall
Team	W	L	T	W		L		T
Penn State		–		8	–	0	–	1
Carlisle		–		11	–	1	–	0
Princeton		–		8	–	0	–	2
Trinity (CT)		–		6	–	0	–	2
Temple		–		6	–	1	–	0
Army		–		6	–	1	–	1
Swarthmore		–		6	–	1	–	1
Dartmouth		–		8	–	2	–	0
Lafayette		–		8	–	2	–	0
Yale		–		7	–	2	–	1
Harvard		–		6	–	2	–	1
Cornell		–		7	–	3	–	0
Rhode Island State		–		5	–	2	–	1
Brown		–		7	–	3	–	1
Bucknell		–		6	–	3	–	1
Penn		–		7	–	4	–	0
Pittsburgh		–		4	–	3	–	1
Washington & Jefferson		–		6	–	4	–	0
Syracuse		–		5	–	3	–	2
Dickinson		–		4	–	4	–	0
Lehigh		–		5	–	5	–	1
Rutgers		–		4	–	4	–	1
Dickinson		–		4	–	4	–	0
St. Bonaventure		–		2	–	2	–	0
Carnegie Tech		–		4	–	5	–	0
Holy Cross		–		4	–	5	–	0
Tufts		–		3	–	4	–	0
Vermont		–		3	–	5	–	0
NYU		–		1	–	3	–	3
Colgate		–		3	–	6	–	0
Franklin & Marshall		–		3	–	6	–	0
New Hampshire		–		1	–	5	–	1
Geneva		–		1	–	6	–	1
Villanova		–		0	–	5	–	1
Boston College		–		0	–	7	–	0

The 1911 Washington & Jefferson Red and Black football team represented Washington & Jefferson College as an independent during the 1911 college football season. Led by fourth-year head David C. Morrow, Washington & Jefferson compiled a record of 6–4.

== Schedule ==
Date	Time	Opponent	Site	Result	Attendance	Source
September 30	3:30 p.m.	Indiana Normal (PA)	College Park; Washington, PA	W 12–0		
October 7		Bethany (WV)	Washington, PA	W 42–0		
October 14		at Navy	Worden Field; Annapolis, MD	L 0–16		
October 21		at Cornell	Percy Field; Ithaca, NY	L 0–6		
October 28		Westminster (PA)	College Park; Washington, PA	W 33–0		
November 4		at West Virginia	Morgantown, WV	L 5–6		
November 7		at Latrobe	Latrobe, PA	W 12–0		
November 11		Geneva	Washington, PA	W 19–0		
November 18	2:40 p.m.	at Pittsburgh	Forbes Field; Pittsburgh, PA	L 0–12	10,000	
November 25		Villanova	Washington, PA	W 11–6		
