= 1911 Rutgers Queensmen football team =

American college football season

1911 Rutgers Queensmen football
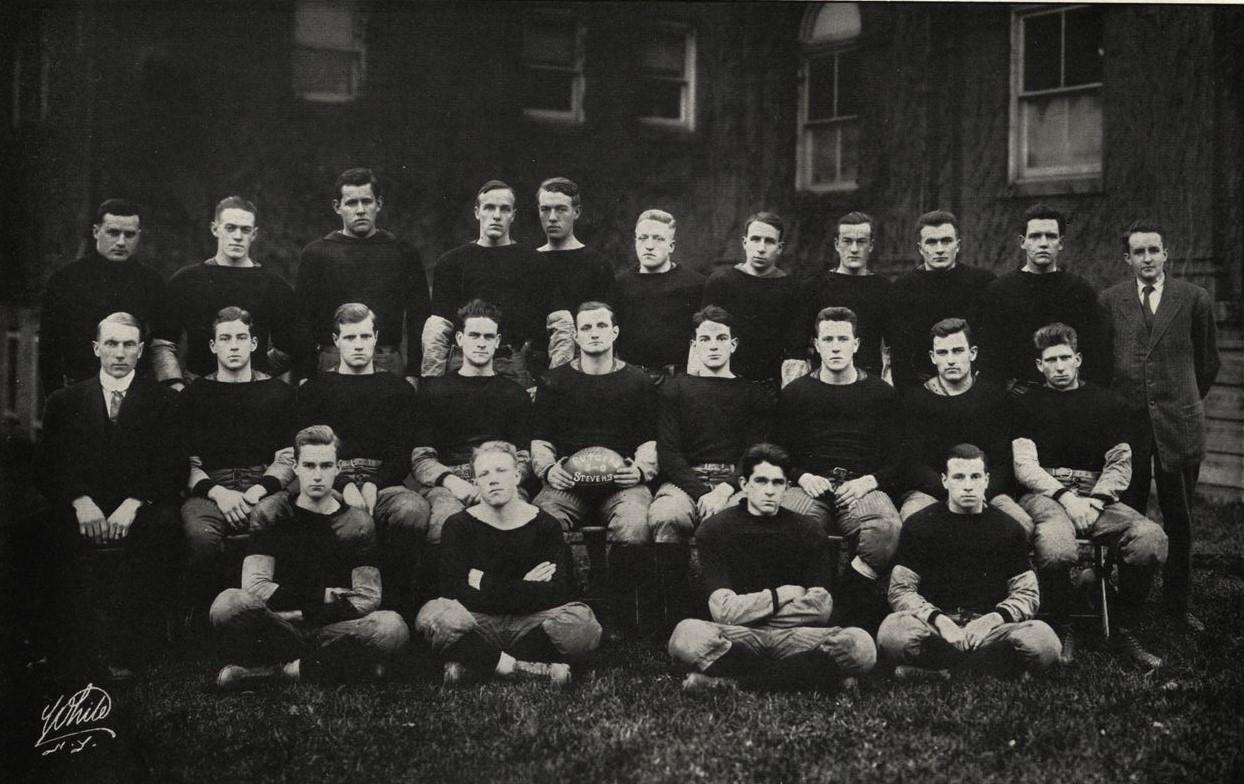
- Conference: Independent
- Record: 4–4–1
- Head coach: Howard Gargan (2nd season)
- Captain: James K. Alverson
- Home stadium: Neilson Field

1911 Eastern college football independents records
	Conf.			Overall
Team	W	L	T	W		L		T
Penn State		–		8	–	0	–	1
Carlisle		–		11	–	1	–	0
Princeton		–		8	–	0	–	2
Trinity (CT)		–		6	–	0	–	2
Temple		–		6	–	1	–	0
Army		–		6	–	1	–	1
Swarthmore		–		6	–	1	–	1
Dartmouth		–		8	–	2	–	0
Lafayette		–		8	–	2	–	0
Yale		–		7	–	2	–	1
Harvard		–		6	–	2	–	1
Cornell		–		7	–	3	–	0
Rhode Island State		–		5	–	2	–	1
Brown		–		7	–	3	–	1
Bucknell		–		6	–	3	–	1
Penn		–		7	–	4	–	0
Pittsburgh		–		4	–	3	–	1
Washington & Jefferson		–		6	–	4	–	0
Syracuse		–		5	–	3	–	2
Dickinson		–		4	–	4	–	0
Lehigh		–		5	–	5	–	1
Rutgers		–		4	–	4	–	1
Dickinson		–		4	–	4	–	0
St. Bonaventure		–		2	–	2	–	0
Carnegie Tech		–		4	–	5	–	0
Holy Cross		–		4	–	5	–	0
Tufts		–		3	–	4	–	0
Vermont		–		3	–	5	–	0
NYU		–		1	–	3	–	3
Colgate		–		3	–	6	–	0
Franklin & Marshall		–		3	–	6	–	0
New Hampshire		–		1	–	5	–	1
Geneva		–		1	–	6	–	1
Villanova		–		0	–	5	–	1
Boston College		–		0	–	7	–	0

The 1911 Rutgers Queensmen football team was an American football team that represented Rutgers University as an independent during the 1911 college football season. The 1911 Rutgers team compiled a 4–4–1 record and was outscored by opponents by a combined total of 99 to 25. Howard Gargan was the team's coach, and James K. Alverson was the team captain.

== Schedule ==
Date	Opponent	Site	Result	Source
October 4	at Princeton	Osborne Field; Princeton, NJ (rivalry)	L 0–37	
October 7	Haverford	Neilson Field; New Brunswick, NJ	W 10–6	
October 14	at Army	The Plain; West Point, NY	L 0–18	
October 21	Union (NY)	Neilson Field; New Brunswick, NJ	W 6–0	
October 28	at Swarthmore	Whittier Field; Swarthmore, PA	L 0–21	
November 4	RPI	Neilson Field; New Brunswick, NJ	W 6–0	
November 11	at NYU	Ohio Field; Bronx, NY	T 0–0	
November 18	Ursinus	Neilson Field; New Brunswick, NJ	L 0–17	
November 25	at Stevens	Stevens Field; Hoboken, NJ	W 3–0	

== Roster ==
The players on the 1911 football team were as follows.

- Henry Clifton Cooper, left end, Palmyra, NJ, Class of 1912
- G. Raymond Robinson, left end, Class of 1913
- Toohey, left tackle, Class of 1914
- Theodore Van Winkle, left guard, Class of 1913
- Julie, center, Class of 1913
- Samuel Furman Foster, right guard, Bayhead, NJ, Class of 1912
- Alfred Bentley Titsworth, right guard, Plainfield, NJ, Class of 1912
- McCallum, right tackle, Class of 1914
- John F. McGovern, right end, New Brunswick, NJ, Class of 1912
- Herbert M. Bergamini, right end, Class of 1913
- Todd, right end, Class of 1914
- Dexter White, quarterback, New York, NY, Class of 1912
- Elmendorf, quarterback, Class of 1914
- Frederick J. Johnson, left halfback, Class of 1913
- Gay, right halfback, Class of 1915
- James K. Alverson, fullback, East Orange, NJ, Class of 1912
