= 1911 Bucknell football team =

American college football season

1911 Bucknell football
- Conference: Independent
- Record: 6–3–1
- Head coach: Byron W. Dickson (2nd season)

1911 Eastern college football independents records
	Conf.			Overall
Team	W	L	T	W		L		T
Penn State		–		8	–	0	–	1
Carlisle		–		11	–	1	–	0
Princeton		–		8	–	0	–	2
Trinity (CT)		–		6	–	0	–	2
Temple		–		6	–	1	–	0
Army		–		6	–	1	–	1
Swarthmore		–		6	–	1	–	1
Dartmouth		–		8	–	2	–	0
Lafayette		–		8	–	2	–	0
Yale		–		7	–	2	–	1
Harvard		–		6	–	2	–	1
Cornell		–		7	–	3	–	0
Rhode Island State		–		5	–	2	–	1
Brown		–		7	–	3	–	1
Bucknell		–		6	–	3	–	1
Penn		–		7	–	4	–	0
Pittsburgh		–		4	–	3	–	1
Washington & Jefferson		–		6	–	4	–	0
Syracuse		–		5	–	3	–	2
Dickinson		–		4	–	4	–	0
Lehigh		–		5	–	5	–	1
Rutgers		–		4	–	4	–	1
Dickinson		–		4	–	4	–	0
St. Bonaventure		–		2	–	2	–	0
Carnegie Tech		–		4	–	5	–	0
Holy Cross		–		4	–	5	–	0
Tufts		–		3	–	4	–	0
Vermont		–		3	–	5	–	0
NYU		–		1	–	3	–	3
Colgate		–		3	–	6	–	0
Franklin & Marshall		–		3	–	6	–	0
New Hampshire		–		1	–	5	–	1
Geneva		–		1	–	6	–	1
Villanova		–		0	–	5	–	1
Boston College		–		0	–	7	–	0

The 1911 Bucknell football team was an American football team that represented Bucknell University as an independent during the 1911 college football season. In its second season under head coach Byron W. Dickson, the team compiled a 6–3–1 record.

== Schedule ==
Date	Opponent	Site	Result	Attendance	Source
September 30	Lock Haven Normal	Lewisburg, PA	W 19–0		
October 7	at Lehigh	Lehigh Field; South Bethlehem, PA	W 3–0		
October 14	Wyoming Seminary	Lewisburg, PA	W 22–0		
October 19	at North Carolina A&M	Riddick Stadium; Raleigh, NC	L 0–6		
October 28	at Rochester	Baseball Park; Rochester, NY	W 5–0		
November 4	at Lafayette	March Field; Easton, PA	L 0–6		
November 14	at Army	The Plain; West Point, NY	L 2–20		
November 18	at Muhlenberg	Muhlenberg Field; Allentown, PA	W 20–3		
November 25	Haverford	Lewisburg, PA	W 15–0		
November 30	at Ursinus	Reading, PA	T 3–3		
