= 1911 Boston College football team =

American college football season

1911 Boston College football
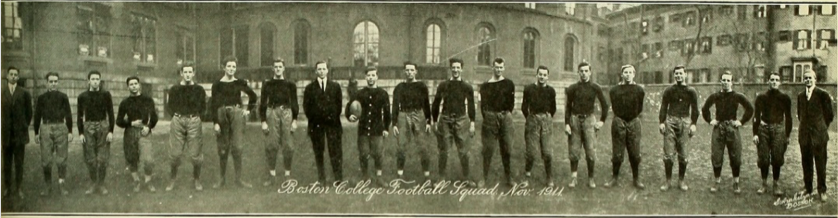
- Conference: Independent
- Record: 0–7
- Head coach: Joseph Courtney (1st season)
- Captains: John Hartigan; Dan Hurld

1911 Eastern college football independents records
	Conf.			Overall
Team	W	L	T	W		L		T
Penn State		–		8	–	0	–	1
Carlisle		–		11	–	1	–	0
Princeton		–		8	–	0	–	2
Trinity (CT)		–		6	–	0	–	2
Temple		–		6	–	1	–	0
Army		–		6	–	1	–	1
Swarthmore		–		6	–	1	–	1
Dartmouth		–		8	–	2	–	0
Lafayette		–		8	–	2	–	0
Yale		–		7	–	2	–	1
Harvard		–		6	–	2	–	1
Cornell		–		7	–	3	–	0
Rhode Island State		–		5	–	2	–	1
Brown		–		7	–	3	–	1
Bucknell		–		6	–	3	–	1
Penn		–		7	–	4	–	0
Pittsburgh		–		4	–	3	–	1
Washington & Jefferson		–		6	–	4	–	0
Syracuse		–		5	–	3	–	2
Dickinson		–		4	–	4	–	0
Lehigh		–		5	–	5	–	1
Rutgers		–		4	–	4	–	1
Dickinson		–		4	–	4	–	0
St. Bonaventure		–		2	–	2	–	0
Carnegie Tech		–		4	–	5	–	0
Holy Cross		–		4	–	5	–	0
Tufts		–		3	–	4	–	0
Vermont		–		3	–	5	–	0
NYU		–		1	–	3	–	3
Colgate		–		3	–	6	–	0
Franklin & Marshall		–		3	–	6	–	0
New Hampshire		–		1	–	5	–	1
Geneva		–		1	–	6	–	1
Villanova		–		0	–	5	–	1
Boston College		–		0	–	7	–	0

The 1911 Boston College football team was an American football team that represented Boston College as an independent during the 1911 college football season. Led by first-year head coach Joseph Courtney, the team compiled a record of 0–7.

== Schedule ==
Date	Opponent	Site	Result	Source
September 23	at Holy Cross	Fitton Field; Worcester, MA (rivalry)	L 0–13	
October 14	at Colby	Waterville, ME	L 0–18	
October 21	at New Hampshire	Durham, NH	L 0–12	
October 28	at Cushing Academy	Ashburnham, MA	L 0–17	
November 11	at Rhode Island State	Kingston, RI	L 0–25	
November 25	at Dean Academy	Franklin, MA	L 0–6	
November 30	at Saint Anselm	Manchester, NH	L 3–5	

Note: Boston College's media guide lists the Holy Cross game as a 13–5 defeat; however, contemporary newspapers reported it as 13–0.
