= 1911 Army Cadets football team =

American college football season

1911 Army Cadets football
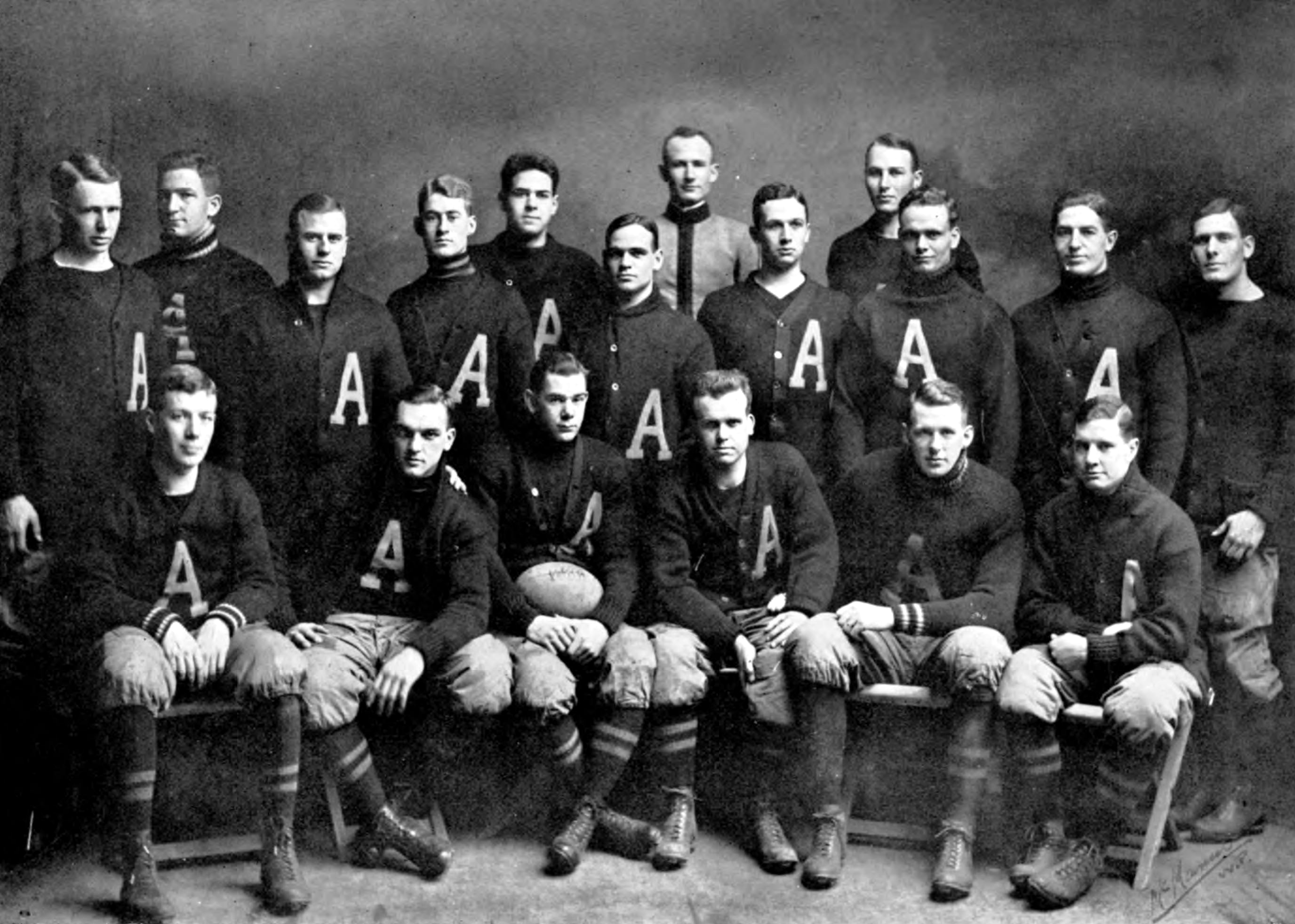
- Conference: Independent
- Record: 6–1–1
- Head coach: Joseph Beacham (1st season)
- Captain: Robert Hyatt
- Home stadium: The Plain

1911 Eastern college football independents records
	Conf.			Overall
Team	W	L	T	W		L		T
Penn State		–		8	–	0	–	1
Carlisle		–		11	–	1	–	0
Princeton		–		8	–	0	–	2
Trinity (CT)		–		6	–	0	–	2
Temple		–		6	–	1	–	0
Army		–		6	–	1	–	1
Swarthmore		–		6	–	1	–	1
Dartmouth		–		8	–	2	–	0
Lafayette		–		8	–	2	–	0
Yale		–		7	–	2	–	1
Harvard		–		6	–	2	–	1
Cornell		–		7	–	3	–	0
Rhode Island State		–		5	–	2	–	1
Brown		–		7	–	3	–	1
Bucknell		–		6	–	3	–	1
Penn		–		7	–	4	–	0
Pittsburgh		–		4	–	3	–	1
Washington & Jefferson		–		6	–	4	–	0
Syracuse		–		5	–	3	–	2
Dickinson		–		4	–	4	–	0
Lehigh		–		5	–	5	–	1
Rutgers		–		4	–	4	–	1
Dickinson		–		4	–	4	–	0
St. Bonaventure		–		2	–	2	–	0
Carnegie Tech		–		4	–	5	–	0
Holy Cross		–		4	–	5	–	0
Tufts		–		3	–	4	–	0
Vermont		–		3	–	5	–	0
NYU		–		1	–	3	–	3
Colgate		–		3	–	6	–	0
Franklin & Marshall		–		3	–	6	–	0
New Hampshire		–		1	–	5	–	1
Geneva		–		1	–	6	–	1
Villanova		–		0	–	5	–	1
Boston College		–		0	–	7	–	0

The 1911 Army Cadets football team represented the United States Military Academy as an independent during the 1911 college football season. In their first and only season under head coach Joseph Beacham, the Cadets compiled a 6–1–1 record, shut out five of their eight opponents (including a scoreless tie with Georgetown), and outscored all opponents by a combined total of 88 to 11, an average of 11.0 points scored and 1.4 points allowed. The Cadets' only loss came against the Navy Midshipmen by a 3 to 0 score in the annual Army–Navy Game.

Tackle Leland Devore was a consensus first-team player on the All-America team. Other notable players on the 1911 Army team include center Franklin C. Sibert, guard Archibald V. Arnold, and tackle Robert M. Littlejohn.

== Schedule ==
Date	Opponent	Site	Result	Source
October 7	Vermont	The Plain; West Point, NY	W 12–0	
October 14	Rutgers	The Plain; West Point, NY	W 18–0	
October 21	Yale	The Plain; West Point, NY	W 6–0	
October 28	Lehigh	The Plain; West Point, NY	W 20–0	
November 4	Georgetown	The Plain; West Point, NY	T 0–0	
November 11	Bucknell	The Plain; West Point, NY	W 20–2	
November 18	Colgate	The Plain; West Point, NY	W 12–6	
November 25	vs. Navy	Franklin Field; Philadelphia, PA (Army–Navy Game)	L 0–3	
