= 1914 Fordham Maroon football team =

American college football season

1914 Fordham Maroon football
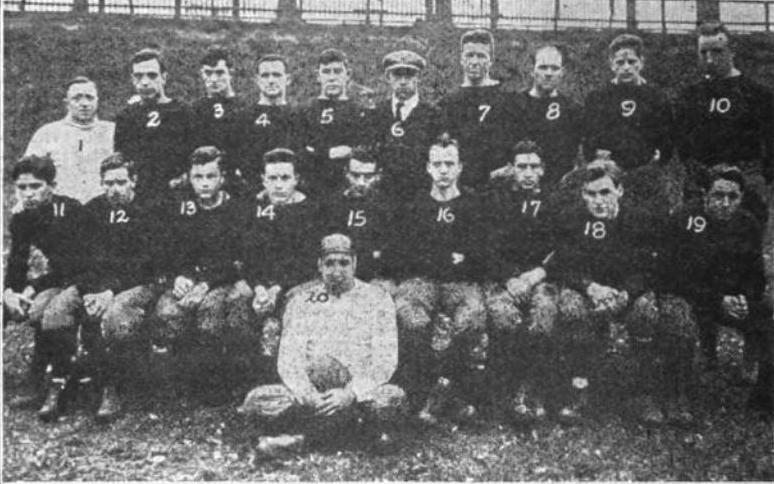
- Conference: Independent
- Record: 18–4–1 / 6–3–1
- Head coach: Skip Wymard (1st season)
- Captain: Charles Wymard
- Home stadium: Fordham Field

1914 Eastern college football independents records
	Conf.			Overall
Team	W	L	T	W		L		T
Army		–		9	–	0	–	0
Harvard		–		7	–	0	–	2
Washington & Jefferson		–		10	–	1	–	0
Dartmouth		–		8	–	1	–	0
Lehigh		–		8	–	1	–	0
Pittsburgh		–		8	–	1	–	0
Cornell		–		8	–	2	–	0
Yale		–		7	–	2	–	0
Franklin & Marshall		–		6	–	2	–	1
Colgate		–		5	–	2	–	1
Princeton		–		5	–	2	–	1
Brown		–		5	–	2	–	2
Fordham		–		6	–	3	–	1
Geneva		–		5	–	3	–	0
Tufts		–		5	–	3	–	0
Penn State		–		5	–	3	–	1
Rutgers		–		5	–	3	–	1
Lafayette		–		5	–	3	–	2
Syracuse		–		5	–	3	–	2
Boston College		–		5	–	4	–	0
NYU		–		5	–	4	–	0
Villanova		–		4	–	3	–	1
Bucknell		–		4	–	4	–	1
Carnegie Tech		–		4	–	4	–	0
Penn		–		4	–	4	–	1
Temple		–		3	–	3	–	0
Rhode Island State		–		2	–	3	–	3
Carlisle		–		5	–	10	–	1
Holy Cross		–		2	–	5	–	1
Vermont		–		2	–	6	–	1
New Hampshire		–		1	–	6	–	2
Duquesne		–		1	–	5	–	0

The 1914 Fordham Maroon football team was an American football team that represented Fordham University as an independent during the 1914 college football season. Fordham claims an 18–4–1 record. College Football Data Warehouse (CFDW) lists the team's record at 6–3–1.

Skip Wymard was the head coach, and Charles Wymard was the captain. The team played its home games at Fordham Field in The Bronx.

== Schedule ==
The following ten games are reported in Fordham's media guide, CFDW and contemporaneous press coverage.

Date	Opponent	Site	Result	Source
September 26	at Georgetown	Washington, DC	T 0–0	
October 3	Gallaudet	Fordham Field; Bronx, NY	W 7–6	
October 10	Rochester	Fordham Field; Bronx, NY	W 21–0	
October 17	Middlebury	Fordham Field; Bronx, NY	W 28–0	
October 24	Rhode Island State	Fordham Field; Bronx, NY	W 21–0	
November 3	Gettysburg	Fordham Field; Bronx, NY	W 21–2	
November 7	Navy	Annapolis, MD	L 0–21	
November 14	Vermont	Fordham Field; Bronx, NY	L 6–7	
November 21	Boston College	Fordham Field; Bronx, NY	W 14–3	
November 26	Villanova	Fordham Field; Bronx, NY	L 6–7	

The following are 13 additional games reported in the Fordham media guide.

Date	Opponent	Site	Result
	USS Texas		W 27–0
	USS Arkansas		W 24–7
	Fort Slocum		L 0–6
	Bedford Athletic Club		W 10–6
	Fort Wadsworth		W 21–0
	Mount Saint Mary's		W
	NYU		W 18–6
	Fort Slocum		W 10–7
	Fort Hancock		W 16–14
	Rhode Island State		W 36–0
	St. Peter's		W 38–16
	Pratt		L 6–8
	Cathedral		W
