= 1914 Rhode Island State football team =

American college football season

1914 Rhode Island State football
- Conference: Independent
- Record: 2–3–3
- Head coach: George Cobb (5th season)

1914 Eastern college football independents records
| | Conf. | | | Overall |
| Team | W | L | T | W | | L | | T |
|---|---|---|---|---|---|---|---|---|
| Army | | – | | 9 | – | 0 | – | 0 |
| Harvard | | – | | 7 | – | 0 | – | 2 |
| Washington & Jefferson | | – | | 10 | – | 1 | – | 0 |
| Dartmouth | | – | | 8 | – | 1 | – | 0 |
| Lehigh | | – | | 8 | – | 1 | – | 0 |
| Pittsburgh | | – | | 8 | – | 1 | – | 0 |
| Cornell | | – | | 8 | – | 2 | – | 0 |
| Yale | | – | | 7 | – | 2 | – | 0 |
| Franklin & Marshall | | – | | 6 | – | 2 | – | 1 |
| Colgate | | – | | 5 | – | 2 | – | 1 |
| Princeton | | – | | 5 | – | 2 | – | 1 |
| Brown | | – | | 5 | – | 2 | – | 2 |
| Fordham | | – | | 6 | – | 3 | – | 1 |
| Geneva | | – | | 5 | – | 3 | – | 0 |
| Tufts | | – | | 5 | – | 3 | – | 0 |
| Penn State | | – | | 5 | – | 3 | – | 1 |
| Rutgers | | – | | 5 | – | 3 | – | 1 |
| Lafayette | | – | | 5 | – | 3 | – | 2 |
| Syracuse | | – | | 5 | – | 3 | – | 2 |
| Boston College | | – | | 5 | – | 4 | – | 0 |
| NYU | | – | | 5 | – | 4 | – | 0 |
| Villanova | | – | | 4 | – | 3 | – | 1 |
| Bucknell | | – | | 4 | – | 4 | – | 1 |
| Carnegie Tech | | – | | 4 | – | 4 | – | 0 |
| Penn | | – | | 4 | – | 4 | – | 1 |
| Temple | | – | | 3 | – | 3 | – | 0 |
| Rhode Island State | | – | | 2 | – | 3 | – | 3 |
| Carlisle | | – | | 5 | – | 10 | – | 1 |
| Holy Cross | | – | | 2 | – | 5 | – | 1 |
| Vermont | | – | | 2 | – | 6 | – | 1 |
| New Hampshire | | – | | 1 | – | 6 | – | 2 |
| Duquesne | | – | | 1 | – | 5 | – | 0 |

The 1914 Rhode Island State football team was an American football team that represented Rhode Island State College (later renamed the University of Rhode Island) as an independent during the 1914 college football season. In its fifth year under head coach George Cobb, the team compiled a 2–3–3 record.

== Schedule ==
| Date | Opponent | Site | Result | Source |
|---|---|---|---|---|
| September 26 | at Wesleyan | Middletown, CT | T 0–0 | |
| October 3 | at Brown | Andrews Field; Providence, RI (rivalry) | L 0–20 | |
| October 10 | Boston College | Kingston, RI | L 0–21 | |
| October 17 | East Greenwich Academy | Kingston, RI | W 6–0 | |
| October 24 | at Fordham | Fordham Field; Bronx, NY | L 0–21 | |
| October 31 | New Hampshire | Kingston, RI | W 7–0 | |
| November 7 | Worcester Tech | Kingston, RI | T 6–6 | |
| November 14 | at New Hampshire | Textile Field; Manchester, NH | T 0–0 | |
