= 1914 Carlisle Indians football team =

American college football season

1914 Carlisle Indians football
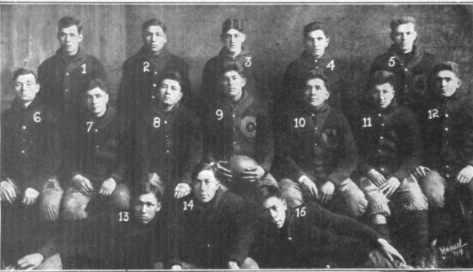
- Conference: Independent
- Record: 5–10–1
- Head coach: Pop Warner (13th season)
- Captains: Elmer Busch; Pete Calac
- Home stadium: Indian Field

1914 Eastern college football independents records
	Conf.			Overall
Team	W	L	T	W		L		T
Army		–		9	–	0	–	0
Harvard		–		7	–	0	–	2
Washington & Jefferson		–		10	–	1	–	0
Dartmouth		–		8	–	1	–	0
Lehigh		–		8	–	1	–	0
Pittsburgh		–		8	–	1	–	0
Cornell		–		8	–	2	–	0
Yale		–		7	–	2	–	0
Franklin & Marshall		–		6	–	2	–	1
Colgate		–		5	–	2	–	1
Princeton		–		5	–	2	–	1
Brown		–		5	–	2	–	2
Fordham		–		6	–	3	–	1
Geneva		–		5	–	3	–	0
Tufts		–		5	–	3	–	0
Penn State		–		5	–	3	–	1
Rutgers		–		5	–	3	–	1
Lafayette		–		5	–	3	–	2
Syracuse		–		5	–	3	–	2
Boston College		–		5	–	4	–	0
NYU		–		5	–	4	–	0
Villanova		–		4	–	3	–	1
Bucknell		–		4	–	4	–	1
Carnegie Tech		–		4	–	4	–	0
Penn		–		4	–	4	–	1
Temple		–		3	–	3	–	0
Rhode Island State		–		2	–	3	–	3
Carlisle		–		5	–	10	–	1
Holy Cross		–		2	–	5	–	1
Vermont		–		2	–	6	–	1
New Hampshire		–		1	–	6	–	2
Duquesne		–		1	–	5	–	0

The 1914 Carlisle Indians football team represented the Carlisle Indian Industrial School as an independent during the 1914 college football season. Led by Pop Warner in his 13th and final season as head coach, the Indians compiled a record of 5–10–1 and were outscored by opponents 207 to 125. Elmer Busch was team captain in the early season, but was replaced in that role by Pete Calac.

== Schedule ==
Date	Opponent	Site	Result	Attendance	Source
September 19	Albright	Indian Field; Carlisle, PA	W 20–0		
September 23	Lebanon Valley	Indian Field; Carlisle, PA	W 7–0		
September 26	at West Virginia Wesleyan	Clarksburg, WV	W 6–0		
October 3	at Lehigh	Taylor Stadium; Bethlehem, PA	L 6–21		
October 10	at Cornell	Ithaca, NY	L 0–21		
October 17	at Pittsburgh	Forbes Field; Pittsburgh, PA	L 3–10		
October 24	at Penn	Franklin Field; Philadelphia, PA	L 0–7		
October 31	vs. Syracuse	Federal League Park; Buffalo, NY	L 3–24	9,000	
November 7	vs. Holy Cross	Textile Field; Manchester, NH	T 0–0		
November 14	vs. Notre Dame	Comiskey Park; Chicago, IL	L 6–48		
November 21	at Dickinson	Biddle Field; Carlisle, PA	W 34–0		
November 24	at Delaware	Newark, DE	L 0–33		
November 26	at Brown	Andrews Field; Providence, RI	L 14–20		
November 28	at New England All Stars	Boston, MA	L 6–13		
December 2	at Alabama	Rickwood Field; Birmingham, AL	W 20–3		
December 5	vs. Auburn	Grant Field; Atlanta, GA	L 0–7		

== See also ==
- 1914 College Football All-America Team
