= 1914 Holy Cross football team =

American college football season

1914 Holy Cross football
- Conference: Independent
- Record: 2–5–1
- Head coach: Luke Kelly (1st season)
- Captain: Walter Mullen
- Home stadium: Fitton Field

1914 Eastern college football independents records
| | Conf. | | | Overall |
| Team | W | L | T | W | | L | | T |
|---|---|---|---|---|---|---|---|---|
| Army | | – | | 9 | – | 0 | – | 0 |
| Harvard | | – | | 7 | – | 0 | – | 2 |
| Washington & Jefferson | | – | | 10 | – | 1 | – | 0 |
| Dartmouth | | – | | 8 | – | 1 | – | 0 |
| Lehigh | | – | | 8 | – | 1 | – | 0 |
| Pittsburgh | | – | | 8 | – | 1 | – | 0 |
| Cornell | | – | | 8 | – | 2 | – | 0 |
| Yale | | – | | 7 | – | 2 | – | 0 |
| Franklin & Marshall | | – | | 6 | – | 2 | – | 1 |
| Colgate | | – | | 5 | – | 2 | – | 1 |
| Princeton | | – | | 5 | – | 2 | – | 1 |
| Brown | | – | | 5 | – | 2 | – | 2 |
| Fordham | | – | | 6 | – | 3 | – | 1 |
| Geneva | | – | | 5 | – | 3 | – | 0 |
| Tufts | | – | | 5 | – | 3 | – | 0 |
| Penn State | | – | | 5 | – | 3 | – | 1 |
| Rutgers | | – | | 5 | – | 3 | – | 1 |
| Lafayette | | – | | 5 | – | 3 | – | 2 |
| Syracuse | | – | | 5 | – | 3 | – | 2 |
| Boston College | | – | | 5 | – | 4 | – | 0 |
| NYU | | – | | 5 | – | 4 | – | 0 |
| Villanova | | – | | 4 | – | 3 | – | 1 |
| Bucknell | | – | | 4 | – | 4 | – | 1 |
| Carnegie Tech | | – | | 4 | – | 4 | – | 0 |
| Penn | | – | | 4 | – | 4 | – | 1 |
| Temple | | – | | 3 | – | 3 | – | 0 |
| Rhode Island State | | – | | 2 | – | 3 | – | 3 |
| Carlisle | | – | | 5 | – | 10 | – | 1 |
| Holy Cross | | – | | 2 | – | 5 | – | 1 |
| Vermont | | – | | 2 | – | 6 | – | 1 |
| New Hampshire | | – | | 1 | – | 6 | – | 2 |
| Duquesne | | – | | 1 | – | 5 | – | 0 |

The 1914 Holy Cross football team was an American football team that represented the College of the Holy Cross in the 1914 college football season.

In its first year under head coach Luke Kelly, the team compiled a 2–5–1 record. Walter Mullen was the team captain.

Holy Cross played its home games at Fitton Field on the college campus in Worcester, Massachusetts.

== Schedule ==
| Date | Opponent | Site | Result | Source |
|---|---|---|---|---|
| September 26 | Colby | Fitton Field; Worcester, MA | L 0–17 | |
| October 3 | Massachusetts | Fitton Field; Worcester, MA | L 0–14 | |
| October 10 | at Springfield YMCA | Pratt Field; Springfield, MA | L 0–25 | |
| October 24 | at Army | The Plain; West Point, NY | L 0–14 | |
| October 31 | at Cornell | Percy Field; Ithaca, NY | L 3–48 | |
| November 7 | vs. Carlisle | Textile Field; Manchester, NH | T 0–0 | |
| November 14 | Boston College | Fitton Field; Worcester, MA (rivalry) | W 10–0 | |
| November 26 | Vermont | Fitton Field; Worcester, MA | W 7–0 | |
