= 1914 New Hampshire football team =

American college football season

1914 New Hampshire football
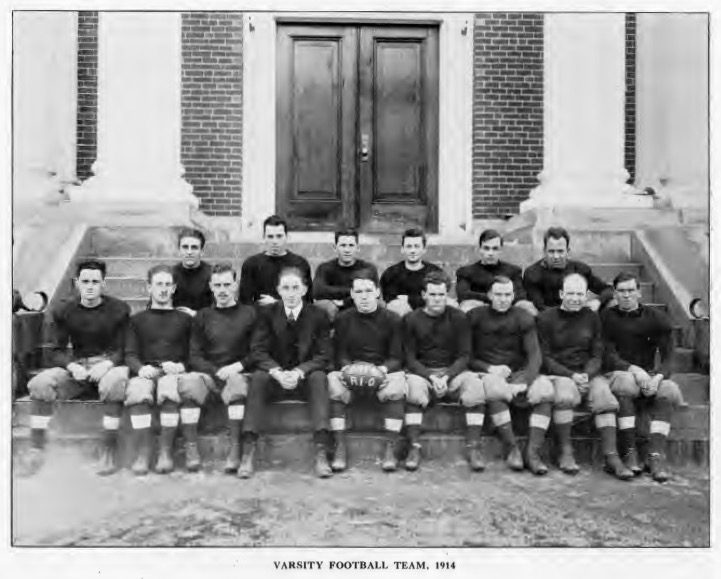
- Conference: Independent
- Record: 1–6–2
- Head coach: Thomas D. Shepherd (1st season)
- Captain: Paul E. Corriveau (Note: Corriveau was killed in action in France in 1918 while serving in the United States Marine Corps.)
- Home stadium: College grounds, Durham, NH

1914 Eastern college football independents records
	Conf.			Overall
Team	W	L	T	W		L		T
Army		–		9	–	0	–	0
Harvard		–		7	–	0	–	2
Washington & Jefferson		–		10	–	1	–	0
Dartmouth		–		8	–	1	–	0
Lehigh		–		8	–	1	–	0
Pittsburgh		–		8	–	1	–	0
Cornell		–		8	–	2	–	0
Yale		–		7	–	2	–	0
Franklin & Marshall		–		6	–	2	–	1
Colgate		–		5	–	2	–	1
Princeton		–		5	–	2	–	1
Brown		–		5	–	2	–	2
Fordham		–		6	–	3	–	1
Geneva		–		5	–	3	–	0
Tufts		–		5	–	3	–	0
Penn State		–		5	–	3	–	1
Rutgers		–		5	–	3	–	1
Lafayette		–		5	–	3	–	2
Syracuse		–		5	–	3	–	2
Boston College		–		5	–	4	–	0
NYU		–		5	–	4	–	0
Villanova		–		4	–	3	–	1
Bucknell		–		4	–	4	–	1
Carnegie Tech		–		4	–	4	–	0
Penn		–		4	–	4	–	1
Temple		–		3	–	3	–	0
Rhode Island State		–		2	–	3	–	3
Carlisle		–		5	–	10	–	1
Holy Cross		–		2	–	5	–	1
Vermont		–		2	–	6	–	1
New Hampshire		–		1	–	6	–	2
Duquesne		–		1	–	5	–	0

The 1914 New Hampshire football team (Note: The school did not adopt the Wildcats nickname until February 1926; before then, they were generally referred to as "the blue and white".) was an American football team that represented New Hampshire College of Agriculture and the Mechanic Arts (Note: The school was often referred to as New Hampshire College or New Hampshire State College in newspapers of the era.) during the 1914 college football season—the school became the University of New Hampshire in 1923.

Under first-year head coach Thomas D. Shepherd, a former player for Maine, the team finished with a record of 1–6–2. The team was limited to five points for the season, scoring only one safety and one field goal (via drop kick). The team was shutout seven times, although two of those games were scoreless ties.

== Schedule ==
During this era, teams played in the one-platoon system. Scoring values were consistent with the present day: six points for a touchdown, one point for a conversion kick (extra point), and three points for a field goal. (Note: For additional detail, see Early history of American football#Scoring table.)

Date	Opponent	Site	Result	Attendance	Source
September 28	at Tufts	Medford, MA	L 0–83		
October 3	at Colby	Seaverns Field; Waterville, ME	L 0–66		
October 6	Fort McKinley	Durham, NH	T 0–0		
October 10	Worcester Tech	Durham, NH	W 2–0		
October 17	at Bates	Garcelon Field; Lewiston, ME	L 0–26		
October 24	Boston College	Durham, NH	L 3–20		
October 31	at Rhode Island State	Kingston, RI	L 0–7		
November 7	at Vermont	Centennial Field; Burlington, VT	L 0–20		
November 14	Rhode Island State	Textile Field; Manchester, NH	T 0–0		

== Team ==
Player	Class	Position
Walter F. Parker	1915	Right end
Harold F. Swett (Note: Surname erroneously listed as Sweet in the season summary.)	1916, 2-Year	Right tackle
Paul E. Corriveau	1915	Right guard
Armand L. Murdock	1915	Center
Ernest L. Bell	1918	Left guard
Joseph W. Morrill	1918	Left guard
Rodney S. Jenkins	1918	Left tackle
Kyle C. Westover	1917	Left end
Ralph D. Brackett	1918	Quarterback
James F. Hobbs	1915	Right halfback
Charles W. Davis	1915	Right halfback
Gardner W. Hazen (Note: Listed as A. N. Hazen in the season summary, which appears to be erroneous.)	1915, 2-Year	Fullback
Charles B. Broderick	1918	Left halfback
Hilbert G. Hewey	1918	Left halfback

Manager: William S. Bartlett, class of 1915

Each of the above players, and the student manager, appeared in a list of varsity letter winners in the school's 1916 yearbook.
