= 1914 Lafayette football team =

American football club

1914 Lafayette football
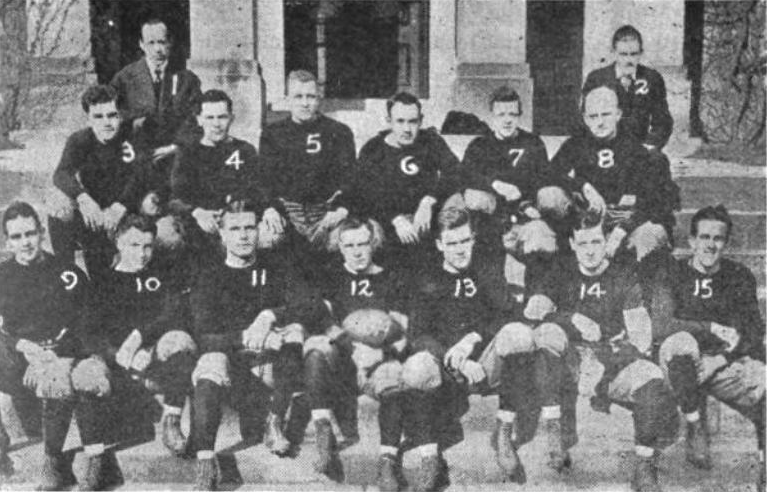
- Conference: Independent
- Record: 5–3–2
- Head coach: Wilmer G. Crowell (1st season)
- Captain: Joseph Diamond
- Home stadium: March Field

1914 Eastern college football independents records
	Conf.			Overall
Team	W	L	T	W		L		T
Army		–		9	–	0	–	0
Harvard		–		7	–	0	–	2
Washington & Jefferson		–		10	–	1	–	0
Dartmouth		–		8	–	1	–	0
Lehigh		–		8	–	1	–	0
Pittsburgh		–		8	–	1	–	0
Cornell		–		8	–	2	–	0
Yale		–		7	–	2	–	0
Franklin & Marshall		–		6	–	2	–	1
Colgate		–		5	–	2	–	1
Princeton		–		5	–	2	–	1
Brown		–		5	–	2	–	2
Fordham		–		6	–	3	–	1
Geneva		–		5	–	3	–	0
Tufts		–		5	–	3	–	0
Penn State		–		5	–	3	–	1
Rutgers		–		5	–	3	–	1
Lafayette		–		5	–	3	–	2
Syracuse		–		5	–	3	–	2
Boston College		–		5	–	4	–	0
NYU		–		5	–	4	–	0
Villanova		–		4	–	3	–	1
Bucknell		–		4	–	4	–	1
Carnegie Tech		–		4	–	4	–	0
Penn		–		4	–	4	–	1
Temple		–		3	–	3	–	0
Rhode Island State		–		2	–	3	–	3
Carlisle		–		5	–	10	–	1
Holy Cross		–		2	–	5	–	1
Vermont		–		2	–	6	–	1
New Hampshire		–		1	–	6	–	2
Duquesne		–		1	–	5	–	0

The 1914 Lafayette football team was an American football team that represented Lafayette College as an independent during the 1914 college football season. In its first season under head coach Wilmer G. Crowell, the team compiled an 5–3–2 record. Joseph Diamond was the team captain. The team played its home games at March Field in Easton, Pennsylvania.

== Schedule ==
Date	Opponent	Site	Result	Source
September 26	Delaware	March Field; Easton, PA	W 41–0	
October 3	Ursinus	March Field; Easton, PA	T 7–7	
October 10	at Penn	Franklin Field; Philadelphia, PA	T 0–0	
October 17	at Princeton	Palmer Stadium; Princeton, NJ	L 0–16	
October 24	Villanova	March Field; Easton, PA	W 14–3	
October 31	Penn State	March Field; Easton, PA	L 0–17	
November 7	Muhlenberg	March Field; Easton, PA	W 24–3	
November 14	Albright	March Field; Easton, PA	W 42–6	
November 21	Lehigh	March Field; Easton, PA (rivalry)	L 7–17	
November 26	Dickinson	March Field; Easton, PA	W 56–7	
