= 1914 Boston College football team =

American college football season

1914 Boston College football
- Conference: Independent
- Record: 5–4
- Head coach: Stephen Mahoney (1st season)
- Captains: Harry Kiley; Jim Linehan
- Home stadium: Fenway Park, South End Grounds

1914 Eastern college football independents records
| | Conf. | | | Overall |
| Team | W | L | T | W | | L | | T |
|---|---|---|---|---|---|---|---|---|
| Army | | – | | 9 | – | 0 | – | 0 |
| Harvard | | – | | 7 | – | 0 | – | 2 |
| Washington & Jefferson | | – | | 10 | – | 1 | – | 0 |
| Dartmouth | | – | | 8 | – | 1 | – | 0 |
| Lehigh | | – | | 8 | – | 1 | – | 0 |
| Pittsburgh | | – | | 8 | – | 1 | – | 0 |
| Cornell | | – | | 8 | – | 2 | – | 0 |
| Yale | | – | | 7 | – | 2 | – | 0 |
| Franklin & Marshall | | – | | 6 | – | 2 | – | 1 |
| Colgate | | – | | 5 | – | 2 | – | 1 |
| Princeton | | – | | 5 | – | 2 | – | 1 |
| Brown | | – | | 5 | – | 2 | – | 2 |
| Fordham | | – | | 6 | – | 3 | – | 1 |
| Geneva | | – | | 5 | – | 3 | – | 0 |
| Tufts | | – | | 5 | – | 3 | – | 0 |
| Penn State | | – | | 5 | – | 3 | – | 1 |
| Rutgers | | – | | 5 | – | 3 | – | 1 |
| Lafayette | | – | | 5 | – | 3 | – | 2 |
| Syracuse | | – | | 5 | – | 3 | – | 2 |
| Boston College | | – | | 5 | – | 4 | – | 0 |
| NYU | | – | | 5 | – | 4 | – | 0 |
| Villanova | | – | | 4 | – | 3 | – | 1 |
| Bucknell | | – | | 4 | – | 4 | – | 1 |
| Carnegie Tech | | – | | 4 | – | 4 | – | 0 |
| Penn | | – | | 4 | – | 4 | – | 1 |
| Temple | | – | | 3 | – | 3 | – | 0 |
| Rhode Island State | | – | | 2 | – | 3 | – | 3 |
| Carlisle | | – | | 5 | – | 10 | – | 1 |
| Holy Cross | | – | | 2 | – | 5 | – | 1 |
| Vermont | | – | | 2 | – | 6 | – | 1 |
| New Hampshire | | – | | 1 | – | 6 | – | 2 |
| Duquesne | | – | | 1 | – | 5 | – | 0 |

The 1914 Boston College football team was an American football team that represented Boston College as an independent during the 1914 college football season. Led by first-year head coach Stephen Mahoney, Boston College compiled a record of 5–4.

== Schedule ==
| Date | Opponent | Site | Result | Source |
|---|---|---|---|---|
| October 3 | at Maine | Orono, ME | L 6–27 | |
| October 10 | at Rhode Island State | Kingston, RI | W 21–0 | |
| October 17 | at Bowdoin | Whittier Field; Brunswick, ME | L 0–20 | |
| October 24 | at New Hampshire | Durham, NH | W 20–3 | |
| October 31 | Norwich | Fenway Park; Boston, MA | W 28–6 | |
| November 7 | Saint Anselm | South End Grounds; Boston, MA | W 27–0 | |
| November 14 | at Holy Cross | Fitton Field; Worcester, MA (rivalry) | L 0–10 | |
| November 21 | at Fordham | Fordham Field; Bronx, NY | L 3–14 | |
| November 26 | Catholic University | Fenway Park; Boston, MA | W 14–0 | |
