= 1914 NYU Violets football team =

American college football season

1914 NYU Violets football
- Conference: Independent
- Record: 5–4
- Head coach: Thomas T. Reilley (1st season)
- Home stadium: Ohio Field

1914 Eastern college football independents records
	Conf.			Overall
Team	W	L	T	W		L		T
Army		–		9	–	0	–	0
Harvard		–		7	–	0	–	2
Washington & Jefferson		–		10	–	1	–	0
Dartmouth		–		8	–	1	–	0
Lehigh		–		8	–	1	–	0
Pittsburgh		–		8	–	1	–	0
Cornell		–		8	–	2	–	0
Yale		–		7	–	2	–	0
Franklin & Marshall		–		6	–	2	–	1
Colgate		–		5	–	2	–	1
Princeton		–		5	–	2	–	1
Brown		–		5	–	2	–	2
Fordham		–		6	–	3	–	1
Geneva		–		5	–	3	–	0
Tufts		–		5	–	3	–	0
Penn State		–		5	–	3	–	1
Rutgers		–		5	–	3	–	1
Lafayette		–		5	–	3	–	2
Syracuse		–		5	–	3	–	2
Boston College		–		5	–	4	–	0
NYU		–		5	–	4	–	0
Villanova		–		4	–	3	–	1
Bucknell		–		4	–	4	–	1
Carnegie Tech		–		4	–	4	–	0
Penn		–		4	–	4	–	1
Temple		–		3	–	3	–	0
Rhode Island State		–		2	–	3	–	3
Carlisle		–		5	–	10	–	1
Holy Cross		–		2	–	5	–	1
Vermont		–		2	–	6	–	1
New Hampshire		–		1	–	6	–	2
Duquesne		–		1	–	5	–	0

The 1914 NYU Violets football team was an American football team that represented New York University as an independent during the 1914 college football season. In their first year under head coach Thomas T. Reilley, the team compiled a 5–4 record.

== Schedule ==
Date	Opponent	Site	Result	Source
October 3	St. Stephen's	Ohio Field; Bronx, NY	W 17–0	
October 10	at Hamilton	Clinton, NY	W 26–0	
October 17	Haverford	Ohio Field; Bronx, NY	W 13–7	
October 24	RPI	Ohio Field; Bronx, NY	W 17–6	
November 3	Trinity (CT)	Ohio Field; Bronx, NY	L 3–19	
November 7	at Union (NY)	Schenectady, NY	L 0–9	
November 14	at Stevens	Castle Field; Hoboken, NJ	W 31–0	
November 21	Wesleyan	Ohio Field; Bronx, NY	L 13–29	
November 26	Rutgers	Ohio Field; Bronx, NY	L 0–33	
