= 1914 Lehigh Brown and White football team =

American college football season

1914 Lehigh Brown and White football
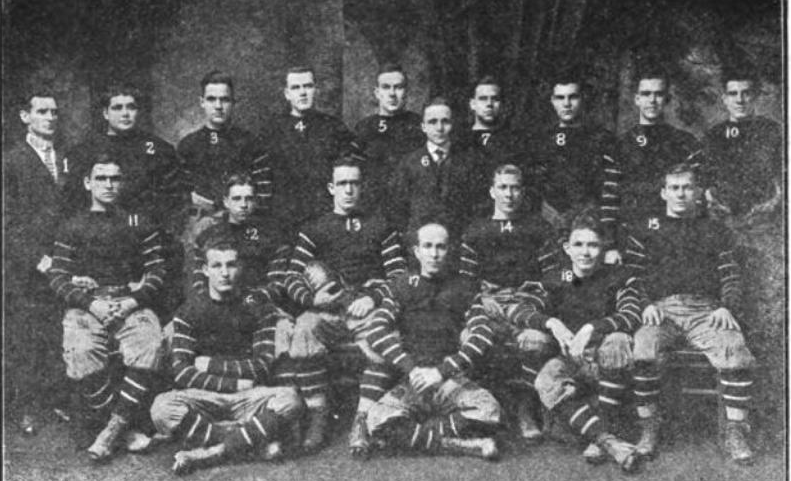
- Conference: Independent
- Record: 8–1
- Head coach: Tom Keady (3rd season)
- Captain: George Hoban
- Home stadium: Taylor Stadium

1914 Eastern college football independents records
	Conf.			Overall
Team	W	L	T	W		L		T
Army		–		9	–	0	–	0
Harvard		–		7	–	0	–	2
Washington & Jefferson		–		10	–	1	–	0
Dartmouth		–		8	–	1	–	0
Lehigh		–		8	–	1	–	0
Pittsburgh		–		8	–	1	–	0
Cornell		–		8	–	2	–	0
Yale		–		7	–	2	–	0
Franklin & Marshall		–		6	–	2	–	1
Colgate		–		5	–	2	–	1
Princeton		–		5	–	2	–	1
Brown		–		5	–	2	–	2
Fordham		–		6	–	3	–	1
Geneva		–		5	–	3	–	0
Tufts		–		5	–	3	–	0
Penn State		–		5	–	3	–	1
Rutgers		–		5	–	3	–	1
Lafayette		–		5	–	3	–	2
Syracuse		–		5	–	3	–	2
Boston College		–		5	–	4	–	0
NYU		–		5	–	4	–	0
Villanova		–		4	–	3	–	1
Bucknell		–		4	–	4	–	1
Carnegie Tech		–		4	–	4	–	0
Penn		–		4	–	4	–	1
Temple		–		3	–	3	–	0
Rhode Island State		–		2	–	3	–	3
Carlisle		–		5	–	10	–	1
Holy Cross		–		2	–	5	–	1
Vermont		–		2	–	6	–	1
New Hampshire		–		1	–	6	–	2
Duquesne		–		1	–	5	–	0

The 1914 Lehigh Brown and White football team was an American football team that represented Lehigh University as an independent during the 1914 college football season. In its third season under head coach Tom Keady, the team compiled an 8–1 record and outscored opponents by a total of 167 to 60. Lehigh played home games at Taylor Stadium in South Bethlehem, Pennsylvania.

== Schedule ==
Date	Opponent	Site	Result	Attendance	Source
September 26	Franklin & Marshall	Taylor Stadium; South Bethlehem, PA	W 12–0	3,000	
October 3	Carlisle	Taylor Stadium; South Bethlehem, PA	W 21–6		
October 10	at Yale	Yale Field; New Haven, CT	L 3–20		
October 17	Carnegie Tech	Taylor Stadium; South Bethlehem, PA	W 24–20		
October 24	at Muhlenberg	Taylor Stadium; South Bethlehem, PA	W 27–0		
October 31	Johns Hopkins	Taylor Stadium; South Bethlehem, PA	W 33–0		
November 7	Penn State	Taylor Stadium; South Bethlehem, PA	W 20–7		
November 14	Villanova	Taylor Stadium; South Bethlehem, PA	W 10–0		
November 21	at Lafayette	March Field; Easton, PA (rivalry)	W 17–7		
