= 1914 Duquesne Dukes football team =

American college football season

1914 Duquesne Dukes football
- Conference: Independent
- Record: 1–5
- Head coach: Norman "Bill" Budd (2nd season)

1914 Eastern college football independents records
	Conf.			Overall
Team	W	L	T	W		L		T
Army		–		9	–	0	–	0
Harvard		–		7	–	0	–	2
Washington & Jefferson		–		10	–	1	–	0
Dartmouth		–		8	–	1	–	0
Lehigh		–		8	–	1	–	0
Pittsburgh		–		8	–	1	–	0
Cornell		–		8	–	2	–	0
Yale		–		7	–	2	–	0
Franklin & Marshall		–		6	–	2	–	1
Colgate		–		5	–	2	–	1
Princeton		–		5	–	2	–	1
Brown		–		5	–	2	–	2
Fordham		–		6	–	3	–	1
Geneva		–		5	–	3	–	0
Tufts		–		5	–	3	–	0
Penn State		–		5	–	3	–	1
Rutgers		–		5	–	3	–	1
Lafayette		–		5	–	3	–	2
Syracuse		–		5	–	3	–	2
Boston College		–		5	–	4	–	0
NYU		–		5	–	4	–	0
Villanova		–		4	–	3	–	1
Bucknell		–		4	–	4	–	1
Carnegie Tech		–		4	–	4	–	0
Penn		–		4	–	4	–	1
Temple		–		3	–	3	–	0
Rhode Island State		–		2	–	3	–	3
Carlisle		–		5	–	10	–	1
Holy Cross		–		2	–	5	–	1
Vermont		–		2	–	6	–	1
New Hampshire		–		1	–	6	–	2
Duquesne		–		1	–	5	–	0

The 1914 Duquesne Dukes football team represented Duquesne University during the 1914 college football season. The head coach was Norman "Bill" Budd, coaching his second season with the Dukes.

== Schedule ==
Date	Opponent	Site	Result	Source
October 3	Thiel	Pittsburgh, PA	W 60–0	
October 10	at Saint Francis (PA)	Loretto, PA	L 0–7	
October 17	at West Virginia	Morgantown, WV	L 0–37	
October 24	at Marietta	Marietta, OH	L 7–26	
November 3	at Geneva	Beaver Falls, PA	L 0–23	
November 14	at Allegheny	Meadville, PA	L 3–41	
