= 1914 Princeton Tigers football team =

American college football season

1914 Princeton Tigers football
- Conference: Independent
- Record: 5–2–1
- Head coach: Wilder Penfield (1st season)
- Home stadium: Palmer Stadium

1914 Eastern college football independents records
| | Conf. | | | Overall |
| Team | W | L | T | W | | L | | T |
|---|---|---|---|---|---|---|---|---|
| Army | | – | | 9 | – | 0 | – | 0 |
| Harvard | | – | | 7 | – | 0 | – | 2 |
| Washington & Jefferson | | – | | 10 | – | 1 | – | 0 |
| Dartmouth | | – | | 8 | – | 1 | – | 0 |
| Lehigh | | – | | 8 | – | 1 | – | 0 |
| Pittsburgh | | – | | 8 | – | 1 | – | 0 |
| Cornell | | – | | 8 | – | 2 | – | 0 |
| Yale | | – | | 7 | – | 2 | – | 0 |
| Franklin & Marshall | | – | | 6 | – | 2 | – | 1 |
| Colgate | | – | | 5 | – | 2 | – | 1 |
| Princeton | | – | | 5 | – | 2 | – | 1 |
| Brown | | – | | 5 | – | 2 | – | 2 |
| Fordham | | – | | 6 | – | 3 | – | 1 |
| Geneva | | – | | 5 | – | 3 | – | 0 |
| Tufts | | – | | 5 | – | 3 | – | 0 |
| Penn State | | – | | 5 | – | 3 | – | 1 |
| Rutgers | | – | | 5 | – | 3 | – | 1 |
| Lafayette | | – | | 5 | – | 3 | – | 2 |
| Syracuse | | – | | 5 | – | 3 | – | 2 |
| Boston College | | – | | 5 | – | 4 | – | 0 |
| NYU | | – | | 5 | – | 4 | – | 0 |
| Villanova | | – | | 4 | – | 3 | – | 1 |
| Bucknell | | – | | 4 | – | 4 | – | 1 |
| Carnegie Tech | | – | | 4 | – | 4 | – | 0 |
| Penn | | – | | 4 | – | 4 | – | 1 |
| Temple | | – | | 3 | – | 3 | – | 0 |
| Rhode Island State | | – | | 2 | – | 3 | – | 3 |
| Carlisle | | – | | 5 | – | 10 | – | 1 |
| Holy Cross | | – | | 2 | – | 5 | – | 1 |
| Vermont | | – | | 2 | – | 6 | – | 1 |
| New Hampshire | | – | | 1 | – | 6 | – | 2 |
| Duquesne | | – | | 1 | – | 5 | – | 0 |

The 1914 Princeton Tigers football team represented Princeton University in the 1914 college football season. The team finished with a 5–2–1 record under first-year head coach Wilder Penfield. Princeton tackle Harold Ballin was selected as a consensus first-team honoree on the 1914 College Football All-America Team. This would be Penfield's only season as head coach of the Tigers; he became a neurosurgeon later in life.

== Schedule ==
| Date | Opponent | Site | Result | Source |
|---|---|---|---|---|
| September 26 | Rutgers | Palmer Stadium; Princeton, NJ (rivalry) | W 12–0 | |
| October 3 | Bucknell | Palmer Stadium; Princeton, NJ | W 10–0 | |
| October 10 | Syracuse | Palmer Stadium; Princeton, NJ | W 12–7 | |
| October 17 | Lafayette | Palmer Stadium; Princeton, NJ | W 16–0 | |
| October 24 | Dartmouth | Palmer Stadium; Princeton, NJ | W 16–12 | |
| October 31 | Williams | Palmer Stadium; Princeton, NJ | T 7–7 | |
| November 7 | at Harvard | Harvard Stadium; Boston, MA (rivalry) | L 0–20 | |
| November 14 | Yale | Palmer Stadium; Princeton, NJ (rivalry) | L 14–19 | |
