= 1914 Yale Bulldogs football team =

American college football season

1914 Yale Bulldogs football
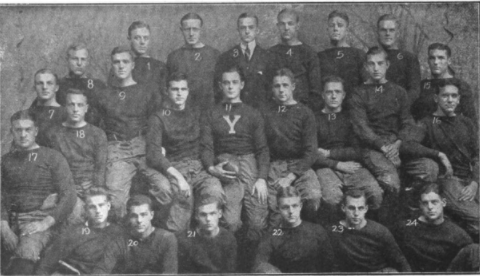
- Conference: Independent
- Record: 7–2
- Head coach: Frank Hinkey (1st season)
- Captain: Bud Talbott
- Home stadium: Yale Field; Yale Bowl

1914 Eastern college football independents records
	Conf.			Overall
Team	W	L	T	W		L		T
Army		–		9	–	0	–	0
Harvard		–		7	–	0	–	2
Washington & Jefferson		–		10	–	1	–	0
Dartmouth		–		8	–	1	–	0
Lehigh		–		8	–	1	–	0
Pittsburgh		–		8	–	1	–	0
Cornell		–		8	–	2	–	0
Yale		–		7	–	2	–	0
Franklin & Marshall		–		6	–	2	–	1
Colgate		–		5	–	2	–	1
Princeton		–		5	–	2	–	1
Brown		–		5	–	2	–	2
Fordham		–		6	–	3	–	1
Geneva		–		5	–	3	–	0
Tufts		–		5	–	3	–	0
Penn State		–		5	–	3	–	1
Rutgers		–		5	–	3	–	1
Lafayette		–		5	–	3	–	2
Syracuse		–		5	–	3	–	2
Boston College		–		5	–	4	–	0
NYU		–		5	–	4	–	0
Villanova		–		4	–	3	–	1
Bucknell		–		4	–	4	–	1
Carnegie Tech		–		4	–	4	–	0
Penn		–		4	–	4	–	1
Temple		–		3	–	3	–	0
Rhode Island State		–		2	–	3	–	3
Carlisle		–		5	–	10	–	1
Holy Cross		–		2	–	5	–	1
Vermont		–		2	–	6	–	1
New Hampshire		–		1	–	6	–	2
Duquesne		–		1	–	5	–	0

The 1914 Yale Bulldogs football team represented Yale University in the 1914 college football season. The Bulldogs finished with a 7–2 record under first-year head coach Frank Hinkey.

Fullback Harry LeGore was a consensus All-American, and tackle Bud Talbottt also received first-team All-America honors from multiple selectors.

The Yale Bowl opened on November 21; the inaugural game was against rival Harvard, a 36–0 loss with a crowd of between 68,000 and 71,000 in attendance.

== Schedule ==
Date	Opponent	Site	Result	Attendance	Source
September 26	Maine	Yale Field; New Haven, CT	W 20–0		
October 3	Virginia	Yale Field; New Haven, CT	W 21–0		
October 10	Lehigh	Yale Field; New Haven, CT	W 20–3		
October 17	Notre Dame	Yale Field; New Haven, CT	W 28–0		
October 24	Washington & Jefferson	Yale Field; New Haven, CT	L 7–13		
October 31	Colgate	Yale Field; New Haven, CT	W 49–7		
November 7	Brown	Yale Field; New Haven, CT	W 14–6		
November 14	at Princeton	Palmer Stadium; Princeton, NJ (rivalry)	W 19–14		
November 21	Harvard	Yale Bowl; New Haven, CT (rivalry)	L 0–36	71,000	

== Roster ==
- Forester F. Ainsworth
- Carleton W. Betts
- Maurice R. Brann
- Lyon Carter
- John I. Conroy
- Thomas H. Cornell
- William Easton
- James Gould
- Otis Guernsey
- Edward W. Hubbard
- Carroll W. Knowles
- Harry LeGore, FB
- Paul Loughridge
- Charles T. Neal
- Frederick W. Oakes
- Richard M. Scovil
- Charles M. Sheldon
- James R. Sheldon
- Joseph F. Stillman
- Bud Talbott, T
- Herman V. von Holt
- Franklyn E. Waite
- James P. Walden
- Carl B. White
- Alexander D. Wilson
