= 1914 Army Cadets football team =

American college football season

1914 Army Cadets football
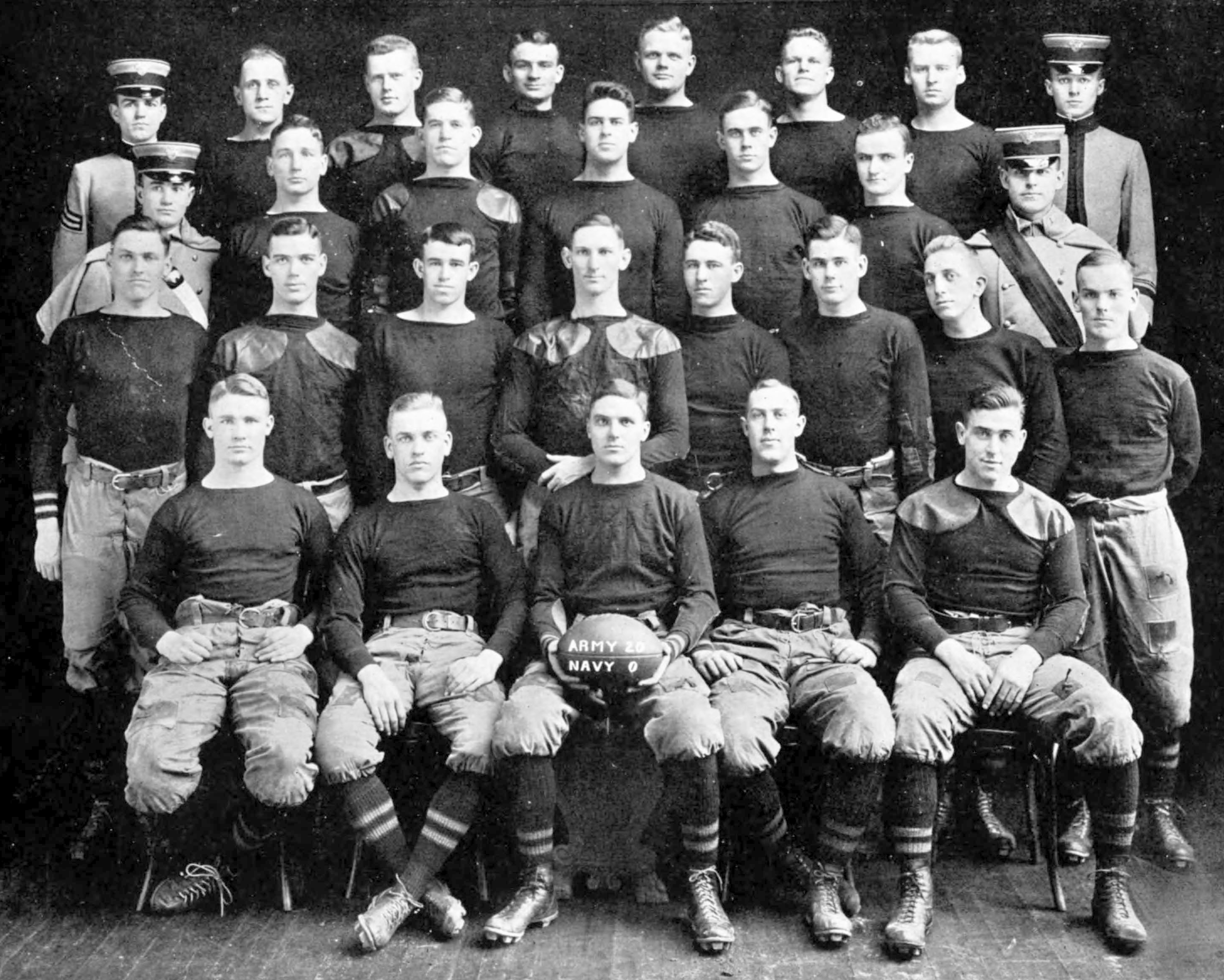

National champion (Helms, Houlgate, NCF) Co-national champion (Davis)
- Conference: Independent
- Record: 9–0
- Head coach: Charles Dudley Daly (2nd season)
- Captain: Vernon Prichard
- Home stadium: The Plain

1914 Eastern college football independents records
	Conf.			Overall
Team	W	L	T	W		L		T
Army		–		9	–	0	–	0
Harvard		–		7	–	0	–	2
Washington & Jefferson		–		10	–	1	–	0
Dartmouth		–		8	–	1	–	0
Lehigh		–		8	–	1	–	0
Pittsburgh		–		8	–	1	–	0
Cornell		–		8	–	2	–	0
Yale		–		7	–	2	–	0
Franklin & Marshall		–		6	–	2	–	1
Colgate		–		5	–	2	–	1
Princeton		–		5	–	2	–	1
Brown		–		5	–	2	–	2
Fordham		–		6	–	3	–	1
Geneva		–		5	–	3	–	0
Tufts		–		5	–	3	–	0
Penn State		–		5	–	3	–	1
Rutgers		–		5	–	3	–	1
Lafayette		–		5	–	3	–	2
Syracuse		–		5	–	3	–	2
Boston College		–		5	–	4	–	0
NYU		–		5	–	4	–	0
Villanova		–		4	–	3	–	1
Bucknell		–		4	–	4	–	1
Carnegie Tech		–		4	–	4	–	0
Penn		–		4	–	4	–	1
Temple		–		3	–	3	–	0
Rhode Island State		–		2	–	3	–	3
Carlisle		–		5	–	10	–	1
Holy Cross		–		2	–	5	–	1
Vermont		–		2	–	6	–	1
New Hampshire		–		1	–	6	–	2
Duquesne		–		1	–	5	–	0

The 1914 Army Cadets football team was an American football team that represented the United States Military Academy as an independent during the 1914 college football season. In their second season under head coach Charles Dudley Daly, the Cadets compiled a 9–0 record, shut out six of their nine opponents, and outscored all opponents by a combined total of 219 to 20, an average of 24.3 points scored and 2.2 points allowed. In the annual Army–Navy Game, the Cadets defeated the Midshipmen, 20 to 0. The Cadets also defeated Notre Dame 20–7.

The team was recognized as the national champion by the Helms Athletic Foundation, the Houlgate System, and the National Championship Foundation, and a co-national champion by Parke H. Davis.

Three Army players were recognized as first-team players on the All-America team: end Louis A. Merrilat; center John McEwan; and quarterback Vernon Prichard. Tackle Alex Weyand was selected as a third-team All-American by Walter Camp. Four players from the 1914 team were later inducted into the College Football Hall of Fame: McEwan; Weyand; Robert Neyland (later coach at Tennessee); and Elmer Oliphant.

== Schedule ==
Date	Opponent	Site	Result	Attendance	Source
October 3	Stevens	The Plain; West Point, NY	W 49–0		
October 10	Rutgers	The Plain; West Point, NY	W 13–0		
October 17	Colgate	The Plain; West Point, NY	W 21–7		
October 24	Holy Cross	The Plain; West Point, NY	W 14–0		
October 31	Villanova	The Plain; West Point, NY	W 41–0		
November 7	Notre Dame	The Plain; West Point, NY (rivalry)	W 20–7	6,000	
November 14	Maine	The Plain; West Point, NY	W 28–0		
November 21	Springfield YMCA	The Plain; West Point, NY	W 13–6		
November 28	vs. Navy	Franklin Field; Philadelphia, PA (Army–Navy Game)	W 20–0		

== Players ==
- Charles Benedict, fullback
- Omar Bradley (later Chairman of the Joint Chiefs of Staff Chief of Staff of the U.S. Army)
- William O. Butler, left tackle
- William Coffin, fullback
- John F. Goodman, center
- Charles Herrick, left guard
- Paul A. Hodgson, left halfback
- William M. Hoge, right halfback and fullback
- James P. Kelly, right end
- John McEwan, center (College Football Hall of Fame)
- Laurence Meacham, left guard and right guard
- Louis A. Merrilat, left end and right end
- Robert Neyland, left end (College Football Hall of Fame)
- Joseph J. O'Hare, right guard
- Elmer Oliphant, halfback (College Football Hall of Fame)
- Vernon Prichard, quarterback
- James Van Fleet, right halfback
- Alex Weyand, right tackle (College Football Hall of Fame)
