= 1914 Syracuse Orangemen football team =

American college football season

1914 Syracuse Orangemen football
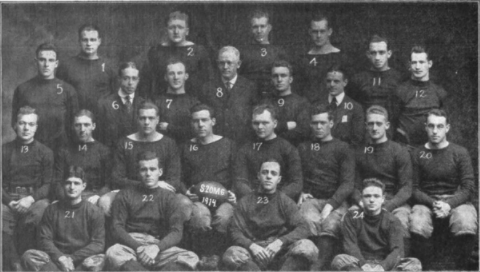
- Conference: Independent
- Record: 5–3–2
- Head coach: Frank "Buck" O'Neill (4th season)
- Captain: James Schufelt
- Home stadium: Archbold Stadium

1914 Eastern college football independents records
| | Conf. | | | Overall |
| Team | W | L | T | W | | L | | T |
|---|---|---|---|---|---|---|---|---|
| Army | | – | | 9 | – | 0 | – | 0 |
| Harvard | | – | | 7 | – | 0 | – | 2 |
| Washington & Jefferson | | – | | 10 | – | 1 | – | 0 |
| Dartmouth | | – | | 8 | – | 1 | – | 0 |
| Lehigh | | – | | 8 | – | 1 | – | 0 |
| Pittsburgh | | – | | 8 | – | 1 | – | 0 |
| Cornell | | – | | 8 | – | 2 | – | 0 |
| Yale | | – | | 7 | – | 2 | – | 0 |
| Franklin & Marshall | | – | | 6 | – | 2 | – | 1 |
| Colgate | | – | | 5 | – | 2 | – | 1 |
| Princeton | | – | | 5 | – | 2 | – | 1 |
| Brown | | – | | 5 | – | 2 | – | 2 |
| Fordham | | – | | 6 | – | 3 | – | 1 |
| Geneva | | – | | 5 | – | 3 | – | 0 |
| Tufts | | – | | 5 | – | 3 | – | 0 |
| Penn State | | – | | 5 | – | 3 | – | 1 |
| Rutgers | | – | | 5 | – | 3 | – | 1 |
| Lafayette | | – | | 5 | – | 3 | – | 2 |
| Syracuse | | – | | 5 | – | 3 | – | 2 |
| Boston College | | – | | 5 | – | 4 | – | 0 |
| NYU | | – | | 5 | – | 4 | – | 0 |
| Villanova | | – | | 4 | – | 3 | – | 1 |
| Bucknell | | – | | 4 | – | 4 | – | 1 |
| Carnegie Tech | | – | | 4 | – | 4 | – | 0 |
| Penn | | – | | 4 | – | 4 | – | 1 |
| Temple | | – | | 3 | – | 3 | – | 0 |
| Rhode Island State | | – | | 2 | – | 3 | – | 3 |
| Carlisle | | – | | 5 | – | 10 | – | 1 |
| Holy Cross | | – | | 2 | – | 5 | – | 1 |
| Vermont | | – | | 2 | – | 6 | – | 1 |
| New Hampshire | | – | | 1 | – | 6 | – | 2 |
| Duquesne | | – | | 1 | – | 5 | – | 0 |

The 1914 Syracuse Orangemen football team represented Syracuse University as an independent during the 1914 college football season. Led by fourth-year head coach Frank "Buck" O'Neill, the Orangemen compiled a record of 5–3–2. The team played home games at Archbold Stadium in Syracuse, New York.

== Schedule ==
| Date | Opponent | Site | Result | Attendance | Source |
|---|---|---|---|---|---|
| September 26 | Hobart | Archbold Stadium; Syracuse, NY | W 37–0 | | |
| October 3 | Hamilton | Archbold Stadium; Syracuse, NY | W 81–0 | | |
| October 10 | at Princeton | University Field; Princeton, NJ | L 7–12 | | |
| October 17 | Rochester | Archbold Stadium; Syracuse, NY | W 19–0 | | |
| October 24 | Michigan | Archbold Stadium; Syracuse, NY | W 20–6 | 10,000 | |
| October 31 | vs. Carlisle | Federal League Park; Buffalo, NY | W 24–3 | 9,000 | |
| November 7 | Rutgers | Archbold Stadium; Syracuse, NY | T 14–14 | | |
| November 14 | Colgate | Archbold Stadium; Syracuse, NY (rivalry) | T 0–0 | 17,000 | |
| November 21 | vs. Dartmouth | Fenway Park; Boston, MA | L 0–40 | | |
| November 26 | Notre Dame | Archbold Stadium; Syracuse, NY | L 0–20 | | |
