= Paul A. Hodgson =

United States Army officer

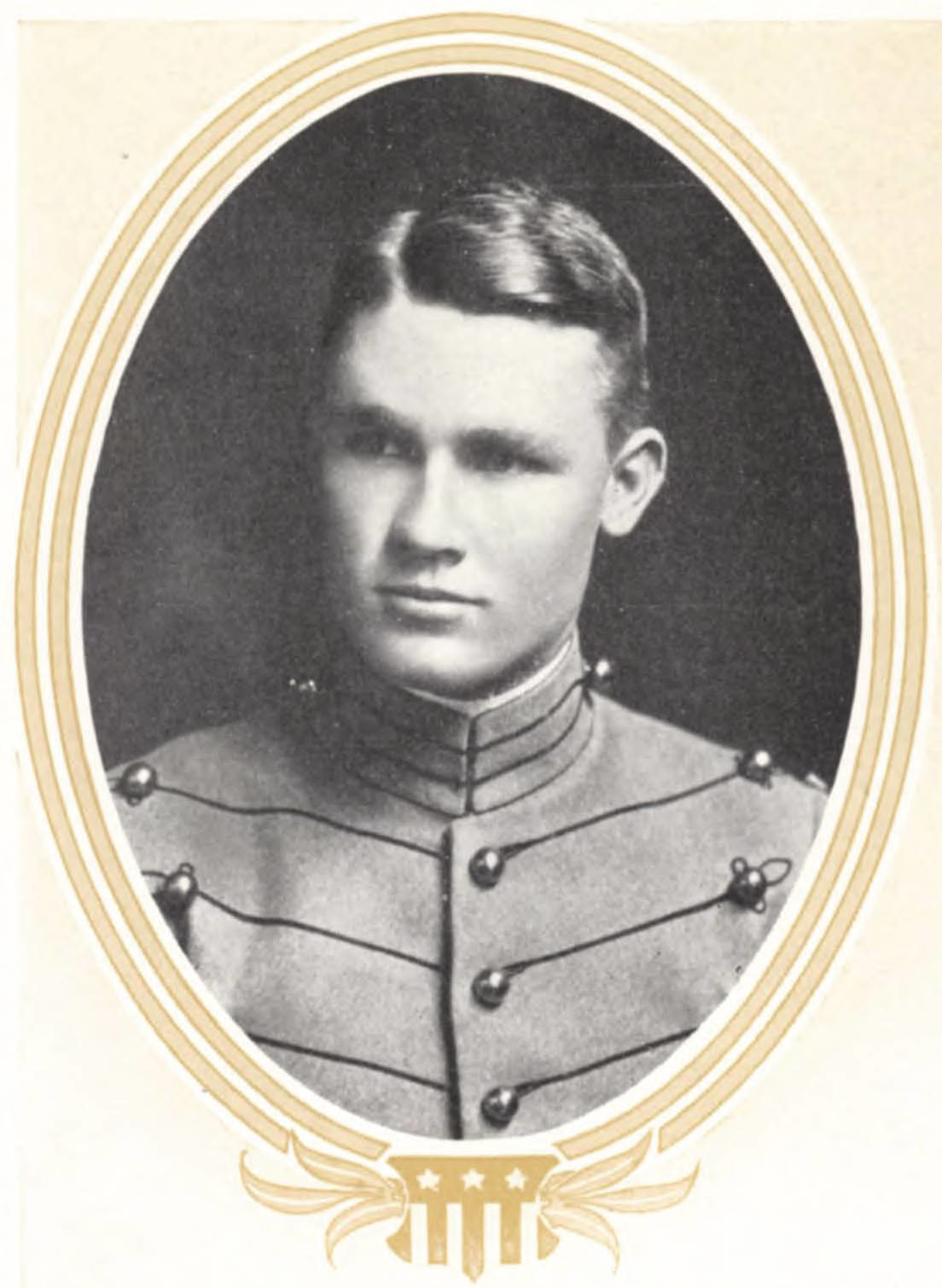
- Paul A. Hodgson as a West Point cadet
- Born: November 19, 1891; Latham, Kansas, U.S.
- Died: October 7, 1955 (aged 63); San Francisco, California, U.S.
- Military career
- Allegiance: United States of America
- Branch: United States Army
- Rank: Colonel
- Conflicts: World War I World War II
- Awards: Legion of Merit

Paul Alfred Hodgson (November 19, 1891 – October 7, 1955) was a West Point graduate who served in the World War I and World War II. While at West Point, he roomed with the future President of the United States, Dwight D. Eisenhower. The two enjoyed a lifelong friendship throughout their military career and their enjoyment for sports.

== Military ==
Hodgson was born in Latham, Kansas. In 1911, he received the appointment to West Point Military Academy from the eighth Congressional district of Kansas. Throughout his four years at West Point, he distinguished himself in academics and graduated eighteenth in the 164-member class of 1915 ("the class the stars fell on").

Hodgson got involved in sports early on at West Point, making the varsity football team his freshman year. He became an athlete and a star football player on the first undefeated Army team of 1914. He also participated in the varsity baseball and basketball teams and broke the then-existing Academy records for the high jump and broad jump. Injuries, however, kept both him and his roommate, Dwight D. Eisenhower, from achieving greater fame in athletics.

Following West Point, Hodgson attended Army Engineer school in Washington, D.C.. In World War I he joined the 11th Division with the 211th Engineers but not soon enough to travel overseas. Tours on the West Coast and Washington, D. C. followed by graduation from the Command and General Staff School at Fort Leavenworth seemed to be preparing him for new opportunities. Illness struck him in 1941 and, after several months in Fitzsimmons General Hospital, Hodgson was discharged because of arthritis, a disease which afflicted him since his West Point days.

== Recalled to duty ==
With the outbreak of World War II, Hodgson was recalled to active duty as the Executive Officer of Fort Sam Houston, Texas, where he remained until August 1945. While at Fort Sam Houston, Hodgson was promoted to Colonel and was awarded the Legion of Merit. Following the end of his military career, Hodgson retired to California and died at the Letterman Army Hospital in San Francisco at the age of 63.

== Friendship with Eisenhower ==
While attending West Point, Hodgson and Eisenhower shared a room for almost 4 years. Upon being assigned together as roommates, Hodgson told his mother on July 30, 1911, "My room mate (tent mate, rather) is Dwight Eisenhower of Abilene, Kansas.…". While discussing Hodgson in December 1942, then General, Eisenhower stated, "The four years we spent in the same room more than a quarter of a century ago are still one of my most treasured memories." While Hodgson was talking with Eisenhower about running in the 1948 US Presidential Election, he said to Ike, "I think you’d make an excellent President, but am not sure you’d be very happy doing it". Ike eventually did run, and win the 1952 Election.

Hodgson spent his last days in the Letterman Hospital, and sent his last letter to Ike August 1955. Hodgson died on October 7, 1955. Upon hearing of his friend P.A.'s death, Eisenhower replied, "In P.A.'s passing, I have lost one of my oldest and best friends; one who always had my admiration, respect, and deep affection. I shall miss him more than I can say."

== Legacy ==
In February 1970, Hodgson's surviving brother and sister, Roy C. Hodgson and Grace M. Wright, donated approximately 200 pages of their brother's letters to the Dwight D. Eisenhower Presidential Library.
