= 1914 Dartmouth football team =

American college football season

1914 Dartmouth football
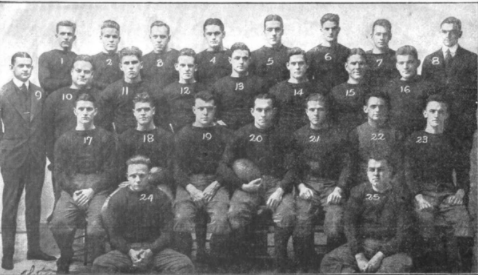
- Conference: Independent
- Record: 8–1
- Head coach: Frank Cavanaugh (4th season)
- Captain: Lawrence Whitney

1914 Eastern college football independents records
	Conf.			Overall
Team	W	L	T	W		L		T
Army		–		9	–	0	–	0
Harvard		–		7	–	0	–	2
Washington & Jefferson		–		10	–	1	–	0
Dartmouth		–		8	–	1	–	0
Lehigh		–		8	–	1	–	0
Pittsburgh		–		8	–	1	–	0
Cornell		–		8	–	2	–	0
Yale		–		7	–	2	–	0
Franklin & Marshall		–		6	–	2	–	1
Colgate		–		5	–	2	–	1
Princeton		–		5	–	2	–	1
Brown		–		5	–	2	–	2
Fordham		–		6	–	3	–	1
Geneva		–		5	–	3	–	0
Tufts		–		5	–	3	–	0
Penn State		–		5	–	3	–	1
Rutgers		–		5	–	3	–	1
Lafayette		–		5	–	3	–	2
Syracuse		–		5	–	3	–	2
Boston College		–		5	–	4	–	0
NYU		–		5	–	4	–	0
Villanova		–		4	–	3	–	1
Bucknell		–		4	–	4	–	1
Carnegie Tech		–		4	–	4	–	0
Penn		–		4	–	4	–	1
Temple		–		3	–	3	–	0
Rhode Island State		–		2	–	3	–	3
Carlisle		–		5	–	10	–	1
Holy Cross		–		2	–	5	–	1
Vermont		–		2	–	6	–	1
New Hampshire		–		1	–	6	–	2
Duquesne		–		1	–	5	–	0

The 1914 Dartmouth football team was an American football team that represented Dartmouth College as an independent during the 1914 college football season. In its fourth season under head coach Frank Cavanaugh, the team compiled an 8–1 record, shut out six of nine opponents, and outscored all opponents by a total of 359 to 25. Lawrence Whitney was the team captain.

== Schedule ==
Date	Opponent	Site	Result	Source
September 26	Massachusetts	Hanover, NH	W 29–6	
October 3	Norwich	Hanover, NH	W 74–0	
October 10	at Williams	Williamstown, MA	W 21–3	
October 17	Vermont	Hanover, NH	W 42–0	
October 24	at Princeton	Palmer Stadium; Princeton, NJ	L 12–16	
October 31	Amherst	Hanover, NH	W 32–0	
November 7	Tufts	Hanover, NH	W 68–0	
November 14	at Penn	Franklin Field; Philadelphia, PA	W 41–0	
November 21	vs. Syracuse	Fenway Park; Boston, MA	W 40–0	
