= 1914 Villanova Wildcats football team =

American college football season

1914 Villanova Wildcats football
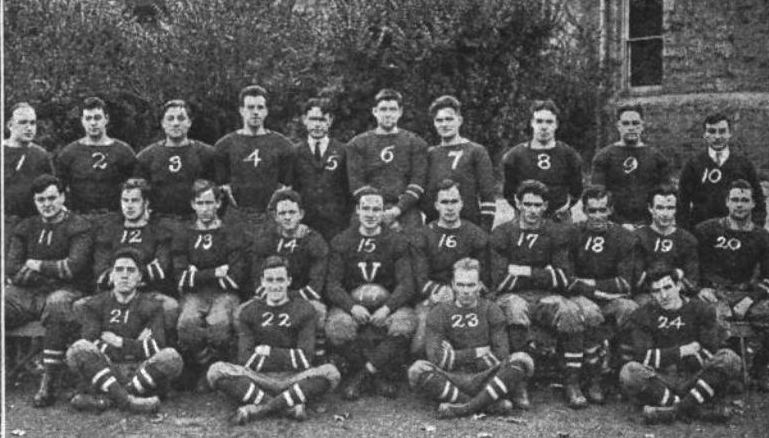
- Conference: Independent
- Record: 4–3–1
- Head coach: Dutch Sommer (1st season)
- Captain: Frank Prendergast
- Home stadium: none

1914 Eastern college football independents records
| | Conf. | | | Overall |
| Team | W | L | T | W | | L | | T |
|---|---|---|---|---|---|---|---|---|
| Army | | – | | 9 | – | 0 | – | 0 |
| Harvard | | – | | 7 | – | 0 | – | 2 |
| Washington & Jefferson | | – | | 10 | – | 1 | – | 0 |
| Dartmouth | | – | | 8 | – | 1 | – | 0 |
| Lehigh | | – | | 8 | – | 1 | – | 0 |
| Pittsburgh | | – | | 8 | – | 1 | – | 0 |
| Cornell | | – | | 8 | – | 2 | – | 0 |
| Yale | | – | | 7 | – | 2 | – | 0 |
| Franklin & Marshall | | – | | 6 | – | 2 | – | 1 |
| Colgate | | – | | 5 | – | 2 | – | 1 |
| Princeton | | – | | 5 | – | 2 | – | 1 |
| Brown | | – | | 5 | – | 2 | – | 2 |
| Fordham | | – | | 6 | – | 3 | – | 1 |
| Geneva | | – | | 5 | – | 3 | – | 0 |
| Tufts | | – | | 5 | – | 3 | – | 0 |
| Penn State | | – | | 5 | – | 3 | – | 1 |
| Rutgers | | – | | 5 | – | 3 | – | 1 |
| Lafayette | | – | | 5 | – | 3 | – | 2 |
| Syracuse | | – | | 5 | – | 3 | – | 2 |
| Boston College | | – | | 5 | – | 4 | – | 0 |
| NYU | | – | | 5 | – | 4 | – | 0 |
| Villanova | | – | | 4 | – | 3 | – | 1 |
| Bucknell | | – | | 4 | – | 4 | – | 1 |
| Carnegie Tech | | – | | 4 | – | 4 | – | 0 |
| Penn | | – | | 4 | – | 4 | – | 1 |
| Temple | | – | | 3 | – | 3 | – | 0 |
| Rhode Island State | | – | | 2 | – | 3 | – | 3 |
| Carlisle | | – | | 5 | – | 10 | – | 1 |
| Holy Cross | | – | | 2 | – | 5 | – | 1 |
| Vermont | | – | | 2 | – | 6 | – | 1 |
| New Hampshire | | – | | 1 | – | 6 | – | 2 |
| Duquesne | | – | | 1 | – | 5 | – | 0 |

The 1914 Villanova Wildcats football team represented the Villanova University during the 1914 college football season. The Wildcats team captain was Frank Prendergast.

== Schedule ==
| Date | Opponent | Site | Result | Source |
|---|---|---|---|---|
| October 3 | at Swarthmore | Swarthmore, PA | W 6–0 | |
| October 17 | at Catholic University | Washington, DC | W 7–0 | |
| October 24 | at Lafayette | March Field; Easton, PA | L 3–14 | |
| October 31 | at Army | The Plain; West Point, NY | L 0–41 | |
| November 7 | at Ursinus | Collegeville, PA | W 7–0 | |
| November 14 | at Lehigh | Taylor Stadium; Bethlehem, PA | L 0–10 | |
| November 21 | Muhlenberg | Villanova, PA | T 0–0 | |
| November 26 | at Fordham | Fordham Field; Bronx, NY | W 7–6 | |
