= 1914 Penn State Nittany Lions football team =

American college football season

1914 Penn State Nittany Lions football
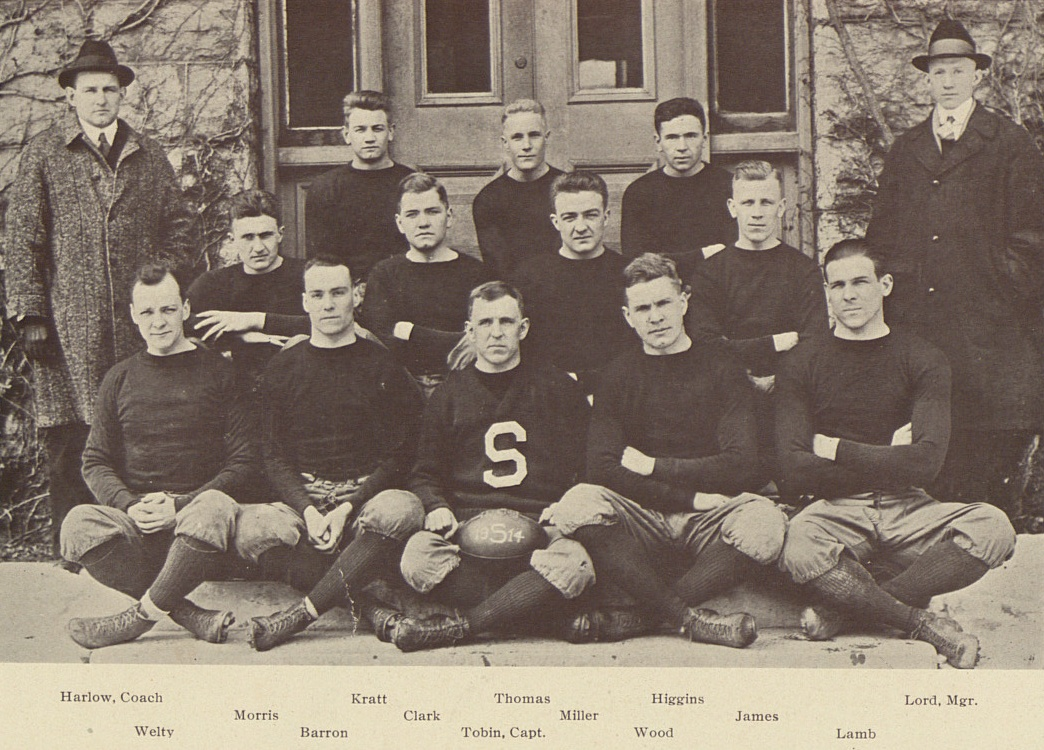
- Conference: Independent
- Record: 5–3–1
- Head coach: Bill Hollenback (5th season)
- Captain: Yegg Tobin
- Home stadium: New Beaver Field

1914 Eastern college football independents records
	Conf.			Overall
Team	W	L	T	W		L		T
Army		–		9	–	0	–	0
Harvard		–		7	–	0	–	2
Washington & Jefferson		–		10	–	1	–	0
Dartmouth		–		8	–	1	–	0
Lehigh		–		8	–	1	–	0
Pittsburgh		–		8	–	1	–	0
Cornell		–		8	–	2	–	0
Yale		–		7	–	2	–	0
Franklin & Marshall		–		6	–	2	–	1
Colgate		–		5	–	2	–	1
Princeton		–		5	–	2	–	1
Brown		–		5	–	2	–	2
Fordham		–		6	–	3	–	1
Geneva		–		5	–	3	–	0
Tufts		–		5	–	3	–	0
Penn State		–		5	–	3	–	1
Rutgers		–		5	–	3	–	1
Lafayette		–		5	–	3	–	2
Syracuse		–		5	–	3	–	2
Boston College		–		5	–	4	–	0
NYU		–		5	–	4	–	0
Villanova		–		4	–	3	–	1
Bucknell		–		4	–	4	–	1
Carnegie Tech		–		4	–	4	–	0
Penn		–		4	–	4	–	1
Temple		–		3	–	3	–	0
Rhode Island State		–		2	–	3	–	3
Carlisle		–		5	–	10	–	1
Holy Cross		–		2	–	5	–	1
Vermont		–		2	–	6	–	1
New Hampshire		–		1	–	6	–	2
Duquesne		–		1	–	5	–	0

The 1914 Penn State Nittany Lions football team represented the Pennsylvania State University as an independent during the 1914 college football season. The team was coached by Bill Hollenback and played its home games in New Beaver Field in State College, Pennsylvania.

== Schedule ==
Date	Opponent	Site	Result	Attendance	Source
September 26	Westminster (PA)	New Beaver Field; State College, PA	W 13–0		
October 3	Muhlenberg	New Beaver Field; State College, PA	W 22–0		
October 10	Gettysburg	New Beaver Field; State College, PA	W 13–0		
October 17	Ursinus	New Beaver Field; State College, PA	W 30–0		
October 24	at Harvard	Harvard Stadium; Boston, MA	T 13–13	22,000	
October 31	at Lafayette	March Field; Easton, PA	W 17–0		
November 7	at Lehigh	Taylor Stadium; Bethlehem, PA	L 7–20		
November 13	Michigan State	New Beaver Field; State College, PA (rivalry)	L 3–6	10,000	
November 26	at Pittsburgh	Forbes Field; Pittsburgh, PA (rivalry)	L 3–13	17,000	
