= 1914 Cornell Big Red football team =

American college football season

1914 Cornell Big Red football
- Conference: Independent
- Record: 8–2
- Head coach: Albert Sharpe (3rd season)
- Captain: John O'Hearn

1914 Eastern college football independents records
	Conf.			Overall
Team	W	L	T	W		L		T
Army		–		9	–	0	–	0
Harvard		–		7	–	0	–	2
Washington & Jefferson		–		10	–	1	–	0
Dartmouth		–		8	–	1	–	0
Lehigh		–		8	–	1	–	0
Pittsburgh		–		8	–	1	–	0
Cornell		–		8	–	2	–	0
Yale		–		7	–	2	–	0
Franklin & Marshall		–		6	–	2	–	1
Colgate		–		5	–	2	–	1
Princeton		–		5	–	2	–	1
Brown		–		5	–	2	–	2
Fordham		–		6	–	3	–	1
Geneva		–		5	–	3	–	0
Tufts		–		5	–	3	–	0
Penn State		–		5	–	3	–	1
Rutgers		–		5	–	3	–	1
Lafayette		–		5	–	3	–	2
Syracuse		–		5	–	3	–	2
Boston College		–		5	–	4	–	0
NYU		–		5	–	4	–	0
Villanova		–		4	–	3	–	1
Bucknell		–		4	–	4	–	1
Carnegie Tech		–		4	–	4	–	0
Penn		–		4	–	4	–	1
Temple		–		3	–	3	–	0
Rhode Island State		–		2	–	3	–	3
Carlisle		–		5	–	10	–	1
Holy Cross		–		2	–	5	–	1
Vermont		–		2	–	6	–	1
New Hampshire		–		1	–	6	–	2
Duquesne		–		1	–	5	–	0

The 1914 Cornell Big Red football team represented Cornell University in the 1914 college football season.

== Schedule ==
Date	Opponent	Site	Result	Attendance	Source
September 26	Ursinus	Ithaca, NY	W 28–0		
September 30	Pittsburgh	Ithaca, NY	L 3–9		
October 3	Colgate	Ithaca, NY (rivalry)	L 3–7		
October 10	Carlisle	Ithaca, NY	W 21–0		
October 17	Bucknell	Ithaca, NY	W 48–0		
October 24	vs. Brown	Polo Grounds; New York, NY	W 28–7		
October 31	Holy Cross	Ithaca, NY	W 48–3		
November 7	Franklin & Marshall	Ithaca, NY	W 26–3		
November 14	at Michigan	Ferry Field; Ann Arbor, MI	W 28–13	16,315	
November 26	at Penn	Franklin Field; Philadelphia, PA (rivalry)	W 24–12		

== Gallery ==
Images of the Cornell/Brown game at "Brush Stadium" (later re-named the Polo Grounds) in New York City, October 24, 1914
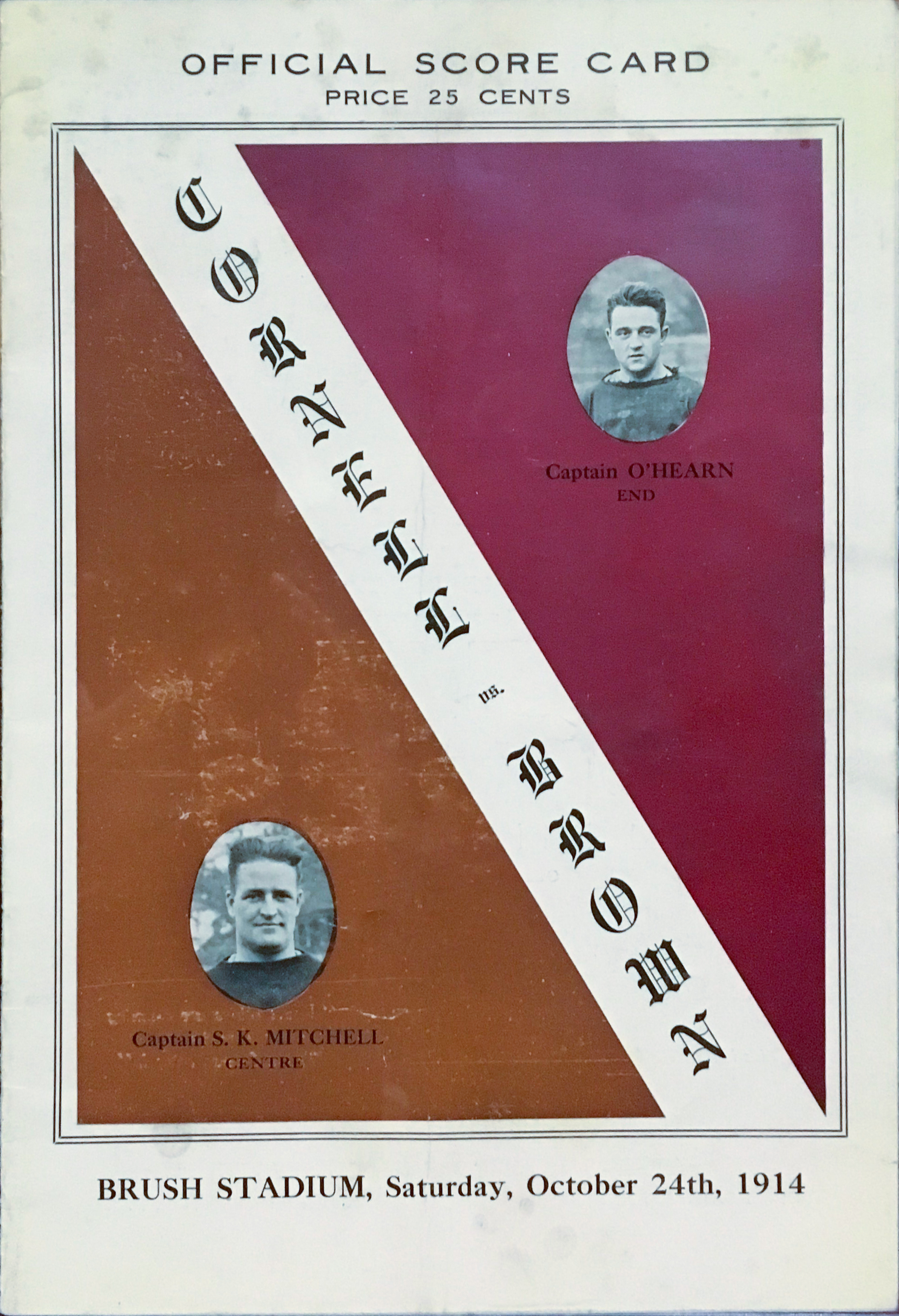
Game program

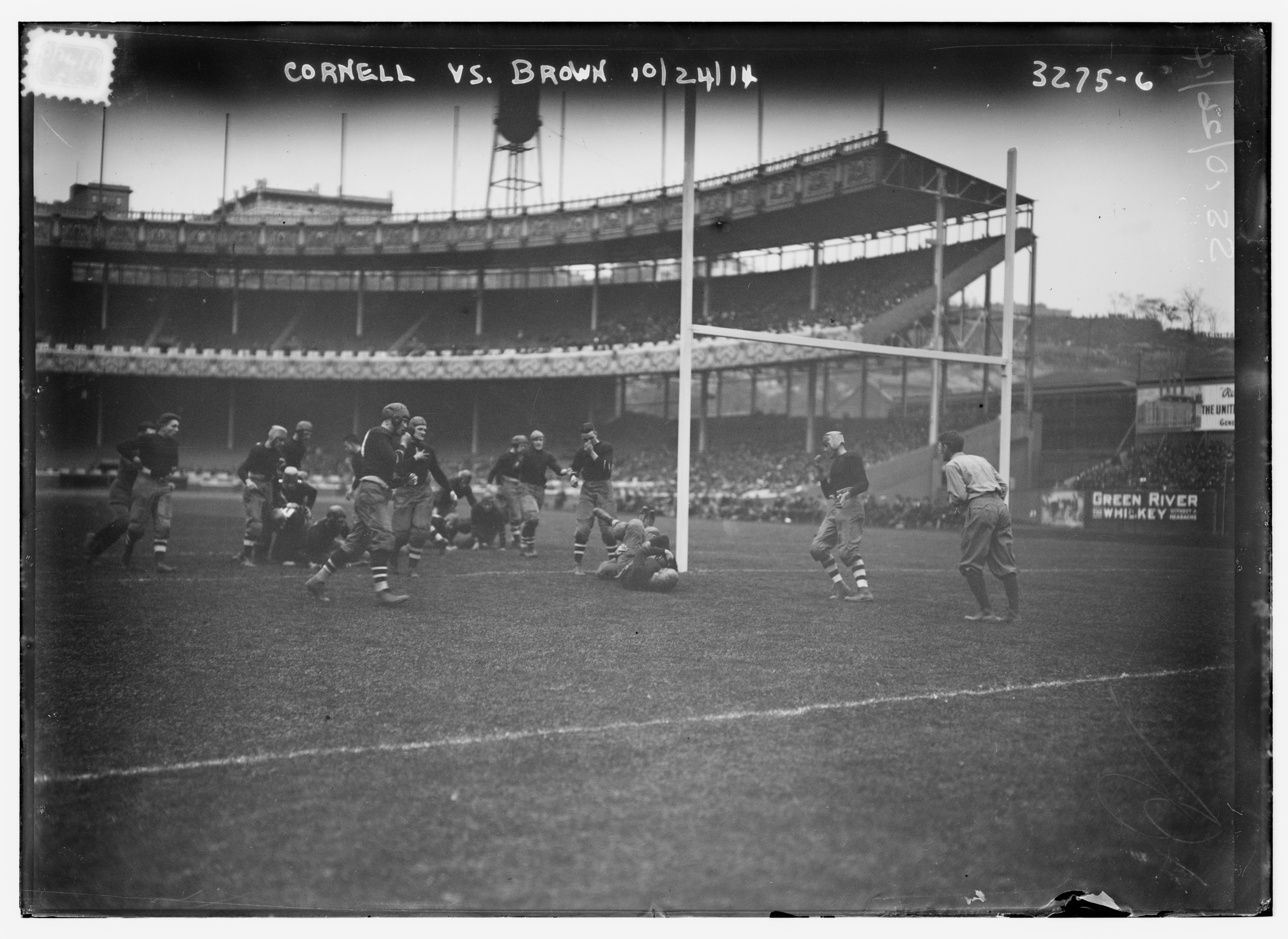
Photo from the George Grantham Bain Collection, Library of Congress

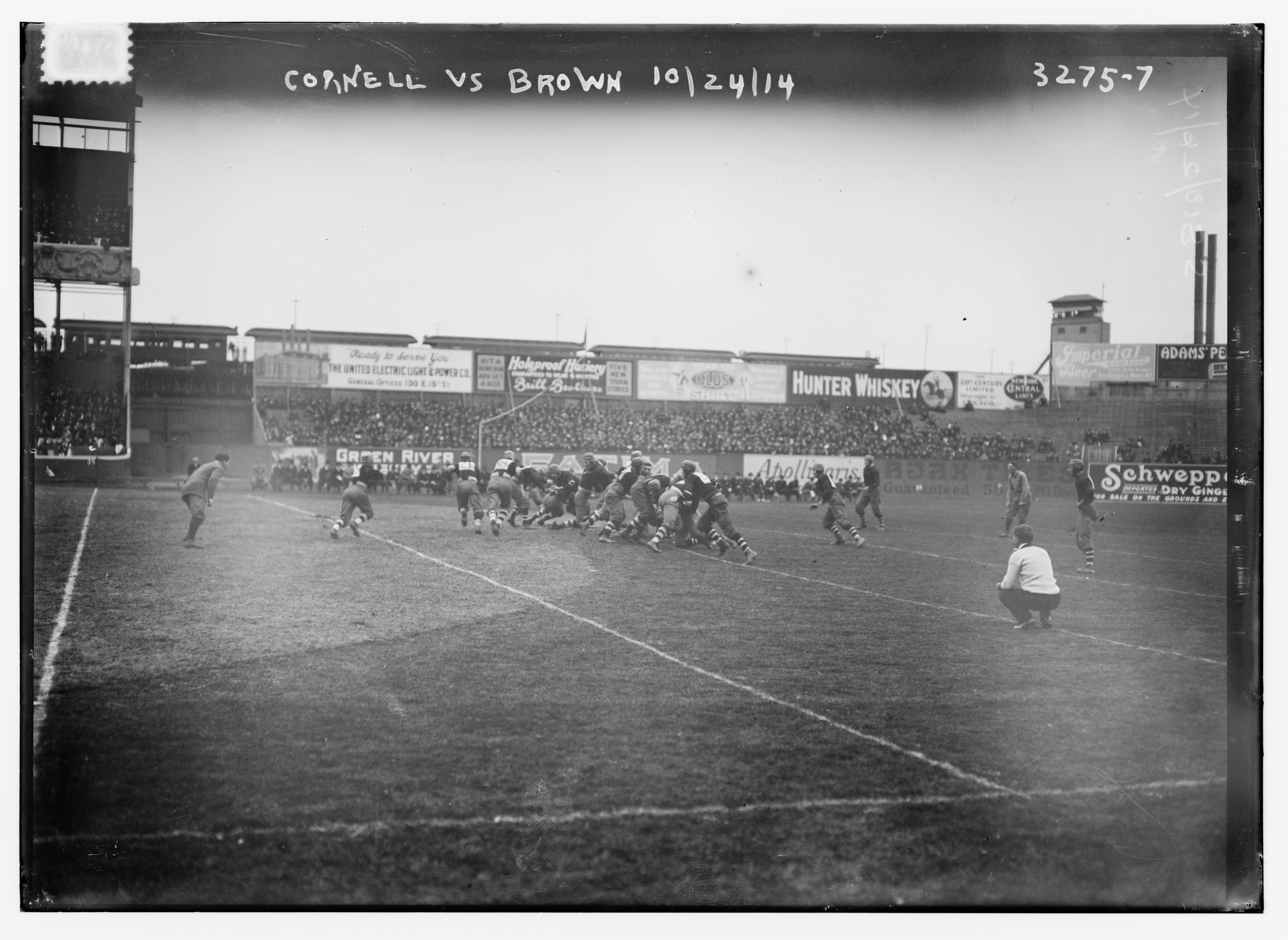
Photo from the George Grantham Bain Collection, Library of Congress
