= 1914 Rutgers Queensmen football team =

American college football season

1914 Rutgers Queensmen football
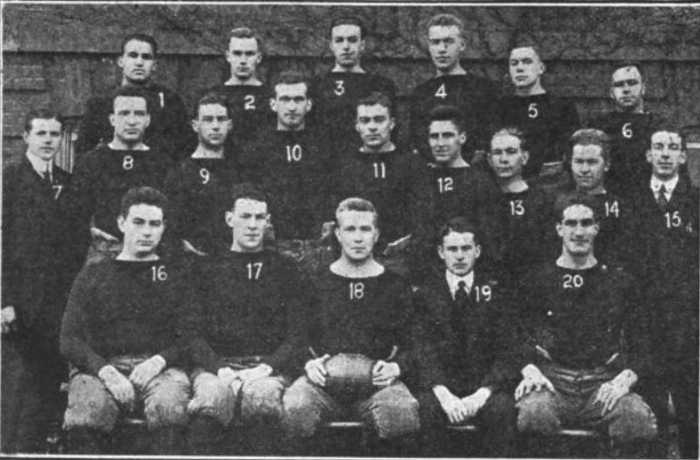
- Conference: Independent
- Record: 5–3–1
- Head coach: George Sanford (2nd season)
- Captain: John Toohey
- Home stadium: Neilson Field

1914 Eastern college football independents records
	Conf.			Overall
Team	W	L	T	W		L		T
Army		–		9	–	0	–	0
Harvard		–		7	–	0	–	2
Washington & Jefferson		–		10	–	1	–	0
Dartmouth		–		8	–	1	–	0
Lehigh		–		8	–	1	–	0
Pittsburgh		–		8	–	1	–	0
Cornell		–		8	–	2	–	0
Yale		–		7	–	2	–	0
Franklin & Marshall		–		6	–	2	–	1
Colgate		–		5	–	2	–	1
Princeton		–		5	–	2	–	1
Brown		–		5	–	2	–	2
Fordham		–		6	–	3	–	1
Geneva		–		5	–	3	–	0
Tufts		–		5	–	3	–	0
Penn State		–		5	–	3	–	1
Rutgers		–		5	–	3	–	1
Lafayette		–		5	–	3	–	2
Syracuse		–		5	–	3	–	2
Boston College		–		5	–	4	–	0
NYU		–		5	–	4	–	0
Villanova		–		4	–	3	–	1
Bucknell		–		4	–	4	–	1
Carnegie Tech		–		4	–	4	–	0
Penn		–		4	–	4	–	1
Temple		–		3	–	3	–	0
Rhode Island State		–		2	–	3	–	3
Carlisle		–		5	–	10	–	1
Holy Cross		–		2	–	5	–	1
Vermont		–		2	–	6	–	1
New Hampshire		–		1	–	6	–	2
Duquesne		–		1	–	5	–	0

The 1914 Rutgers Queensmen football team represented Rutgers University as an independent during the 1914 college football season. In their second season under head coach George Sanford, the Queensmen compiled a 5–3–1 record and outscored their opponents, 208 to 73. Sanford was inducted into the College Football Hall of Fame in 1971.

== Schedule ==
Date	Opponent	Site	Result	Attendance	Source
September 26	at Princeton	Palmer Stadium; Princeton, NJ (rivalry)	L 0–12		
October 3	RPI	Neilson Field; New Brunswick, NJ	W 32–0		
October 10	at Army	The Plain; West Point, NY	L 0–13		
October 17	Muhlenberg	Neilson Field; New Brunswick, NJ	W 17–7		
October 24	vs. Tufts	Widenmayer's Park; Newark, NJ	W 16–7	6,000	
November 7	at Syracuse	Archbold Stadium; Syracuse, NY	T 14–14		
November 21	at Stevens	Hoboken, NJ	W 83–0		
November 26	at NYU	Ohio Field; Bronx, NY	W 33–0		
November 28	vs. Washington & Jefferson	Polo Grounds; New York, NY	L 13–20		
