= 1914 Vermont Green and Gold football team =

American college football season

1914 Vermont Green and Gold football
- Conference: Independent
- Record: 2–6–1
- Head coach: James A. Turner (1st season)
- Home stadium: Centennial Field

1914 Eastern college football independents records
	Conf.			Overall
Team	W	L	T	W		L		T
Army		–		9	–	0	–	0
Harvard		–		7	–	0	–	2
Washington & Jefferson		–		10	–	1	–	0
Dartmouth		–		8	–	1	–	0
Lehigh		–		8	–	1	–	0
Pittsburgh		–		8	–	1	–	0
Cornell		–		8	–	2	–	0
Yale		–		7	–	2	–	0
Franklin & Marshall		–		6	–	2	–	1
Colgate		–		5	–	2	–	1
Princeton		–		5	–	2	–	1
Brown		–		5	–	2	–	2
Fordham		–		6	–	3	–	1
Geneva		–		5	–	3	–	0
Tufts		–		5	–	3	–	0
Penn State		–		5	–	3	–	1
Rutgers		–		5	–	3	–	1
Lafayette		–		5	–	3	–	2
Syracuse		–		5	–	3	–	2
Boston College		–		5	–	4	–	0
NYU		–		5	–	4	–	0
Villanova		–		4	–	3	–	1
Bucknell		–		4	–	4	–	1
Carnegie Tech		–		4	–	4	–	0
Penn		–		4	–	4	–	1
Temple		–		3	–	3	–	0
Rhode Island State		–		2	–	3	–	3
Carlisle		–		5	–	10	–	1
Holy Cross		–		2	–	5	–	1
Vermont		–		2	–	6	–	1
New Hampshire		–		1	–	6	–	2
Duquesne		–		1	–	5	–	0

The 1914 Vermont Green and Gold football team was an American football team that represented the University of Vermont as an independent during the 1914 college football season. In their first year under head coach James A. Turner, the team compiled a 2–6–1 record.

== Schedule ==
Date	Opponent	Site	Result	Source
October 3	at Williams	Weston Field; Williamstown, MA	L 0–3	
October 10	vs. Maine	Manchester, NH	L 0–21	
October 17	at Dartmouth	Alumni Oval; Hanover, NH	L 0–42	
October 24	at Colgate	Whitnall Field; Hamilton, NY	L 0–41	
October 31	at Brown	Andrews Field; Providence, RI	L 9–12	
November 7	New Hampshire	Centennial Field; Burlington, VT	W 20–0	
November 14	at Fordham	Fordham Field; Bronx, NY	W 7–6	
November 21	Middlebury	Centennial Field; Burlington, VT	T 0–0	
November 26	at Holy Cross	Fitton Field; Worcester, MA	L 0–7	
