= 1914 Brown Bears football team =

American college football season

1914 Brown Bears football
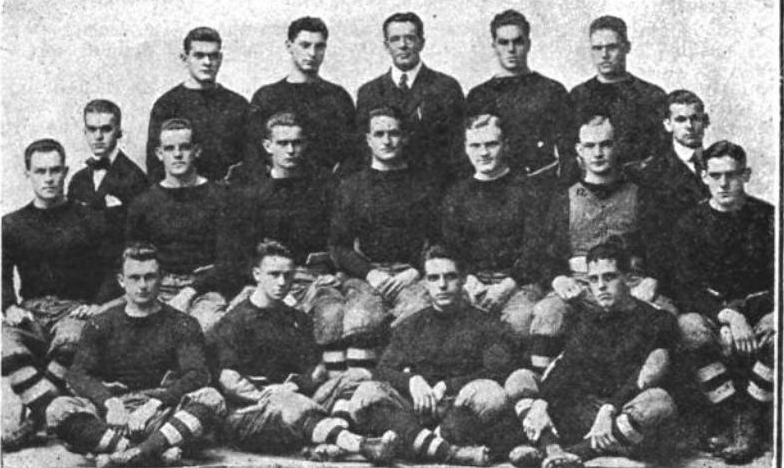
- Conference: Independent
- Record: 5–2–2
- Head coach: Edward N. Robinson (13th season)
- Captain: S. K. Mitchell
- Home stadium: Andrews Field

1914 Eastern college football independents records
	Conf.			Overall
Team	W	L	T	W		L		T
Army		–		9	–	0	–	0
Harvard		–		7	–	0	–	2
Washington & Jefferson		–		10	–	1	–	0
Dartmouth		–		8	–	1	–	0
Lehigh		–		8	–	1	–	0
Pittsburgh		–		8	–	1	–	0
Cornell		–		8	–	2	–	0
Yale		–		7	–	2	–	0
Franklin & Marshall		–		6	–	2	–	1
Colgate		–		5	–	2	–	1
Princeton		–		5	–	2	–	1
Brown		–		5	–	2	–	2
Fordham		–		6	–	3	–	1
Geneva		–		5	–	3	–	0
Tufts		–		5	–	3	–	0
Penn State		–		5	–	3	–	1
Rutgers		–		5	–	3	–	1
Lafayette		–		5	–	3	–	2
Syracuse		–		5	–	3	–	2
Boston College		–		5	–	4	–	0
NYU		–		5	–	4	–	0
Villanova		–		4	–	3	–	1
Bucknell		–		4	–	4	–	1
Carnegie Tech		–		4	–	4	–	0
Penn		–		4	–	4	–	1
Temple		–		3	–	3	–	0
Rhode Island State		–		2	–	3	–	3
Carlisle		–		5	–	10	–	1
Holy Cross		–		2	–	5	–	1
Vermont		–		2	–	6	–	1
New Hampshire		–		1	–	6	–	2
Duquesne		–		1	–	5	–	0

The 1914 Brown Bears football team was an American football team that represented Brown University as an independent during the 1914 college football season. In its 13th season under head coach Edward N. Robinson, the team compiled a 5–2–2 record and outscored opponents by a total of 105 to 65. The team played its home games at Andrews Field in Providence, Rhode Island.

== Schedule ==
Date	Opponent	Site	Result	Source
September 26	Norwich	Andrews Field; Providence, RI	W 24–0	
October 3	Rhode Island State	Andrews Field; Providence, RI (rivalry)	W 20–0	
October 10	Amherst	Andrews Field; Providence, RI	T 0–0	
October 15	Wesleyan	Andrews Field; Providence, RI	W 16–0	
October 24	vs. Cornell	Polo Grounds; New York, NY	L 7–28	
October 31	Vermont	Andrews Field; Providence, RI	W 12–9	
November 7	at Yale	Yale Field; New Haven, CT	L 6–14	
November 14	at Harvard	Harvard Stadium; Boston, MA	T 0–0	
November 26	Carlisle	Andrews Field; Providence, RI	W 20–14	

== Gallery ==
Images of the Cornell/Brown game at "Brush Stadium" (later re-named the Polo Grounds) in New York City, October 24, 1914
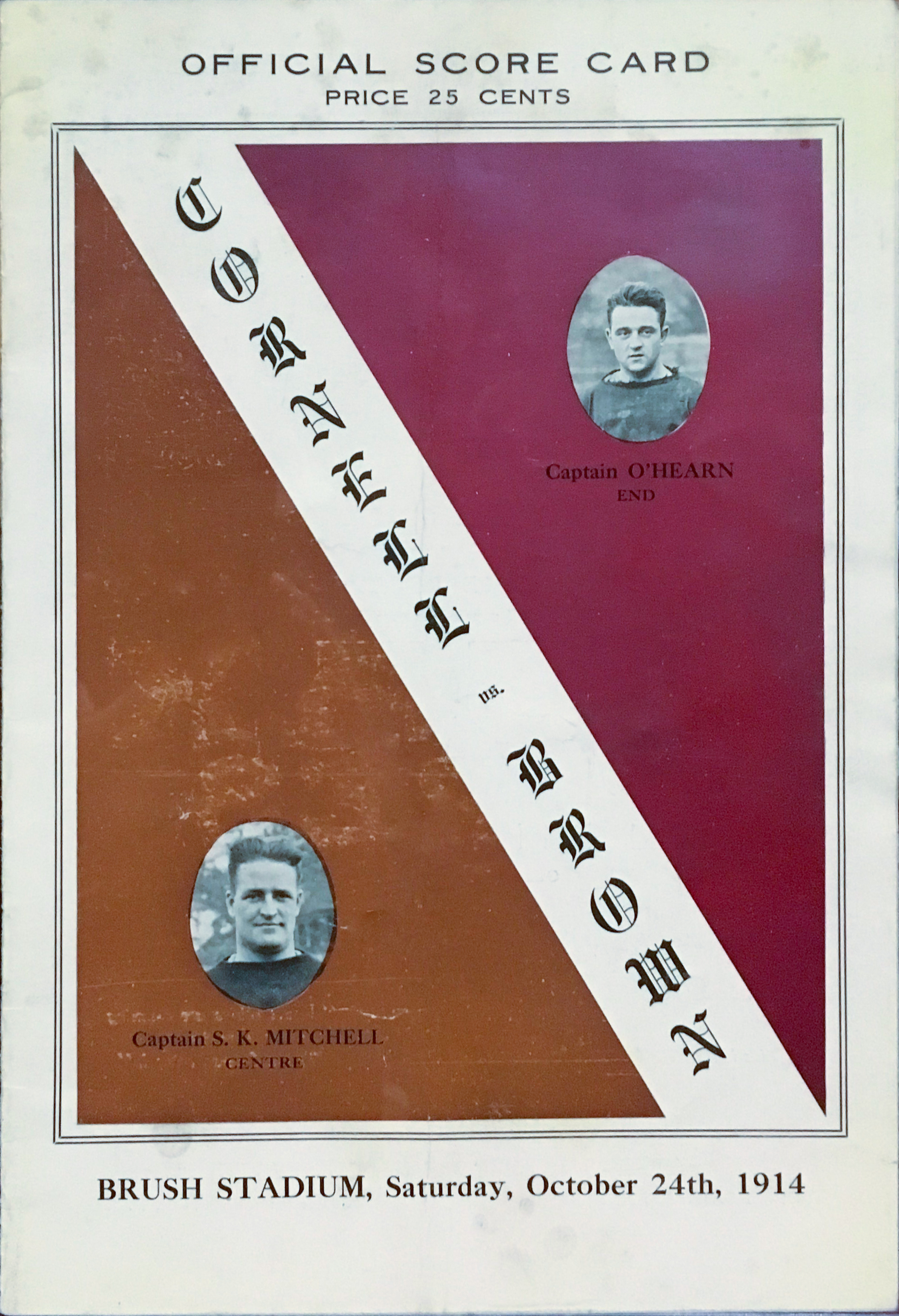
Game program

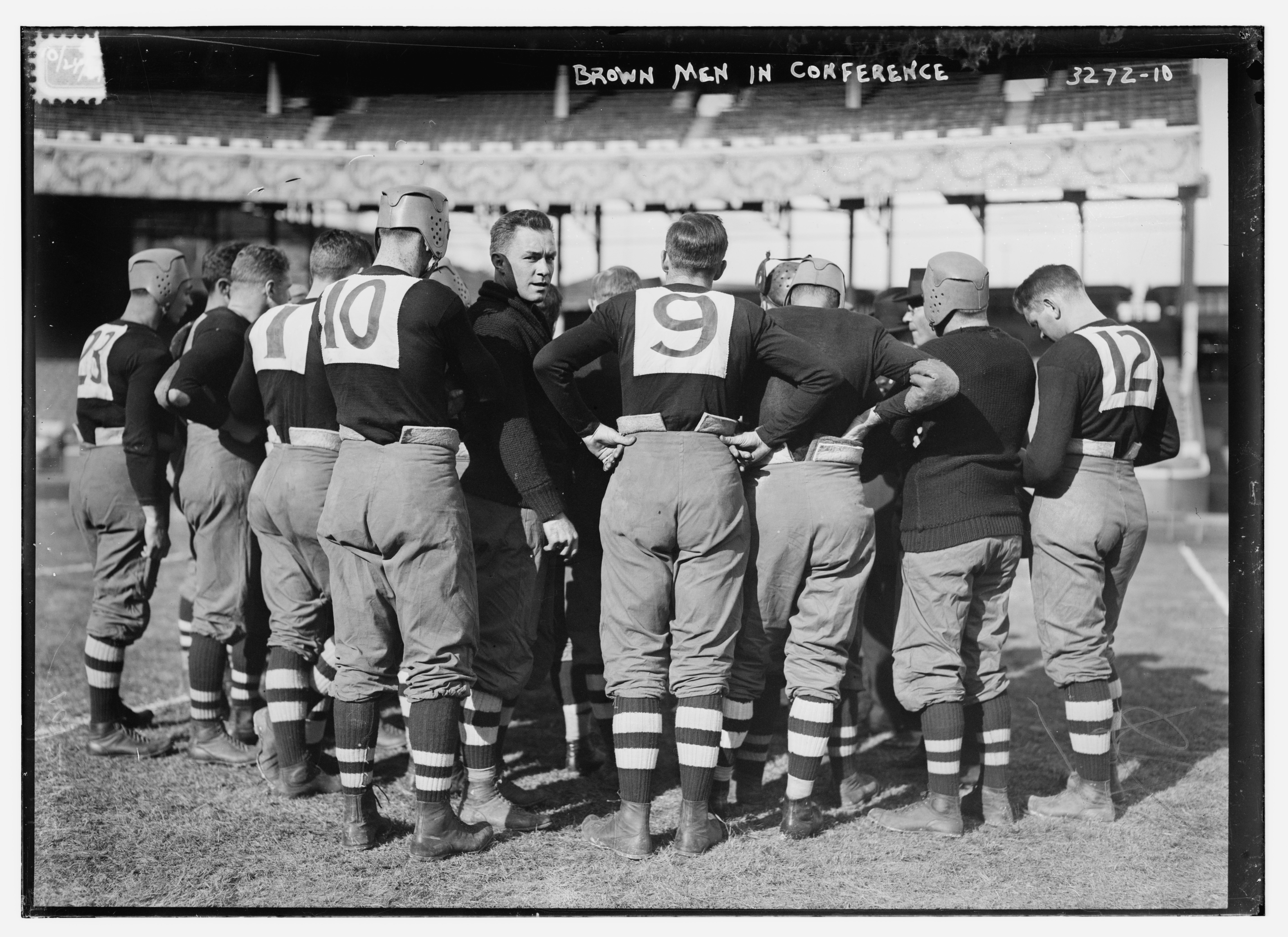
Brown players in conference. Photo from the George Grantham Bain Collection, Library of Congress

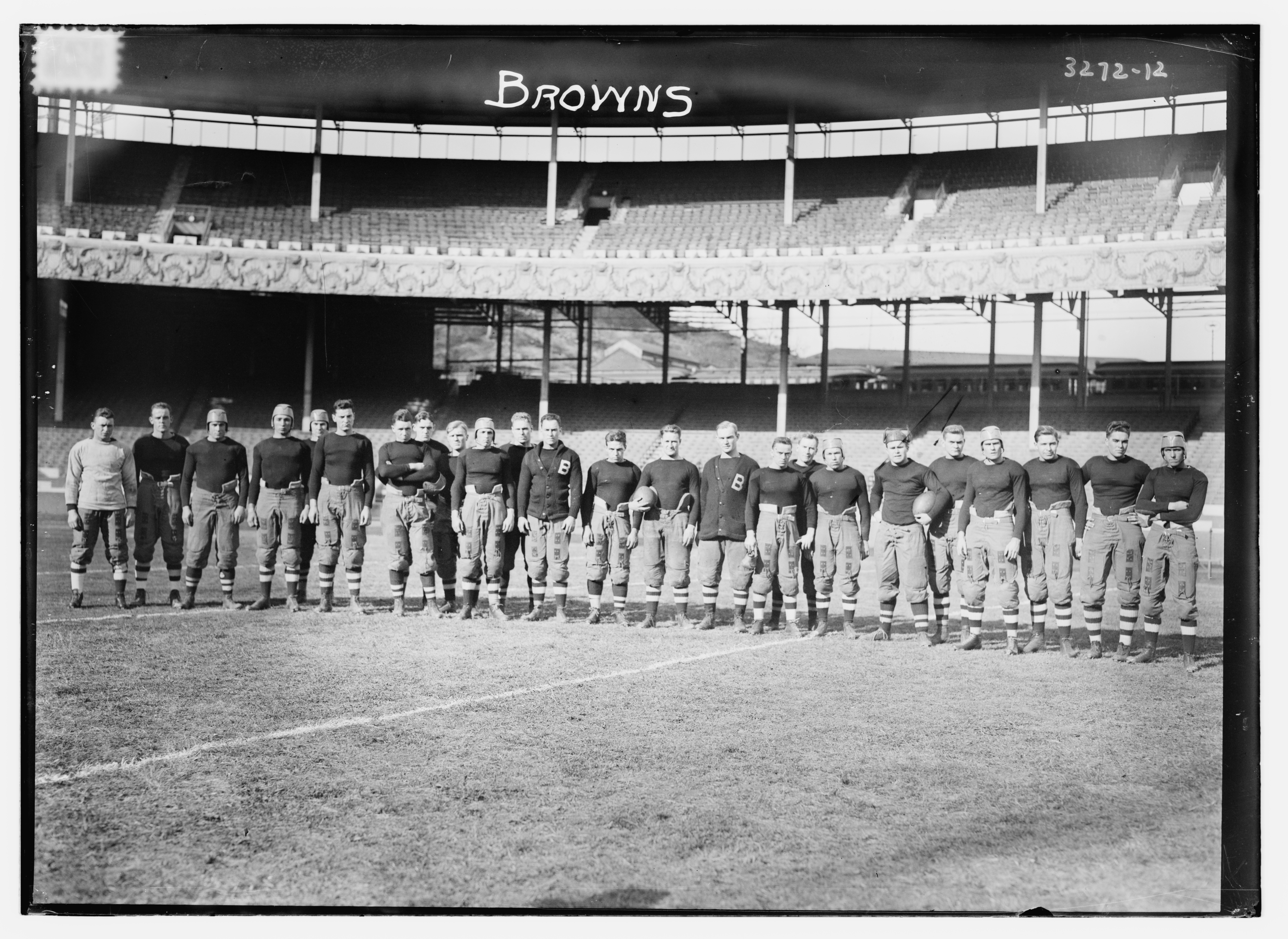
Brown's 1914 football team. Photo from the George Grantham Bain Collection, Library of Congress

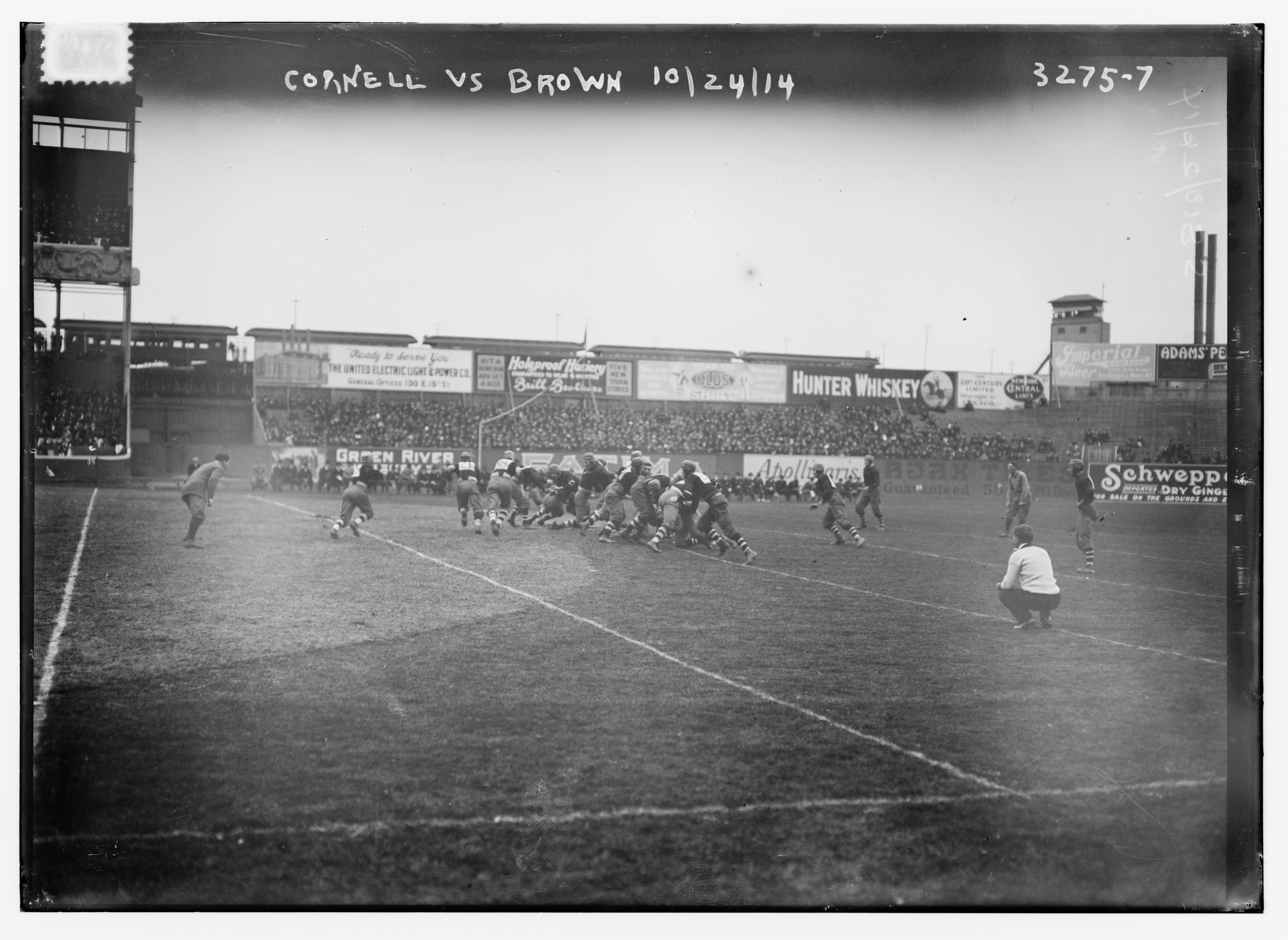
Photo from the George Grantham Bain Collection, Library of Congress
