= 1914 Franklin & Marshall Nevonians football team =

American college football season

1914 Franklin & Marshall Nevonians football
- Conference: Independent
- Record: 6–2–1
- Head coach: Charles Mayser (2nd season)
- Captain: Renzie Deihl
- Home stadium: Williamson Field

1914 Eastern college football independents records
	Conf.			Overall
Team	W	L	T	W		L		T
Army		–		9	–	0	–	0
Harvard		–		7	–	0	–	2
Washington & Jefferson		–		10	–	1	–	0
Dartmouth		–		8	–	1	–	0
Lehigh		–		8	–	1	–	0
Pittsburgh		–		8	–	1	–	0
Cornell		–		8	–	2	–	0
Yale		–		7	–	2	–	0
Franklin & Marshall		–		6	–	2	–	1
Colgate		–		5	–	2	–	1
Princeton		–		5	–	2	–	1
Brown		–		5	–	2	–	2
Fordham		–		6	–	3	–	1
Geneva		–		5	–	3	–	0
Tufts		–		5	–	3	–	0
Penn State		–		5	–	3	–	1
Rutgers		–		5	–	3	–	1
Lafayette		–		5	–	3	–	2
Syracuse		–		5	–	3	–	2
Boston College		–		5	–	4	–	0
NYU		–		5	–	4	–	0
Villanova		–		4	–	3	–	1
Bucknell		–		4	–	4	–	1
Carnegie Tech		–		4	–	4	–	0
Penn		–		4	–	4	–	1
Temple		–		3	–	3	–	0
Rhode Island State		–		2	–	3	–	3
Carlisle		–		5	–	10	–	1
Holy Cross		–		2	–	5	–	1
Vermont		–		2	–	6	–	1
New Hampshire		–		1	–	6	–	2
Duquesne		–		1	–	5	–	0

The 1914 Franklin & Marshall Nevonians football team was an American football team that represented Franklin & Marshall College during the 1914 college football season. The team compiled a 6–2–1 record and outscored opponents by a total of 103 to 56. The Nevonians were led by second-year head coach Charles Mayser.

== Schedule ==
Date	Opponent	Site	Result	Attendance	Source
September 26	at Lehigh	Taylor Stadium; South Bethlehem, PA	L 0–12	3,000	
October 3	at Penn	Franklin Field; Philadelphia, PA	W 10–0		
October 10	Lebanon Valley	Williamson Field; Lancaster, PA	W 3–0		
October 17	Swarthmore	Williamson Field; Lancaster, PA (rivalry)	W 16–0		
October 24	Dickinson	Williamson Field; Lancaster, PA (rivalry)	W 44–6		
October 31	at Haverford	Haverford, PA	W 14–0		
November 7	at Cornell	Schoellkopf Field; Ithaca, NY	L 3–26		
November 14	at Ursinus	Collegeville, PA	T 6–6		
November 26	Gettysburg	Williamson Field; Lancaster, PA (rivalry)	W 7–6		
