= 1914 Washington & Jefferson Red and Black football team =

American college football season

1914 Washington & Jefferson Red and Black football
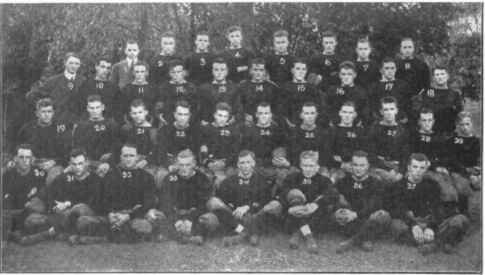
- Conference: Independent
- Record: 10–1
- Head coach: Bob Folwell (3rd season)

1914 Eastern college football independents records
	Conf.			Overall
Team	W	L	T	W		L		T
Army		–		9	–	0	–	0
Harvard		–		7	–	0	–	2
Washington & Jefferson		–		10	–	1	–	0
Dartmouth		–		8	–	1	–	0
Lehigh		–		8	–	1	–	0
Pittsburgh		–		8	–	1	–	0
Cornell		–		8	–	2	–	0
Yale		–		7	–	2	–	0
Franklin & Marshall		–		6	–	2	–	1
Colgate		–		5	–	2	–	1
Princeton		–		5	–	2	–	1
Brown		–		5	–	2	–	2
Fordham		–		6	–	3	–	1
Geneva		–		5	–	3	–	0
Tufts		–		5	–	3	–	0
Penn State		–		5	–	3	–	1
Rutgers		–		5	–	3	–	1
Lafayette		–		5	–	3	–	2
Syracuse		–		5	–	3	–	2
Boston College		–		5	–	4	–	0
NYU		–		5	–	4	–	0
Villanova		–		4	–	3	–	1
Bucknell		–		4	–	4	–	1
Carnegie Tech		–		4	–	4	–	0
Penn		–		4	–	4	–	1
Temple		–		3	–	3	–	0
Rhode Island State		–		2	–	3	–	3
Carlisle		–		5	–	10	–	1
Holy Cross		–		2	–	5	–	1
Vermont		–		2	–	6	–	1
New Hampshire		–		1	–	6	–	2
Duquesne		–		1	–	5	–	0

The 1914 Washington & Jefferson Red and Black football team was an American football team that represented Washington & Jefferson College as an independent during the 1914 college football season. Led by third-year head Bob Folwell, Washington & Jefferson compiled a record of 10–1.

== Schedule ==
Date	Time	Opponent	Site	Result	Attendance	Source
September 26		Mount Union	Washington, PA	W 26–2		
October 3		Dickinson	Washington, PA	W 105–0		
October 10		Harvard	Harvard Stadium; Boston, MA	L 9–10		
October 17		Westminster (PA)	Washington, PA	W 28–0		
October 24		at Yale	Yale Field; New Haven, CT	W 13–7		
October 31		West Virginia	Washington, PA	W 48–0		
November 7	2:30 p.m.	at Pittsburgh	Forbes Field; Pittsburgh, PA	W 13–10	30,000	
November 14		vs. West Virginia Wesleyan	Wheeling, WV	W 59–6		
November 21		at Georgetown	Georgetown Field; Washington, DC	W 14–6		
November 26		Bucknell	Washington, PA	W 34–0		
November 28		vs. Rutgers	Polo Grounds; New York, NY	W 20–13		
