= 1914 Colgate football team =

American college football season

1914 Colgate football
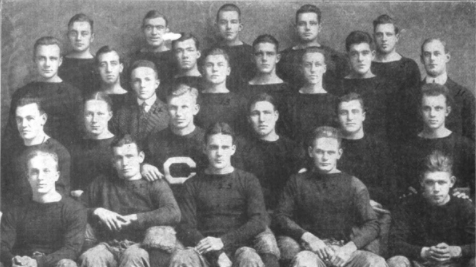
- Conference: Independent
- Record: 5–2–1
- Head coach: Laurence Bankart (3rd season)
- Captain: Wallace Swarthout
- Home stadium: Whitnall Field

1914 Eastern college football independents records
	Conf.			Overall
Team	W	L	T	W		L		T
Army		–		9	–	0	–	0
Harvard		–		7	–	0	–	2
Washington & Jefferson		–		10	–	1	–	0
Dartmouth		–		8	–	1	–	0
Lehigh		–		8	–	1	–	0
Pittsburgh		–		8	–	1	–	0
Cornell		–		8	–	2	–	0
Yale		–		7	–	2	–	0
Franklin & Marshall		–		6	–	2	–	1
Colgate		–		5	–	2	–	1
Princeton		–		5	–	2	–	1
Brown		–		5	–	2	–	2
Fordham		–		6	–	3	–	1
Geneva		–		5	–	3	–	0
Tufts		–		5	–	3	–	0
Penn State		–		5	–	3	–	1
Rutgers		–		5	–	3	–	1
Lafayette		–		5	–	3	–	2
Syracuse		–		5	–	3	–	2
Boston College		–		5	–	4	–	0
NYU		–		5	–	4	–	0
Villanova		–		4	–	3	–	1
Bucknell		–		4	–	4	–	1
Carnegie Tech		–		4	–	4	–	0
Penn		–		4	–	4	–	1
Temple		–		3	–	3	–	0
Rhode Island State		–		2	–	3	–	3
Carlisle		–		5	–	10	–	1
Holy Cross		–		2	–	5	–	1
Vermont		–		2	–	6	–	1
New Hampshire		–		1	–	6	–	2
Duquesne		–		1	–	5	–	0

The 1914 Colgate football team was an American football team that represented Colgate University as an independent during the 1914 college football season. In its third season under head coach Laurence Bankart, the team compiled a 5–2–1 record and outscored opponents by a total of 146 to 73. Wallace Swarthout was the team captain. The team played its home games on Whitnall Field in Hamilton, New York.

== Schedule ==
Date	Opponent	Site	Result	Attendance	Source
September 26	Ohio Wesleyan	Whitnall Field; Hamilton, NY	W 40–0		
October 3	at Cornell	Percy Field; Ithaca, NY (rivalry)	W 7–3		
October 10	Massachusetts	Whitnall Field; Hamilton, NY	W 25–0		
October 17	at Army	The Plain; West Point, NY	L 7–21		
October 24	Vermont	Whitnall Field; Hamilton, NY	W 42–0		
October 31	at Yale	Yale Field; New Haven, CT	L 7–49		
November 7	at Rochester	Rochester, NY	W 18–0		
November 14	at Syracuse	Archbold Stadium; Syracuse, NY (rivalry)	T 0–0	20,000	
