= 1914 Penn Quakers football team =

American college football season

1914 Penn Quakers football
- Conference: Independent
- Record: 4–4–1
- Head coach: George H. Brooke (2nd season)
- Captain: Albert Journeay
- Home stadium: Franklin Field

1914 Eastern college football independents records
	Conf.			Overall
Team	W	L	T	W		L		T
Army		–		9	–	0	–	0
Harvard		–		7	–	0	–	2
Washington & Jefferson		–		10	–	1	–	0
Dartmouth		–		8	–	1	–	0
Lehigh		–		8	–	1	–	0
Pittsburgh		–		8	–	1	–	0
Cornell		–		8	–	2	–	0
Yale		–		7	–	2	–	0
Franklin & Marshall		–		6	–	2	–	1
Colgate		–		5	–	2	–	1
Princeton		–		5	–	2	–	1
Brown		–		5	–	2	–	2
Fordham		–		6	–	3	–	1
Geneva		–		5	–	3	–	0
Tufts		–		5	–	3	–	0
Penn State		–		5	–	3	–	1
Rutgers		–		5	–	3	–	1
Lafayette		–		5	–	3	–	2
Syracuse		–		5	–	3	–	2
Boston College		–		5	–	4	–	0
NYU		–		5	–	4	–	0
Villanova		–		4	–	3	–	1
Bucknell		–		4	–	4	–	1
Carnegie Tech		–		4	–	4	–	0
Penn		–		4	–	4	–	1
Temple		–		3	–	3	–	0
Rhode Island State		–		2	–	3	–	3
Carlisle		–		5	–	10	–	1
Holy Cross		–		2	–	5	–	1
Vermont		–		2	–	6	–	1
New Hampshire		–		1	–	6	–	2
Duquesne		–		1	–	5	–	0

The 1914 Penn Quakers football team was an American football team that represented the University of Pennsylvania in the 1914 college football season. In their second season under head coach George H. Brooke, the Quakers compiled a 4–4–1 record and were outscored by a total of 121 to 89.

== Schedule ==
Date	Opponent	Site	Result	Attendance	Source
September 26	Gettysburg	Franklin Field; Philadelphia, PA	W 14–0		
October 3	Franklin & Marshall	Franklin Field; Philadelphia, PA	L 0–10		
October 10	Lafayette	Franklin Field; Philadelphia, PA	T 0–0		
October 17	Navy	Franklin Field; Philadelphia, PA	W 13–6		
October 24	Carlisle	Franklin Field; Philadelphia, PA	W 7–0		
October 31	Swarthmore	Franklin Field; Philadelphia, PA	W 40–6		
November 7	at Michigan	Ferry Field; Ann Arbor, MI	L 3–34	21,146	
November 14	Dartmouth	Franklin Field; Philadelphia, PA	L 0–41		
November 28	Cornell	Franklin Field; Philadelphia, PA (rivalry)	L 12–24		
