= 1914 Bucknell football team =

American college football season

1914 Bucknell football
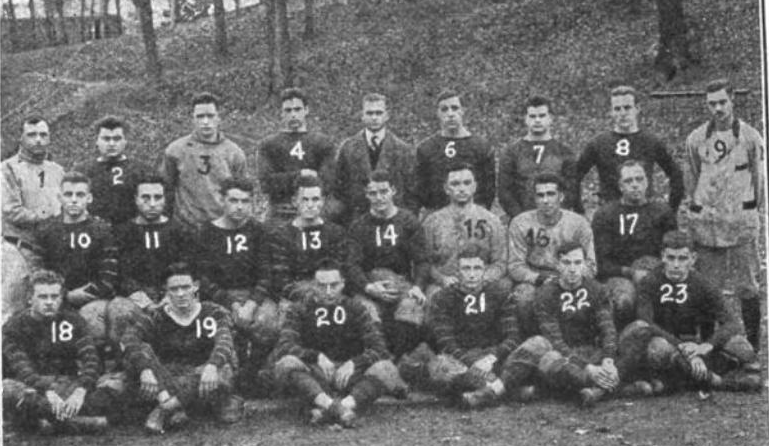
- Conference: Independent
- Record: 4–4–1
- Head coach: George Cockill (1st season)

1914 Eastern college football independents records
	Conf.			Overall
Team	W	L	T	W		L		T
Army		–		9	–	0	–	0
Harvard		–		7	–	0	–	2
Washington & Jefferson		–		10	–	1	–	0
Dartmouth		–		8	–	1	–	0
Lehigh		–		8	–	1	–	0
Pittsburgh		–		8	–	1	–	0
Cornell		–		8	–	2	–	0
Yale		–		7	–	2	–	0
Franklin & Marshall		–		6	–	2	–	1
Colgate		–		5	–	2	–	1
Princeton		–		5	–	2	–	1
Brown		–		5	–	2	–	2
Fordham		–		6	–	3	–	1
Geneva		–		5	–	3	–	0
Tufts		–		5	–	3	–	0
Penn State		–		5	–	3	–	1
Rutgers		–		5	–	3	–	1
Lafayette		–		5	–	3	–	2
Syracuse		–		5	–	3	–	2
Boston College		–		5	–	4	–	0
NYU		–		5	–	4	–	0
Villanova		–		4	–	3	–	1
Bucknell		–		4	–	4	–	1
Carnegie Tech		–		4	–	4	–	0
Penn		–		4	–	4	–	1
Temple		–		3	–	3	–	0
Rhode Island State		–		2	–	3	–	3
Carlisle		–		5	–	10	–	1
Holy Cross		–		2	–	5	–	1
Vermont		–		2	–	6	–	1
New Hampshire		–		1	–	6	–	2
Duquesne		–		1	–	5	–	0

The 1914 Bucknell football team was an American football team that represented Bucknell University as an independent during the 1914 college football season. In its first and only season under head coach George Cockill, the team compiled a 4–4–1 record.

== Schedule ==
Date	Opponent	Site	Result	Attendance	Source
September 26	Newberry Athletic Club	Lewisburg, PA	W 72–0		
October 3	at Princeton	Palmer Stadium; Princeton, NJ	L 0–10		
October 10	at Swarthmore	Swarthmore, PA	L 0–9		
October 17	at Cornell	Ithaca, NY	L 0–48		
October 24	Susquehanna	Lewisburg, PA	W 43–0		
October 31	at Muhlenberg	Allentown, PA	T 0–0		
November 7	Albright	Lewisburg, PA	W 42–0		
November 14	vs. Gettysburg	Island Park; Harrisburg, PA	W 25–0		
November 26	at Washington & Jefferson	Washington, PA	L 0–34		
