= 1914 Harvard Crimson football team =

American college football season

1914 Harvard Crimson football
- Conference: Independent
- Record: 7–0–2
- Head coach: Percy Haughton (7th season)
- Captain: Charles Brickley
- Home stadium: Harvard Stadium

1914 Eastern college football independents records
	Conf.			Overall
Team	W	L	T	W		L		T
Army		–		9	–	0	–	0
Harvard		–		7	–	0	–	2
Washington & Jefferson		–		10	–	1	–	0
Dartmouth		–		8	–	1	–	0
Lehigh		–		8	–	1	–	0
Pittsburgh		–		8	–	1	–	0
Cornell		–		8	–	2	–	0
Yale		–		7	–	2	–	0
Franklin & Marshall		–		6	–	2	–	1
Colgate		–		5	–	2	–	1
Princeton		–		5	–	2	–	1
Brown		–		5	–	2	–	2
Fordham		–		6	–	3	–	1
Geneva		–		5	–	3	–	0
Tufts		–		5	–	3	–	0
Penn State		–		5	–	3	–	1
Rutgers		–		5	–	3	–	1
Lafayette		–		5	–	3	–	2
Syracuse		–		5	–	3	–	2
Boston College		–		5	–	4	–	0
NYU		–		5	–	4	–	0
Villanova		–		4	–	3	–	1
Bucknell		–		4	–	4	–	1
Carnegie Tech		–		4	–	4	–	0
Penn		–		4	–	4	–	1
Temple		–		3	–	3	–	0
Rhode Island State		–		2	–	3	–	3
Carlisle		–		5	–	10	–	1
Holy Cross		–		2	–	5	–	1
Vermont		–		2	–	6	–	1
New Hampshire		–		1	–	6	–	2
Duquesne		–		1	–	5	–	0

The 1914 Harvard Crimson football team represented Harvard University in the 1914 college football season. The Crimson finished with an undefeated 7–0–2 record under seventh-year head coach Percy Haughton. Harvard outscored its opponents by a combined score of 187–28, but tied Penn State and Brown.

Walter Camp selected four Harvard players (end Huntington "Tack" Hardwick, tackle Walter Trumbull, guard Stan Pennock, and halfback Eddie Mahan) as first-team members of his All-American Team.

The Crimson played in the inaugural game at the Yale Bowl on November 21; Harvard defeated rival Yale, 36–0, with over 68,000 in attendance.

== Schedule ==
Date	Opponent	Site	Result	Attendance	Source
September 26	Bates	Harvard Stadium; Boston, MA	W 44–0		
October 3	Springfield YMCA	Harvard Stadium; Boston, MA	W 44–0		
October 10	Washington & Jefferson	Harvard Stadium; Boston, MA	W 10–9		
October 17	Tufts	Harvard Stadium; Boston, MA	W 13–6		
October 24	Penn State	Harvard Stadium; Boston, MA	T 13–13	22,000	
October 31	Michigan	Harvard Stadium; Boston, MA	W 7–0	23,213	
November 7	Princeton	Harvard Stadium; Boston, MA (rivalry)	W 20–0		
November 14	Brown	Harvard Stadium; Boston, MA	T 0–0		
November 21	at Yale	Yale Bowl; New Haven, CT (rivalry)	W 36–0	71,000	
