= Skip Wymard =

American football player and coach (1890–1970)

Biographical details
- Born: December 30, 1890; Pittsburgh, Pennsylvania, U.S.
- Died: June 23, 1970; Philadelphia, Pennsylvania, U.S.

Playing career
- 1908–1911: Georgetown
- Position: Tackle

Coaching career (HC unless noted)
- 1914: Fordham

Head coaching record
- Overall: 6–3–1

Norman Lawrence "Skip" Wymard (December 30, 1890 – June 23, 1970) was an American football player and coach. He served as the head football at Fordham University for one season, in 1914, compiling a record of 6–3–1. Wymard played tackle at Georgetown University.

Wymard was later an attorney based in Pittsburgh, Pennsylvania. In 1949, he was appointed as the secretary to Pennsylvania governor James H. Duff.

== Head coaching record ==
Year	Team	Overall	Conference	Standing	Bowl/playoffs
Fordham Maroon (Independent) (1914)
1914	Fordham	6–3–1			
Fordham:		6–3–1			
Total:		6–3–1			
