= Gill Stadium =

Sporting stadium located in Manchester, New Hampshire

- Interactive map of Gill Stadium
- Former names: Beech Street Grounds (1880–1893); Varick Park (1894–1912); Textile Field (1913–1926); Athletic Field (1927–1967)
- Location: Manchester, NH 03102
- Coordinates: 42°58′55″N 71°27′16″W
- Owner: Thomas Varick c. 1880s; William Freeman c. 1890s–1912; Amoskeag Manufacturing Company (1913–1927); City of Manchester (1927–present)
- Capacity: 3,012
- Surface: FieldTurf
- Field size: Left Field: 312 ft (95 m); Center Field: 400 ft (120 m); Right Field: 321 ft (98 m)

Construction
- Opened: c. 1880
- Renovated: 1913, 2004
- Builder: Amoskeag Textile Club (1913)

Tenants
- Manchester Amoskeags (NEL) (1891); New Hampshire Fisher Cats (EL) (2004)

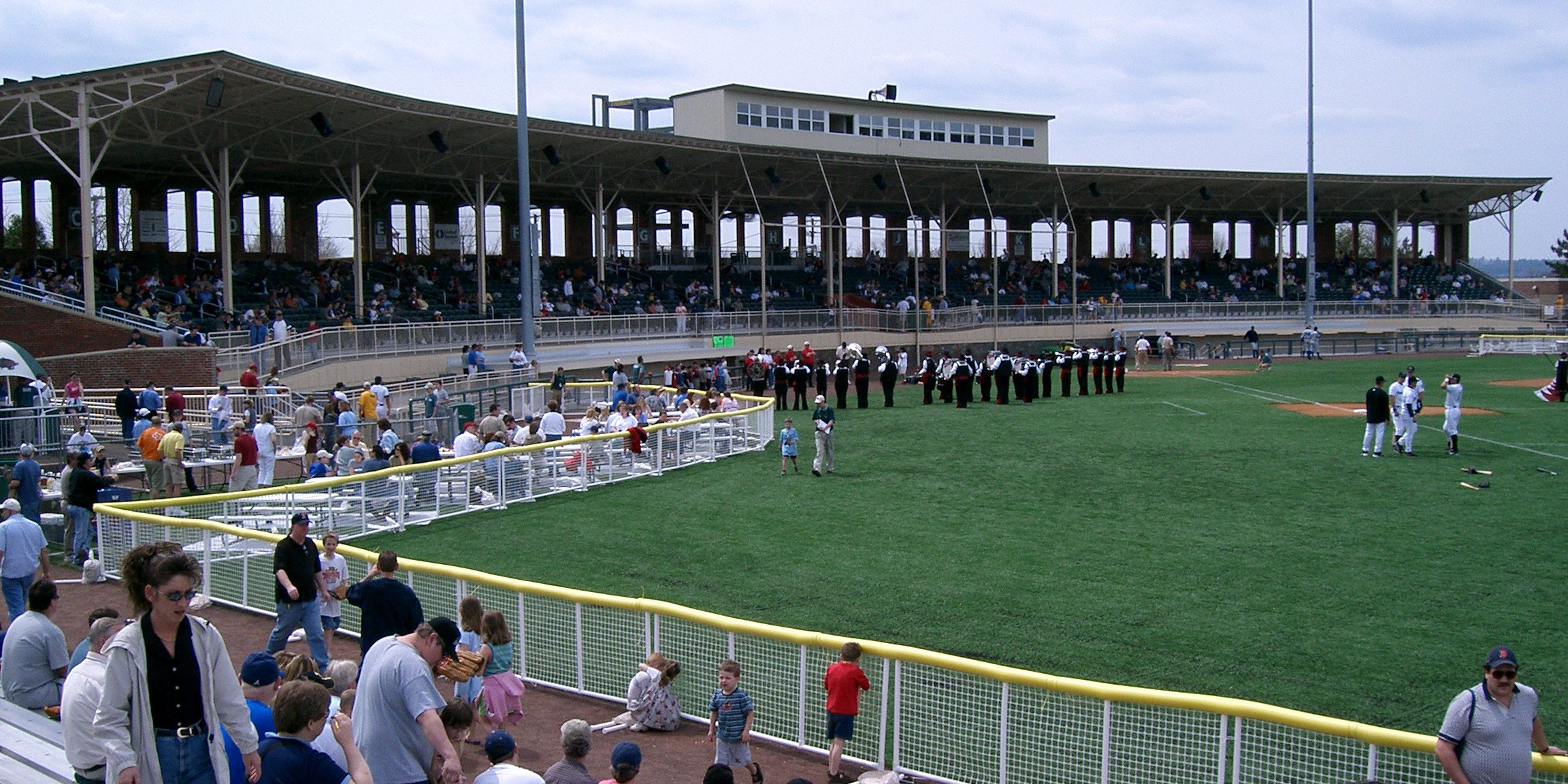
The Gill Stadium grandstand in 2004, the year the Fisher Cats played there. In the foreground is the concession and fan seating area the Fisher Cats installed adjacent to right field. The gentle curve of the grandstand is a compromise to watching football games, and creates a large foul territory for baseball.

Gill Stadium is a sporting stadium located in Manchester, New Hampshire. It is one of the oldest concrete-and-steel ballparks in the United States. The venue, which mainly hosts amateur baseball and football contests, has a capacity of 3,012.

== Beech Street Grounds ==
Children and organized amateur teams had played baseball since at least 1880 in the area east of the Valley Cemetery, which was known as "the Plains."

A ballpark called the Beech Street Grounds was built on the site of Gill Stadium at the corner of Beech and Valley Streets, on land owned by the Amoskeag Manufacturing Company. The park had a wooden fence and two wooden grandstands. Its main entrance was located on Beech Street. This was near third base, and home plate was in the field's southwest corner. The other two surrounding streets were Maple to the east and Green to the north. Baseball was played there between 1891 and 1894. In its first two years, the park was home to a minor-league baseball team, the Manchester Amoskeags of the New England League.

== Varick Park ==
In 1894, local businessman Thomas Varick purchased an interest in the park, moved the two grandstands and designated one as men-only, constructed a 40-foot-wide, quarter-mile dirt bicycle and running track, and renamed the complex Varick Park. The baseball diamond was reoriented so that home plate was along the west (Beech Street) side of the field and the entrance was off Valley Street. As well as baseball, the park hosted track-and-field events, football and soccer games, and outdoor events for Amoskeag.

During the 1890s, control of Varick Park passed from Varick to William Freeman. The park was again home to several minor-league baseball teams in the New England League called the Manchester Amoskeags in 1891, the Manchesters in 1899, and the Manchester Textiles in 1906.

== Textile Field ==
In June 1912, Amoskeag officials began negotiations with Freeman to take control of the park for use by the city manufacturers' baseball league. In December 1912, Amoskeag announced that the field had been renamed Textile Field and that it would be reoriented and completely rebuilt as a modern, brick-and-concrete baseball facility.

The current grandstand was built in 1913 at a cost of more than $30,000. It was designed by Amoskeag engineers using brick in the style and color of the mills in Amoskeag's millyard, and built by the Amoskeag Textile Club, which was funded by Amoskeag and whose members were Amoskeag employees.

A single, covered grandstand was built, gently curved to provide for watching either baseball or football. For safety, concrete ramps were constructed along the sides and rear of the grandstand. Steel trusses and posts supported the roof. Although portions of the roof, floor, and some of the posts supporting the seating platform were of wood, publications from the period of construction — including Amoskeag's employee newspaper, the Amoskeag Bulletin — considered it "fireproof", like those being built in major-league cities between 1909 and 1915.

Textile Field was one of the first concrete-and-steel stadiums in the United States, the first not in a major city. Only Harvard Stadium (1903) in Allston, Massachusetts; Rickwood Field (1910) in Birmingham, Alabama; and Fenway Park (1912) in Boston, Massachusetts, are older surviving examples.

The construction appears to have been part of Amoskeag's benevolence programs. Amoskeag, which employed about 17,000 people in a city of 65,000, included among its workforce a large number of immigrants. In the minds of Amoskeag managers, the most troublesome of this group were the most recent arrivals from Greece. Recent immigrants from southern and eastern Europe were being blamed for the 1912 Bread and Roses Strike in nearby Lawrence, Massachusetts, which resulted in much violence and the involvement of the radical Industrial Workers of the World union. Amoskeag, which was not unionized, wanted no such trouble, particularly in light of the fact that IWW operatives were seen in Manchester during the Lawrence strike. The company hoped to find a way to "Americanize" its workforce, thereby giving workers a stronger connection to the company and to the United States, and to find diversionary activities, like baseball, to keep them from unionizing in their free time.

Amoskeag, along with the McElwain Shoe Company and other industries in Manchester, organized the city Manufacturers' League in 1912. The league played at three locations in Manchester, of which Varick Park was the most important. Its reconstruction in 1913 as Textile Field made the league seem more professional. Textile Field made its debut over Memorial Day weekend of 1913, but the grandstand was not entirely completed until late July. The dedication game came on September 8, when the World Champion Boston Red Sox — playing its major-league lineup for nearly the entire game — defeated the Manufacturers' League All-Stars, 3–1. A year later, the World Champion Philadelphia Athletics defeated the All-Stars, 7–1. The score and the "vaudeville" act put on by the Athletics in the final inning — in which they changed positions and performed "trick" plays — made Amoskeag reconsider its commitment. Increased on- and off-field problems with players, who were hired ostensibly to work for the textile company but in reality were employed for their baseball skills, also led the Textile Club to withdraw its support for the Manufacturers League.

A team from the New England League moved from Fitchburg, Massachusetts, to Textile Field in July 1914 as the Manchester Textiles. It played there in 1915 as well. Thereafter, Textile Field became the sole domain of the city's manufacturers and schools until 1926. In September 1923, Amoskeag brought in the National League's Brooklyn Robins (now known as the Los Angeles Dodgers) to play against the company team.

== Athletic Field ==
Textile Field was purchased by the City of Manchester in 1927 and, in a name-the-field contest conducted by the Manchester Union-Leader, renamed Athletic Field. Athletic Field hosted three professional teams of the New England League: The Manchester Blue Sox played there from 1926–1930, winning championships in 1926 and 1929, but the league folded in mid-1930. The Manchester Giants, affiliated with the New York Giants, made the post-season in 1946 and 1947; and the Manchester Yankees, affiliated with the New York Yankees, played there in 1948 but disbanded on July 19, 1949 for financial reasons.

== Gill Stadium ==
The view of Gill Stadium from the south (across Valley Street). This 2004 photo shows the construction of the elevator to the rooftop press box. A temporary poster describing the renovations is attached to the ticket booth.

In 1967, the stadium was renamed Gill Stadium, after former Parks and Recreation Director Ignace J. Gill, who served from 1935 to 1967. In 1971 and 1972, an Eastern League (class A) team, also called the Yankees, played there. Additionally, the Eastern League's Nashua Angels played a game at Gill Stadium in 1983.

The stadium was renovated extensively in preparation for the inaugural 2004 baseball season of the Eastern League's New Hampshire Fisher Cats (the class AA affiliate of the Toronto Blue Jays), acquiring an aluminum floor and molded plastic chairs, new clubhouses adjacent to the grandstand, and dugouts in what was formerly the dirt track. An elevator provided handicapped access to the rooftop press box. The grass surface was replaced with FieldTurf and the ticket booth and lavatories were renovated.

The Fisher Cats brought the 2004 Eastern League title home to Gill. In 2005, a new municipal baseball stadium — now known as Delta Dental Stadium — was completed along the Merrimack River near downtown, and the Fisher Cats made their scheduled move there.

Over the years, Gill Stadium has served as the home field for city high-school and American Legion ball clubs. The stadium hosted the American Legion World Series on five occasions. Gill Stadium continues to host numerous amateur baseball teams, and Manchester's annual Thanksgiving football tournament, the Turkey Bowl, which pits two of the four city schools against each other each year based on their performance during the just-completed season.

On-site parking comprises 300 spaces, accessible from Beech Street. Additional parking may be available just north at the adjacent John F. Kennedy Memorial Coliseum, or on side streets.
