= World Famous Indians =

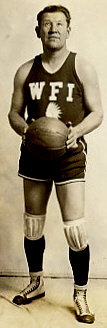
Jim Thorpe

The World Famous Indians were a basketball team that played exhibition games on tour (barnstorming) in the United States during the 1920s. Among their opponents were the Buffalo Silents of Buffalo, New York, a team whose members were deaf and/or mute.

The team was based out of LaRue, Ohio. LaRue also hosted the National Football League's Oorang Indians in 1922 and 1923, a traveling team of Native American players that was also led by Jim Thorpe. LaRue was home to Oorang Kennels owner Walter Lingo who sponsored the team to advertise his business selling a select breed of Airedale Terriers.

Team members included Lassa, Haskell Hill (War Horse). Chim Lingrell (Tomahawk), Dennis Hilderbrand (Eagle Feathers) and Jack Thorpe with Jim Thorpe coaching. The team was reported to have won 53 games and lost 11 against eastern colleges in 1923.

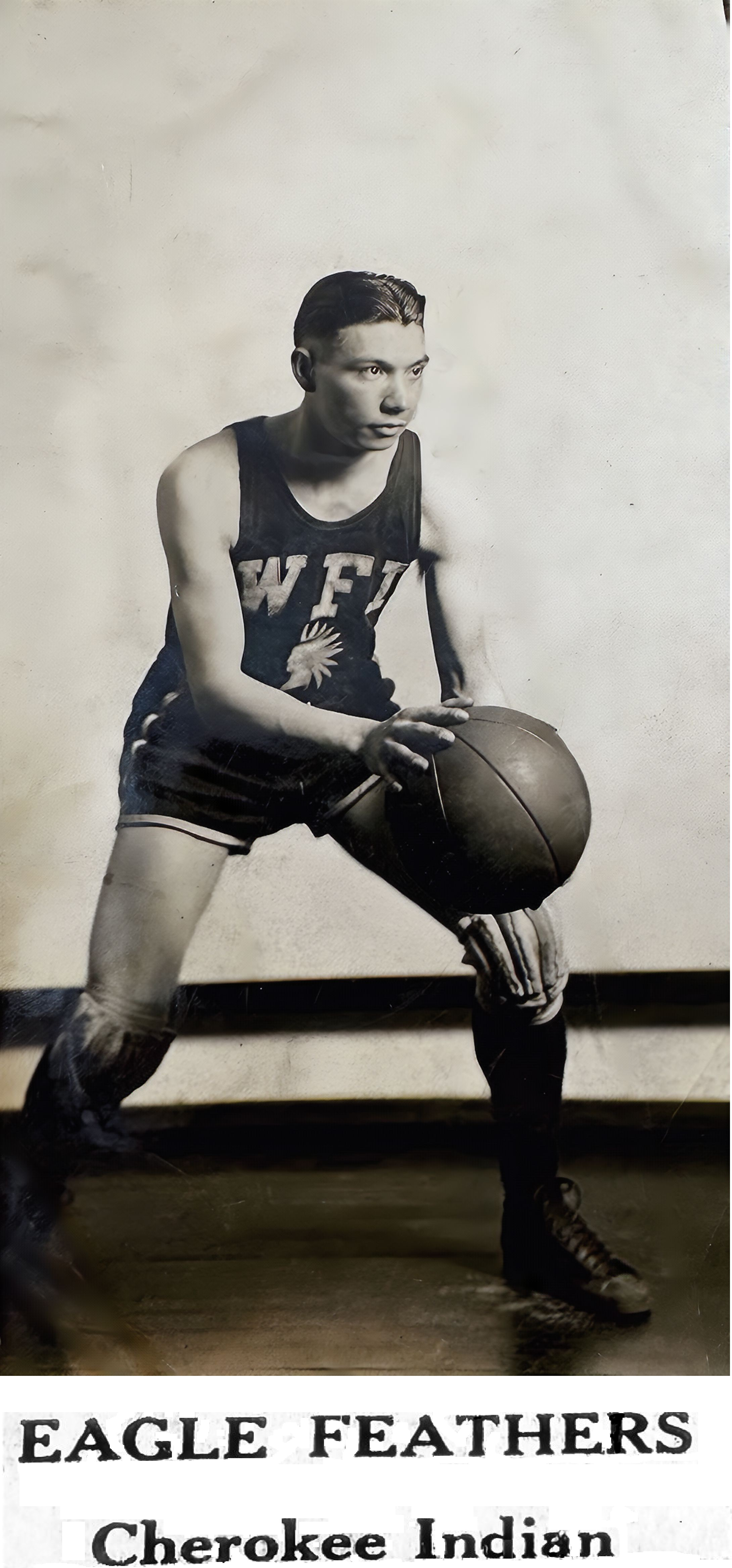
Dennis Hilderbrand
