= Elmer Busch =

American football player (1889–1949)

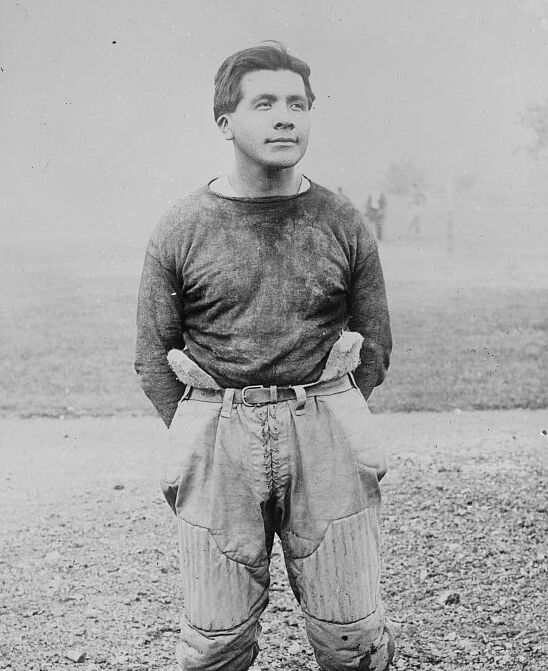

Profile
- Position: Guard

Personal information
- Born: June 1, 1889; Potter Valley, California, U.S.
- Died: January 14, 1949 (aged 59); Ukiah, California, U.S.
- Listed height: 5 ft 10 in (1.78 m)
- Listed weight: 200 lb (91 kg)

Career information
- College: Carlisle

Career history
- 1922: Oorang Indians

Awards and highlights
- Second-team All-American (1913); Captain Carlisle football team (1914)

Elmer Eugene "Pete" Busch (June 1, 1889 – January 14, 1949) was an American professional football player with the Oorang Indians of the National Football League (NFL) in 1922. He was a Native American member of the Pomo tribe. He played his college football at the Carlisle Indian School. In 1973, Busch was inducted into the American Indian Hall of Fame.

== Early life and family ==
Busch was born in 1890 to Jack and Maggie Busch, who lived in Potter Valley, California. Elmer had two brothers and a sister. Busch had been schooled at the Potter Valley Indian School, from 1897 until 1902, and the Sherman Institute in Riverside, California, from 1907 until 1910. While there, he was selected to attend the Carlisle Indian School.

== Carlisle Indian School ==
Busch, a Pomo, entered the Carlisle Indian School on October 10, 1910, at the age of 20. While attending Carlisle, he became interested in football. He joined the school's football team and played there from 1911 until 1914 as a tackle. In 1911, Carlisle won 11 and lost 1 game. The 1912 Carlisle team averaged less than 170 lb (77 kg). Busch, who was 22 years old, was the heaviest, weighing 186 lb (84 kg) and standing 5 ft 10 in (1.78 m) tall; another source reports him at 192 lb (87 kg). However, that year, Carlisle compiled a total of 504 points as against their opponents' 114 points. Their record was 12 wins, 1 loss, 1 tie. As a lineman, Busch consistently beat his heavier defensive opponents, allowing the backs to gain good yardage on their runs. In 1913, Carlisle won 10, lost 1, and tied 1 game. He was elected in 1913 as the team's captain for 1914. However, he lost the title to Pete Calac after he was forced to resign. After leaving the Carlisle School in April 1915 at age 25, he worked in the boiler department of the Santa Fe Railroad in San Bernardino from 1915 to 1917. He also coached football at Riverside from 1916 to 1917.

== Professional athletic career ==
He was a football coach at his alma mater, the Sherman Institute at Riverside (1916–17).

Busch played the 1922 NFL season with the Oorang Indians, a team composed completely of Native Americans. It was the idea of Walter Lingo, an Airedale breeder from LaRue, Ohio, with the sole intention of promoting his kennel. Busch left the team after the 1922 season.

== Career outside athletics ==
Busch worked in San Bernardino, California, in the boiler department of the AT & SF Railroad (1915–1917).
