= Emmett McLemore =

American football player (1899–1973)

No. 11, 30, 4
- Positions: End, quarterback

Personal information
- Born: September 12, 1899; Lyons, Oklahoma Territory, U.S.
- Died: May 19, 1973 (aged 73); Stilwell, Oklahoma, U.S.
- Listed height: 5 ft 8 in (1.73 m)
- Listed weight: 165 lb (75 kg)

Career information
- College: Haskell

Career history

Playing
- Oorang Indians (1923); Kansas City Blues (1924)

Coaching
- Stilwell HS (OK) (1928–1929) Head coach; Bacone (1930–1938) Head coach; Sequoyah Indian Training (OK) (1939–1946) Head coach; Jones Academy (OK) (1947–) Head coach

Career statistics
- Games played: 13
- Games started: 11
- Stats at Pro Football Reference

Emmett G. "Red Fox" McLemore (September 12, 1899 – May 19, 1973) was an American football player and coach. He played professionally in the National Football League (NFL) during the 1923 season with the Oorang Indians. The Indians were a team based in LaRue, Ohio, composed only of Native Americans, and coached by Jim Thorpe. McLemore spent the 1924 season with the Kansas City Blues.

On December 2, 1923, McLemore recorded a touchdown to Arrowhead and made a field goal after a Joe Guyon interception. However, he missed two extra point kicks in a 22–19 loss to the Chicago Cardinals. During that same game a McLemore punt hit a Cardinals' player and was soon picked up by Ted Buffalo for a score. A week later on December 7, McLemore caught two passes from Guyon for touchdowns in a 19–0 victory over the Louisville Brecks.

McLemore was born on later September 12, 1899. After his professional playing days, he attended Northeastern State Teachers College—now known as Northeastern State University—in Tahlequah, Oklahoma. He began coaching in 1928 at Stilwell High School in Stilwell, Oklahoma. In 1930, he was appointed head coach at Bacone College in Muskogee, Oklahoma. In 1938, he was hired as athletic coach at Sequoyah Indian Training School—now known as Sequoyah High School—in Park Hill, Oklahoma, and put in charge of all sports, including football, basketball, baseball, and track. McLemore moved on in 1947 to coach at Jones Academy in Hartshorne, Oklahoma.

McLemore served as a major in the United States Army Air Forces during World War II. He died on May 19, 1973, at Stilwell Municipal Hospital.
