= 1911 Carlisle Indians football team =

American college football season

1911 Carlisle Indians football
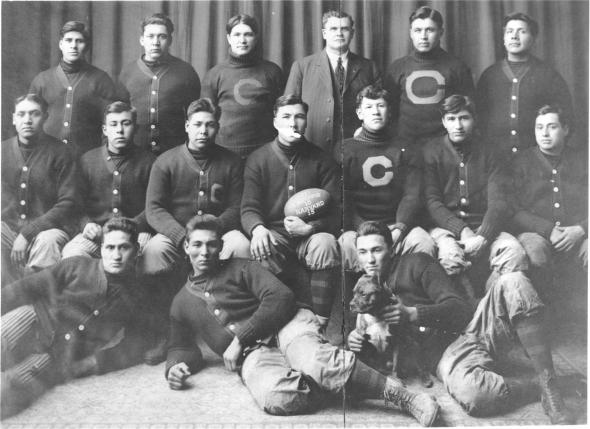
- Conference: Independent
- Record: 11–1
- Head coach: Pop Warner (10th season)
- Offensive scheme: Single-wing
- Captain: Sampson Bird
- Home stadium: Indian Field

1911 Eastern college football independents records
	Conf.			Overall
Team	W	L	T	W		L		T
Penn State		–		8	–	0	–	1
Carlisle		–		11	–	1	–	0
Princeton		–		8	–	0	–	2
Trinity (CT)		–		6	–	0	–	2
Temple		–		6	–	1	–	0
Army		–		6	–	1	–	1
Swarthmore		–		6	–	1	–	1
Dartmouth		–		8	–	2	–	0
Lafayette		–		8	–	2	–	0
Yale		–		7	–	2	–	1
Harvard		–		6	–	2	–	1
Cornell		–		7	–	3	–	0
Rhode Island State		–		5	–	2	–	1
Brown		–		7	–	3	–	1
Bucknell		–		6	–	3	–	1
Penn		–		7	–	4	–	0
Pittsburgh		–		4	–	3	–	1
Washington & Jefferson		–		6	–	4	–	0
Syracuse		–		5	–	3	–	2
Dickinson		–		4	–	4	–	0
Lehigh		–		5	–	5	–	1
Rutgers		–		4	–	4	–	1
Dickinson		–		4	–	4	–	0
St. Bonaventure		–		2	–	2	–	0
Carnegie Tech		–		4	–	5	–	0
Holy Cross		–		4	–	5	–	0
Tufts		–		3	–	4	–	0
Vermont		–		3	–	5	–	0
NYU		–		1	–	3	–	3
Colgate		–		3	–	6	–	0
Franklin & Marshall		–		3	–	6	–	0
New Hampshire		–		1	–	5	–	1
Geneva		–		1	–	6	–	1
Villanova		–		0	–	5	–	1
Boston College		–		0	–	7	–	0

The 1911 Carlisle Indians football team represented the Carlisle Indian Industrial School as an independent during the 1911 college football season. Led by tenth-year head coach Pop Warner, the Indians compiled a record of 11–1 and outscored opponents 298 to 49. The season included one of the greatest upsets in college football history. Against Harvard, Jim Thorpe scored all of the Indians' points in a shocking upset over the period powerhouse, 18–15. The only loss for Carlisle came at the hands of Syracuse the following week, 12–11. Walter Camp selected Thorpe first-team All-American. One source claims Thorpe was "recognized as the greatest player of the year and a man whose kicking is likely to revolutionize the game." College Football Hall of Fame members on the team include Thorpe, Gus Welch, and William "Lone Star" Dietz.

== Schedule ==
Date	Opponent	Site	Result	Attendance	Source
September 23	Lebanon Valley	Indian Field; Carlisle, PA	W 53–0		
September 27	Muhlenberg	Indian Field; Carlisle, PA	W 32–0		
September 30	Dickinson	Indian Field; Carlisle, PA	W 17–0		
October 7	Mount St. Mary's	Indian Field; Carlisle, PA	W 46–5		
October 14	at Georgetown	Georgetown Field; Washington, DC	W 28–5		
October 21	at Pittsburgh	Forbes Field; Pittsburgh, PA	W 17–0	8,000	
October 28	at Lafayette	March Field; Easton, PA	W 19–0		
November 4	at Penn	Franklin Field; Philadelphia, PA	W 16–0		
November 11	at Harvard	Harvard Stadium; Boston, MA	W 18–15		
November 18	at Syracuse	Archbold Stadium; Syracuse, NY	L 11–12		
November 25	at Johns Hopkins	Homewood Field; Baltimore, MD	W 29–6		
November 30	at Brown	Providence, RI	W 12–6	12,000	

== Players ==
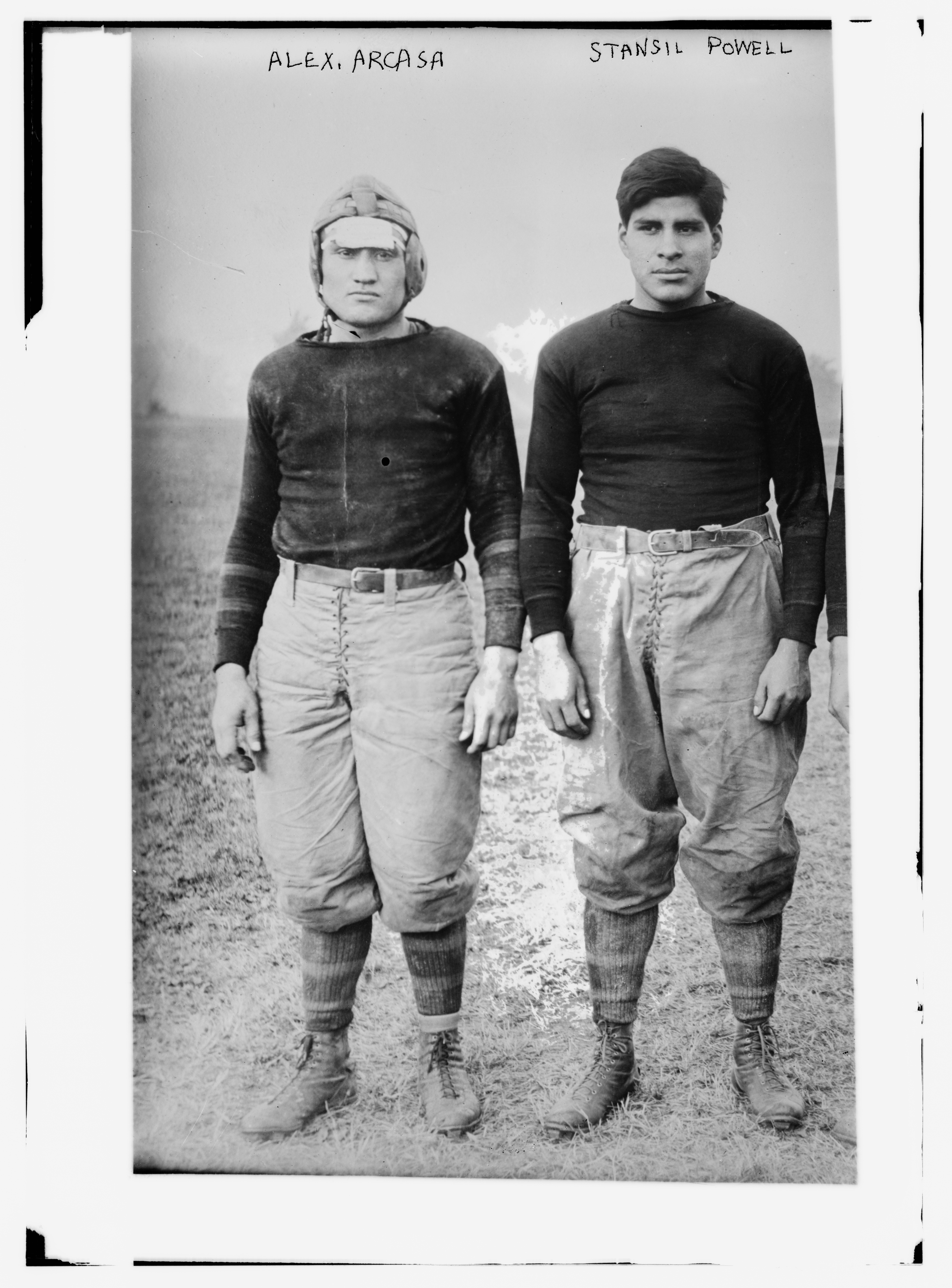
Alex Arcasa and Possum Powell.

=== Line ===
Player	Position	Games started	Hometown	Height	Weight	Age
Joseph Bergie	center			5'9"	168	19
Sampson Bird	end					
Elmer Busch	guard		Potter Valley, California	5'10"	186	21
William Henry "Lone Star" Dietz	tackle					
Henri	end					
Peter Jordan	guard					
Bill Newashe	tackle		Shawnee, Oklahoma			
Hugh Wheelock	end					

=== Backfield ===
Player	Position	Games started	Hometown	Height	Weight	Age
Alex Arcasa	halfback			5'8"	156	20
Stancil "Possum" Powell	fullback			5'10"	176	
Jim Thorpe	halfback		Stroud, Oklahoma	6'1"	180	
Gus Welch	quarterback		Spooner, Wisconsin	5'11"	152	20

== See also ==
- 1911 College Football All-America Team
