= Halftime show =

Performance given between halves of a sporting event

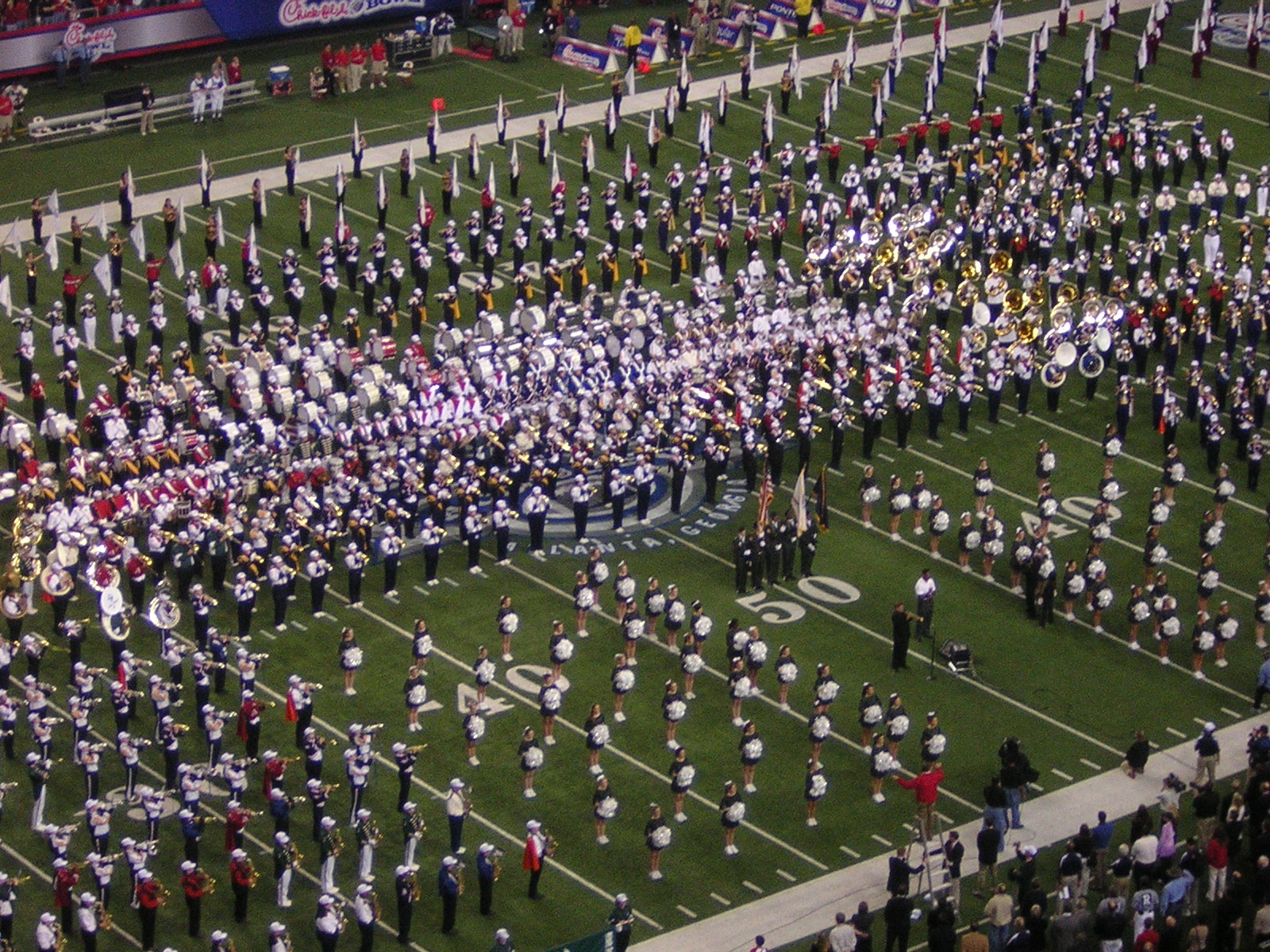
A group of high school marching bands performs at the halftime show of the 2006 Chick-fil-A Bowl.

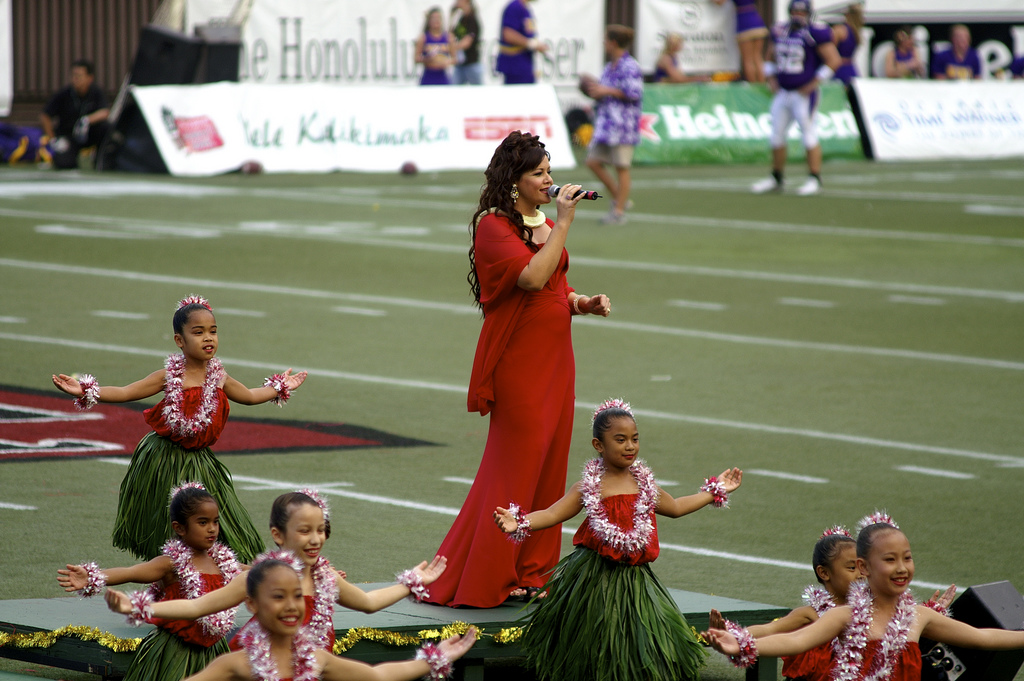
Amy Gilliom sings at the halftime show for the 2007 Hawaii Bowl.

A halftime show is a performance given during the brief period between the first and second halves, or the second and third quarters, of a sporting event. Halftime shows are not given for sports with an irregular or indeterminate number of divisions (such as baseball or boxing), or for sports that do not have an extended period of stoppage in play. Ice hockey games consist of three periods, so there are in effect two halftimes at a hockey game: the first intermission is between the first and second periods, and the second intermission comes between the second and third periods. The intermissions are usually given over to contests involving randomly selected audience members, although for major games, like the Winter Classic, the Stanley Cup Final, the NHL All-Star Game and the men's Frozen Four, the intermission between the 2nd and 3rd period often features entertainment typically found during halftime shows.

The first instance of a halftime show was in November 1892 at the University of Nebraska when General John J. Pershing required the ROTC band to march drills as a part of their performances. This was first showcased at a football game where the band marched drills at halftime. Since the band's military reviews had attracted significant crowds, the goal was to increase attendance at football games by conducting a military review while the team rested between halves.

Others generally attribute the invention of the halftime show to Walter Lingo. Lingo was the owner of a dog kennel and sponsored an all-Native American football team, the Oorang Indians, to tour the country and promote the kennel. In addition to playing football, the Indians would provide various forms of entertainment, including exhibiting the dogs, players demonstrating their prowess (Nick Lassa once wrestled a bear while Jim Thorpe would kick long-distance field goals), dancing, and demonstrations of native culture. Although the halftime show was in part designed to bring an additional draw to mask the fact that the Indians did not put much effort into the actual game, his halftime show was mostly the same from game to game, and the novelty wore off after two years.

A modern halftime show can consist of cheerleading performances, majorette routines, marching bands playing music, or other spectacular performances. Halftime shows are particularly well known among historically black colleges and universities, which have elaborate "battles of the bands" between the opposing schools' marching bands during halftimes of the most prominent games (see, for instance, the Bayou Classic). More common in modern times, especially in major games, is to reserve the entire halftime period for a short concert by a major recording artist.

The halftime show also often describes television studio shows during the intermission which review scores and stories from across the league's schedule during that break between action.

== Gridiron football ==
A halftime show is a traditional element in an American football and Canadian football game. During the interval between the second and third quarters (normally 20 minutes) some form of entertainment is presented on the field. The entertainment frequently consists of performances by marching bands.

At high school and most college games, the school bands of the two competing teams perform at halftime with the marching band of the visiting team performing first followed by the marching band of the home team. Often, the cheerleaders and/or a dance team will perform. Other activities may also take place, and these vary widely. Until sometime in the early 1980s, these shows were typically included as part of the broadcast if the game was televised; since that time, it has become traditional for TV networks to devote the halftime to a roundup of other games' scores as well as providing analysis.

During a professional football game, a high school or college band may be brought in to perform. For the Super Bowl and Grey Cup games, an elaborate show involving musicians, dancers, fireworks and other special effects has become the norm. High-profile acts are generally chosen for their broad appeal, due to the games' large audiences, and choices that deviate from that tend to be poorly received.

Many football historians believe halftime shows originated with the Oorang Indians of the early National Football League. The team was a marketing ploy by Walter Lingo to sell and promote his Airedale Terriers. He would lure audiences to his games with the promise of an outrageous halftime show, instead of the promise of a good football game. The team was called the Indians because they were made up entirely of Native Americans, and Oorang came from Lingo's Oorang Kennel Company. The Indians players participated in helping the Oorang Airedales perform tricks for the crowd before and after the game. However, it was their halftime entertainment that made them such a huge attraction in the early 1920s. There were shooting exhibitions with the dogs retrieving the targets. There were Native American dances and tomahawk and knife-throwing demonstrations. Indians player Nick Lassa, also called "Long-Time-Sleep", even wrestled a bear on occasion. Another show was a demonstration of the United States Indian scouts actions during World War I. The show promoted Lingo's kennels by showing the Airedale Red Cross dogs administering first aid to wounded soldiers. Many of the scouts and Red Cross dogs taking part in the event were real veterans of the war, while the German troops were impersonated by local American Legion men who wore German uniforms furnished by Lingo. The halftime activities soon became more important than the results of the game for the Indians fanbase. The Indians only won 3 games in their two seasons of existence.

=== Super Bowl ===
In the United States, the halftime show for the Super Bowl is perhaps the highlight of the event and can cost millions to stage.

On February 1, 2004, the live halftime show for Super Bowl XXXVIII, produced by music video giant MTV, sparked outrage among many viewers when Justin Timberlake, one of the performers, exposed fellow performer Janet Jackson's right breast in what was later dubbed a "wardrobe malfunction". Since it was broadcast live, the exposure was seen by millions when it happened.

=== Grey Cup ===
In Canada, the halftime show for the Grey Cup is a highlight of the event and can cost millions to stage. Performers over the years have included Justin Bieber, Shania Twain, Blue Rodeo, Black Eyed Peas, Keith Urban, Green Day and Imagine Dragons.

== Rugby football ==
A halftime show is a traditional element in a Rugby league and Rugby union game during a Grand final.

== Association football ==
Due to the time format and fan nature of association football, halftime shows are quite rare for the sport, although there have been halftime shows in major competitions. For example, Shakira performed in the halftime show during the 2024 Copa América final at Hard Rock Stadium in Miami Gardens, Florida.

On September 28, 2024, FIFA announced that Global Citizen would co-produce a halftime show for the 2026 FIFA World Cup final held on July 19, 2026 in East Rutherford, New Jersey, the first halftime show in the history of the FIFA World Cup.

== See also ==
- Seventh-inning stretch
- List of Super Bowl halftime shows
- List of Grey Cup halftime shows
- Tifo
- Card stunts
- The Cricket Show
