= Arrowhead (American football) =

Native American football player

No. 14
- Position: End

Personal information
- Born: United States
- Died: Unknown
- Listed height: 5 ft 7 in (1.70 m)
- Listed weight: 160 lb (73 kg)

Career information
- College: Miami (Ohio)

Career history
- Oorang Indians (1923)
- Stats at Pro Football Reference

Arrowhead was an American professional football player who played in the National Football League during the 1923 season. That season, he joined the NFL's Oorang Indians. The Indians were a team based in LaRue, Ohio, composed only of Native Americans, and coached by Jim Thorpe. Arrowhead was a member of the Chippewas.

He played in only four games in 1923 with the Indians, however he scored two touchdowns during that time. On November 11, 1923, Arrowhead caught a pass from Thorpe for the Indians only score in 14–7 loss to the St. Louis All-Stars. On December 2, 1923, he caught a 15-yard pass from Emmett McLemore for a score in a 22–19 loss to the Chicago Cardinals.
