= Joe Little Twig =

American football player (1893–1939)

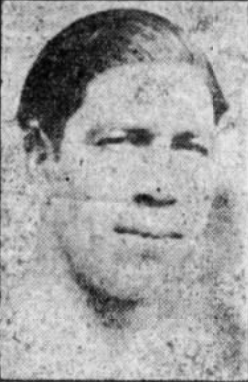

No. 5, 9, 17
- Position: Tackle / End

Personal information
- Born: 1893; Hogansburg, New York, U.S.
- Died: March 6, 1939; Canton, Ohio, U.S.
- Listed height: 5 ft 11 in (1.80 m)
- Listed weight: 183 lb (83 kg)

Career information
- College: Carlisle Indian

Career history
- Oorang Indians (1922–1923); Rock Island Independents (1924–1925); Akron Indians (1926); Canton Bulldogs (1926)

Awards and highlights
- GB Press-Gazette: 1st team all-NFL (1924)
- Military career
- Allegiance: United States
- Branch: U.S. Army
- Service years: 1917-1921
- Conflicts: World War I
- Stats at Pro Football Reference

Joseph Little Twig (Johnson) (1893 - March 6, 1939) was a professional football player, who played during the early years of the National Football League (NFL). For 1922 until 1926, he played in the league for the Oorang Indians, Rock Island Independents, Akron Indians and the Canton Bulldogs.

== Football ==
Little Twig, a member of the Mohawk nation, first played football at Thomas Indian School on the Cattaraugus Reservation and then at the Carlisle Indian School located in Carlisle, Pennsylvania. Before starting his NFL career, Little Twig served in the United States Army from 1917 until 1921. He was stationed overseas during World War I. In 1922, he joined the Oorang Indians; Jim Thorpe's All Indian Football team in LaRue, Ohio. He spent two years with the Indians. After the franchise folded in 1923, Little Twig and Thorpe joined the Rock Island Independents for the 1924 and 1925 seasons. He finished his NFL career in 1926, playing with the Akron Indians and the Canton Bulldogs.

== Post-football career ==
In 1927, Little Twig joined the Canton Police Department. While on the police force, he served as a patrolman on motorcycle duty. He left the force in 1931. In 1929 JLittle Twig married Gertrude Hale. Thorpe attended the ceremony and acted as best man. In 1935 Little Twig divorced his first wife and married a Winifred (Winnie) Wood. With this wife Little Twig had two daughters Norma Jean and JoAnn. He died on March 6, 1939, when his automobile struck a tree at the bottom of a hill in Canton, Ohio.
