= Gray Horse (disambiguation) =

Gray Horse may refer to:

- A gray horse
- Gray Horse, Oklahoma, unincorporated community in Oklahoma
- Gray Horse (American football), American football player
