= Bill Winneshiek =

Native American football player

Bill Winneshiek NahiSonwahika
No. 3, 8
- Position: Center / Guard

Personal information
- Born: December 24, 1894; Winnebago County, Iowa
- Died: September 15, 1949 (aged 56); Wilmington, Delaware
- Listed height: 5 ft 8 in (1.73 m)
- Listed weight: 180 lb (82 kg)

Career information
- College: Carlisle Indian

Career history
- Oorang Indians (1922)
- Stats at Pro Football Reference

William Phineus Winneshiek, also spelled Winneshick and referred to as NahiSonwahika (December 24, 1892 – September 15, 1949), was a professional football player who played in the National Football League during the 1922 season, at age 25. That season, he joined the NFL's Oorang Indians. The Indians were a team based in LaRue, Ohio, composed only of Native Americans, and coached by Jim Thorpe. Bill was a member of the Ho-Chunk or Winnebago tribe.

His father helped him to attend Carlisle Indian School in Pennsylvania from 1911 to 1915. He found friendship with Jim Thorpe and found his love for football. In addition to playing with the NFL, Bill was an Assistant Football Coach at Lebanon Valley College, a professional musician in Chief Winneshiek's All Indian Band, and traveled to the Antarctic with Admiral Byrd. He later married Marie Marguerite Zerbe, an elementary school teacher and local physician's daughter. The two had a son, named William Sherwood Winneshiek, who would later fly 49 B-17 missions over Germany during World War II and culminating his military as Director of Communications at NORAD in Colorado Springs, CO. They also had a daughter, Doris Winona Winneshiek who became a nurse and writer.
