= Nick Lassa =

American football player (1898–1964)

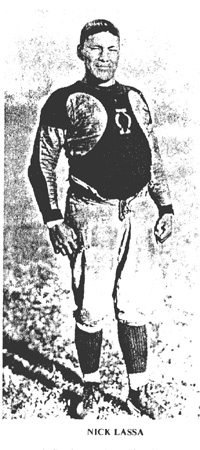

No. 14 (1922) 7 (1923)
- Positions: Tackle, center, guard, end

Personal information
- Born: July 11, 1898; Flathead Indian Reservation, Montana
- Died: September 4, 1964 (aged 66)
- Listed height: 5 ft 10 in (1.78 m)
- Listed weight: 205 lb (93 kg)

Career information
- High school: Carlisle Indian; Haskell Indian

Career history
- 1922–1923: Oorang Indians

Awards and highlights
- Wrestled a bear in one of the first ever halftime shows

Nicholas Anthony Lassa (July 11, 1898 – September 4, 1964), more popularly referred to as Long Time Sleep, was a professional American football player from the Flathead Indian Reservation in Montana.

== Biography ==
Born on July 11, 1898, Lassa was Native American and a member of the Pend d'Orielle tribe, one of three members of the confederated tribes of the Flathead reservation in Montana. He was given the name, Long Time Sleep, by his teammates because he was difficult to wake up in the morning.

Lassa attended and played college football at the Carlisle Indian School and Haskell Institute. Lassa eventually played in the National Football League in 1922 with the Oorang Indians.

The Oorang Indians were an all-Native American football team based in La Rue, Ohio and formed by Walter Lingo in 1922 to help promote his Airedale kennel. The team was organized by Jim Thorpe, who served the team as a player-coach. When the team formed, Lassa was the first player to arrive in La Rue.

Aside from football, Lassa enjoyed wrestling. He would make up to $50 (equivalent to $962 in 2025) for wrestling matches throughout the area. In fact he is most remembered for wrestling a bear as part of a halftime show of one of the Indians' games. Lassa would usually win $10–$20 (equivalent to $192–$385 in 2025) per match, which would allow the whole team to go out partying all night.

After the team folded in 1923, Lassa stayed near LaRue, earning his living as a professional wrestler and strongman. He also stayed on working for Lingo and several of the other farmers in the area. He finally left the area in the early 1930s. He reportedly gave up drinking, raised a family, and became a respected member of his community. Lassa died on September 4, 1964.
