= Reggie Attache =

American football player (1894–1955)

No. 6
- Position: Wingback / Fullback

Personal information
- Born: February 5, 1894; Temecula, Pechanga Indian Reservation, California, U.S.
- Died: June 22, 1955 (aged 61); Temecula, Pechanga Indian Reservation, California, U.S.
- Listed height: 5 ft 7 in (1.70 m)
- Listed weight: 195 lb (88 kg)

Career information
- College: Sherman Indian

Career history
- Oorang Indians (1922)
- Stats at Pro Football Reference

Reginald Edward Attache (February 5, 1894 – June 22, 1955), a.k.a. Laughing Gas, was a professional American football player who played in the National Football League (NFL) during the 1922 season for the Oorang Indians. The Indians were a team based in LaRue, Ohio, composed only of Native Americans and coached by Jim Thorpe.

Attache was a Mission Indian who grew up on the Pechanga Indian Reservation in Temecula, California. He attended Sherman Indian High School in Riverside, California, and played college football there.

== Bibliography ==
- Whitman, Robert L. (1984). Jim Thorpe and the Oorang Indians: The N.F.L.'s Most Colorful Franchise. Mount Gilead, Ohio: Marion County Historical Society. OCLC 717439558.
