= Lo Boutwell =

Native American football player (1892–1969)

No. 8, 11
- Position: Halfback / Fullback / Quarterback

Personal information
- Born: October 3, 1892; Orr, Grand Forks County, North Dakota
- Died: October 3, 1969 (aged 77); Columbus, Ohio
- Listed height: 5 ft 7 in (1.70 m)
- Listed weight: 188 lb (85 kg)

Career information
- High school: Mechanicsburg Academy (PA)
- College: Carlisle Indian

Career history
- Oorang Indians (1922–1923)

Leon A. Boutwell (October 3, 1892 – October 3, 1969) was a professional football player who played in the National Football League during the 1922 and 1923 seasons. He joined the NFL's Oorang Indians. The Indians were a team based in LaRue, Ohio, composed only of Native Americans, and coached by Jim Thorpe. Lo was a Chippewa and made his start with the team at age 29. He recorded an interception in 1923.

Boutwell attended high school at Mechanicsburg Academy, located in Mechanicsburg, Pennsylvania. After graduation, he played college football at the Carlisle Indian School.

When asked about how white audiences viewed the Indians, Boutwell explained:

"White people had this misconception about Indians. They thought they were all wild men, even though almost all of us had been to college and were generally more civilized than they were. Well, it was a dandy excuse to raise hell and get away with it when the mood struck us. Since we were Indians we could get away with things the whites couldn't. Don't think we didn't take advantage of it."
