= Stillwell Saunooke =

No. 12
- Position: End / Wingback

Personal information
- Born: September 1, 1891; Whittier, North Carolina, U.S.
- Listed height: 5 ft 8 in (1.73 m)
- Listed weight: 175 lb (79 kg)

Career information
- College: Carlisle Indian

Career history
- Oorang Indians (1922)
- Stats at Pro Football Reference

Stillwell Saunooke (September 1, 1891 – ?) was an American professional football player who played in the National Football League during the 1922 season. That season, he joined the NFL's Oorang Indians. The Indians were a team based in LaRue, Ohio, composed only of Native Americans, and coached by Jim Thorpe. Saunooke attend and played college football at the Carlisle Indian School located in Carlisle, Pennsylvania and was Eastern Band Cherokee. He is listed on the Baker Roll.
