= Xavier Downwind =

American football player (1893–1968)

Xavier "Red Fang" Downwind
No. 18
- Position: End / Tackle

Personal information
- Born: December 24, 1893; Red Lake Indian Reservation, Minnesota
- Died: July 26, 1968 (aged 74); Bemidji, Minnesota
- Listed height: 6 ft 0 in (1.83 m)
- Listed weight: 200 lb (91 kg)

Career information
- College: Carlisle Indian

Career history
- Oorang Indians (1922–1923)
- Stats at Pro Football Reference

Chief Xavier Downwind a.k.a. Red Fang (December 24, 1893 – July 26, 1968) was a professional football player who played in the National Football League during the 1922 and 1923 seasons. He played college football at the Carlisle Indian School, located in Carlisle, Pennsylvania, before joining the NFL's Oorang Indians. The Indians were a team based in LaRue, Ohio, composed only of Native Americans, and coached by Jim Thorpe. Downwind was a Chippewa.

== Family ==
The son of James Mayshuckkence Downwind, Xavier was married twice. First he married Katie Isabelle and who he had a child with in 1919, Paul Xavier Downwind. In the mid 1920s he married Rose Eliza Smith. Between 1927 and 1945, Xavier and Rose had seven children; Xavier Francis, Rupert, Herman, Winnifred, Ruth Arlean, Anna Margaret and Leo Harold Lee. He also has several grandchildren that reside in Minnesota.
