= Stan Powell =

American football player (1889–1957)

Stan "Wrinkle Meat" Powell
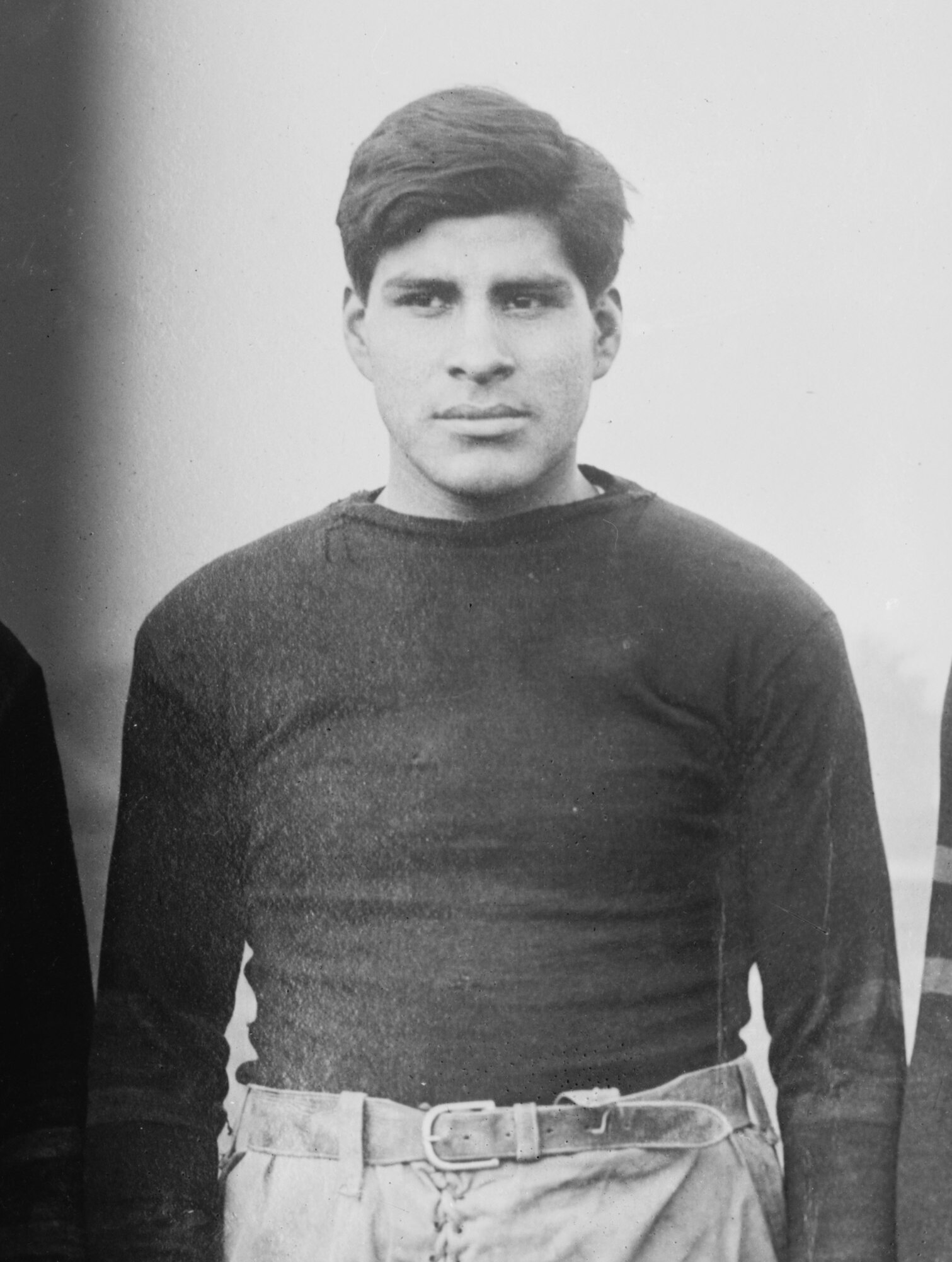

No. 9
- Position: Guard

Personal information
- Born: February 11, 1889; Cherokee, North Carolina, U.S.
- Died: October 14, 1957 (aged 68); Cherokee, North Carolina, U.S.
- Listed height: 5 ft 11 in (1.80 m)
- Listed weight: 185 lb (84 kg)

Career information
- College: Carlisle; Haskell Indian

Career history
- Oorang Indians (1923)
- Stats at Pro Football Reference

Stancil "Wrinkle Meat" Powell (February 11, 1889 – October 14, 1957) was a professional football player who played in the National Football League during the 1923 season. That season, he joined the NFL's Oorang Indians. The Indians were a team based in LaRue, Ohio, composed only of Native Americans, and coached by Jim Thorpe. Powell was an enrolled citizen of the Eastern Band of Cherokee Indians.
