= Jack Thorpe =

No. 28
- Position: Guard

Personal information
- Born: 1881
- Died: Unknown
- Listed height: 6 ft 0 in (1.83 m)
- Listed weight: 210 lb (95 kg)

Career history
- Oorang Indians (1923)
- Stats at Pro Football Reference

Jack Thorpe (born 1881) was a professional football player. Nicknamed Deadeye, he played eight games in the National Football League during the 1923 season with the Oorang Indians. The Indians were a team based in LaRue, Ohio, composed only of Native Americans, and coached by his brother, Jim Thorpe. Like Jim, Jack was a member of the Sac and Fox Nation.
