= Ted St. Germaine =

American football player, coach, and lawyer (1885–1947)

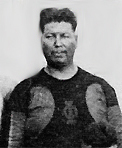
- 1922 photo of Jim Thorpe and Ted St. Germaine as teammates on the Oorang Indians football team

No. 24
- Positions: Tackle, center, guard

Personal information
- Born: February 2, 1885; Lac du Flambeau, Wisconsin, U.S.
- Died: October 4, 1947 (aged 62); Lac du Flambeau, Wisconsin, U.S.
- Listed height: 6 ft 2 in (1.88 m)
- Listed weight: 250 lb (113 kg)

Career information
- College: Yale

Career history
- Oorang Indians (1922)
- Stats at Pro Football Reference

Thomas Leo "Ted" St. Germaine (February 2, 1885 – October 4, 1947) was an American football player, coach, and lawyer. He served as the head football coach at Villanova College—now known as Villanova University—for one season, in 1913, compiling a record of 4–2–1. Germaine played professionally in the National Football League (NFL) during the 1922 season. That season, he joined the NFL's Oorang Indians, a team based in LaRue, Ohio, which was composed solely of Native Americans, and coached by Jim Thorpe. St. Germaine was qualified to play for the Indians since he was a Chippewa.

Germaine attended the University of Wisconsin, but found the atmosphere more friendly at Carlisle Indian Industrial School, located in Pennsylvania, where he played football and earned his bachelor's degree. He then furthered his education at Howard University and Yale Law School where, in 1913, he acquired a law degree. He returned to Lac du Flambeau to represent the Lake Superior Band of Chippewa in treaty rights cases and subsequently argued before the Wisconsin Supreme Court.

He was recruited to play for the Oorang Indians, in 1922, at the age of 37, by Jim Thorpe. He is believed to have been the first attorney at law to play for an NFL team.

After his football career ended, St. Germaine became a tribal judge and, in 1932, was the first Native-American admitted to the bar in Wisconsin. When United States President Franklin Roosevelt ended the Native-American assimilation policies, St. Germaine served as the spokesman for the Lac du Flambeau delegation at the Hayward, Wisconsin, hearings. At these hearings, St. Germaine argued for Indian self-government and tribal control of natural resources as stipulated in the treaties of the 19th century. Some of these concepts were incorporated into the Indian Reorganization Act of 1934. Germaine died of a heart attack in 1947.

== Head coaching record ==
Year	Team	Overall	Conference	Standing	Bowl/playoffs
Villanova Wildcats (Independent) (1913)
1913	Villanova	4–2–1			
Villanova:		4–2–1			
Total:		4–2–1			
