= Napoleon Barrel =

American football player (1885–1964)

No. 20
- Position: Center / Cornerback

Personal information
- Born: December 25, 1885; Richwood, Minnesota, U.S.
- Died: December 1, 1964 (aged 78); Gaylord, Michigan, U.S.
- Listed height: 5 ft 8 in (1.73 m)
- Listed weight: 200 lb (91 kg)

Career information
- College: Carlisle Indian

Career history
- Oorang Indians (1923)
- Stats at Pro Football Reference

Napoleon Paul Barrel (December 25, 1885 – December 1, 1964) was a professional football player. He played seven games in the National Football League (NFL) during the 1923 season, at age 37, with the Oorang Indians. The Indians were a team based in LaRue, Ohio, composed only of Native Americans, and coached by Jim Thorpe. Barrel was a member of the Chippewas.
