= Dick Deer Slayer =

American football player

Profile
- Position: End

Personal information
- Born: United States
- Listed weight: 190 lb (86 kg)

Career information
- College: None

Career history
- Oorang Indians (1922)

Career statistics
- Games played: 2
- Stats at Pro Football Reference

Dick Deer Slayer was a professional football player who played in the early National Football League. A Native American, Dick played for the Oorang Indians during the 1922 season. The Indians were a team composed only of Native American players and based in La Rue, Ohio. The team, more notable for its halftime and pre-game shows than its playing ability, was in existence for only two seasons. Deer Slayer left the team, and the league, after playing in just two games in 1922.
