= Eagle feather =

Eagle Feather may refer to:

- The feather of an eagle.
- Eagle feather law in the United States.
- A short story by Habib Ahmadzadeh about the civilian resistance against the Iraqi siege of the southern Iranian city of Abadan during the Iran–Iraq War (1980–88).
- Eagle Feather, a football player
- Eagle Feather, a 2025 album by country musician Ian Munsick
