= Laddie Boy =

Airedale Terrier owned by Warren G. Harding

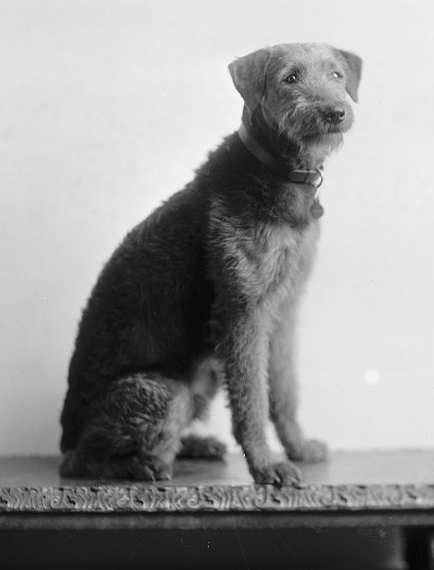
- Species: Canis lupus familiaris
- Breed: Airedale Terrier
- Sex: Male
- Born: July 26, 1920
- Died: January 23, 1929 (aged 8)
- Owners: Warren G. Harding; Harry Barker

Laddie Boy (July 26, 1920 – January 23, 1929) was an Airedale Terrier owned by U.S. President Warren G. Harding. He was born in Toledo, Ohio. His father was Champion Tintern Tip Top. He was presented to Harding by Charles Quetschke of Caswell Kennels and became a celebrity during the Harding administration.

Laddie Boy was a faithful dog. When the president played golf and hit a tree, Laddie Boy would run up to the tree and retrieve the ball. Laddie Boy had his own hand-carved chair to sit in during Cabinet meetings. The White House held birthday parties for Laddie Boy, invited other neighborhood dogs to join, and served them dog biscuit cake. Newspapers published mock interviews with Laddie Boy, who also had a caretaker.

Laddie Boy was the first pet to be known as "First Dog" and first to be regularly covered in the national press. Harding and his wife Florence shared a love of animals and the First Lady, also an advocate for the care of abused and neglected animals, soon began employing Laddie Boy as a poster child for the national promotion of animal rights issues.

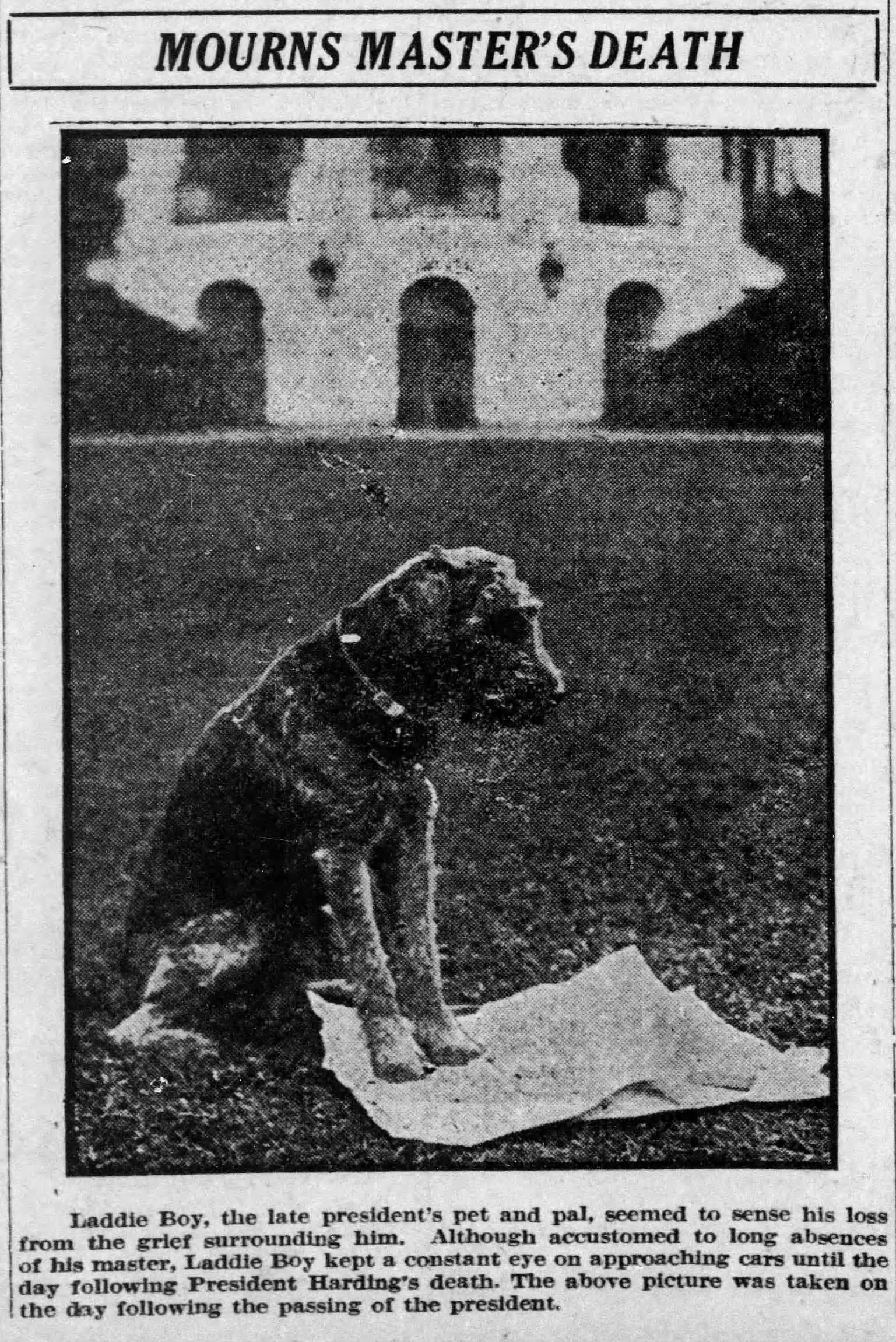
Laddie Boy mourning the death of President Harding

Laddie Boy purportedly howled constantly for three days prior to President Harding's death in August 1923, at the Palace Hotel in San Francisco, knowing of his master's imminent demise. In memory of President Harding and honoring his former employment as a paperboy, newsboys collected 19,134 pennies to be remelted and sculpted into a statue of Laddie Boy. Harding's widow died before the statue was completed in 1927 and the statue was presented to the Smithsonian Institution. Harding's death and Laddie Boy were commemorated in song.

After the president's death in 1923, Florence gave Laddie Boy to her favorite Secret Service agent Harry Barker, as she knew her poor health would not allow her to look after Laddie Boy properly. Barker took Laddie Boy home to his family in Boston, where Laddie Boy lived a normal life and was loved by the Barker family. Laddie Boy's death in 1929 was proclaimed in newspaper headlines across the country.

Laddie is immortalized in bronze along Harding in Rapid City, South Dakota, as part of its "City of Presidents" art installation of presidential statues.

In 2012, Laddie Boy's unique collar, fashioned from Alaskan gold nuggets, was stolen from the Harding Home and Museum.

== See also ==
- United States presidential pets
- List of individual dogs
