= Woodchuck Welmas =

American football player (1891–1968)

No. 14
- Position: End

Personal information
- Born: February 26, 1891; California, United States
- Died: November 15, 1968 (aged 77); Riverside County, California
- Listed height: 5 ft 7 in (1.70 m)
- Listed weight: 180 lb (82 kg)

Career information
- College: Carlisle Indian

Career history
- Oorang Indians (1923)
- Stats at Pro Football Reference

Philip J. "Woodchuck" Welmas (February 26, 1891 - November 15, 1968) was a Native American professional football player in the early National Football League. He was Cupeño from the Pala Reservation in San Diego County, California. Cupeño is Cahuilla and Luiseño mixed.

Welmas played in four games in the NFL with the Oorang Indians which Jim Thorpe was the coach for the 1923 season. He ended his professional career after the Indians disbanded in 1923.

Welmas attended college and played college football at the Carlisle Indian School in Carlisle, Pennsylvania.
