= Sherman Indian High School =

- Sherman Institute, c. 1920s

Location
- 9010 Magnolia Avenue; Riverside, California 92503; United States; 33.9225°N 117.4342°W

Information
- School type: Secondary
- Established: 1892
- Authority: Bureau of Indian Education
- Teaching staff: 4.00 (FTE)
- Grades: 9–12
- Gender: Male and Female
- Enrollment: 340 (2023-2024)
- Student to teacher ratio: 85.00
- Schedule: Block Schedule
- Campus: Resident
- Colors: Purple and Gold
- Slogan: Home of the Braves
- Athletics: Football, Baseball, Cross-Country, Track and Field, Basketball
- Athletics conference: CIF - Southern Section; Arrowhead League
- Mascot: Braves
- Website: sih.bie.edu

Sherman Indian High School (SIHS) is an off-reservation boarding high school for Native Americans. Originally opened in 1892 as the Perris Indian School, in Perris, California, the school was relocated to Riverside, California, in 1903, under the name Sherman Institute. When the school was accredited by the Western Association of Schools and Colleges in 1971, it became known as Sherman Indian High School.

Operated by the Bureau of Indian Education/Bureau of Indian Affairs and the United States Department of the Interior, the school serves grades 9 through 12. The school mascot is the Brave and the school colors are purple and yellow. There are seven dormitory facilities on the SIHS grounds. The male facilities are Wigwam, Ramona, and Kiva. Female facilities are Wauneka, Dawaki, and Winona. The last dorm is a transition dorm, Hogan. In addition to the seven dorms, there is also a set of 13 honor apartments named Sunset. Only four dorms are available for students to live in including Wigwam, Ramona, Wauneka and Winona.

== History ==
According to the Sherman Indian Museum, SIHS was founded by the United States government in order to assimilate Native Americans into white American society.

SIHS was originally known as the Perris Indian School, which was established in 1892 under the direction of Mr. M. S. Savage. This was the first off-reservation boarding school in California. The enrollment then consisted of Southern California Indian children from the Tule River Agency to San Diego County. Students ranged in age from 5 years old to early 20s. The main subjects taught were agriculture and domestic science.

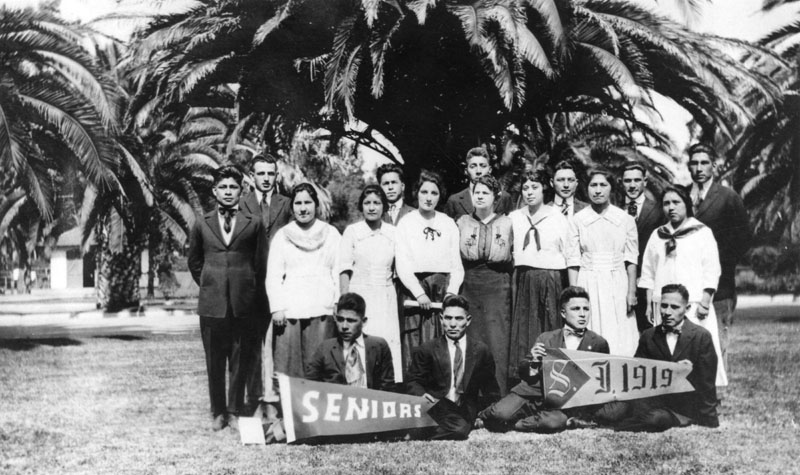
Class photo of graduating seniors at the Sherman Institute, 1919.

The 80-acre (320,000 m^{2}) site in Perris, California, was at the corner of today's Perris Boulevard and Morgan Street. Due to an inadequate water supply to conduct the primary subjects at the school, a better location was sought. By 1901 a site in the city of Riverside was selected, at the corner of Magnolia Avenue and Jackson Street. On July 19, 1901, the cornerstone was laid for the new school building of Sherman Institute. Perris Indian School remained in operation until December 1904 when the remaining students were transferred to Riverside. It was named after Congressman James S. Sherman, who helped establish funding for the school in 1900.

The Mission Revival Style architecture was considered a novelty when the school was built, and the city promoted the school as one of the landmarks to visit by tourists. To meet earthquake standards, most of the original school buildings were demolished during the 1970s, and new structures were built in their place. The California Native Tribes were required to pay for the demolition and for the new buildings.

During the 2008–09 school year, SIHS administration removed more than 30 staff from their facility, upsetting the students. The students protested, to no effect. Officials stated that there were not enough Bureau of Indian Affairs (BIA) funds to pay the employees that had been let go.

== Sherman Indian Museum ==
The Sherman Indian Museum, located on the campus is housed in the school's original administration building. This building was designated as Riverside Cultural Heritage Landmark Number 16 in 1974 and was added to the National Register of Historic Places in 1980.

The museum preserves and exhibits the history of the Sherman Institute and its students, many of whom came from Native communities across the United States. Its collection includes over 2,000 cataloged items of Native American origin, such as photographs, documents, and artifacts donated by former students, their families, and friends of the school.

The museum oversees the Sherman School Names Project, which aims to honor and remember the individual students who attended Sherman by compiling and publishing their names, home communities, and tribal affiliations. This project seeks to humanize the school's history by highlighting the individuality of the students, serving as a resource for historians, genealogists, and descendants seeking to understand or reclaim their connections to Sherman.

The museum also offers educational programs, including lectures and workshops on the history of boarding schools, federal education policy toward Native Americans, and the experiences of American Indians who attended off-reservation boarding schools. These programs aim to educate the public about the complex history of Native American education policies in the United States and provide a space for remembrance, learning, and cultural preservation.

In 1995 Huell Howser Productions, in association with KCET/Los Angeles, featured Sherman Indian High School in California's Gold.

== Sherman Cemetery ==
The Sherman Indian School Cemetery, located on Indiana Avenue serves as the burial site for at least 67 Native American students who died between 1904 and 1955. Most of these students died from diseases while others perished due to accidents at the school, reflecting the health crises and hazardous conditions common in boarding schools during this period.

Students who died were often buried on school grounds rather than returned to their families, primarily due to lack of funding for transportation or repatriation, a practice typical of off-reservation boarding schools. The cemetery occupies approximately half an acre today, although historical records suggest it may have originally covered up to one acre before parts were lost to later campus development. Most graves are marked with simple headstones, but deterioration over time has made some markers difficult to read, raising concerns about possible unmarked graves within the site.

After years of neglect, the cemetery was reestablished as a site of remembrance in 2002 when the school’s Inter-Tribal Council revived the tradition of "Indian Flower Day," an annual ceremony held on May 3. During this event, students and community members decorate the graves with flowers to honor those who died at the school. Today, the cemetery continues to serve as both a memorial space and an educational resource for students, who participate in ceremonies that reflect on the school’s complex history.

== Demographics and feeder patterns ==
As of 2023 students living on Indian reservations make up about 68% of the student body.

As of 1988, Sherman Indian high school was the most common boarding school chosen by the isolated village of Supai, Arizona, which has Havasupai Elementary School as its elementary school. Supai does not have a high school.

== Annual events ==
Sherman Indian High School hosts an annual intertribal Powwow typically held in April, this event brings together students, alumni, and members of the Native American community to celebrate cultural traditions. The powwow features competitive dance events, bird singing, and the participation of local vendors. It is open to the public and serves as a major cultural event for the school and surrounding communities.

Held the evening before the pow-wow, the Miss Sherman Pageant is a longstanding tradition organized by the school's Inter-Tribal Council. It began in 1986 and features categories such as traditional regalia presentation, talent performance, formal attire, and speech. Miss Sherman serves as the school's Cultural Ambassador, representing Sherman Indian High School at official events and assisting in planning cultural activities throughout the year. Candidates must be students in good academic and behavioral standing and have attended the school for at least one year.

== Notable faculty and alumni ==
- Reggie Attache, professional American football player, attended SIHS
- Pete Busch (1889–1949), professional American football player, attended from 1907–1910
- Jean Fredericks, photographer, attended after receiving grade school education on the Third Mesa Hopi Reservation
- Matthew B. Juan, SIHS graduate, Native American hero of World War I, killed in action
- "Big Chief" Russell Moore, jazz trombonist, graduated 1933
- Bemus Pierce, professional American football player, coached Sherman Braves in 1902 and 1903

== See also ==
- Saint Boniface Indian School, in Banning, California
- American Indian outing programs
