= Gladys Milligan =

American painter

- Born: 1892; LaRue, Ohio
- Died: 1973 (aged 80–81); Tryon, North Carolina
- Known for: Painting

Gladys Milligan (1892 — 1973) was an American painter.

== Biography ==
Born in LaRue, Ohio, McMillan attended the Western College for Women and Westminster College in Pennsylvania. She then studied under George Luks and Hans Hofmann and at the Pratt Institute before traveling to Paris for further instruction with André Lhote and at the Fontainebleau School of Art. She is known to have been active in Washington, D.C. at least as early as 1931, continuing her activities there until at least 1967. Beginning in 1931, for over twenty years she taught painting and art history at the National Cathedral School, from which she retired in 1955. Long a member of the Arts Club of Washington, she had one-woman shows there in 1938 and 1947. Other solo shows occurred at George Washington University and at the Studio Gallery in New York City. She also belonged to the Society of Washington Artists, at whose 1932 exhibition she presented an oil titled Taos, New Mexico, and th Washington Water Color Club, and she exhibited with both the National Association of Women Artists and the National Association of Women Painters and Sculptors during her career. An article which she penned about the Society of Washington Artists was published in 1963 by the Columbia Historical Society. Milligan eventually moved to Tryon, North Carolina to join the artists' colony there. She died in Tryon; her body was returned to Ohio for burial, and rests in the Bellefontaine City Cemetery in Bellefontaine.

Milligan worked in oil, pastel, and watercolor during her career, producing landscapes, portraits, and still lifes. A 1948 oil-on-canvas still-life is currently owned by the Phillips Collection in Washington, D.C. A 1972 portrait of Abby Merchant, an acquaintance from the Tryon artists' colony, is currently in the Polk County Historical Museum in Tryon. She is also represented in the collection of the New Mexico Museum of Art.
