= War Eagle (American football) =

Native American football player

No. 26
- Position: Tackle

Personal information
- Born: Unknown
- Died: Unknown
- Listed height: 5 ft 9 in (1.75 m)
- Listed weight: 195 lb (88 kg)

Career information
- High school: Flandreau Indian (ND)
- College: None

Career history
- Oorang Indians (1922)

War Eagle was the name of a Native American professional football player. He played five games in the National Football League during the 1922 season with the Oorang Indians.
