= Jean Fredericks =

Hopi photographer and politician (1906–1990)

- Born: April 30, 1906; Old Oraibi, Arizona
- Died: October 11, 1990 (aged 84); Arizona
- Education: Sherman Indian High School
- Known for: Photography
- Elected: Chairman, Hopi Tribe

Jean Fredericks (1906–1990) was a Hopi photographer. He grew up in Old Oraibi, Arizona, a village located on Third Mesa on the Hopi Reservation.

== Biography ==
Fredericks attended grade school on the reservation. He later attended the Sherman Indian High School in Riverside, California, which was then called Sherman Indian Boarding School. After graduation, he worked as a mechanic on and off his reservation. He then served in the U.S. Army. In the 1960s, he was elected as chairman of the Hopi Tribe.

== Photography ==
Fredericks purchased his first 35mm camera in 1941. He built a dark room in his house to develop his photographs. He became one of the first Hopis to take photographs on the reservation. His photography collection consists of candid and posed photographs of family members and his community on the reservation. He also focused on documentary images, which have become valuable assets to the history of life on the Hopi Reservation.

In an artist statement, Fredericks stated, "I have been taking pictures, mostly of friends and family, since the 1940s. Privately, many Hopis approve of photography and want pictures of their families and celebrations, just like anyone else. Publicly, many feel they have to adopt a political position against photography, to be careful of what they say or what others will say about them. This is to protect their privacy. Personally, I am glad people are interested in my photographs and that my hobby will help people better understand the Hopis."
