= Eagle Feather =

American football player (1895–1950)

No. 32
- Position: Fullback / Halfback / Tackle

Personal information
- Born: May 7, 1895; Irving, New York, U.S.
- Died: March 10, 1950 (aged 54); Irving, New York, U.S.
- Listed height: 6 ft 0 in (1.83 m)
- Listed weight: 220 lb (100 kg)

Career information
- College: Carlisle

Career history
- Oorang Indians (1922–1923)
- Stats at Pro Football Reference

Beamus Pierce aka Eagle Feather (May 7, 1895 – March 10, 1950) was a professional football player who played in the National Football League during the 1922 and 1923 seasons. He played college football at the Carlisle Indian School, located in Carlisle, Pennsylvania, before joining the NFL's Oorang Indians. The Indians were a team based in LaRue, Ohio, composed only of Native Americans, and coached by Jim Thorpe. Eagle Feather was a Mohican.

On October 8, 1922, Eagle Feather and teammate Joe Guyon made history by making the Indians the first-team with two 100-yard rushers in one game. That game Guyon ran for 116 yards and 2 touchdowns off of 13 carries. Meanwhile, Eagle Feather ran for 109 yards on 16 carries for 1 touchdown as the Indians beat the Columbus Panhandles 20–6. During that game Eagle Feather's runs up the middle of the field were referred to as the main feature of the Oorang offense. He also served the team as a blocking back for Guyon in 13–6 loss to the Minneapolis Marines.
