= Bob Hill (American football) =

American football player (1891–1942)

No. 7, 9
- Position: Guard

Personal information
- Born: April 2, 1892; Smethport, Pennsylvania
- Died: December 28, 1942 (aged 50); Niagara Falls, New York
- Listed height: 5 ft 11 in (1.80 m)
- Listed weight: 190 lb (86 kg)

Career information
- College: Carlisle

Career history
- Oorang Indians (1922)
- Stats at Pro Football Reference

Robert Haskell Hill (April 2, 1892 – December 28, 1942), aka War Horse, was a professional football player who played in the National Football League during the 1922 season. That season, he joined the NFL's Oorang Indians. The Indians were a team based in Marion, Ohio, composed only of Native Americans, and coached by Jim Thorpe. Hill was a member of the Mohawks.
