= Big Bear (American football) =

Native American NFL player (1889–1959)

No. 32, 26, 28
- Position: Tackle

Personal information
- Born: December 25, 1889; Winnebago, Nebraska
- Died: December 21, 1959 (aged 69); Winnebago, Nebraska
- Listed height: 6 ft 4 in (1.93 m)
- Listed weight: 215 lb (98 kg)

Career information
- College: Carlisle Indian

Career history
- Oorang Indians (1922–1923)

Samuel Big Bear (December 25, 1889 - December 21, 1959), mainly referred to as simply Big Bear in the record books, was a Native American professional football player during the early years of the National Football League. During his two-year career, Big Bear played in 6 games with the Oorang Indians. He played in 1 game for the 1922 season and in 5 games for the 1923 season. He ended his professional career after the Indians disbanded in 1923. According to NFL records, Big Bear did not attend college or play college football. However, the Pro Football Researchers Association states that he attended the Carlisle Indian School located in Carlisle, Pennsylvania.
