= Edgar Bain =

American metallurgist (1891–1971)

Edgar Collins Bain (September 14, 1891 – November 27, 1971) was an American metallurgist and member of the National Academy of Sciences, who worked for the US Steel Corporation of Pittsburgh, Pennsylvania. He worked on the alloying and heat treatment of steel; Bainite is named in his honor.

He was born near LaRue, Ohio to Milton Henry (of Scottish descent) and Alice Anne Collins Bain. He graduated with a B.S. from Ohio State University in 1912. He received his M.S. in 1916 and his Ph.D. in 1919 both from Ohio State. His written works include Functions of the Alloying Elements in Steel, published by ASM International. He died on November 27, 1971, in Edgeworth, Pennsylvania.

He was elected in 1923 a Fellow of the American Physical Society.
