= Ted Buffalo =

American football player (1901–1969)

No. 18
- Position: Offensive Lineman

Personal information
- Born: May 11, 1901; Red Cliff, Wisconsin
- Died: August 19, 1969 (aged 67); Washburn, Wisconsin
- Listed height: 6 ft 0 in (1.83 m)
- Listed weight: 190 lb (86 kg)

Career information
- College: Haskell Institute

Career history
- Oorang Indians (1923)
- Stats at Pro Football Reference

William "Ted" Francis Buffalo (November 5, 1901 – August 19, 1969) was a professional football player who played in the National Football League during the 1923 season.

== Biography ==
Buffalo was born in Red Cliff, Wisconsin, and attended Haskell Institute (now Haskell Indian Nations University). In 1923, he joined the NFL's Oorang Indians, a team based in LaRue, Ohio which was composed of only Native Americans. The team was coached by Jim Thorpe. Buffalo played one season in the NFL. He was a Chippewa and 23 years old when he joined the team.

He died on August 19, 1969, in Washburn, Wisconsin.
