= Gray Horse (American football) =

Native American football player

No. 10, 30, 5
- Position: Guard / Halfback / Wingback

Personal information
- Listed height: 5 ft 8 in (1.73 m)
- Listed weight: 190 lb (86 kg)

Career information
- College: None

Career history
- Oorang Indians (1923)
- Stats at Pro Football Reference

Gray Horse was a professional football player who played in the National Football League during the 1923 season. That season, he joined the NFL's Oorang Indians. The Indians were a team based in LaRue, Ohio, composed only of Native Americans, and coached by Jim Thorpe. Gray Horse was a Chippewa.

On November 4, 1923, against the Chicago Bears, Gray Horse fumbled the football which was picked up by the Bears' George Halas and ran back for a 98-yard touchdown. This set the record for the longest touchdown run with a fumble.
