= Bill Newashe =

American football player (1889–1962)

No. 24
- Position: Tackle

Personal information
- Born: October 5, 1889; Shawnee, Oklahoma, United States
- Died: February 8, 1962 (aged 72); Luther, Oklahoma
- Listed height: 5 ft 11 in (1.80 m)
- Listed weight: 200 lb (91 kg)

Career information
- College: Carlisle Indian School

Career history
- 1914: Wabash A.A.
- 1915-1916: Detroit Heralds
- 1916: Pitcairn Quakers
- 1923: Oorang Indians
- Stats at Pro Football Reference

William O. Newashe (October 5, 1889 – February 8, 1962) was a Native American athlete who played professional football. Newashe, a member of the Sac and Fox Nation, played five games in the National Football League during the 1923 season with the Oorang Indians, alongside fellow Nation member and athlete Jim Thorpe.

Newashe grew up on the Sac and Fox Nation in Indian Territory (now the state of Oklahoma located in the U.S.). He attended the Carlisle Indian Industrial School in Carlisle, Pennsylvania, entering the school on July 5, 1903, and leaving for the last time on December 3, 1911. This was the last time he officially left the school; he had departed several times between these dates. Reasons for his departure included the football season concluding to a report that he left to be a professional baseball player for a team in Hershey, Pennsylvania. He also played other sports well at school, including basketball, track (competing in the hammer throw), and baseball, with baseball being a favorite as the reports of professional baseball stayed constant, with a correspondence in 1916 stating he played for the Carlisle Indian Baseball Team.

Football continued to be Newashe's main sport however, as he regularly competed on his school's team. He played guard and tackle throughout his time at Carlisle, being an integral part of their 1911/1912 season, which saw them complete a 7-1 season, including a 18-15 win over Harvard University, a national powerhouse at the time. He continued his playing career into the professional space, playing with the Wabash A.A (1914), Detroit Heralds (1915-1916), Pitcairn Quakers (1916), and finally competing in the NFL with the Oorang Indians during the 1923 season. On both of these teams, Oorang and Carlise, he teamed up with future Olympic gold medalist Jim Thorpe, with their connection leading to Newashe serving as a pall bearer at Thorpe's death.

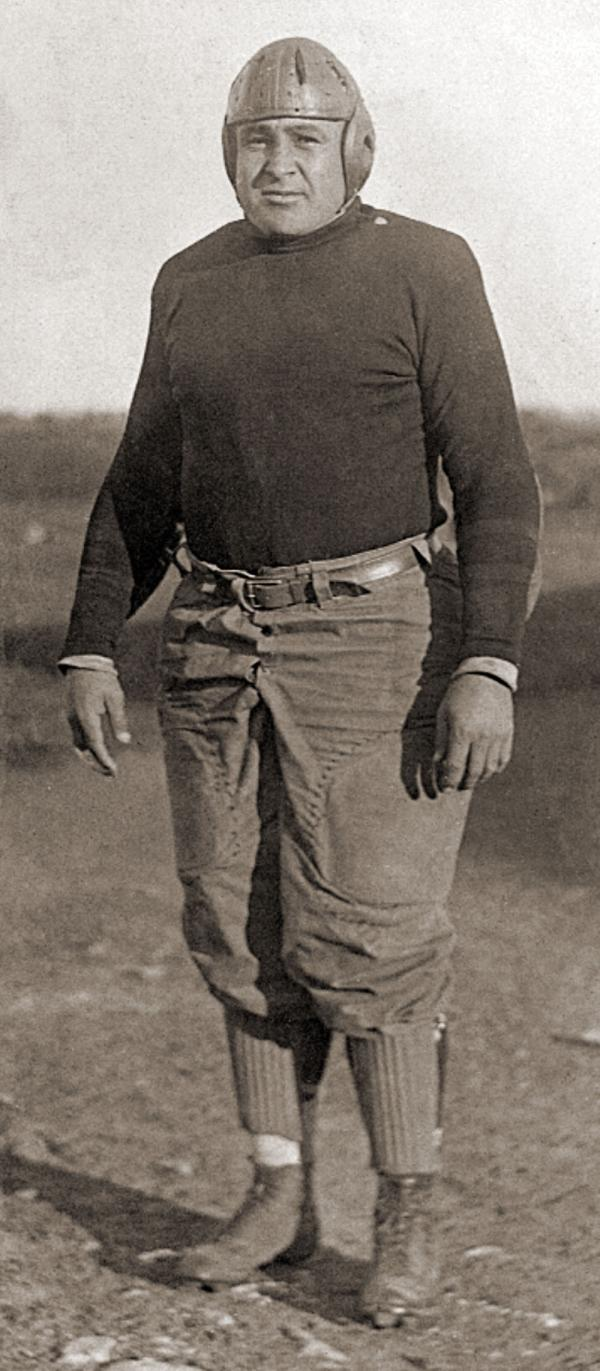
William Newashe playing football at Carlisle Indian School -1911

He was married to Myrtle Cowan. They had a daughter, Suzanne Newashe Underwood, who was the mother to Rebecca Lea Lewis Dean. He had a sister, Emma Newashe, who was the grandmother to Donna Newashe McAllister. Bill was a Native American and a member of the Sac and Fox nation.
