= Oorang Indians =

Traveling team in the National Football League from LaRue, Ohio

Logo

General information
- Founded: 1922
- Folded: 1923
- Stadium: Traveling Team
- Headquartered: LaRue, Ohio, United States
- Colors: Burgundy, gold, white
- Mascot: Walter Lingo's Airedale Dogs

Personnel
- Owner: Walter Lingo
- General manager: Jim Thorpe
- Head coach: Jim Thorpe

Team history
- Oorang Indians (1922–23)

League / conference affiliations
- National Football League

The Oorang Indians (/ˈuːræŋ/) were a traveling team in the National Football League from LaRue, Ohio (near Marion). The franchise was a novelty team put together by Walter Lingo to market his Oorang (Airedale Terrier) dog kennels. All of the Indians players were Native American, with Jim Thorpe serving as its leading player and coach. The team played in the National Football League in 1922 and 1923. Of the 20 games they played over two seasons, only one was played at "home" in nearby Marion. With a population well under a thousand people, LaRue remains the smallest town ever to have been the home of an NFL franchise, or any professional team in any league in the United States.

== History ==
=== Beginnings ===
In 1919 Oorang Kennel owner, Walter Lingo, met and became friends with Jim Thorpe of the Canton Bulldogs, a future Pro Football Hall of Famer who was considered the greatest athlete of his time. Lingo had a deep passion for the Airedales, which he raised, and for Native American culture. LaRue, Ohio, was once the site of an old Wyandot village and Lingo believed that a supernatural bond existed between the Indians and the Airedales. Thorpe first came to Lingo's defense after neighboring farmers accused Lingo's Oorang Kennels of raising "a nation of sheep killers". Thorpe came to Lingo's aid by testifying that he once knew an Oorang Airedale that had saved the life of a 6-year-old girl, named Mabel, from being trampled by a bull. Afterwards, Lingo and Thorpe became friends and soon began hunting together.

1922–1923 Oorang Indians letterhead

In 1921, Lingo invited Thorpe and Pete Calac, who was a teammate of Thorpe's at the Carlisle Indian School in Pennsylvania, to his plantation in LaRue to hunt for opossum. It was on this trip that the men agreed on a way to both advertise Airedales and to employ Thorpe, who after dominating the Ohio League for much of the late 1910s was no longer to lead his Canton Bulldogs to championships in a broader national league. Lingo would purchase a franchise in the young National Football League, and Thorpe would run the team. At the time, the cost of purchasing an NFL franchise was $100 (equivalent to $1,923 in 2025). Meanwhile, just one of Lingo's Airedales sold for $150 (equivalent to $2,885 in 2025). Lingo saw the idea of a franchise as a way of touring the country's leading cities for the express purpose of advertising his Airedales. Therefore, he placed two conditions on the team. The first was that Thorpe had to field an all-Indian team. Secondly, Lingo wanted the team to help run his kennels in addition to playing football. Thorpe and Calac agreed to both terms. Finally, Thorpe would be paid $500 a week (equivalent to $9,617 in 2025) to coach, play, and manage the kennels.

In June 1922, Lingo, who also served as the team's business manager, traveled to Canton, Ohio, and purchased an NFL franchise for $100 (equivalent to $1,923 in 2025). He named his team the Oorang Indians, after his kennels and favorite breed of dog. The name stood out to sports and dog fans alike. Lingo originally wanted the team to play out of LaRue, but that was hard to justify since the small town was missing a football field. The issue led to the club performing almost exclusively on the road as a traveling team, where it could draw the biggest crowds and best advertise the dogs. However, Thorpe and Lingo also felt that it would be nice to keep the Indians at home once or twice a year. The nearest town with a suitable football field was Marion, Ohio, which served as the location for the Indians' "home" games. The players would be in a constant state of travel week after week to many of the major cities in the country; such traveling teams were a regular part of professional football, which had a tradition of barnstorming, through its early existence. However, despite the hectic schedule, Lingo later insisted that the Indians received the very best of care. The same dieticians and the same trainer who fed his Airedales and cared for their well-being also tended to the Indian team members.

=== Fielding the team ===
"White people had this misconception about Indians. They thought they were all wild men, even though almost all of us had been to college and were generally more civilized than they were. Well, it was a dandy excuse to raise hell and get away with it when the mood struck us. Since we were Indians we could get away with things the whites couldn't. Don't think we didn't take advantage of it."

— Leon Boutwell, Oorang Indians Quarterback, when asked if he felt that the team exploited Native-Americans

Jim Thorpe served as a player-coach and recruited players for the team. In keeping with Lingo's wishes that franchise be an all-Indian team, Indians from all over the United States traveled to LaRue to try out for the team. Many of the prospects were from Thorpe's alma mater, the Carlisle Indian School. Several of the candidates looking to make the team had not played in years and were older than 40. While many of the members of the team were not full-blooded Indians—Thorpe himself was three-eighths Irish—every identifiable team member has proved to have at least some Indian blood. The Oorang Indians consisted of members who were Cherokee, Mohawk, Chippewa, Blackfeet, Winnebago, Mission, Caddo, Flathead, Sac and Fox, Seneca, and Penobscot. The team roster included such colorful names as Long Time Sleep, Dick Deer Slayer, Woodchuck Welmas, Joe Little Twig, Big Bear, and War Eagle. The team also had four former Carlisle Indians football captains in Thorpe, Joe Guyon, Pete Calac, and Elmer Busch and the Indians' trainer was John Morrison, reportedly the first Carlisle captain.

Walter Lingo's son Bob later recalled that the team practiced every day, depending on the workload at the dog kennel. However, training for an NFL season was only a secondary mission for the players. They did everything at the dog kennels, from training the dogs to building crates to ship them in. They kept in good physical condition, which was more important than an actual practice. Bob Lingo also stated that several of the team's plays were made up on the spot, similar to the play-calling in a sandlot football game.

=== The 1922 season ===
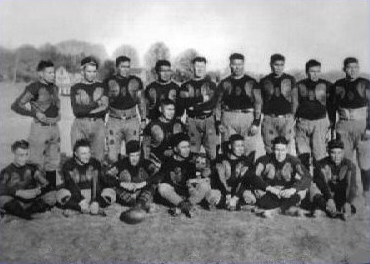
1922 Oorang Indians

The Indians had two future Hall of Famers on the roster, Thorpe and Joe Guyon. However, they did not play much. Thorpe was confined to coaching on the sidelines through most of the first half of the 1922 season and never played more than a half afterward. Guyon did not join the team until midway through the 1922 season. Pete Calac, who won several "Ohio League" titles with Thorpe and the Canton Bulldogs, was still suffering from career-threatening wounds from fighting in France during World War I.

The Indians began their season with a 3–2 record in their first 5 five games. Both of the team's losses came against NFL opponents, the Canton Bulldogs and the Dayton Triangles. Two of their victories came against independent teams and one in the NFL, the perennially bottom-dwelling Columbus Panhandles. One of those games against an independent team, the Indianapolis Belmonts, was played in a snowstorm. The Indians defeated the Belmonts, 33–0, taking home $2,000 (equivalent to $38,469 in 2025) in profits along with a Cherokee tackle named Chief Johnson, whom Thorpe recruited at halftime. A week later the Indians were defeated 62–0 (a “scorigami”, as this has not been the final score of an NFL game since) by the Akron Pros. The team then lost their next three games, all against league opponents: the Minneapolis Marines 13–6, the Chicago Bears 33–6, and the Milwaukee Badgers 13–0. The team did rebound to win their next two games, which were against league opponents, an upset over the Buffalo All-Americans 19–7, and a rematch with Columbus 18–6. However, their last two games ended in losses against independent teams, to finish with a 3–6 record (5–8 overall).

==== First-ever halftime shows ====
Rather than retiring to the locker room at halftime, the Oorang Indians showed Lingo's Airedales to the crowd. It was debatable, though, whether the Indians were there to play football or give Airedale exhibitions at halftime. In addition to the exhibitions with the dogs, the Indians, including Thorpe, participated in helping the Oorang Airedales perform tricks for the crowd. However, it was their halftime entertainment that made them such a huge attraction in the early 1920s. There were shooting exhibitions with the dogs retrieving the targets. There were Indian dances and tomahawk and knife-throwing demonstrations. Thorpe had a history of repeatedly drop kicking footballs through the uprights from midfield. Indians player Nick Lassa (also called "Long-Time-Sleep") even wrestled a bear on occasion.

==== Off-field behavior ====
A December 6, 1923 cartoon in the Baltimore News illustrating the media's perception of the team.

The Indians players knew that Lingo's only goal was to advertise his Airedales and that winning football games wasn't important to him. Therefore, the players spent a lot of their free time partying and drinking. In 1922, the night before a game with the Chicago Bears, the Indians went to a Chicago bar called "Everyman's Saloon." At 2:00 a.m., the bartender stopped serving drinks since Illinois law prohibited the sale of alcohol after 2 a.m. This action upset the Indians players, who stuffed the bartender in a telephone booth and turned it upside down. The Indians lost to the Bears 33–6 just a few hours later. Another instance occurred in November 1923 in St. Louis (as the Indians were in town for a game against the All-Stars), when several of the Indians went out drinking for the night. As the night came to an end, the players decided it was time to return to their hotel. They soon found a trolley that could take them back to their rooms; however, that particular trolley was headed in the opposite direction. To solve this problem, the Indians players reportedly picked up the trolley, and turned it around on the tracks. They then told the conductor the address for their hotel.

Another reason for the team's lack of success, according to Ed Healey, a Hall of Fame tackle for the Chicago Bears, was that Thorpe was not a good coach, especially where discipline was concerned. However, Healey insisted the players were "tough S.O.B.'s, but good guys off the field."

=== The 1923 season ===
The Indians played in the NFL again for the 1923 season, but the team that was fielded was weaker than the one from the year prior. While many of the players had moments of great play, the 1923 Indians were anchored by Thorpe, Guyon, and Calac, though those three players were constantly missing from the line-up due to injury. Guyon did not play until the eighth game of the season against the Canton Bulldogs, and Thorpe suffered a season-ending injury in the team's ninth game, against the Columbus Tigers. While Thorpe was still a decent player, he had lost much of the speed that helped him throughout his earlier career.

The team lost all of their first nine games, all against NFL opponents, and were outscored 235–12. The Indians finally won their first game of the season against the independent Marion Athletics, 33–0, before splitting their last two games, a 22–19 loss against the Chicago Cardinals and a 19–0 win over the Louisville Brecks.

=== Decline ===
At first, the Oorang Indians were an excellent gate attraction. However, most fans knew that the team underperformed; as the fans had already seen the halftime they stayed for the remainder of the game. The novelty soon wore off and Lingo pulled his financial backing. At the end of the 1923 season, the Oorang Indians disbanded. Lingo didn't renew the franchise, and it formally folded in 1924.

== Legacy ==
In 1997, which was the 75th anniversary of the team's founding, the Marion County Historical Society erected an Ohio Historic Marker on the site of the Oorang Indians' practice field in LaRue, Ohio. Today, LaRue still has the distinction of being the smallest community to have a National Football League franchise. Two members of the Oorang Indians, Jim Thorpe and Joe Guyon, were named as charter members of the National Football League Hall of Fame. Meanwhile, Lingo's kennels, which were the sole reason for the team, thrived until 1929, when the industry was impacted by the Great Depression; however, the Oorang Kennel Company continued until Walter Lingo's death in 1969. The Indians are also believed to have the highest percentage of Oklahomans on its roster than any other NFL squad before or since. Finally, the club was also the first NFL team to have a regular training camp during their short existence.

Lingo revived the Oorang Indians as a basketball team in the late 1920s, again with Jim Thorpe as his star; the basketball version of the Indians is poorly documented.

== Pro Football Hall of Famers ==
Oorang Indians Hall of Famers
Players
No.	Name	Position	Tenure	Inducted
—	Joe Guyon	T/HB	1922–1923	1966
—	Jim Thorpe	Back; Coach	1922–1923	1963

== Season-by-season ==
Year	W	L	T	Finish	Coach
1922	3	6	0	12th	Jim Thorpe
1923	1	10	0	18th	Jim Thorpe

== Tribes represented ==
Cherokee

- Stan Powell
- Emmett McLemore
- Stillwell Saunooke

Chippewa

- Arrowhead
- Napoleon Barrel
- Leon Boutwell
- Ted Buffalo
- Xavier Downwind
- Gray Horse
- Joe Guyon
- Ted St. Germaine
- Baptiste Thunder

Cupeno

- Woodchuck Welmas

Flathead

- Nick Lassa

Mission

- Reggie Attache
- Pete Calac

Mohawk

- Bob Hill
- Joe Little Twig

Mohican

- Eagle Feather

Pomo

- Elmer Busch

Sac and Fox

- Bill Newashe
- Jack Thorpe
- Jim Thorpe

Winnebago

- Bill Winneshiek

Wyandotte

- Al Jolley

== See also ==
- World Famous Indians, the similarly sponsored barnstormer basketball team led by Thorpe
