= Walter Lingo =

Airedale Terrier breeder (1890–1966)

Walter H. Lingo
- Born: October 12, 1890; LaRue, Ohio, U.S.
- Died: December 31, 1966 (aged 76); LaRue, Ohio, U.S.
- Occupations: Retail merchant, dog breeder, NFL team owner
- Known for: Originator of King Oorang breed of Airedale dogs, owner of Oorang Indians NFL team

Walter Houston Lingo (October 12, 1890 – December 31, 1966) was an Airedale Terrier breeder from La Rue, Ohio. During the 1920s, he owned the Oorang Dog Kennels. As a way of promoting his kennels, Lingo financed a National Football League franchise, called the Oorang Indians in 1922.

== Biography ==
=== Dog breeder ===
Walter Lingo was born October 12, 1890, in LaRue, Ohio. His father, Edward Lingo, ran a general store and dry goods business in that town.

At the age of 9 he owned a spotted coon hound that became pregnant. Through his own volition he took out a 25-cent ad in a local hunting-and-trapping magazine offering puppies from the forthcoming litter for sale for $10 each, cash in advance. He received 12 orders for the 7 dog litter, issuing refunds for those who did not receive dogs but taking down names as possible buyers in the future. This positive early business experience set him down the road towards becoming a professional dog breeder.

Lingo continued to sell dogs here and there throughout his school years, finally decided to embark on dog breeding as a profession in 1912, at the age of 22.

Over time he bred and sought to create a stronger type of Airedale. His efforts resulted in the King Oorang breed of Airedale dogs. Lingo described the King Oorang as the "world's great all-around dog." Upon creating the King Oorang breed, Lingo embarked on a mail order business, selling his puppies to people throughout the Americas. Lingo spent most of his time breeding and training his championship Oorang Airedale dogs in LaRue.

Lingo's business model was to sell breeding bitches locally for just $1, with an offer to buy all puppies for $5 each. This allowed him to decentralize and expand puppy production, outsourcing feeding costs and workload. (1920 ad)

He expanded his breeding program to meet the enormous demand for Airedales by selling up to a thousand Airedale bitches to farmers throughout Ohio. Lingo took back the bitches for breeding and whelping, then returned them to their owners, while buying back the pups at a pre-agreed price. Lingo then resold the pups to buyers throughout the country. Reportedly Walter sold up to 15,000 Airedales per year, and by the mid-1920s he claimed to be spending $2,000 per month on advertising.

Over time, the Oorang Kennel Company and its Oorang Airedales became known throughout the world. He donated a stud dog for Red Cross work in Europe to the military during World War I, then, after the war, promoted in advertising for the purpose of breeding. He also gave away dogs as a promotion to winners of contests, silent film stars, baseball players, and two were given to the editor of Field & Stream magazine, who favored the kennel with complimentary ads and even a fictional book or two, featuring Oorang Airedales.

However many of Lingo's neighbors described the Airedales as killers. These neighboring farmers accused the Oorang Kennels of raising a nation of sheep killers. This public relations disaster, prompted Lingo to enlist the aid of celebrities to endorse his dogs. He invited celebrities, such as Ty Cobb of the Detroit Tigers, boxer Jack Dempsey, actor Gary Cooper, Tris Speaker of the Cleveland Indians, and Olympic sprinter Charles Paddock to LaRue to hunt with him and his dogs. Perhaps, Lingo's most famous supporter was Jim Thorpe, the celebrated athlete of the 1920s. With no reluctance at all, Thorpe came to Lingo's aid by testifying that he once knew an Oorang Airedale that had saved a 6-year-old girl's life. After that, Lingo and Thorpe became hunting buddies.

=== Oorang Indians ===
To help promote his dogs, Lingo eventually created the Oorang Indians, an NFL team in La Rue. He established the squad as a publicity stunt and named the team after his Oorang dog kennels. The cost of establishing an NFL franchise in 1922 was $100, however the cost of just one of Lingo's Airedales could sell for $150. The stunt worked and Lingo would go on to make a million dollars selling Airedales in just one year, during the height of popularity of the Oorang Indians. La Rue is the smallest community to have ever sponsored an NFL franchise. The Indians, however, never played a game in La Rue. the team was primarily a traveling team. What "home games" they did play were played in Marion since La Rue lacked a playing field.

Lingo hired Thorpe to put together a team that only consisted of Native American players. He was paid $500 a week to organize the team. The Indians remained a team in the National Football League for the 1922 and the 1923 seasons. The Oorang Indians players didn't only play football. Lingo also required them to work in his kennels, caring for his dogs. He also forced his players to parade around the football field with his dogs during half times, hoping that fans would purchase his dogs. Lingo used his own Airedale terrier magazine, Oorang Comments, to get dog and football enthusiasts buzzing about his product and his team. At first the Oorang Indians were an excellent gate attraction. However, the novelty eventually wore off and Lingo pulled his financial backing. So, at the end of the 1923 NFL season, the Indians suspended operations.

=== First halftime shows ===
Many football historians credit Lingo with creating the halftime show. He would lure audiences to his games with the promise of an outrageous halftime show, instead of the promise of a good football game. Entertainment, both prior to the games and during halftimes, was provided by the players and the Airedale dogs. There were shooting exhibitions with the dogs retrieving the targets. There were Indian dances and tomahawk and knife-throwing demonstrations. One halftime event showcased an Indians player, named Long Time Sleep, wrestling a live bear. Another show was a demonstration of the United States Indian scouts actions during World War I. The show promoted Lingo's kennels by showing the Airedale Red Cross dogs administering first aid to a wounded soldier. Many of the scouts and Red Cross dogs taking part in the event were real veterans of the war, while the German troops were impersonated by local American Legion men who wore German uniforms furnished by Lingo. The halftime activities soon became more important than the results of the game for the Indians fanbase. The Indians only won 3 games in their two seasons of existence.

=== Great Depression ===
After the Oorang Indians' collapse, Lingo continued to sell his Airedale dogs. Unfortunately, the Great Depression struck in the 1930s, prompting Lingo to scale back his business. People could no longer afford the Airedales, prompting Lingo to have approximately three hundred puppies euthanized in 1929 alone. He eventually tried to establish a business in Minneapolis, Minnesota that manufactured dog biscuits, but this venture failed to succeed. However back in LaRue, Lingo's wife, Beryl, revived the kennels. Although the operation was scaled down from its 1920's peak, the Oorang Kennel Company continued until Walter Lingo's death in 1966.
