= Airedale Terrier =

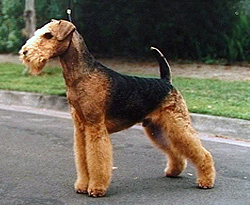
- Other names: Waterside Terrier; Bingley Terrier
- Common nicknames: Airedale; King of Terriers
- Origin: England
Traits
Height	Males	23–24 inches (58–61 cm)
	Females	22–23 inches (56–58 cm)
Weight	Males	40–50 pounds (18–23 kg)
	Females	35–40 pounds (16–18 kg)
- Coat: Broken
- Colour: Black saddle with tan ears, legs, and head; Grizzle saddle also Mahogany Tan accepted. Some white on the chest accepted.
- Litter size: 9 pups
Kennel club standards
- KC: standard
- Fédération Cynologique Internationale: standard

The Airedale Terrier (often shortened to "Airedale"), also called Bingley Terrier and Waterside Terrier, is a dog breed of the terrier type that originated in the valley (dale) of the River Aire, in the West Riding of Yorkshire, England. It is traditionally called the "King of Terriers" because it is the largest of the terrier breeds. The Airedale was bred from the Old English Black and Tan Terrier and the Otterhound and probably some other Terrier breeds, and has contributed to other dog breeds, such as the Yorkshire Terrier.

Originally bred to serve as a versatile hunting and all around working farm dog, this breed has also been used as a war dog, guide dog, and police dog in Britain. In the United States, the breed has been used to hunt big game, upland birds, and water fowl, and serve in many other working capacities.

== Description ==
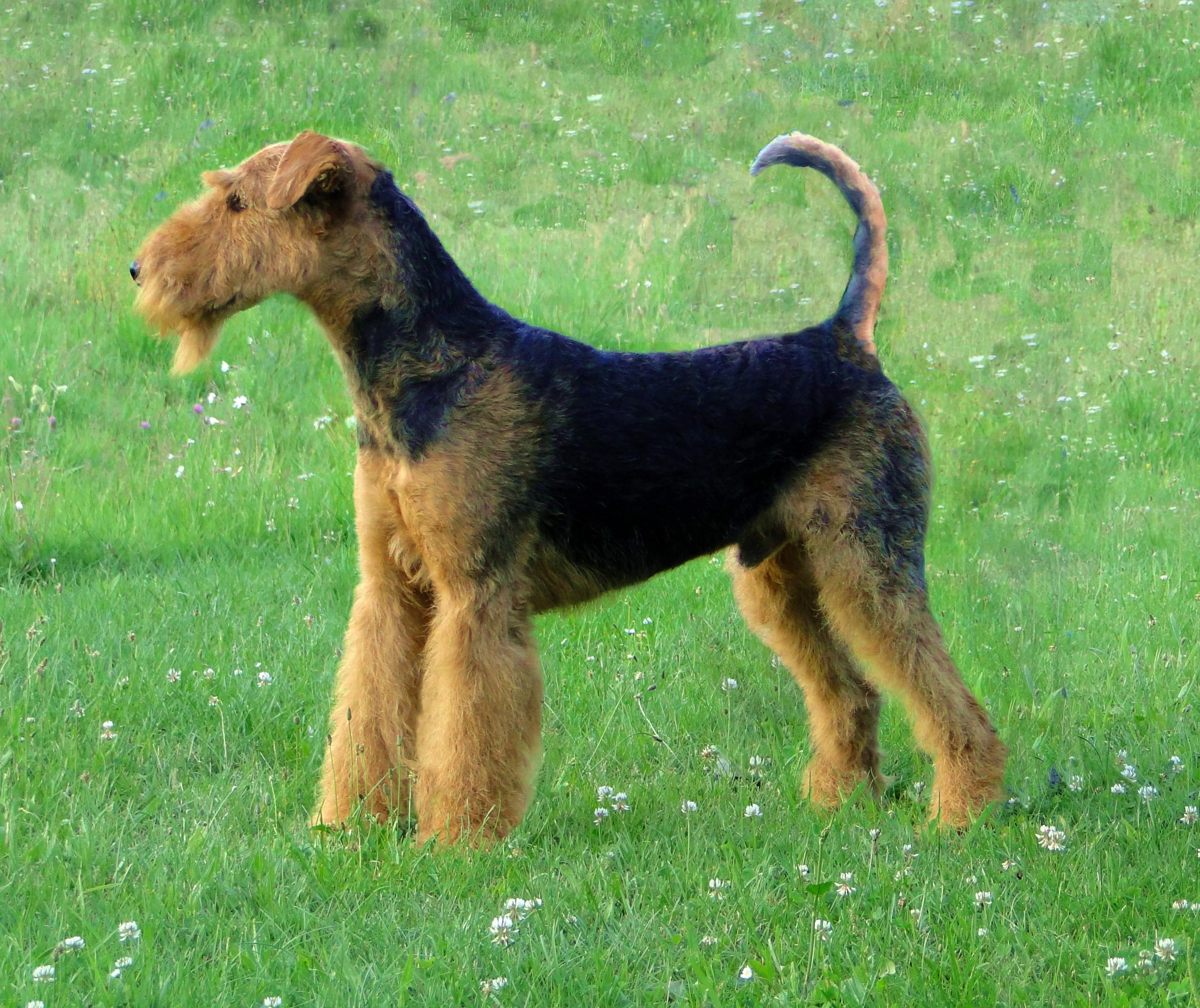
14-month-old Airedale

=== Appearance ===
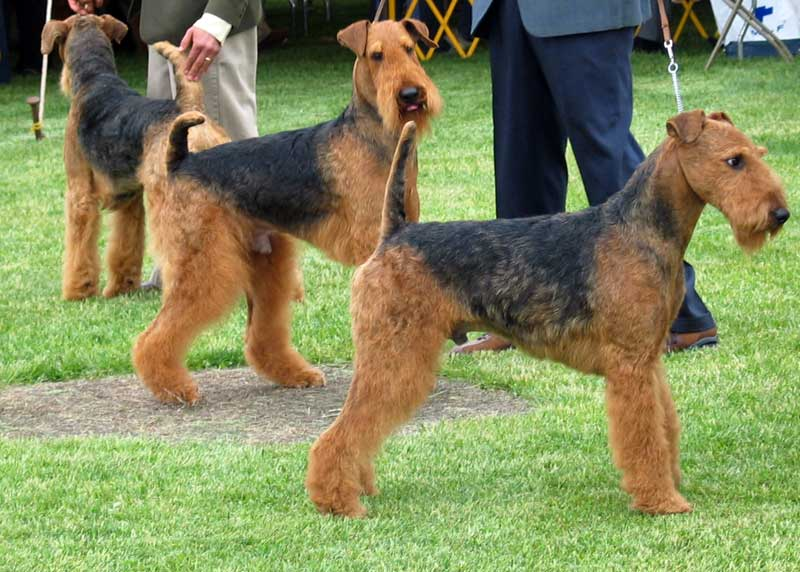
Airedale Terriers being judged at a dog show.

The Airedale is the largest of the British terriers. They weigh 19–25 kilograms (42–55 lb) in fit condition and have a height at the withers of 58–61 centimetres (23–24 in) for males, with females slightly smaller. The American Kennel Club standard specifies a very slightly smaller dog. Larger Airedales, up to 55 kilograms (121 lb) can sometimes be found in North America. They are sometimes referred to as "Oorangs" as this was the name of a kennel in Ohio in the early 1900s that produced this much larger variation, or Roosevelt Terriers.

The Airedale has a medium-length black and tan coat with a harsh topcoat and a soft undercoat. They are an alert and energetic breed, "not aggressive but fearless." It has been claimed that the larger "Oorang" type Airedales are more eager than the smaller, breed standard Airedales, but this is not necessarily so. The large type have been used for big game hunting and as family guardians or as pets, but usually do poorly in AKC (American Kennel Club) conformation shows. This larger type is also significantly more prone to hip dysplasia than the standard Airedales.

==== Coat ====
Like many terriers, this breed has a 'broken' coat, which is hard and wiry. It is meant to be kept not so long as to appear ragged, and lies straight and close, covering body and legs. The outer coat is hard, wiry and stiff, the undercoat softer. The hardest coats are crinkly or just slightly waved. Curly soft coats are highly undesirable.

The coat is commonly called hypoallergenic, but studies have not found significant differences in the levels of allergens between Airedales and other dogs.

Airedales bearing undercoats are generally groomed by hand stripping where a small serrated edged knife is used to pull out loose hair from the dog's coat. Most Airedales require frequent (6 to 8 weeks) clipping or stripping as they do not shed.

The AKC breed standard states that the correct coat color is either a black saddle, with a tan head, ears and legs; or a dark grizzle saddle (black mixed with gray and white). Grizzle that is a mix of red hair in the black, often on the area of back before the tail are often the best and harshest coats. There are, however, examples of non-standard black-coated and "red" (tan) coated Airedales. There are also short coated "Redline" type Airedales, similar in looks to the Airedale's early days when the breed's coats were shorter. Even with their shorter coat they still have the same hard wiry outer coat with a soft under coat and fall well within the criteria of the breed standard.

==== Tail ====
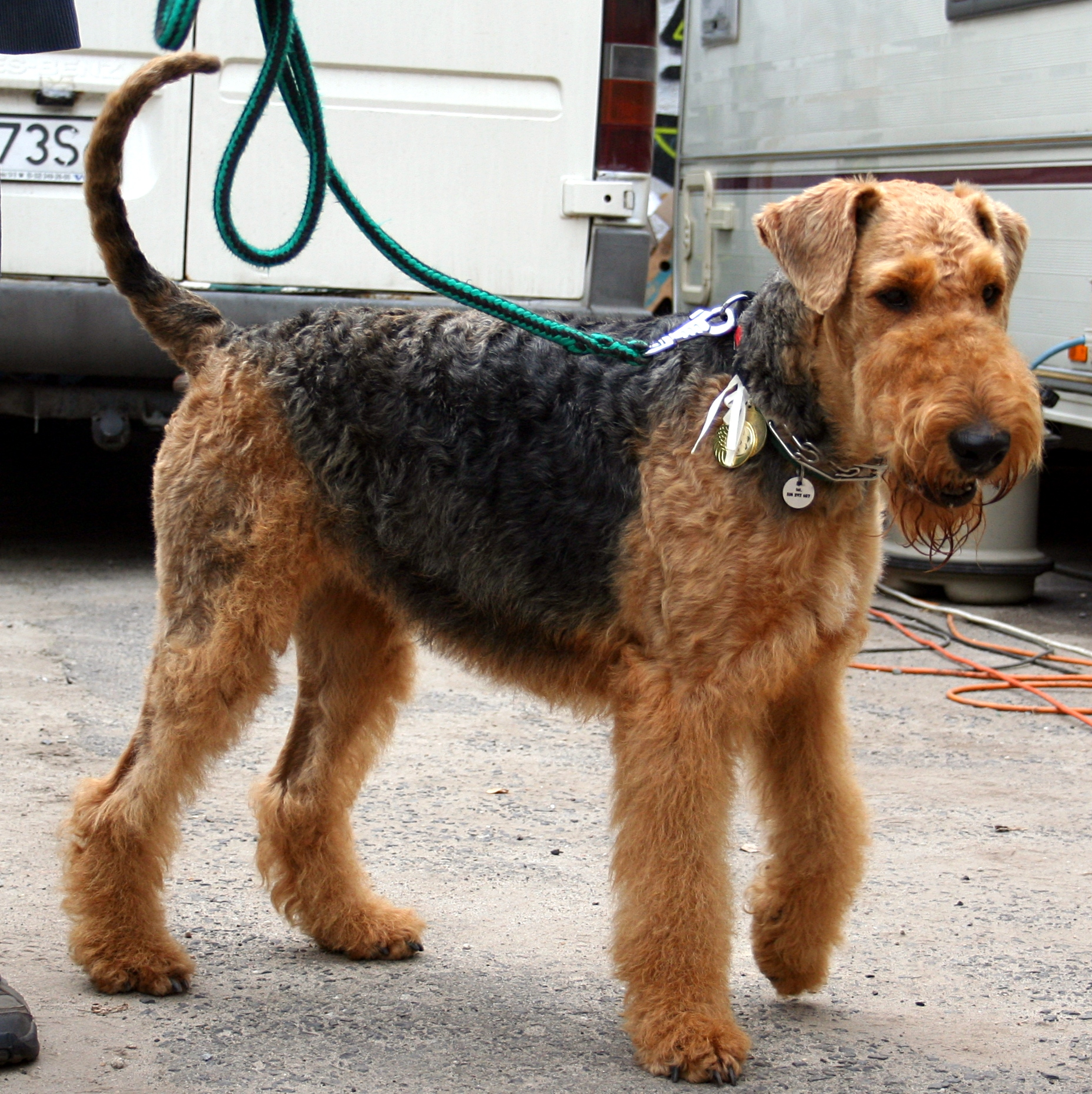
This Airedale's tail is natural (undocked)

Traditionally the fluffy tail is long and erect. In most European countries and Australia it is illegal to dock dogs' tails unless it is for the dog's benefit (e.g., if the tail is broken). This has resulted in the emergence of a spitz tail in some dogs. Selective breeding should see this change over time and the required slightly curled tail set high on the back again become common.

In other parts of the world the Airedale's tail is commonly docked within five days of birth, but this is not considered a breed standard custom. To show an Airedale in the United States, the official AKC standard states "The root of the tail should be set well up on the back. It should be carried gaily but not curled over the back. It should be of good strength and substance and of fair length."

==== Size ====
Airedales weigh approximately 50-80 pounds, being active and agile enough to perform well, while not too small to function as a physical deterrent, retriever or hunter. Some breeders have produced larger Airedale Terriers, such as the 'Oorang Airedale', developed in the 1920s.

Ex-Army captain and Airedale breeder Walter Lingo's monthly magazine "Oorang Comments" (#25, page 81), stated that "When full grown your Airedale dog will weigh from forty to fifty-five pounds and if a female will weigh slightly less. This is the standard weight, but when required, we can furnish oversized Airedales whose weight will be from sixty to one hundred pounds." Because Lingo tried to fill orders for everyone, the Oorang strain size was never standardized. Airedales weighing from 40 to 100 pounds were produced, but for the most part they were approximately 50 pounds and 22 to 24 inches at the shoulder. In the United States, the male Airedales measure 40 to 70 pounds, with the Oorang strain typically in the 80 to 120 pound range.

=== Temperament ===
The Airedale can be used as a working dog and also as a hunting dog. Airedales exhibit some herding characteristics as well and have a propensity to chase animals. They have no problem working with cattle and livestock. However, an Airedale that is not well trained will agitate and annoy the animals.

The Airedale Terrier, like most terriers, has been bred to hunt independently. As a result, the dog is very intelligent, independent, strong-minded, stoic, and sometimes stubborn. Airedales are also very loyal to their owners. Terriers are bred to hunt small animals and their instinct with small animals is to attack.

Albert Payson Terhune wrote of the Airedale:

"Among the mine-pits of the Aire, the various groups of miners each sought to develop a dog which could outfight and outhunt and outthink the other miner's dogs. Tests of the first-named virtues were made in inter-mine dog fights. Bit by bit, thus, an active, strong, heroic, compactly graceful and clever dog was evolved – the earliest true form of the Airedale. He is swift, formidable, graceful, big of brain, an ideal chum and guard. ....To his master he is an adoring pal. To marauders he is a destructive lightning bolt."

The Airedale Terrier ranks 37th in Stanley Coren's The Intelligence of Dogs, being of above average working dog.

== Health ==
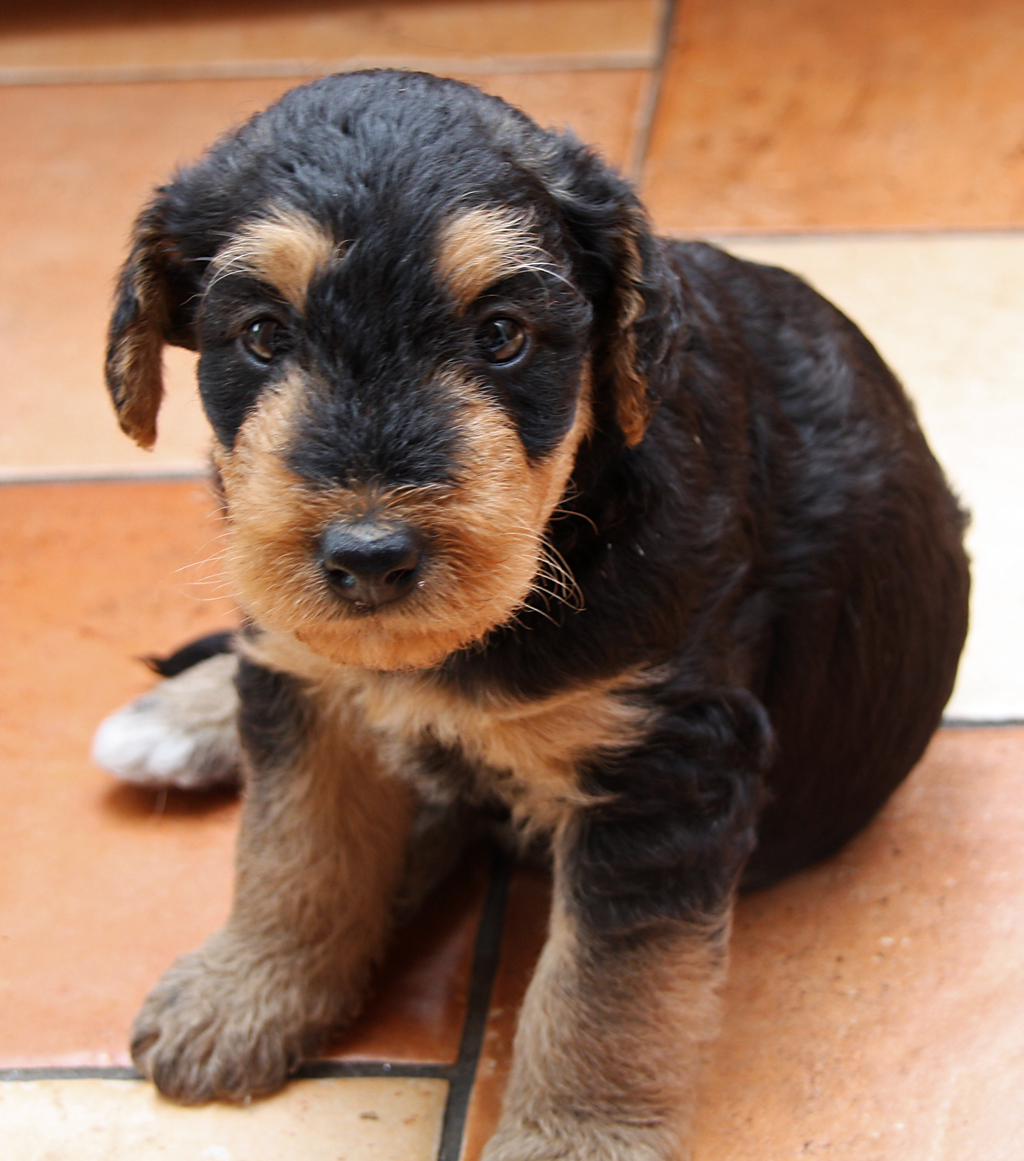
A young puppy.

A UK study found a life expectancy of 12 years for the breed compared to an average of 12.7 for purebreeds and 12 for crossbreeds.

In a 2004 UK Kennel Club survey, the most common causes of death were cancer (39.5%), old age (14%), urologic (9%), and cardiac (7%). In a 2000–2001 USA/Canada Health Survey, the most common causes of death were cancer (38%), urologic (17%), old age (12%), and cardiac (6%)

A study of North American teaching hospitals found 6.22% of Airedale Terriers to have hip dysplasia compared with 3.52% overall.

== History ==
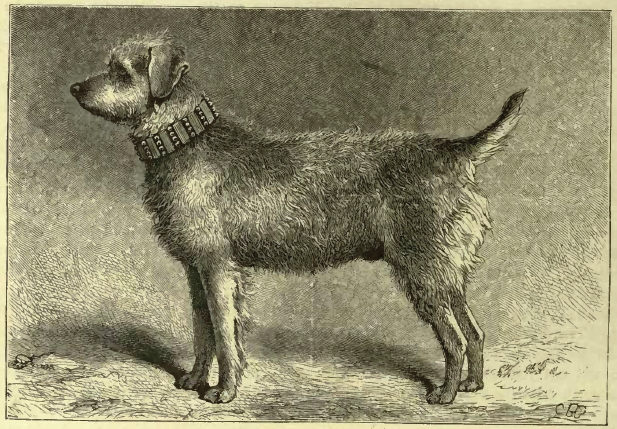
Thunder, a Bingley Terrier and one of the founders of the Airedale Terrier, from The Illustrated Book of the Dog, London/New York 1881

Airedale, a valley (dale) in the West Riding of Yorkshire, named for the River Aire that runs through it, was the birthplace of the breed. In the mid-19th century, working-class people created the Airedale Terrier by crossing the old English rough-coated Black and Tan Terrier with the Otterhound and an assortment of other breeds. In 1886, the Kennel Club of England formally recognized the Airedale Terrier breed.

In 1864 they were exhibited for the first time at a championship dog show sponsored by the Airedale Agricultural Society. They were classified under different names, including Rough Coated, Bingley and Waterside Terrier. In 1879 breed fanciers decided to call the breed the Airedale Terrier, a name accepted by the Kennel Club (England) in 1886.

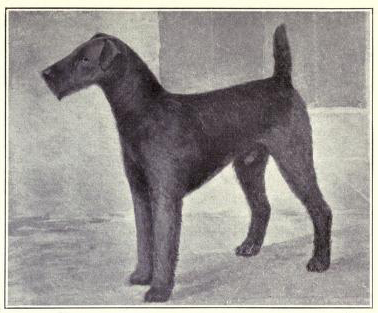
Airedale Terrier circa 1915

The first imports of Airedale Terriers to North America were in the 1880s. The first Airedale to come to American shores was named Bruce. After his 1881 arrival, Bruce won the terrier class in a New York dog show.

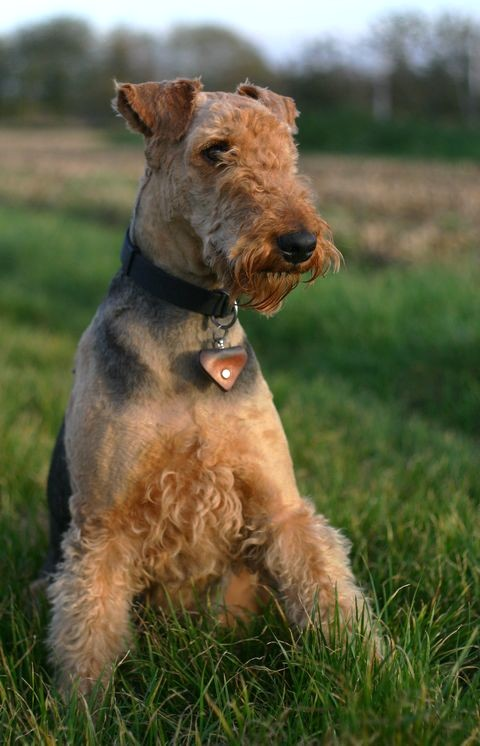
An Airedale sitting

The patriarch of the breed is considered to be CH Master Briar (1897–1906). Two of his sons, Crompton Marvel and Monarch, also made important contributions to the breed.

The first Canadian registrations are recorded in the Stud book of 1888–1889.

In 1910, the ATCA (Airedale Terrier Club of America) offered the Airedale Bowl as a perpetual trophy, which continues to this day. It is now mounted on a hardwood pedestal base, holding engraved plates with the names of the hundreds of dogs that have been awarded Best of Breed at the National Specialties.

The Airedale was extensively used in World War I to carry messages to soldiers behind enemy lines and transport mail. They were also used by the Red Cross to find wounded soldiers on the battlefield. There are numerous tales of Airedales delivering their messages despite terrible injury. An Airedale named "Jack" ran through half a mile of enemy fire, with a message attached within his collar. He arrived at headquarters with his jaw broken and one leg badly splintered, and right after he delivered the message, he dropped dead in front of its recipient.

Lieutenant Colonel Edwin Hautenville Richardson was responsible for the development of messenger and guard dogs in the British Army. He, along with his wife, established the British War Dog School at Shoeburyness in Essex, England. In 1916, they provided two Airedales (Wolf & Prince) for use as message carriers. After both dogs proved themselves in battle, Airedales were given more duties, such as locating injured soldiers on the battlefield, an idea taken from the Red Cross.

Before the adoption of the German Shepherd as the dog of choice for law enforcement and search and rescue work, the Airedale Terrier often filled this role.

In 1906, Richardson tried to interest the British Police in using dogs to accompany officers, for protection on patrol at night. Mr. Geddes, Chief Goods Manager for Hull Docks in Yorkshire, was convinced after he went and saw the impressive work of police dogs in Belgium. Geddes convinced Superintendent Dobie of the North Eastern Railway Police, to arrange a plan for policing the docks. Airedale Terriers were selected for duty as police dogs because of their intelligence, good scenting abilities and their hard, wiry coats that were easy to maintain and clean. They were trained in Hull to attack people not in uniform which could cause problems for their handlers when off duty. The first four dogs began patrols in Hull Docks in 1908, and the scheme was later extended to other docks policed by the North Eastern Railway Police.

At the beginning of the Russo-Japanese War in 1904, the Russian embassy in London contacted Lt. Colonel Richardson for help acquiring dogs for the Russian Army, trained to take the wounded away from the battlefields. He sent terriers, mostly Airedale Terriers, for communication and sanitary services. Although these original imports perished, Airedale Terriers were reintroduced to Russia in the early 1920s for use by the Red Army. Special service dog units were created in 1923, and Airedale Terriers were used as demolition dogs, guard dogs, police tracking dogs and casualty dogs.

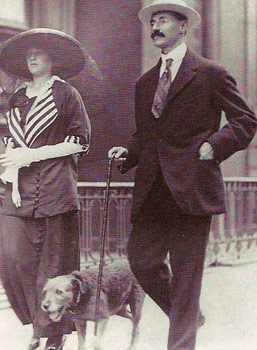
John Jacob Astor IV with his Terrier Kitty

During the 1930s, when airedales were farmed like livestock, Capt. Walter Lingo, of La Rue, Ohio, developed the Oorang Airedale strain. The name came from a line of bench champions, headed by King Oorang 11, a dog which was said to have been the finest utility dog. King could retrieve waterfowl and upland game, tree raccoons, drive cattle and sheep, and bay mountain lions, bears, and wolves. King even fought one of the best fighting Bull Terriers, and killed his opponent. He also trained in Red Cross work, and served the American Expeditionary Force at the front in France.

Lingo simply was not satisfied with the average strain of Airedale, and after an incredible series of breedings, for which he brought in great Airedales from all over the world, he created the "King Oorang". At the time, Field and Stream magazine called it, "the greatest utility dog in the history of the world." The Oorang Kennel Company continued until Walter Lingo's death in 1969. To help promote the King Oorang, as well as his kennels, Lingo created the Oorang Indians football team headed up by Jim Thorpe. The team played in National Football League from 1922 to 1923. Jerry Siebert, an Airedale breeder in Buckeye Lake, Ohio, followed in Lingo's footsteps, and bred "Jerang Airedales". There is a kennel in Tennessee that claims to have original Oorang Airedales.

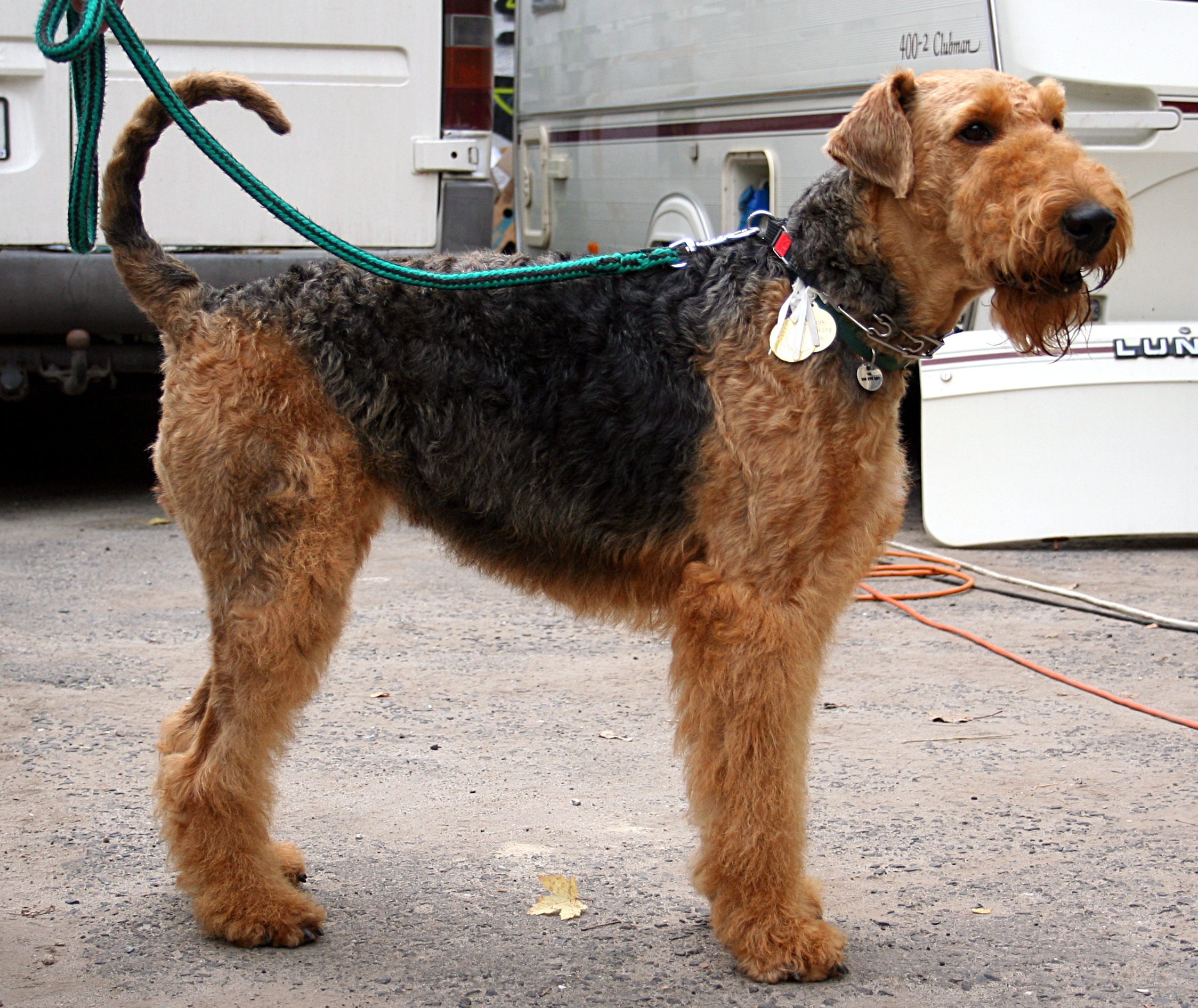
After the First World War, the Airedales' popularity rapidly increased thanks to stories of their bravery on the battlefield

After the First World War, the Airedales' popularity rapidly increased thanks to stories of their bravery on the battlefield and also because Presidents Theodore Roosevelt, Calvin Coolidge, and Warren Harding owned Airedales. President Harding's Airedale, Laddie Boy, was the "first celebrity White House pet". President Harding had a special chair hand carved for him to sit on at very important Cabinet meetings. In the 1920s, the Airedale became the most popular breed in the USA.

President Roosevelt claimed that "An Airedale can do anything any other dog can do and then lick the other dog, if he has to."

1949 marked the peak of the Airedales' popularity in the US, ranked 20th out of 110 breeds recognized by the American Kennel Club.

The Airedale Terrier was recognized by United Kennel Club in 1914 and the American Kennel Club in 1888. The Airedale Terrier Club of America (ATCA), founded in 1900 is the parent club of the breed in the United States and the official-spokes organization for the breed with the American Kennel Club (AKC). The Airedale Terrier Club of America periodically holds performance and conformation events. The Airedale judged to be Best of Breed at these national specialty shows is awarded the Airedale Bowl.

== Notable Airedales ==
- Ruff, owned by the Mitchell family of Dennis the Menace fame.

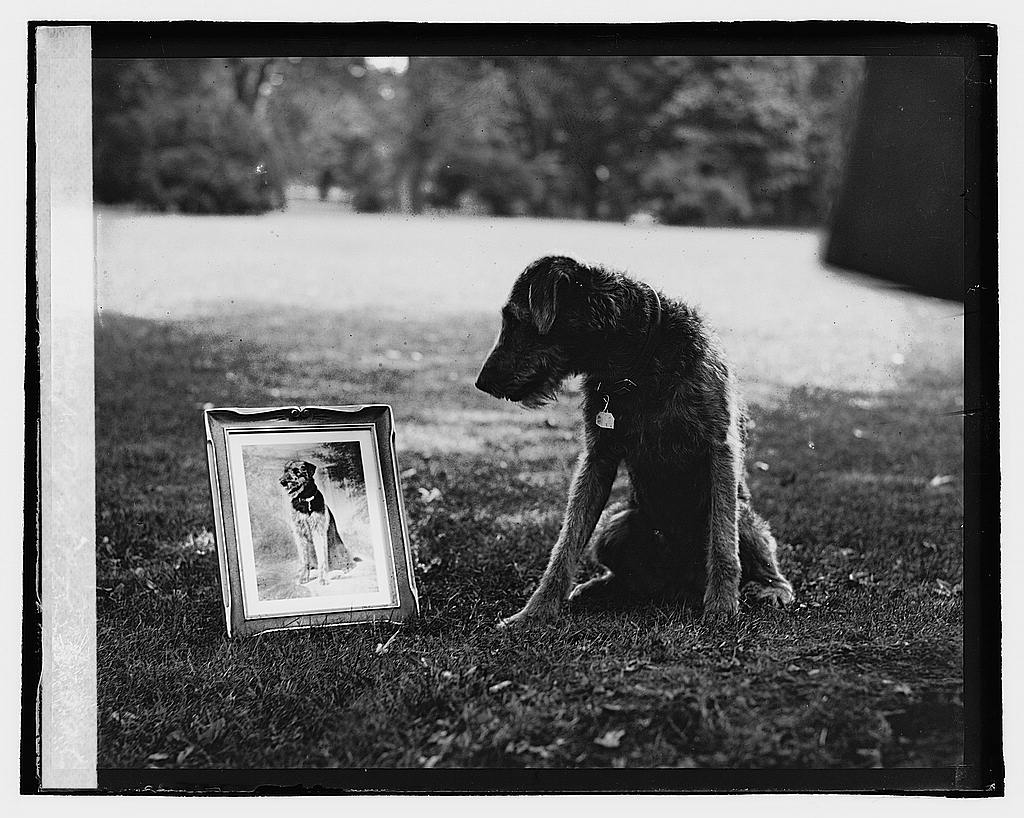
Laddie Boy and his portrait

- Kitty, owned by John Jacob Astor IV, perished during the sinking of the Titanic.
- Laddie Boy, owned by U.S. President Warren G. Harding.
- Paddy the Wanderer, roamed the streets of Wellington, New Zealand, in the Great Depression
- The dog Myrtle Wilson buys in The Great Gatsby is said to be an Airedale, but Nick Carraway notices it has white paws.
- Muggs, "The Dog That Bit People" owned by James Thurber as described in My Life and Hard Times.
- Duke, owned by American actor John Wayne (from which Wayne got his nickname).
- Rufus, from Open Season 2
- Unnamed Airedale, in various episodes of Family Guy
- Kipper, From The 1996 live-action Disney film 101 Dalmatians
- Hugo, owned by Geri Halliwell of The Spice Girls
- Princess Tina, owned by Theodore Wilson (minor character in Australian series Home and Away)

== See also ==
- List of dog breeds
