= La Rue, Ohio =

- Village
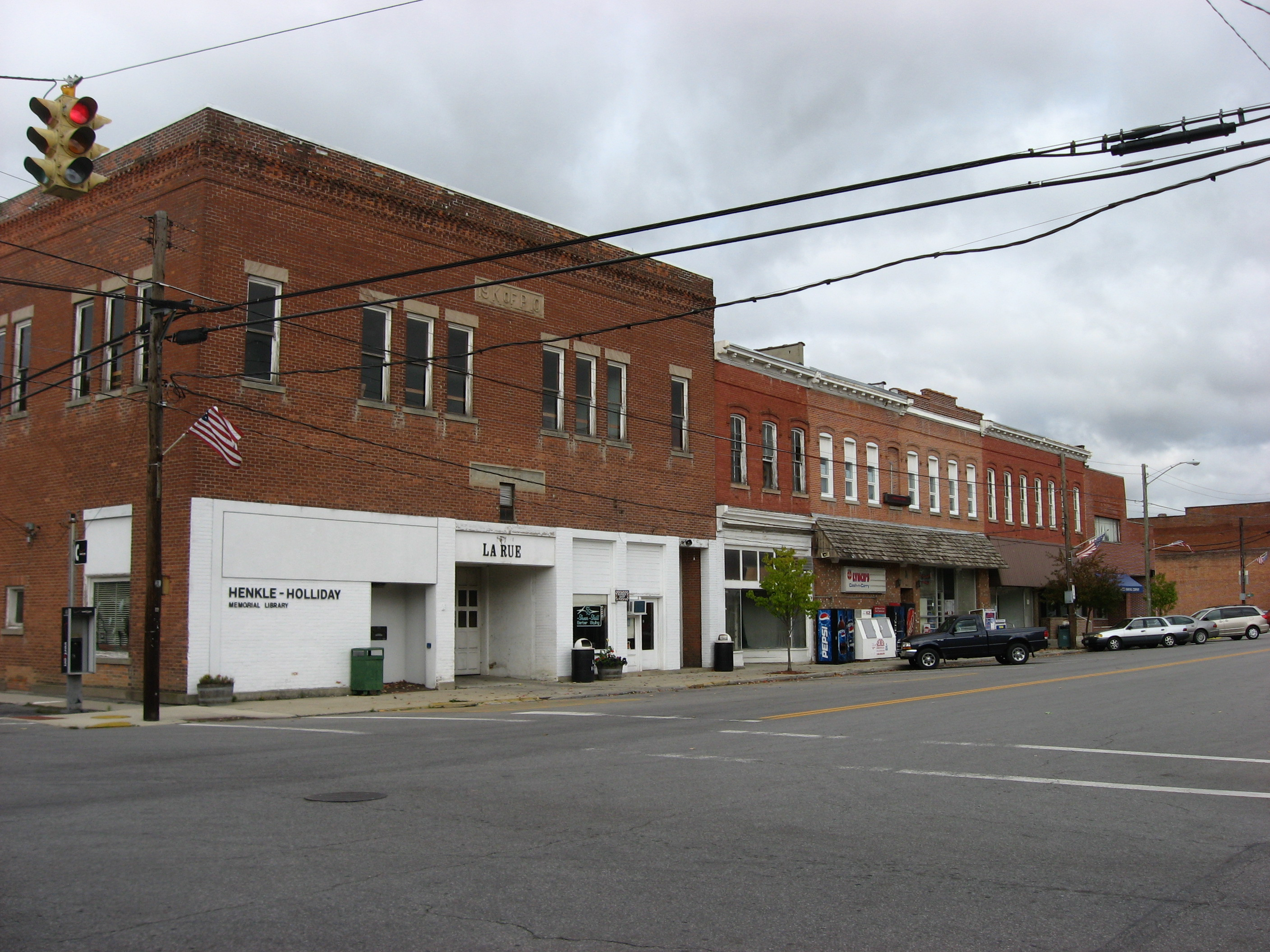
- La Rue's business district

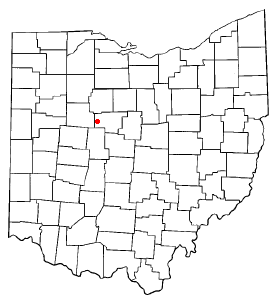
- Location in the state of Ohio

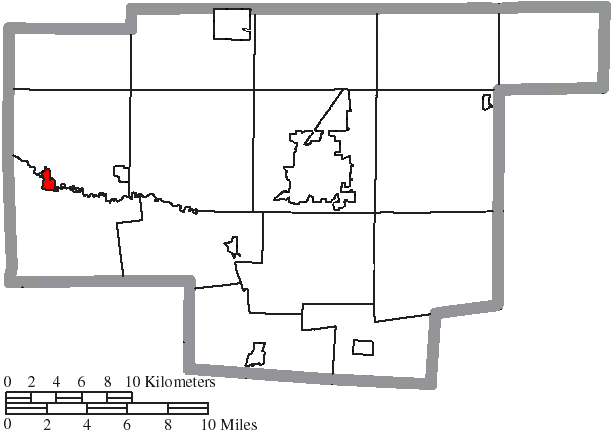
- Location in Marion County
- Coordinates: 40°34′35″N 83°23′05″W
- Country: United States
- State: Ohio
- County: Marion
- Township: Montgomery

Area
  - Total: 0.48 sq mi (1.24 km^{2})
  - Land: 0.48 sq mi (1.24 km^{2})
  - Water: 0 sq mi (0.00 km^{2})
- Elevation: 929 ft (283 m)

Population (2020)
  - Total: 676
  - Density: 1,414.1/sq mi (545.99/km^{2})
- Time zone: UTC-5 (Eastern (EST))
  - Summer (DST): UTC-4 (EDT)
- ZIP Code: 43332
- Area code: 740
- FIPS code: 39-41902
- GNIS feature ID: 1058187
- Website: www.laruevillage.com

La Rue is a village in Marion County, Ohio, United States. The population was 676 at the 2020 census. The village is served by Elgin Local School District. La Rue was named for Major William LaRue, who founded the town on June 3, 1851.

== History ==
In the early 19th-century, prior to their removal in the 1830s, there was a Wyandot village at this location.

La Rue had its start in the early 1850s when the railroad was extended to that point. A post office has been in operation at La Rue since 1853.

La Rue was home to Walter Lingo, owner of the Oorang Dog Kennels, which bred the nationally recognized King Oorang Airedale Terriers. Lingo also owned the National Football League's Oorang Indians, which played in 1922 and 1923. The team consisted of Native American players and was led by Jim Thorpe. They were strictly a traveling team; of the 20 games they played over two seasons, only one was played at "home" in nearby Marion. La Rue remains the smallest town ever to have been the home of an NFL franchise.

== Geography ==
According to the United States Census Bureau, the village has a total area of 0.48 square miles (1.24 km^{2}), all land.

== Demographics ==
Historical population
Census	Pop.	Note	%±
1880	614		—
1890	948		54.4%
1900	997		5.2%
1910	772		−22.6%
1920	795		3.0%
1930	698		−12.2%
1940	714		2.3%
1950	793		11.1%
1960	842		6.2%
1970	867		3.0%
1980	861		−0.7%
1990	802		−6.9%
2000	775		−3.4%
2010	747		−3.6%
2020	676		−9.5%
U.S. Decennial Census

=== 2010 census ===
As of the census of 2010, there were 747 people, 291 households, and 202 families living in the village. The population density was 1,556.3 inhabitants per square mile (600.9/km^{2}). There were 327 housing units at an average density of 681.3 units per square mile (263.1 units/km^{2}). The racial makeup of the village was 94.9% White, 0.3% African American, 0.1% Native American, 2.5% from other races, and 2.1% from two or more races. Hispanic or Latino of any race were 3.7% of the population.

There were 291 households, of which 29.9% had children under the age of 18 living with them, 53.3% were married couples living together, 10.7% had a female householder with no husband present, 5.5% had a male householder with no wife present, and 30.6% were non-families. 25.4% of all households were made up of individuals, and 13.1% had someone living alone who was 65 years of age or older. The average household size was 2.57 and the average family size was 3.03.

The median age in the village was 39.8 years. 25.4% of residents were under the age of 18; 6.5% were between the ages of 18 and 24; 23.9% were from 25 to 44; 26.7% were from 45 to 64; and 17.5% were 65 years of age or older. The gender makeup of the village was 48.9% male and 51.1% female.

=== 2000 census ===
As of the census of 2000, there were 775 people, 308 households, and 207 families living in the village. The population density was 1,608.5 inhabitants per square mile (621.0/km^{2}). There were 330 housing units at an average density of 684.9 units per square mile (264.4 units/km^{2}). The racial makeup of the village was 99.23% White, 0.13% Native American, and 0.65% from two or more races. Hispanic or Latino of any race were 0.13% of the population.

There were 308 households, out of which 31.8% had children under the age of 18 living with them, 54.9% were married couples living together, 9.1% had a female householder with no husband present, and 32.5% were non-families. 27.6% of all households were made up of individuals, and 15.6% had someone living alone who was 65 years of age or older. The average household size was 2.51 and the average family size was 3.01.

In the village, the population was spread out, with 26.8% under the age of 18, 7.6% from 18 to 24, 28.8% from 25 to 44, 18.6% from 45 to 64, and 18.2% who were 65 years of age or older. The median age was 37 years. For every 100 females there were 97.2 males. For every 100 females age 18 and over, there were 88.4 males.

The median income for a household in the village was $34,375, and the median income for a family was $44,808. Males had a median income of $27,250 versus $25,238 for females. The per capita income for the village was $15,873. About 4.4% of families and 7.8% of the population were below the poverty line, including 9.5% of those under age 18 and 3.0% of those age 65 or over.

== Events ==
A festival called the "Oorang Bang" in honor of the Oorang Indians, Thorpe, and Oorang Airedales was held on the second weekend of June, featuring a parade, food, rides, and live music. The festival was first organized by local resident, and park board president, Harry Roberts (1924–2003) to fund improvements to the then derelict municipal swimming pool and park, located one mile (1.6 km) north of the village.

The Marion County Raceway was located in La Rue.

== Notable people ==
- Edgar Bain, metallurgist who developed techniques for alloying steel
- Toby Harrah, baseball player, played high school baseball in LaRue
- Walter Lingo, dog kennel owner and owner of the Oorang Indians football team
- Gladys Milligan, painter
- Grant E. Mouser, congressman from Ohio
- Charles E. Sawyer, homeopathic physician who is blamed for giving a false diagnosis of U.S. President Warren G. Harding that led to Harding's premature death; practiced medicine in La Rue
- Richard Secord, U.S. Air Force major general, figure in the Iran-Contra scandal
