= 1911 All-Eastern football team =

American all-star college football team

The 1911 All-Eastern football team consists of American football players chosen by various selectors as the best players at each position among the Eastern colleges and universities during the 1911 college football season.

== All-Eastern selections ==
=== Quarterbacks ===
- Earl Sprackling, Brown (AP-1; PE-1)
- Art Howe, Yale (AP-1)
- Shorty Miller, Penn State (AP-2)

=== Halfbacks ===
- John Dalton, Navy (AP-1; PE-1)
- Percy Wendell, Harvard (AP-1; PE-1)
- Jim Thorpe, Carlisle (AP-2; PE-1)
- Ray Morrison, Vanderbilt (AP-2)

=== Fullbacks ===
- Leroy Mercer, Penn (AP-1)

=== Ends ===
- Sanford White, Princeton (AP-1; PE-1)
- Smith, Harvard (AP-2; PE-1)
- Douglas Bomeisler, Yale (AP-1)

=== Tackles ===
- Ed Hart, Princeton (AP-1; PE-1)
- Jim Scully, Yale (AP-1; PE-1)
- John Brown, Navy (AP-2; PE-1)
- Jogger Elcock, Dartmouth (AP-2)

=== Guards ===
- Arnold, Army (AP-2; PE-1)
- Joseph Duff, Princeton (AP-1)
- Bob Fisher, Harvard (AP-1)
- George Howe, Navy (AP-2)

=== Centers ===
- Arthur Bluethenthal, Princeton (AP-1; PE-1)
- Hank Ketcham, Yale (AP-1)

== Key ==
- AP = Associated Press
- PE = Post Express

== See also ==
- 1911 College Football All-America Team
