= 1911 college football rankings =

- Season: 1911
- Bowl season: 1911–12 bowl games
- End of season champions: Harvard

The 1911 college football season rankings included a championship selection by The New York Times.

== The New York Times ==
In December 1911, The New York Times listed Princeton as football's "Champion College Team" in an end-of-year listing of champions in all sports.

Rank	Team	Record
1	Princeton	8–0–2

== See also ==
- 1911 College Football All-America Team
