= 1911 Princeton Tigers football team =

American college football season

1911 Princeton Tigers football

National champion (Helms, Houlgate, Davis) Co-national champion (NCF)
- Conference: Independent
- Record: 8–0–2
- Head coach: Bill Roper (5th season)
- Offensive scheme: Short punt
- Captain: Ed Hart
- Home stadium: Osborne Field

1911 Eastern college football independents records
	Conf.			Overall
Team	W	L	T	W		L		T
Penn State		–		8	–	0	–	1
Carlisle		–		11	–	1	–	0
Princeton		–		8	–	0	–	2
Trinity (CT)		–		6	–	0	–	2
Temple		–		6	–	1	–	0
Army		–		6	–	1	–	1
Swarthmore		–		6	–	1	–	1
Dartmouth		–		8	–	2	–	0
Lafayette		–		8	–	2	–	0
Yale		–		7	–	2	–	1
Harvard		–		6	–	2	–	1
Cornell		–		7	–	3	–	0
Rhode Island State		–		5	–	2	–	1
Brown		–		7	–	3	–	1
Bucknell		–		6	–	3	–	1
Penn		–		7	–	4	–	0
Pittsburgh		–		4	–	3	–	1
Washington & Jefferson		–		6	–	4	–	0
Syracuse		–		5	–	3	–	2
Dickinson		–		4	–	4	–	0
Lehigh		–		5	–	5	–	1
Rutgers		–		4	–	4	–	1
Dickinson		–		4	–	4	–	0
St. Bonaventure		–		2	–	2	–	0
Carnegie Tech		–		4	–	5	–	0
Holy Cross		–		4	–	5	–	0
Tufts		–		3	–	4	–	0
Vermont		–		3	–	5	–	0
NYU		–		1	–	3	–	3
Colgate		–		3	–	6	–	0
Franklin & Marshall		–		3	–	6	–	0
New Hampshire		–		1	–	5	–	1
Geneva		–		1	–	6	–	1
Villanova		–		0	–	5	–	1
Boston College		–		0	–	7	–	0

The 1911 Princeton Tigers football team was an American football team that represented Princeton University as an independent during the 1911 college football season. In their fifth season under head coach Bill Roper, the Tigers compiled an 8–0–2 record, shut out seven of ten opponents, and outscored all opponents by a total of 179 to 15. Tackle Ed Hart was the team captain.

At the end of the season the team was named as the year's champion by The New York Times. Princeton was later retroactively named as the national champion by the Billingsley Report, Helms Athletic Foundation, Houlgate System, and Parke H. Davis, and as a co-national champion (with Penn State) by the National Championship Foundation.

Three Princeton players were selected as consensus first-team players on the 1911 All-America team: end Sanford White; guard Joseph Duff; and tackle Ed Hart. Other notable players included halfback Talbot Pendleton, fullback Wallace DeWitt, and center Arthur Bluethenthal.

== Schedule ==
Date	Opponent	Site	Result	Attendance	Source
September 30	Stevens	Osborne Field; Princeton, NJ	W 37–0		
October 4	Rutgers	Osborne Field; Princeton, NJ (rivalry)	W 37–0	3,000	
October 7	Villanova	Osborne Field; Princeton, NJ	W 31–0		
October 11	Lehigh	Osborne Field; Princeton, NJ	T 6–6		
October 14	Colgate	Osborne Field; Princeton, NJ	W 31–0		
October 21	at Navy	Worden Field; Annapolis, MD	T 0–0		
October 28	Holy Cross	Osborne Field; Princeton, NJ	W 20–0		
November 4	Harvard	Osborne Field; Princeton, NJ (rivalry)	W 8–6		
November 11	Dartmouth	Osborne Field; Princeton, NJ	W 3–0		
November 18	at Yale	Yale Field; New Haven, CT (rivalry)	W 6–3	35,000	
