= Leland Devore =

American football player and military officer (1889–1939)

Profile
- Position: Tackle

Personal information
- Born: January 8, 1889; Wheeling, West Virginia, U.S.
- Died: January 15, 1939 (aged 50); Washington, D.C., U.S.
- Listed height: 6 ft 4 in (1.93 m)
- Listed weight: 225 lb (102 kg)

Career information
- College: Army (1911)

Awards and highlights
- Consensus All-American (1911); Third-team All-American (1912)

Leland Swarts Devore (January 8, 1889 – January 15, 1939) was an American college football player and military officer. He played football as a tackle with Army and was a consensus selection on the 1911 College Football All-America Team.

== Biography ==
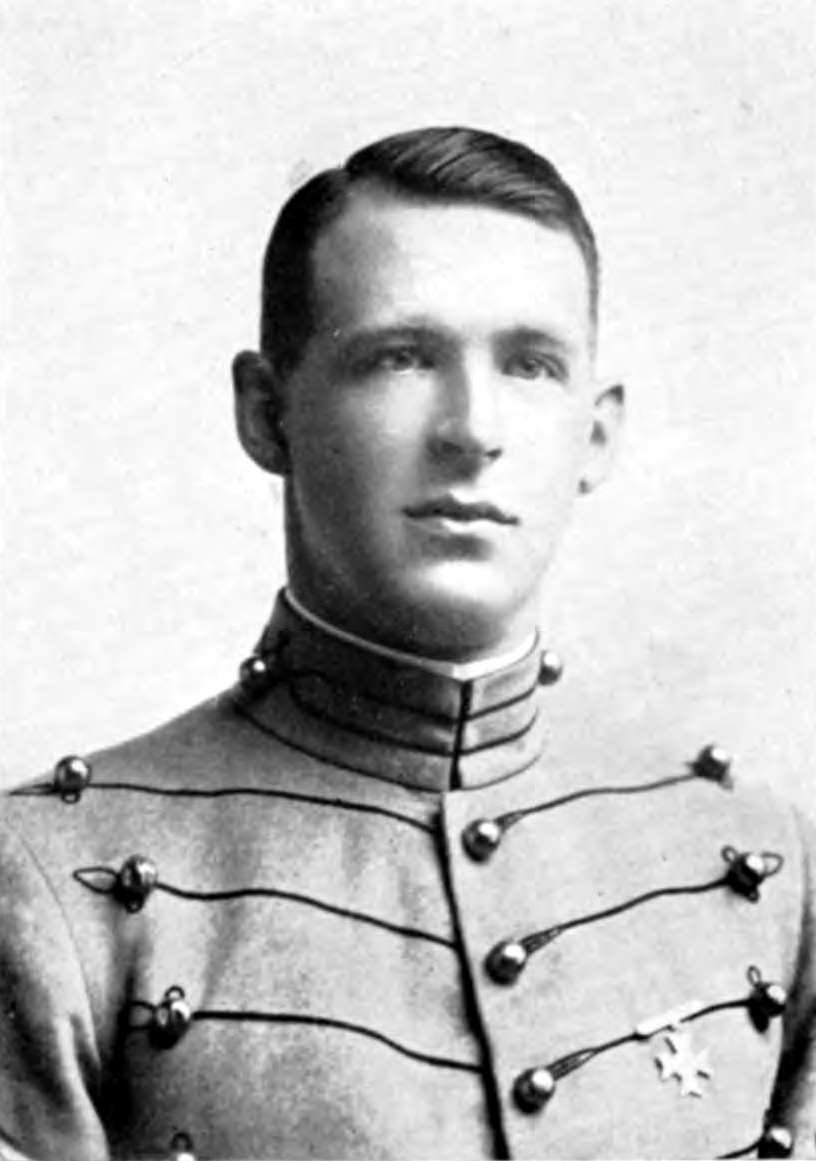
At West Point in 1913

Devore grew up in Wheeling, West Virginia, and was the son of James Harvey Devore, a prominent West Virginia broker. He graduated from Wheeling High School and enrolled at the United States Military Academy at West Point, New York. Devore, who was 6 feet, 4 inches tall, and weighed 225 pounds, played at the tackle position for Army's football team while attending West Point. In 1911, Devore was selected as a first-team All-American, then selected as the captain of the 1912 Army Cadets football team. Devore was also the heavyweight boxing champion at the academy, the silver medalist in heavyweight wrestling, and lettered in both baseball and basketball.

Devore was commissioned as a lieutenant in the infantry and accompanied Gen. John J. Pershing on the Pancho Villa Expedition into Mexico in 1916. The expedition marked the first use of motorized transport trucks and cars by the U.S. Army, and Devore was selected as the Army's first motor transport officer. Devore served as an infantry officer in France during World War I where he was wounded.

Devore spent his career in the Army and was promoted to the rank of lieutenant colonel. Devore was married to Genevieve (Welty) Devore, and the couple had a son, Leland S. Devore, Jr.

Devore later served as commandant and professor of military science at West Virginia University. He died on January 15, 1939, at Walter Reed Hospital in Washington, D. C. following a long illness.
