= Sanford White =

American football and baseball player (1888–1964)

Sanford "Sammy" White
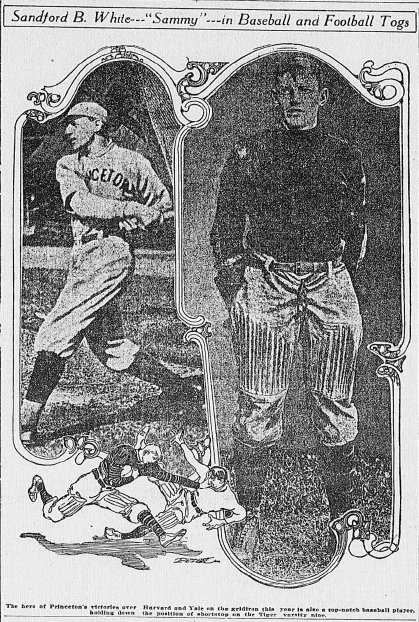

Profile
- Position: End

Personal information
- Born: May 4, 1888; Fall River, Massachusetts, U.S.
- Died: April 11, 1964 (aged 75); Easton, Maryland, U.S.

Career information
- College: Princeton University

Awards and highlights
- National champion (1911); First-team All-American (1911)

Sanford Brownell "Sammy" White (May 4, 1888 – April 11, 1964) was an American football and baseball player. He played college football for the Princeton Tigers football team from 1910 to 1911 and was a consensus first-team All-American football player in 1911. He scored every point for the Tigers in their 1911 victories over Harvard and Yale, leading the team to the eastern college football championship. White also played baseball and basketball at Princeton. As team captain, he led Princeton to a baseball championship in 1911.

== Early life ==
White was born at Fall River, Massachusetts, in 1888. He attended Fall River High School and then preparatory school at Exeter in New Hampshire. White played both baseball and football for Exeter.

== Princeton ==
=== Multi-sport athlete ===
White enrolled at Princeton University in 1908. At Princeton, he became a four-sport star, competing in football, baseball, basketball, and track. In the summer of 1909, he played for the Hyannis town team in what is now the Cape Cod Baseball League. In December 1911, he reportedly also tried out for the Princeton ice hockey team. During his sophomore year, he did not play football and played only baseball and basketball. He was selected as the captain of the baseball team as a junior and led the team to a baseball championship.

=== 1911 football season ===
White reportedly considered baseball his true love, disliked football, and joined the football team in 1911 only after being coaxed into doing so. Having been a substitute on the 1910 football team, he became a starter at left end for the 1911 Princeton Tigers football team. He led the team to the 1911 eastern college football championship. The 1911 Princeton team compiled an 8-0-2 record and outscored opponents 179 to 15.

In Princeton's 8–6 victory over Harvard on November 4, 1911, White was responsible for all eight points scored by the Tigers. He blocked a field goal attempt by Harvard and then picked up the loose ball and returned it 95 yards for a touchdown. Later in the game, Harvard's quarterback caught a punt deep in Harvard's territory. White reportedly "hurled himself at the Harvard man in a fierce tackle and threw him back over the goal line for a safety that won the game for Princeton."

Two weeks after the Harvard game, White played his final football game for Princeton against Yale. Princeton had not beaten Yale since 1903, and the game was played at Yale Field in front of a crowd of 33,000. Princeton won the game 6–3 in large part due to the play of White. White recovered five Yale fumbles on a field of ankle-deep mud. He returned one of those fumbles 65 yards for a touchdown for Princeton's only score. The Boston Globe led its story on the game with a front-page headline, "TIGERS' FOOTBALL HERO FOR PRESIDENT." The New York Times reported on White's long run as follows:

"He can run, White can. He followed the ball like a hound follows the fox. Ever ready to scoop it up and run with all the speed in his long, lithe limbs. Once out in front he runs like the wind, looks neither to the right nor left, but with his nose pointing toward the enemy's goal his cleets tear up the muddy turf and he runs faster and faster until, the leather tucked under his arm in a vise-like grip, he plants it behind the line and wins the game. That's Sam White."

White won accolades for his alert play during the 1911 season. One sports writer opined that "football has never known a player with a 'nose for the ball' like 'Sammy' White." Another writer added, "The college football season each year develops a 'hero,' and this year his name is Sanford B. White, left end of the Princeton team." Yet another proclaimed him "the greatest athlete the institution [Princeton] has ever produced."

=== Awards and honors ===
At the end of the 1911 season, White was chosen as a first-team All-American on the teams selected by, among others, Walter Camp, The New York Globe, Tommy Clark, Wilton S. Farnsworth, Henry L. Williams, Charles Chadwick, Baseball Magazine, and The Christian Science Monitor. The Princeton Club of Philadelphia also presented White with a gold cigarette case filled with a piece of sod taken from the spot where White planted the ball in the end zone at Yale Field.

White was also the president of Princeton's senior class, president of its Senior Student Council, and was voted the most popular, most respected, best all-around man, and the man who did most for his class. He graduated from Princeton in June 1912.

== Business career and military service ==
After graduating from Princeton, White represented International Harvester Corporation in the Midwest. He next worked for the Princeton Bank and Trust Co.

In the fall of 1917, White served as the chairman of the local Liberty Loan committee at Princeton, raising funds to support the allied cause in World War I. In January 1918, he enlisted in the Aviation Section, U.S. Signal Corps. He was commissioned as a second lieutenant and served as a post adjutant.

After his discharge from the military, White returned to work for International Harvester. He became the secretary and remained with the company until his retirement in 1947.

== Family and later years ==
In April 1913, White was married to Jeanette McAusland at Summit, New Jersey. He had two sons, Sanford B., Jr., and Charles McAusland, and two daughters, Jean (married to Edward Bax) and Priscilla (married to Ashton Graham). He died of a heart attack in April 1964 at age 75.
