= 1914 Pittsburgh Panthers football team =

American college football season

1914 Pittsburgh Panthers football
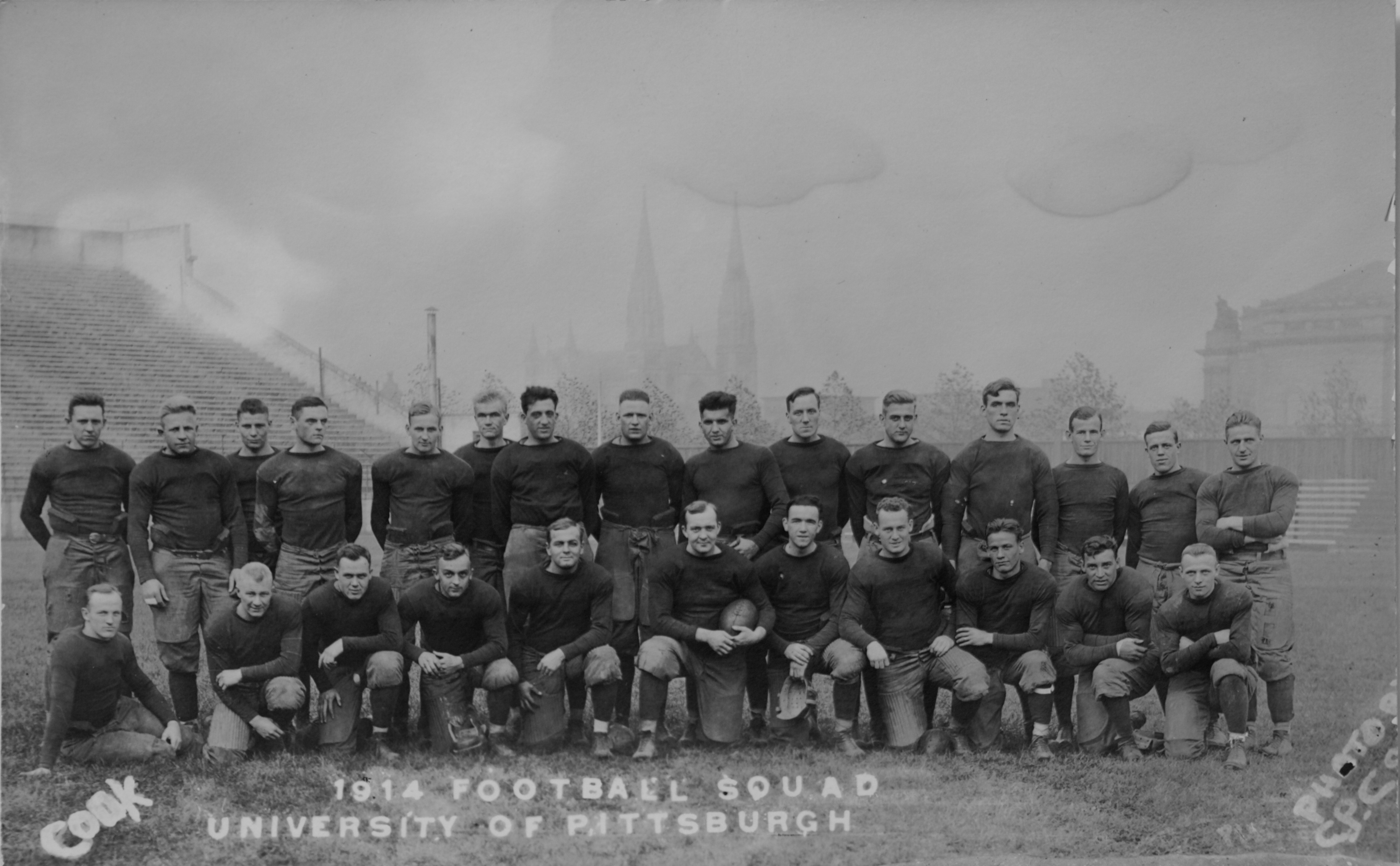
- Conference: Independent
- Record: 8–1
- Head coach: Joseph Duff (2nd season)
- Captain: Wayne Smith
- Home stadium: Forbes Field

1914 Eastern college football independents records
	Conf.			Overall
Team	W	L	T	W		L		T
Army		–		9	–	0	–	0
Harvard		–		7	–	0	–	2
Washington & Jefferson		–		10	–	1	–	0
Dartmouth		–		8	–	1	–	0
Lehigh		–		8	–	1	–	0
Pittsburgh		–		8	–	1	–	0
Cornell		–		8	–	2	–	0
Yale		–		7	–	2	–	0
Franklin & Marshall		–		6	–	2	–	1
Colgate		–		5	–	2	–	1
Princeton		–		5	–	2	–	1
Brown		–		5	–	2	–	2
Fordham		–		6	–	3	–	1
Geneva		–		5	–	3	–	0
Tufts		–		5	–	3	–	0
Penn State		–		5	–	3	–	1
Rutgers		–		5	–	3	–	1
Lafayette		–		5	–	3	–	2
Syracuse		–		5	–	3	–	2
Boston College		–		5	–	4	–	0
NYU		–		5	–	4	–	0
Villanova		–		4	–	3	–	1
Bucknell		–		4	–	4	–	1
Carnegie Tech		–		4	–	4	–	0
Penn		–		4	–	4	–	1
Temple		–		3	–	3	–	0
Rhode Island State		–		2	–	3	–	3
Carlisle		–		5	–	10	–	1
Holy Cross		–		2	–	5	–	1
Vermont		–		2	–	6	–	1
New Hampshire		–		1	–	6	–	2
Duquesne		–		1	–	5	–	0

The 1914 Pittsburgh Panthers football team was an American football team that represented the University of Pittsburgh as an independent during the 1914 college football season. In its second season under head coach Joseph Duff, the team compiled an 8–1 record and outscored all opponents by a total of 207 to 38.

== Schedule ==
Date	Opponent	Site	Result	Attendance	Source
September 26	at Cornell	Percy Field; Ithaca, NY	W 9–3		
October 3	Westminster (PA)	D.C. & A.C. Field; Wilkinsburg, PA	W 21–10		
October 10	at Navy	Worden Field; Annapolis, MD	W 13–6	8,000	
October 17	Carlisle	Forbes Field; Pittsburgh, PA	W 10–3		
October 24	Georgetown	Forbes Field; Pittsburgh, PA	W 21–0		
October 31	Dickinson	Forbes Field; Pittsburgh, PA	W 96–0		
November 7	Washington & Jefferson	Forbes Field; Pittsburgh, PA	L 10–13	30,000	
November 14	Carnegie Tech	Forbes Field; Pittsburgh, PA	W 14–0		
November 26	Penn State	Forbes Field; Pittsburgh, PA (rivalry)	W 13–3	17,000	

== Preseason ==
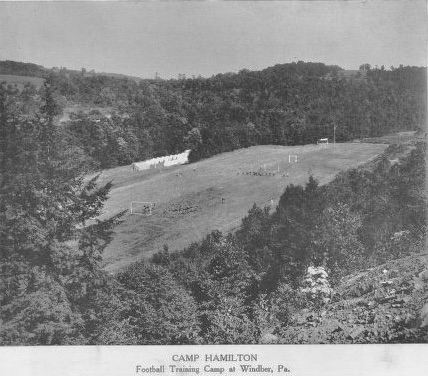
Preseason setup at Camp Hamilton

The Pitt Weekly noted proudly:

"The football team of 1913 brought the University from a position of relative unimportance among the colleges to a place on a level with the ten or twelve leaders in the sport. This success is to be attributed to various causes, but the underlying reasons are found in the inauguration of the new coaching policy under Duff and Harlan, the acquisition of a number of new men who raised the standard of play, the hard course of training undergone in the football camp at Windber during the month of September and the erection of a permanent training house where the proper care and supervision might be given the members of the team."

Coach Joseph Duff, 1911 Princeton graduate, with only one season of assistant coaching experience led the 1913 University of Pittsburgh eleven to a 6–2–1 record. A. R. Hamilton summed it up best in The Pitt Weekly season recap:

"The season's record stands as a gratifying monument to Joe Duff's initial efforts as a coach. He asked a free rein and agreed to shoulder all the blame in case the outcome of the season was unsatisfactory. On the same platform he is entitled to all the credit. His job was a hard one. He came on the heels of the most disastrous football season Pitt has ever known....Our squad was dangerously small in numbers and was short of experienced men. We had only two three-year men and the big proportion of the balance were freshmen. Duff was new to the men and they were new to him...Everybody had to feel his way the first few days except Duff...He knew exactly what he had to accomplish and he lost no time heading in that direction. So determinedly had he impressed himself on the entire situation, once he had taken hold, that before a week was up all hands were driving along toward a common goal."

Accordingly, the December 12 edition of The Pitt Weekly reported: "Because of his brilliant work in turning out a winning team this past season Joe Duff, former Princeton player, was re-elected coach of the University football eleven for next year at a meeting of the General Athletic Committee." Edwin H. W. "Nubs" Harlan was retained as assistant coach by Coach Duff.

Guard Wayne "Red" Smith was elected captain for the 1914 season by his teammates at the 1913 team banquet. The Pitt Weekly praised: "Red has been one of the standbys in the line ever since he matriculated three years ago."

Graduate Manager Davis had the 1914 schedule ready by March 18. The first game was considered a "hard" contest with Cornell, "where the (Pitt) men will be fresh from their training period in the mountains." Next a supposed easy game with Westminster was followed by another road game at Navy. The remaining games on the schedule were played at Forbes field. The Pitt Weekly stated: "Altogether this is the best arranged schedule that has ever appeared for our varsity. Not only from the players' standpoint but also in a financial way this arrangement should be very satisfactory." Mr. Davis appointed Alan K. Collingwood (Class of 1916, School of Economics) student football manager for the 1914 season.

On September 2, forty-four prospects assembled at Union Station for the trip to Johnstown, followed by a car ride to Camp Hamilton at Windber, PA for three weeks of preseason drills. Coach Duff welcomed fourteen returning letter men and plenty of promising recruits. The Pittsburgh Daily Post noted one in particular:

"Another track star who will enter the University this fall is J. B. Sutherland, of Oberlin Preparatory School...His specialties are the discus and the shot, he having a record of better than 125 feet in the former event and 40 feet in the shot. The University discus record is six feet short of Sutherland's record. He will try for the football team this fall also, as a lineman, although he has had little gridiron experience. It is believed that he will eventually develop into a great football player, as he has weight speed and courage."

During this camp session, Coach Duff's most significant personnel adjustment was moving Robert Peck from fullback to center, where he would become a three time All-American. Camp disbanded on September 24 and the squad headed to Ithaca to take on the Big Red of Cornell.

The University of Pittsburgh Athletic Council published the seventy-two page Fifth Annual Football Year Book for use as the 1914 game day program. The cover illustration was done by Rowland R. Murdoch, illustrator for the Pittsburgh Press.

== Coaching staff ==
1914 Pittsburgh Panthers football staff
Coaching staff: Joseph M. Duff Jr. – Head coach; Edwin H. W. Harlan – Assistant backfield coach; Floyd Rose - assistant; Hunter Johnson - Trainer	Support staff: A. K. Collingwood - Student football manager; Karl E. Davis – Graduate manager of athletics; Charles S. Miller – Director of athletics

== Roster ==
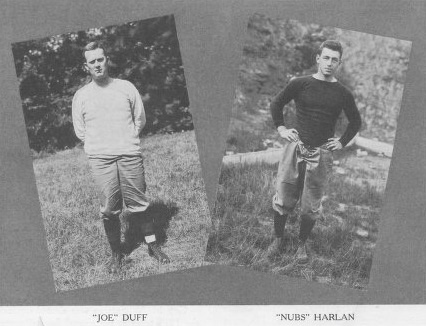

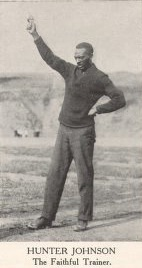

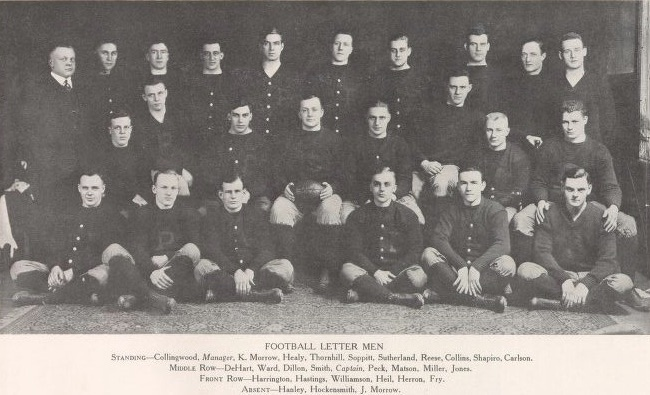

1914 Pittsburgh Panthers football roster
Player	Position	Games	Height	Weight	Class	Prep School	Degree	Residence
Wayne Smith*	guard	8	5' 9"	200	1915	Bellefonte Academy	Doctor of Dental Surgery	Pittsburgh, PA
Robert Peck*	halfback	9	5' 8"	170	1917	Pawling School N.Y.	Economics	Culver, IN
Rendall Soppitt*	guard	8	6' 1"	185	1917	Greensburg H.S.	School of Mines	Latrobe, PA
Charles Reese*	end	8	6' 1"	180	1915	Bellefonte Academy	Doctor of Dental Surgery	Warren, PA
James McQuiston	guard	2	5'	175	1917	Slippery Rock Normal	Doctor of Dental Surgery	
Isadore Shapira*	center	7	5' 10"	180	1916	East Liberty Academy	Bachelor of Science in Economics	Pittsburgh, PA
Carl Hockensmith*	center	7	5' 11"	220	1916	The Kiski School	Associate Engineering	Penn Station, PA
James Jones*	tackle	9	5' 10"	155	1917	Johnstown H.S.	Associate Mine degree	Johnstown, PA
Claude Thornhill*	tackle	8	6' 0"	200	1917	Beaver H.S.	School of Mines	Berkeley, CA
John B. Sutherland*	tackle	8	6' 2”	175	1917	Oberlin Academy	Doctor of Dental Surgery	Pittsburgh, PA
Ralph N. Clicquennoi	tackle	1	6'	170	1918	Warren H.S.	Economics	Kinzua, PA
James P. Herron*	end	9	5' 10"	135	1915	Monessen H.S.	Bachelor of Arts	Pittsburgh, PA
H. Clifford Carlson*	end	9	5' 10"	170	1918	Bellefonte Academy	Doctor of Dental Surgery	Pittsburgh, PA
William Harrington*	end	3	5' 8"	155	1918	Conway Hall	Associate Economics	Bentlyville, PA
Joe Matson*	tackle	7	5' 11"	165	1918	Shadyside Academy	Dental School	Pittsburgh, PA
Thomas Healy*	end	3	5' 10"	150	1917	St. Francis College	Doctor of Dental Surgery	Altoona, PA
Frank Rugh	halfback	0	5' 7"	145	1917	Jeannette H.S.	Economics	Jeannette, PA
Thomas J. Beattie	tackle	1	5' 7"	150	1916	Bellefonte Academy	Doctor of Dental Surgery	Wheeling, WVA
Guy Williamson*	halfback	5	5' 9"	155	1916	New Mexico Military Academy	School of Mines	
Roy Heil*	quarterback	6	5' 6"	135	1916	Topeka, (Kan.) H.S.	Doctor of Dental Surgery	Topeka, KS
Fred Ward*	halfback	6	5' 7"	150	1916	New Kensington H.S.	Doctor of Dental Surgery	Beaver Falls, PA
James DeHart*	halfback	8	5' 6"	150	1918	Reynoldsville H.S.	Associate College	Reynoldsville, PA
Charles “Andy” Hastings*	halfback	8	5' 9"	170	1918	Brookville H.S.	Economics	Wilkinsburg, PA
William H. Miller*	halfback	9	5' 7"	155	1918	Wyoming Seminary (Kingston, PA)	Economics	Gilberton, PA
Philip Dillon*	halfback	6	5' 7"	170	1916	Bellefonte Academy	Associate Mining	Ellsworth, PA
Karl C. Morrow*	halfback	6	5' 10"	155	1918	Indiana State Normal (PA)	Associate Economics	Clymer, PA
John S. Morrow*	halfback	2	5' 9"	155	1919	Pittsburgh H.S.	Economics	Pittsburgh, PA
Leo Collins*	end	6	5' 10"	180	1915	East Pittsburgh H.S.	Bachelor of Laws	East Pittsburgh, PA
George K. Fry*	fullback	6	5' 11"	165	1917	Rochester H.S.	Associate College	Rochester, PA
Edward T. Hanley*	fullback	7	5' 10"	170	1917	East High (Cleveland, OH)	Associate Dental	Cleveland, OH
* Lettermen

== Game summaries ==
=== At Cornell ===
Week 1: Pitt at Cornell

Team	1	2	3	4	Total
• Pitt	6	0	0	3	9
Cornell	3	0	0	0	3

- Date: September 26, 1914
- Location: Percy Field
  Ithaca, NY
- Game start: 2:00 p.m.
- Referee: J. A. Evans (Williams)

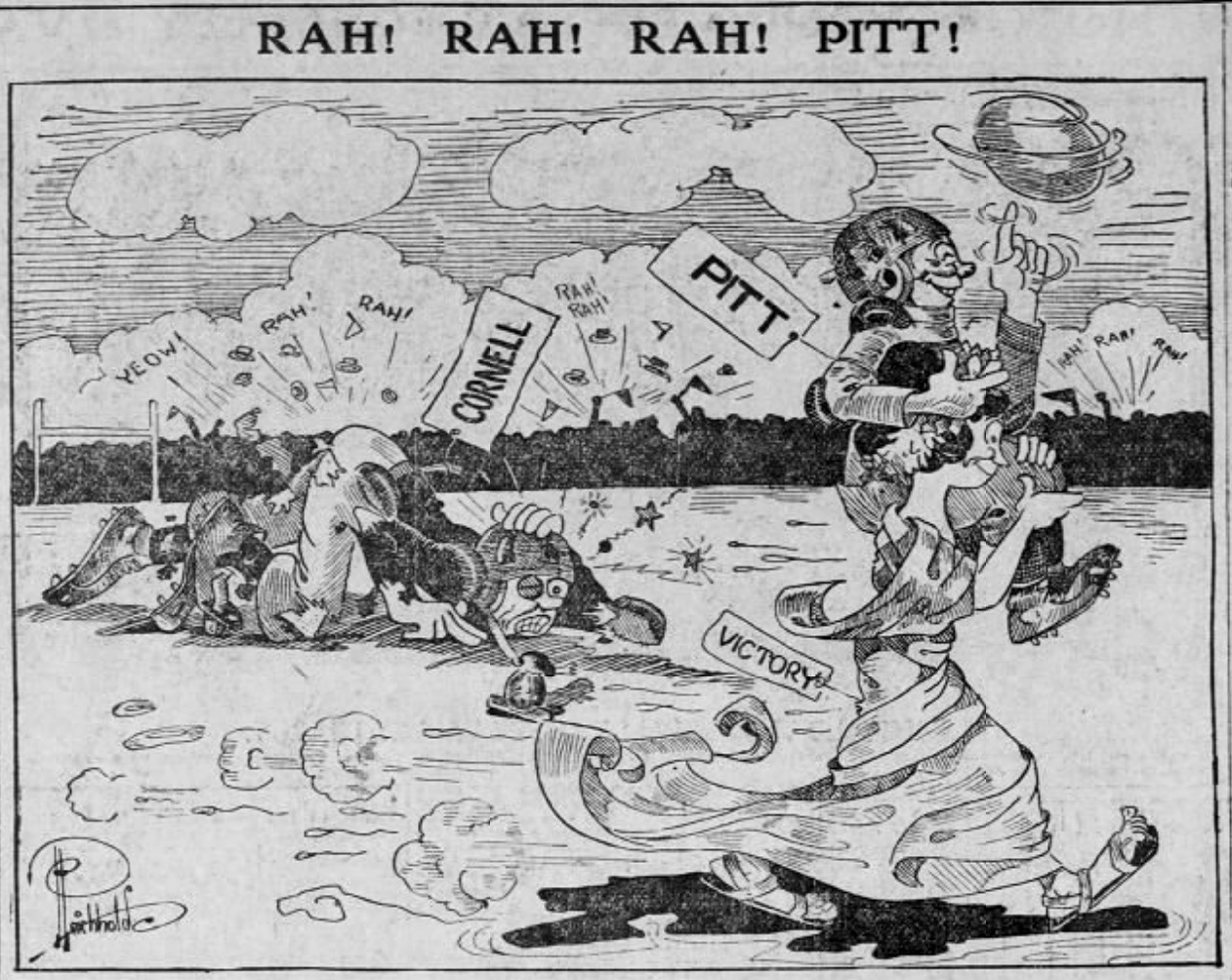
Cartoonist's Impression of 1914 Pitt vs. Cornell game

To kick-off the 1914 season, the Pitt team traveled to Ithaca, NY to take on the Big Red of Cornell on Saturday, September 26. Cornell was led by third year coach Albert Sharpe and came into this game with a 1–0 record, having beaten Ursinus 28 to 0 on September 23. Cornell would finish the season with an 8–2 record. This would be the last football game played between these two schools. Pitt had a 2–4 all-time record against the Big Red.

The Pittsburgh Press reported: "Displaying at times a mid-season form that dazzled her opponents and taking advantage of every Cornell misplay, the University of Pittsburgh football eleven duplicated its performance of one year ago and sent Cornell down to defeat here this afternoon by a score of 9–3....the visiting team clearly outclassed the Cornell machine in all-round football, and pulled away with another victory that was even more unexpected than that of last season."

Pitt received the opening kick-off and fullback Edward Hanley fumbled on first down and Cornell recovered on the Pitt 32-yard line. The Cornell offensive backs "Barrett and Taber took turns hammering the Pitt line until in less time than it takes to tell, Cornell had the ball on the visitor's 10-yard line." "After Taber was thrown for a loss.... Barrett dropped back from the ten-yard line and booted the ball between the uprights." Cornell led 3 to 0 after three minutes of play. Pitt kicked off and forced the Big Red to punt. Guy Williamson received the ball on his 30-yard line. "Running like the wind, dodging, sidestepping, and stiff-arming, the Pitt quarterback worked his way down the field behind an interference that was really remarkable. The last guardian of the Cornell goal was bowled over by an avalanche of blue-and-gold-stockinged athletes." Pitt led 6 to 3 as Andy Hastings missed the point after.

The second and third quarters were scoreless as both teams possessions see-sawed between the thirty yard lines. "Seven Cornell men were put out of the running before the final whistle blew...It was the power and aggressiveness of the Pitt interference that put so many of the local players hors de combat." In each quarter Pitt advanced the ball inside the Cornell 20-yard line. A fumble thwarted the second quarter drive. In the third period Pitt Captain Smith picked up a Taber fumble and raced 50 yards to the end zone. "After considerable discussion, the ball was brought back and the Ithacans were penalized ten yards for grounding the pass behind the line of scrimmage." The Pitt defense held and the offense then advanced the ball to the 10-yard line of Cornell and turned it over on downs.

Pitt extended its lead to 9 to 3 with another Hastings field goal early in the fourth quarter. "Then Cornell pulled together and by a series of viscous assaults, carried the ball from Cornell's 25-yard line to the visitors' one yard line...Cornell was finally halted by the desperate resistance of the Pitt line." "For the second consecutive year, the Pitt football team brought joy to the hearts of its followers and gloom to the Cornell rooters by winning a hard earned victory over the Ithacans."

The Pitt lineup for the game against Cornell was H. Clifford Carlson (left end), Claude E. Thornhill (left tackle), Wayne Smith (left guard), Bob Peck (center), Charles Reese (right guard), James Jones (right tackle), James P. Herron (right end), Guy Williamson (quarterback), Andy Hastings (left halfback), William Miller (right halfback), and Edward Hanley (fullback). Substitutions made during the game were: Jimmy DeHart replaced Andy Hastings at left halfback and Rendall Soppitt replaced Wayne Smith at left guard. The game was played in 12-minute periods.

=== Westminster ===
Week 2: Westminster at Pitt

Team	1	2	3	4	Total
Westminster	3	0	7	0	10
• Pitt	7	7	7	0	21

- Date: October 3, 1914
- Location: D. C. & A.C. Park
  Wilkinsburg, PA
- Game start: 3:00 p.m.
- Referee: Harry S. Hammond (Michigan)

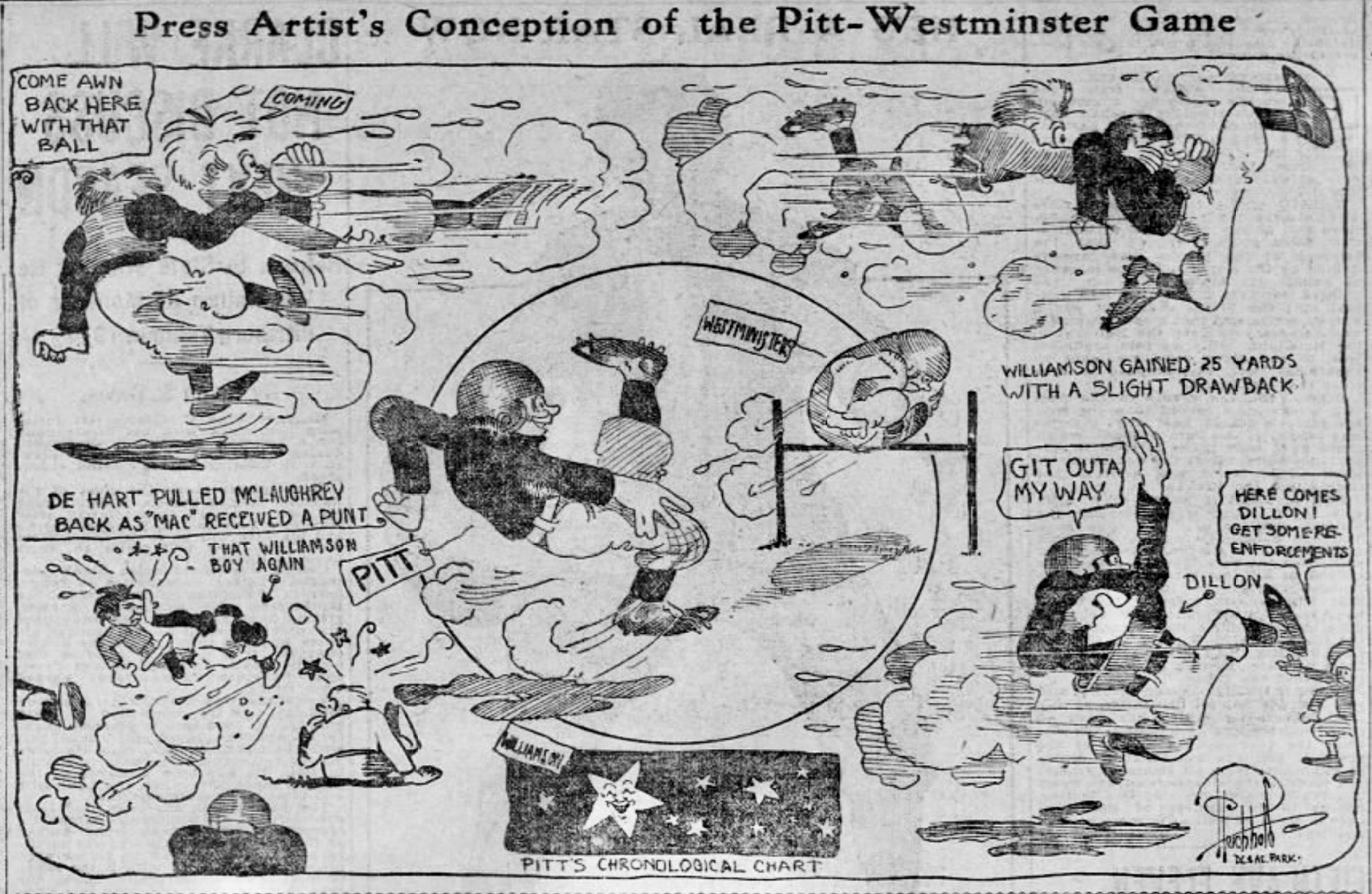
Ralph Reichhold's cartoon analysis of the 1914 Pitt vs. Westminster game

For week two of the 1914 season, the Titans of Westminster College from New Wilmington, PA arrived in Pittsburgh to try to win their first game ever against the Pitt eleven. The previous week the Titans lost to a strong State College team 13 to 0.

The Pittsburgh Daily Post warned "Coach Duff of Pitt is preparing for a very strenuous clash with Westminster College tomorrow. Pitt has not been taking things easy this week and every effort has been made to preclude any feeling of overconfidence"

The Pitt Weekly countered: "Pitt's rooters met with a large degree of disappointment last Saturday, when Westminster held the varsity to a 21–10 score in a raggedly played game...The game was the opening event of Pitt's home season, and the disappointment was all the more keen because of the fact that Pitt men were inclined to be overconfident of the result."

Pitt received the opening kick-off and on second down halfback William Miller fumbled on the Pitt twelve yard line. Westminster gained nothing on first and second down. On third down quarterback "Buckley then dropped back to the 30-yard line and sent the ball sailing through the goal posts for a placement tally." Westminster led 3 to 0. The Pitt offense worked the ball to midfield and fumbled again. Westminster punted and the Pitt offense advanced the ball back to midfield. "(Guy) Williamson made a spectacular run to the 15-yard line. (Charles) Hastings was sent through tackle for a touchdown. He also kicked goal." Pitt led 7 to 3 at the end of the first quarter.

Early in the second quarter, "(Guy) Williamson punted to Buckley on Westminster's 10-yard line. Buckley fumbled the ball and it bounced into (James) DeHart's hands and he ran for a touchdown. Hastings kicked goal." Pitt led 14–3.

In the third quarter, Williamson "shot another forward pass to "Stevie" Dillon, who had been sent into the game, and the old war horse ran 25 yards for a touchdown. Williamson kicked goal, making the score 21–3." Westminster scored their touchdown after Stewart blocked a Williamson punt that was recovered on the Pitt 3-yard line. On third down fullback McLaughrey plunged into the end zone for the score. Buckley kicked goal. The fourth quarter was scoreless and the game ended 21 to 10.

The Pitt lineup for the game against Westminster was H. Clifford Carlson (left end), Claude Thornhill (left tackle), Wayne Smith (left guard), Robert Peck (center), Charles Reese (right guard), James Jones (right tackle), James Herron (right end), Guy Williamson (quarterback), Charles Hastings (left halfback), William Miller (right halfback), and Edward Hanley (fullback). Substitutes that played were: Isadore Shapira, James DeHart, Rendall Soppitt, John Sutherland, Philip Dillon, Karl Morrow, Joe Matson, Leo Collins, Harry McCarter, James McQuiston, and Fred Ward. The game was played in 12-minute quarters.

=== Navy ===
Week 3: Pitt at Navy

Team	1	2	3	4	Total
• Pitt	7	0	6	0	13
Navy	0	0	6	0	6

- Date: October 10, 1914
- Location: Worden Field
  Annapolis, MD
- Game start: 2:30 p.m.
- Referee: James H. Moffatt (Princeton)

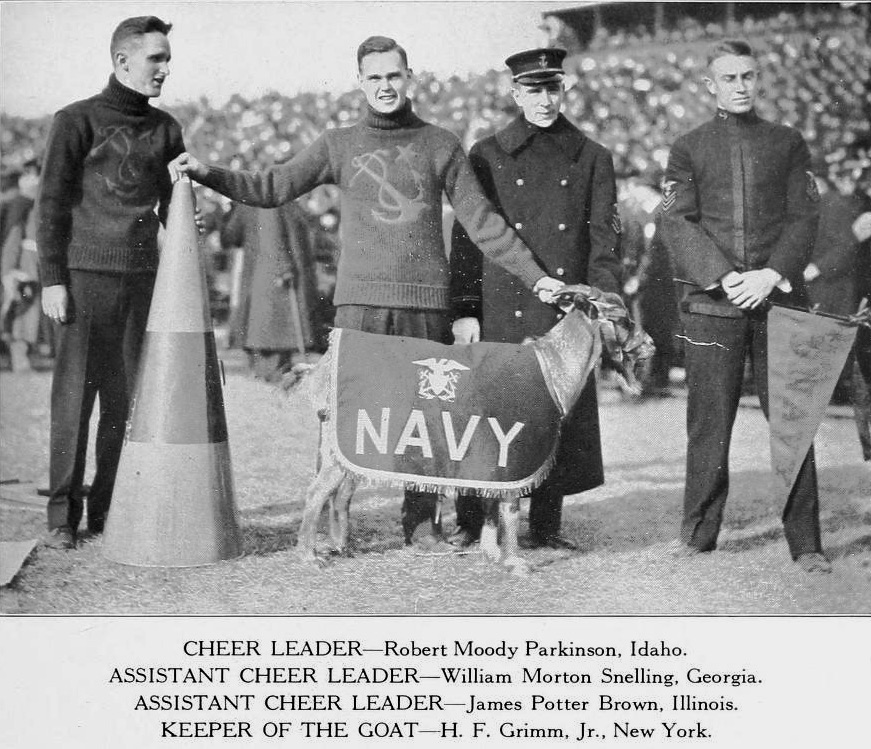
1914 Navy cheerleaders and mascot

For the third year in a row the Pitt contingent traveled to Annapolis, MD to battle the Midshipmen of Navy. Coach Douglas Legate Howard was in his fourth year and led the team to a 6–3 record. The Midshipmen came into the Pitt game having beaten Georgetown 13 to 0 the previous week.

The Pitt Weekly was more upbeat after this victory:

"Fighting with their characteristic "last ditch" spirit, the Blue and Gold won a victory over the powerful Navy team, last Saturday, at Annapolis by a score of 13–6. The result was in doubt from the first whistle to the last, and only the sturdiest sort of a fight enabled the Varsity to hold their lead to the end."

The Baltimore Sun praised Pitt:

"Fulfilling expectations, the Navy-Pittsburgh University football game here today developed into one of the hottest contests seen on a local gridiron for a long time, and the lads from the Smoky City emerged from the fray victors, 13–6....Last season, with a team that showed every sign of a coming aggregation, they played the Middies to a scoreless tie in the opening game for Uncle Sam's sea-fighters, and having suffered only slight losses by graduation they have assembled this year a football machine that is calculated to give any of the big teams a stiff rub. Conquerors of Cornell last Saturday, they invaded the Middies lair with every confidence in their ability and they found that it was not by any means displaced. Playing much open football, with a varied attack and a stubborn defense, the Pennsylvanians were able to master every situation of the game."

Near the end of the first quarter, Pitt secured possession on Navy's 45-yard line. "On first down Miller sprinted around end for 20 yards before he was thrown." Another first down advanced the ball to the 15-yard line. "Williamson passed to Herron for a 12 yard gain landing the ball on the Middies 3-yard line." On second down "Williamson fell across the line between tackle and guard." Hastings kicked the goal and Pitt led 7–0.

Early in the second quarter, the Navy offense advanced the ball to the Pitt 3-yard line but turned it over on downs. A few plays later Pitt quarterback Guy Williamson hurt his leg trying to scamper around the Navy end. Roy Heil replaced him for the remainder of the first half. Pitt led at halftime 7 to 0.

At the start of the third quarter Navy punted to Pitt. "Williamson, (back in the game) charging in on Blodgett's punt, juggled the ball and Overesch recovered for Navy on the visitor's 45-yard line." "Navy carried the ball to Pittsburgh's 30-yard mark. Here the visitors braced and it was at this juncture that Mitchell essayed a beautiful forward pass to Overesch. The Navy Captain was on a dead run, and turning, caught the fast sailing pigskin under his left arm. He was directly in front of the goal line and almost instantaneously was brought to earth. In the fall he went across the mark." The goal after failed and Pitt led 7 to 6. DeHart replaced a limping Williamson. After a Pitt punt, Navy lined up to punt it back. "The whole Pitt line charged through and blocked Blodgett's attempted punt on Navy's first play and Peck taking the ball from the air cleared the crowd and registered Pitt's second touchdown." Hastings missed the goal after and Pitt led 13–6.

"Throughout the fourth and last period Navy made tremendous but futile efforts to crush Pitt's defense, finally advancing the ball to the Varsity's 12-yard line. Here the line held, and Vail's pass to Overesch was intercepted by Miller." Pitt beat the Midshipmen 13 to 6 and were 3–0 on the season.

The Pitt lineup for the game against Navy was H. Clifford Carlson (left end), "Tiny" Thornhill (left tackle), Wayne Smith (left guard), Bob Peck (center), Chuck Reese (right guard), James Jones (right tackle), James Herron (right end), Guy Williamson (quarterback), Charles Hastings (left halfback), William Miller (right halfback), and Edward Hanley (fullback). The following players were substituted during the game: Carl Hockensmith, Karl Morrow, Roy Heil, James DeHart, Isadore Shapira, John Sutherland, and Leo Collins. The game was played in 12-minute quarters.

=== Carlisle ===
Week 4: Carlisle at Pitt

Team	1	2	3	4	Total
Carlisle	0	0	0	3	3
• Pitt	3	7	0	0	10

- Date: October 17, 1914
- Location: Forbes Field
  Pittsburgh, PA
- Game start: 3:00 p.m.
- Referee: William J. Langford (Trinity)

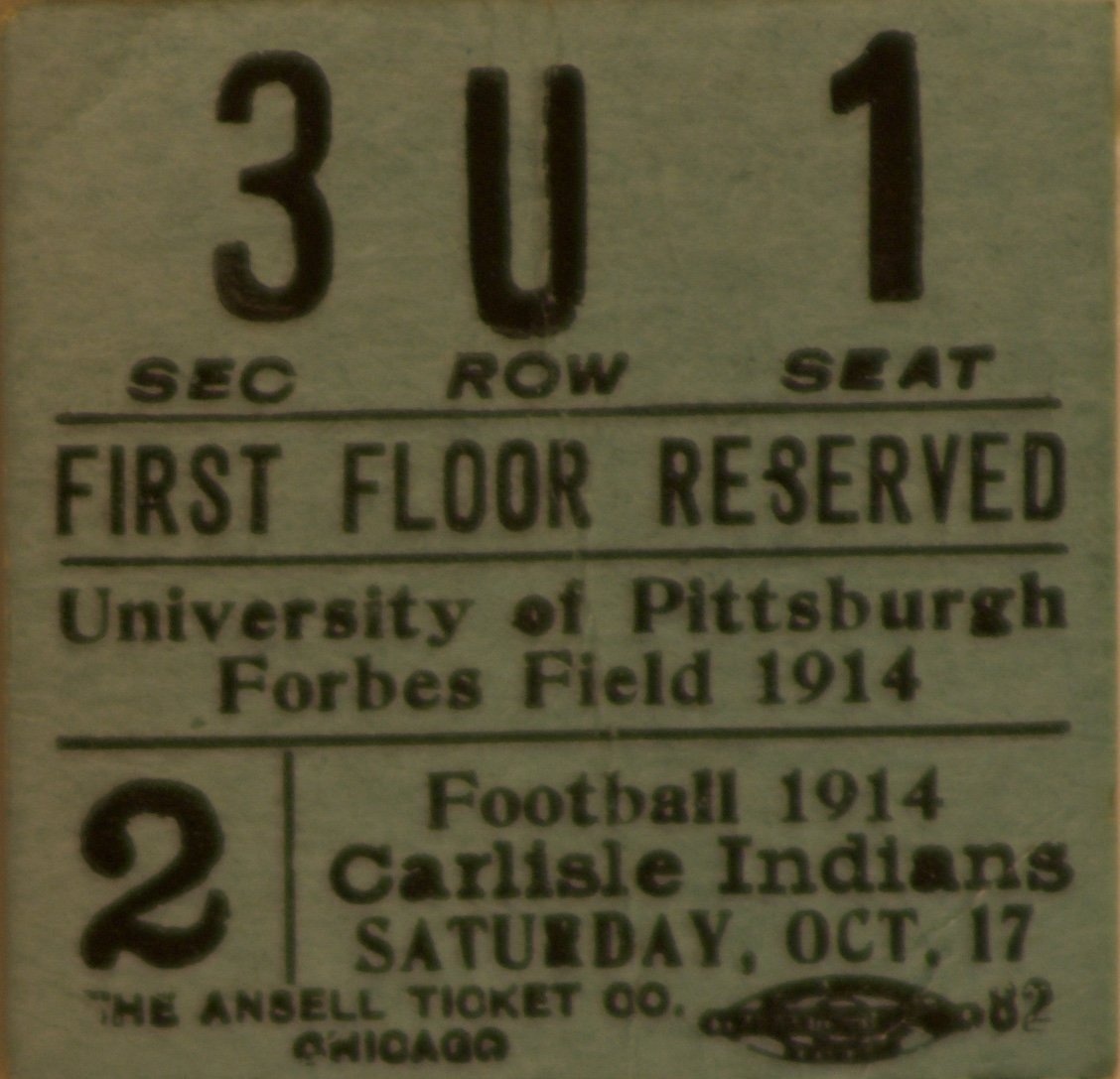
1914 Ticket stub from Pitt vs Carlisle game

On October 17, Pop Warner, in his thirteenth and last season as the Carlisle coach, brought his team to Pittsburgh for the opening game at Forbes Field. The Indians sported a 3–2 record on the season, having won their first three and losing the last two. To compound matters, "on the eve of one of the hardest games on the schedule Carlisle Captain Busch, right guard, was forced to resign for the good of the team. The drastic action was taken at the suggestion of the coaches. The injuries suffered recently and the change in the team will naturally cause a lack of teamwork in the game Saturday."

Pitt was healthy except for Guy Williamson at quarterback. He was replaced by James DeHart and Roy Heil.

The Pitt Weekly was again subdued in their praise: "The expected happened last Saturday in Pitt's victory over the Indians. The score of 10–3 is some what disappointing to those Pitt men who had anticipated victory by a wider margin; but the varsity was evidently under wraps, and the redskins failure to apply harder pressure kept the Blue and Gold from working too hard."

The Carlisle Evening Herald was blunt: "The University of Pittsburgh football team defeated the Carlisle Indians Saturday by a score of 10–3 in a game that was marked by mediocre play on the part of both teams."

Florent Gibson of The Pittsburgh Sunday Post reported: "Beating the Carlisle Indians is a solemn duty which the blue-clad gridders of Old Pitt owe their Alma Mater; furthermore it's become a habit, and one might say it's reprehensible only in that it sends a saddened bunch of aborigines back to that dear Carlisle. Last year Pitt beat the Indians by two touchdowns to one, thus establishing a precedent, for it was the first time a redskin advance had been rolled back by a Pitt eleven. But yesterday the Pittites won again, thus turning a precedent into a well-defined habit. The score was 10–3. Now if Pitt wins next year, beating the Indians will have become a traditional custom, and the spectators no longer will fare forth to Forbes Field to see Pitt ripped up the back by the Original Inhabitants."

Pitt received the opening kick-off and advanced the ball to midfield where the Carlisle defense forced a punt. Andy Hastings punted into the end zone and Carlisle had first down on the 20-yard line. Halfback Broker fumbled on first down and Leo Collins recovered for Pitt. On fourth down, "Hastings dropped the ball over from the 25-yard line." Pitt led 3 to 0.

Early in the second quarter, "the Indians were knocking at the Pitt goal line. Fullback Pete Calac made a perfect peg of 25-yards to F. Broker, who was standing on the very goal line. The Indian halfback gobbled it up and fell over the line to be smothered under an avalanche of blue jerseys. It was a sure-nuff touchdown, only some eagle-eyed official had diagnosed a case of holding in the Carlisle line as the Zeppelin was launched, and the touchdown was disallowed." The Pitt defense stiffened and regained possession. Whitey Miller fumbled and Carlisle recovered on Pitt's 32-yard line. Pitt's defense held and Pete Calac missed a 35-yard field goal. Pitt had possession on their 20-yard line. DeHart, Miller and Collins rushed the ball downfield to the Carlisle 27-yard line. "Here DeHart took the ball and skirted the end behind good interference. Dodging tackler after tackler, finally worming out of the grasp of Calac, "Jimmy" shot over the redskins' goal for a touchdown, assuring Pitt of its second consecutive victory over the Carlisle aggregation." Pitt led 10 to 0 at halftime.

"The third quarter was almost featureless being occupied by advances and retreats by both teams." Near the end of the final period, Carlisle gained possession at midfield. Calac and Pratt advanced the ball to the Pitt 20-yard line. The Pitt defense held and Calac was successful on a 30 yard field goal to close the scoring. "Pitt had possession on Carlisle's 13-yard line when the whistle blew ending the combat."

The Pitt lineup for the game against Carlisle was H. Clifford Carlson (left end), John Sutherland (left tackle), Wayne Smith (left guard), Bob Peck (center), Chuck Reese (right guard), Carl Hockensmith (right tackle), James Herron (right end), James DeHart (quarterback), Andy Hastings (left halfback), Whitey Miller (right halfback), and Leo Collins (fullback). The following players were substituted during the game: James Jones, Isadore Shapira, Rendall Soppitt, Joe Matson, William Harrington, Roy Heil, Cliff Morrow, Stevie Dillon, George Fry, and Edward Hanley. The game was played in 15-minute quarters.

=== Georgetown ===
Week 5: Georgetown at Pitt

Team	1	2	3	4	Total
Georgetown	0	0	0	0	0
• Pitt	7	0	7	7	21

- Date: October 24, 1914
- Location: Forbes Field
  Pittsburgh, PA
- Game start: 3:00 p.m.
- Referee: Frank S. Bergin (Princeton)

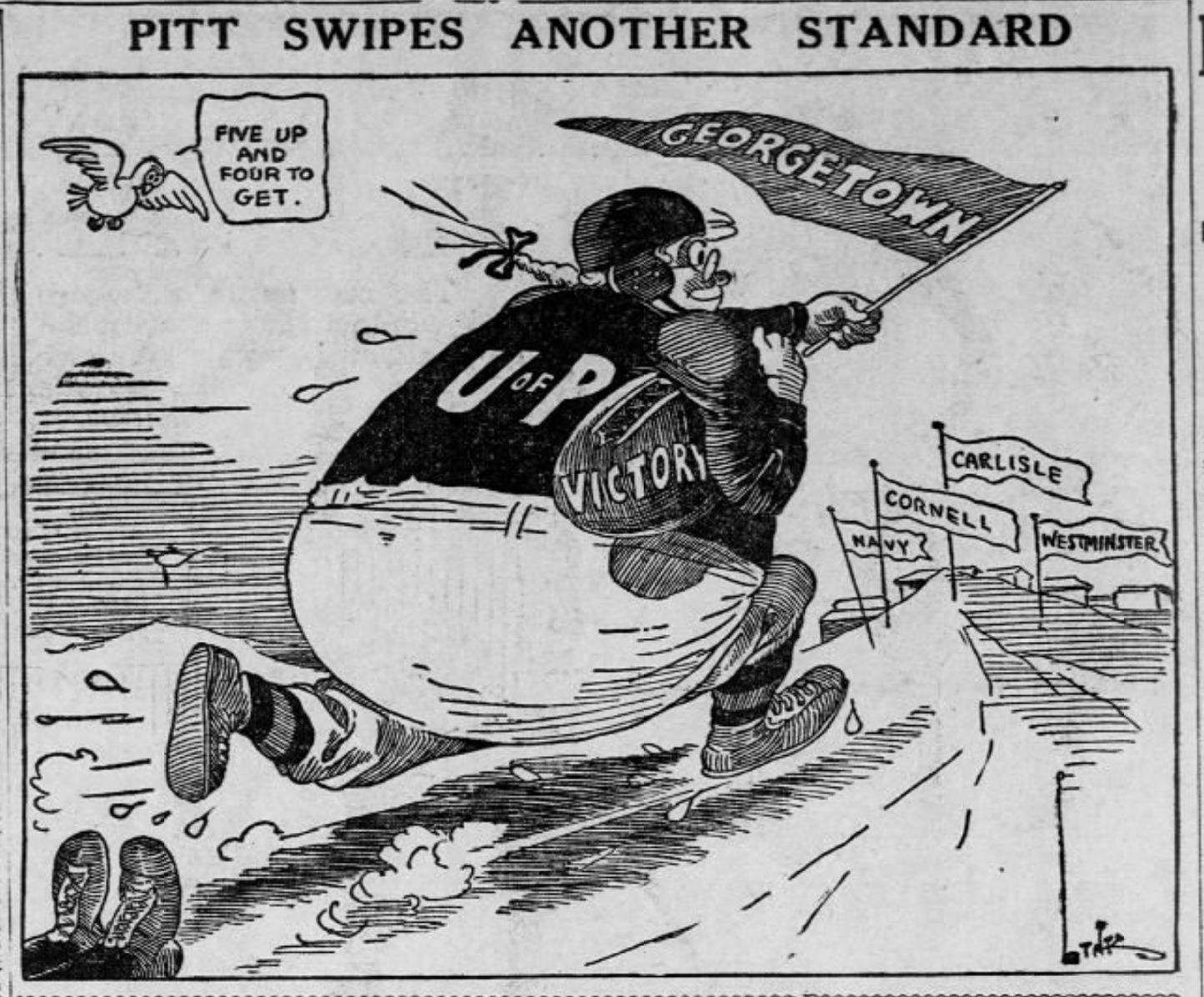
Cartoon celebrating Pitt's 1914 victory over Georgetown

On October 24 "with a record of four victories and no defeats, Pitt clashed with the representatives of Georgetown University, in the first game played between these two institutions since 1910, when "Tex” Richards' team triumphed over the Washingtonians by a count of 17–0." The Blue and Gray came into Pittsburgh 0–2–1 under first year coach Albert Exendine and would finish the season with a 2–4–2 record.

The Washington Post was not impressed with Pitt: "The score of 21–0, in the football game between the University of Pittsburgh and Georgetown University, here today, does not indicate the difference in the strength or ability of these teams. The visitors gave Pitt the biggest scare of the season, especially in the second period of play, when they outplayed their heavier opponents, and caused Coach Duff to send in reinforcements at every turn."

Nor was Charles R. Cox, Georgetown's Graduate Manager of Athletics: "Georgetown was again unfortunate in today's game. A fumble, an intercepted forward pass, and a block kick resulted in three touchdowns for Pittsburgh, the only scores of the game. In three periods Georgetown clearly outplayed the heavy Pitt team, but breaks in the game were against us. Three times Georgetown had the ball inside the ten-yard line, only to lose it on fumbles. I do not want to detract from Pitt's victory, for they scored the most points and won the game, but each score was made on a long run and cannot be considered earned."

Richard Guy of The Gazette Times seemed to agree: "The score can not be accepted as a criterion as to the relative strength of the two teams on the field yesterday. The game abounded in possibilities for scoring, especially for Georgetown, but the visiting team had an attack which failed to penetrate the Pitt defense when the chances were presented. Except for staving off the Georgetown assaults, the Pitt line was practically useless. On the offense it was very weak and through its inability to help perform its functions the ball was kept in the Pitt territory the greater part of the while."

Pitt received the kick-off and after making a first down punted to Georgetown. On second down Georgetown halfback Kelly fumbled and Andy Hastings "nailed the elusive pigskin and executed a clever run of some 45-yards, not stopping until he touched the ball down directly behind the goal posts. Then just to show he was versatile, he kicked the goal from touchdown and Pitt was in the lead by the score of 7–0." Georgetown spent most of the quarter in Pitt territory and missed two field goals. Pitt countered with one drive and Hastings' field goal was blocked. The Blue and Gray had the ball on the Pitt 14-yard line at the end of the first period. "The first play of the second quarter, a forward pass from Weiser, resulted in transferring the ball to Pitt. The rest of the half was uneventful."

Late in the third quarter, Pitt blocked a punt and Cliff Morrow recovered the ball at midfield. "On the first play after this, Heil was sent through right tackle and got away for a run of 47-yards for the second touchdown of the game. Fry stepped back and sent the ball between the post for the seventh point, making the score Pitt 14, Georgetown 0."

"The final quarter was marked by Hastings' beautiful try for a field goal from the Georgetown 45-yard line, the attempt failing only by inches. Georgetown brought the ball out to the 20-yard line and started play, making a first down in quick time. On the next play, Foley's pass went straight into Miller's hands, and "Foxy" rambled over the line for a touchdown, Fry kicking goal." Pitt won 21 to 0.

The Pitt Weekly confronted the negative press:

"The newspapers of Pittsburgh have severely criticized the Pitt football team. As students we resent these slanders. We have one of the best elevens in the history of the University. Without a single set-back we have defeated five teams. Look at them: Cornell, Westminster, Navy, Carlisle, Georgetown. The scores have been decisive. Despite this, the whole football organization is criticized on technicalities of form and method. Beside these criticisms are words of wonder and praise at the work of W. & J. and Penn State. The worst of this condition is that the unfavorable words of our critics here in this city are creeping under the skin of the student body like a slow poison, leaving a feeling of apathy and sapping the spirit of confidence. Our team has been criticized. That is slander. Our school spirit has been criticized. This is truth... Our cheering is wretched, field parades weak, and post-victory demonstrations entirely lacking...Let's get things moving...It can be done. Leave the playing to Coach Duff and the boys and lets take the cheering in our own hands."

The Pitt lineup for the game with Georgetown was H. Clifford Carlson (left end), “Tiny” Thornhill (left tackle), Wayne Smith (left guard), Bob Peck (center), Rendall Soppitt (right guard), Carl Hockensmith (right tackle), James Herron (right end), James DeHart (quarterback), Andy Hastings (left halfback), Whitey Miller (right halfback), and Leo Collins (fullback). The following players were substitutes during the game: James Jones, George Fry, Stevie Dillon, Cliff Morrow, Isadore Shapira, Roy Heil, Fred Ward, Thomas Healey, Joe Matson, Edward Hanley, James Morrow, and John Sutherland. The game was played in 15-minute quarters.

=== Dickinson ===
Week 6: Dickinson at Pitt

Team	1	2	3	4	Total
Dickinson	0	0	0	0	0
• Pitt	13	14	27	42	96

- Date: October 31, 1914
- Location: Forbes Field
  Pittsburgh, PA
- Game start: 2:30 p.m.
- Referee: D. W. Merriman (Geneva)

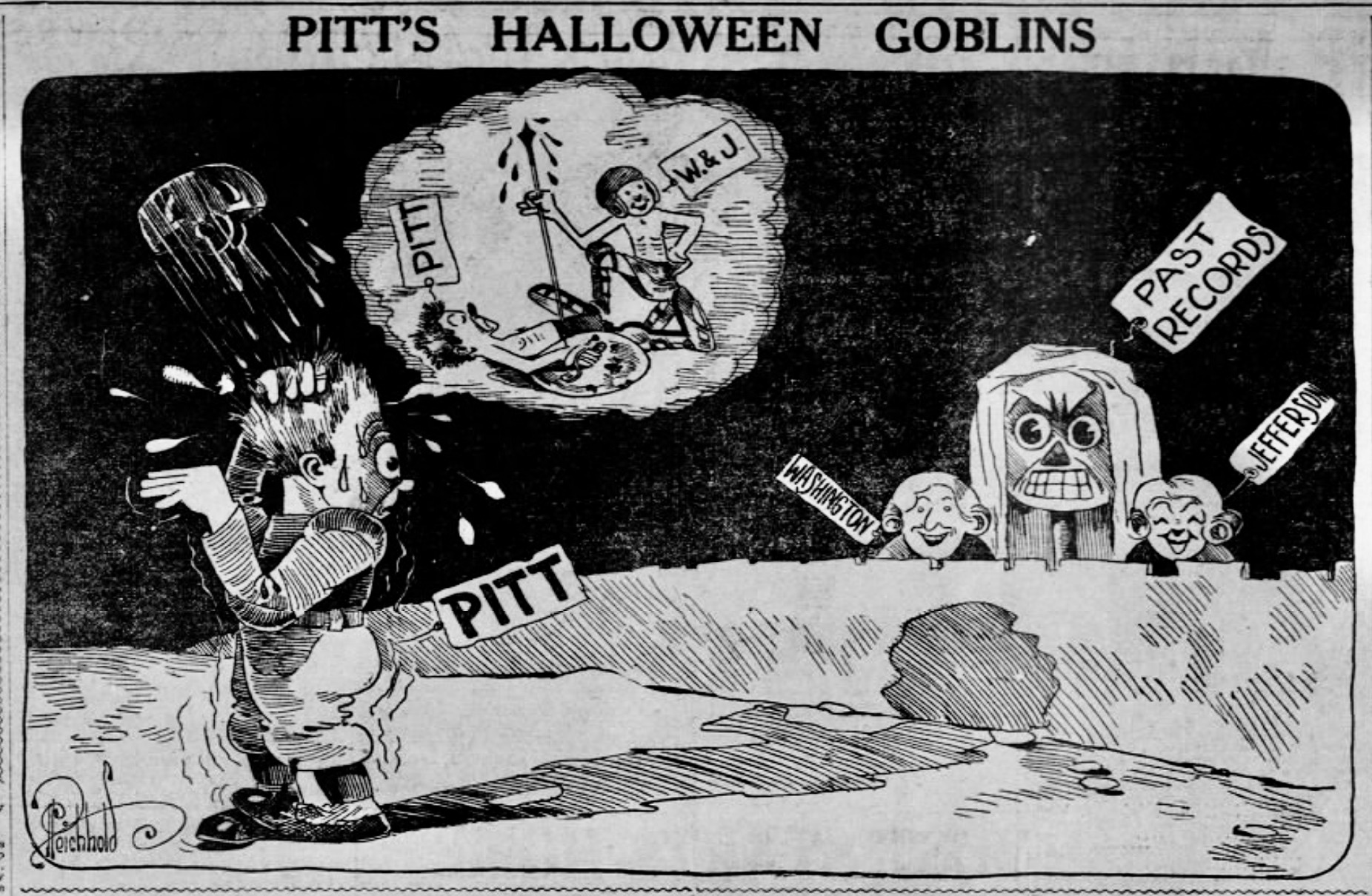
Cartoon promoting the 1914 Pitt versus W. & J. game

On Halloween, coach S. W. Harrington brought his Dickinson Red and White to Pittsburgh for the second and last time to attempt to best the unbeaten Pitt eleven. Dickinson sported a 1–3 record, having been beaten by Washington & Jefferson, 105–0. The press felt that the Red and White were much improved since that game. The Pittsburgh Post noted: "The game with Dickinson tomorrow will serve to show the condition of the team. The Dickinson game will be far from an easy one. The squad of visitors has been coached by Glenn Warner, the Indian coach, and is playing better than earlier in the season."

Pitt gave the Red and White no treats but played plenty of tricks as they "tried hard to equal W. & J.'s score against Dickinson, but fell short one touchdown, the score being 96 to 0. The local boys were like babies in the hands of the Pitt huskies, and went down like ten-pins before the rushes of Hastings, Hanley, and Dillon, while the end runs of Heil and Fry were something bewildering to the Dickinson defense."

The Pitt Weekly reported: "A small but delighted crowd of fans last Saturday saw Dickinson crushed under the Pitt avalanche by the smothering score of 96–0. In spite of the game resistance of the visitors, they never once endangered the Panther goal, and only twice succeeded in making a first down."

Pitt scored fourteen touchdowns. Andy Hastings and Stevie Dillon each scored three. George Fry and Whitey Miller each scored two. Cliff Morrow, Fred Ward, Roy Heil and Thomas Healy all scored one. George Fry connected on seven extra points and Andy Hastings added five.

The Pittsburg Press was hopeful: "This great display of real football by the wearers of the Blue and Gold sent up their stock many points for the championship contest next week with W. & J. next Saturday"

The Pitt lineup for the game against Dickinson was H. Clifford Carlson, Joe Matson and Thomas Beattie (left end), Tiny Thornhill, John Sutherland and R. N. Clicquenroi (left tackle), Wayne Smith and James McQuiston (left guard), Bob Peck and Isadore Shapira (center), Rendall Soppitt and Chuck Reese (right guard), Carl Hockensmith (right tackle), James Herron, William Harrington and Thomas Healey (right end), Roy Heil and Fred Ward (quarterback), Andy Hastings, Cliff Morrow and Stevie Dillon (left halfback), Whitey Miller and James Morrow (right halfback), and George Fry and Edward Hanley (fullback). The game was played in 15-minute quarters.

=== Washington & Jefferson ===
Week 7: Washington & Jefferson at Pitt

Team	1	2	3	4	Total
• W. & J.	0	7	6	0	13
Pitt	0	10	0	0	10

- Date: November 7, 1914
- Location: Forbes Field
  Pittsburgh, PA
- Game start: 2:30 p.m.
- Game attendance: 30,000
- Referee: Lt. H. B. Hackett (Army)

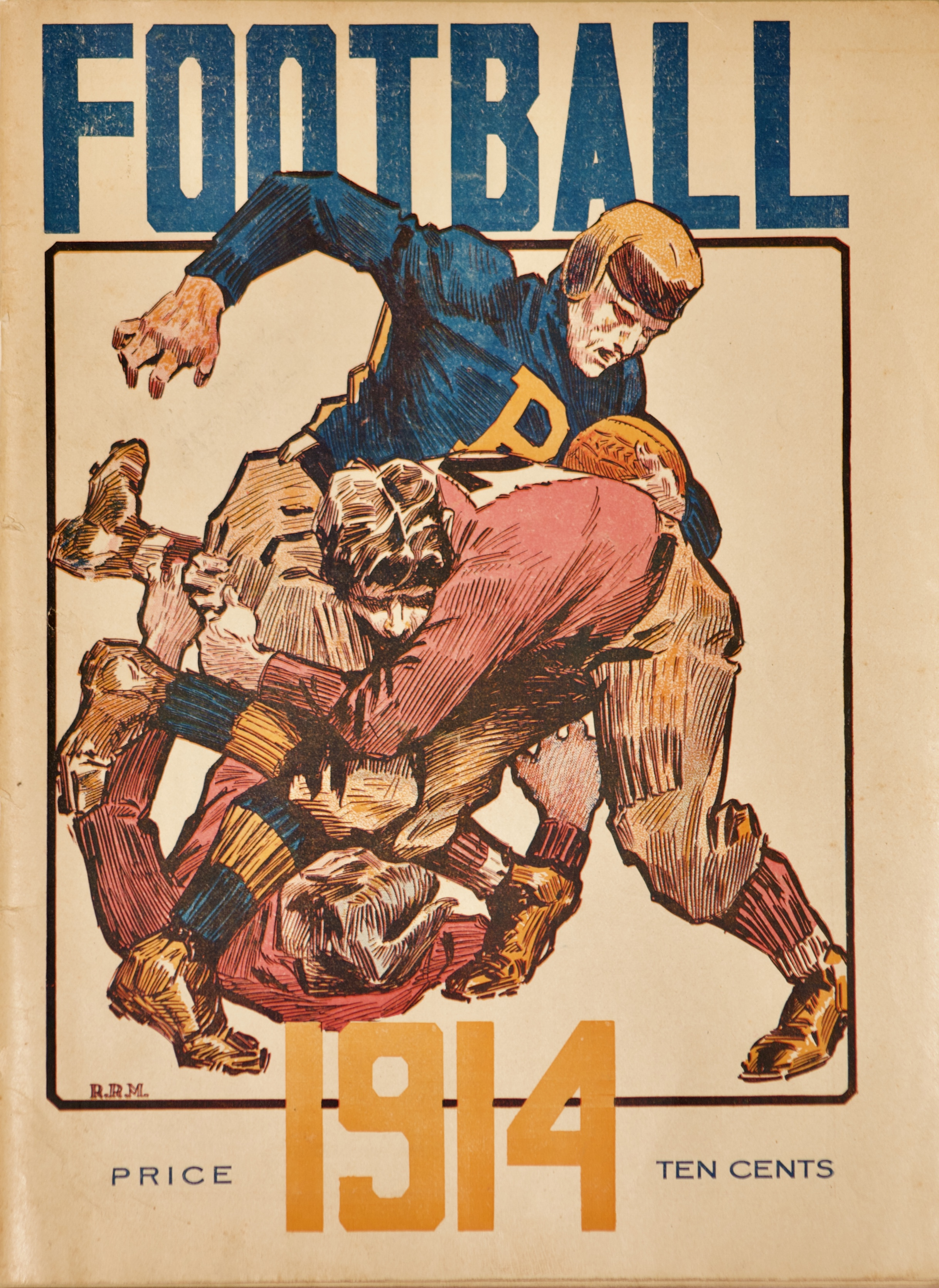
1914 fifth annual Pitt football yearbook used as game program

On November 7, third-year coach Bob Folwell brought 5–1 Washington & Jefferson to Pittsburgh for the annual battle for Western Pennsylvania football supremacy. After posting a 10–0–1 record in 1913, the 1914 squad shocked the football pundits by beating Yale, 13 to 7, and losing to Harvard by only one point, 10–9. The Red and Black lineup boasted two second team Walter Camp All-Americans – halfback Johnny Spiegel and tackle Britain Patterson and one third teamer - center Burleigh Cruikshank. W. & J.'s lineup, with eight starters who had been together 4 years, was healthy. Pitt was still missing starting quarterback Guy Williamson, but Roy Heil was an able replacement.

The Pitt Weekly set the scene: "The student bodies of both institutions will parade the downtown section before the game, and at Forbes Field the rooting argument will be second only to the debate on the field. No matter how the battle goes it will be some game. If it is Pitt's lot to lose, Pitt can be a good loser; if she wins, there is no better winner."

Richard Guy of The Gazette Times was impressed: "The Red and Black warriors from Washington & Jefferson College triumphed over the University of Pittsburgh foemen in their annual football meeting yesterday afternoon at Forbes Field, 13 to 10. The largest crowd without any exception which ever witnessed a football match in this city between two college teams viewed the combat yesterday. There were at least 30,000 persons in the park, and these people sat out over two hours while the teams furnished one of the most sensational games ever offered in Pittsburgh."

Ralph Davis of The Pittsburgh Press agreed: "While to Washington & Jefferson goes the silver loving cup emblematic of the premiership and the title in fact as well as in name, to the Pitt cohorts goes the splendid record of having baffled the wonderful Red and Black attack, and having during a great part of the game outplayed the team, which lost by one point to the Harvard Crimson, and smeared the colors of Eli Yale in the mud. Pitt was beaten but not disgraced."

At the end of the scoreless first quarter, George Fry punted to Wash-Jeff. Their fullback, Young, fumbled and Pitt end H. Clifford Carlson recovered on the Red and Black 38-yard line. On third down, "Hastings forward passed to Heil for a gain of 24 yards. After a fruitless dash into the line, Hastings dropped back to the 30-yard mark and dropped one over the crossbar giving Pitt the first score of the game." On Pitt's next possession, Andy Hastings fumbled on a fake kick attempt and Spiegel recovered for W. & J. on the Pitt 16-yard line. On second down "a forward pass McCreight to Goodwin to Bovill took the ball over for a touchdown. Patterson kicked the resultant goal, and the score was 7–3 in W. & J.'s favor." After trading fumbles, Pitt recovered another W. & J. miscue on the Red and Black 20-yard line. "A forward pass, Heil to Hastings, netted 16-yards. Heil gained one yard through the line, then Collins went over for a touchdown, from which Hastings kicked goal, making the score 10 to 7 in favor of Pitt. There was no further scoring in the first half."

"Then, when everything seemed auspicious for Pitt the jinx tore loose. Just why both (Leo) Collins and (Cliff) Morrow muffed the kick that started the second half will be a mystery for a long time. But they both let it get by, and Wesbecher was Johnny on the spot in recovering the ball on Pitt's four-yard line, whence Young speedily tore his way over the line." Score W. & J. 13 to Pitt 10. "From that point on the game was scoreless but both Pitt and Wash-Jeff exhausted every device in an effort to score."

The Pittsburg Press attempted to interview Coach Duff: "When seen in the dressing room after the game, Coach Duff of Pitt, would make no statement. "I have nothing to say. I have nothing to say," he murmured. The coach took the defeat very much to heart and his eyes betrayed the fact that he had been crying. A close friend of Duff's said that he had never seen anyone take a defeat as hard as the Pitt coach. 'He was all shot to pieces,' said the friend."

The Pitt lineup for the game against Washington & Jefferson was H. Clifford Carlson (left end), Claude Thornhill, James Jones, Joe Matson and John Sutherland (left tackle), Wayne Smith and Chuck Reese (left guard), Bob Peck, and Isadore Shapira (center), Rendall Soppitt (right guard), Carl Hockensmith (right tackle), James Herron and Thomas Healey (right end), Roy Heil (quarterback), Andy Hastings, Cliff Morrow and Jimmy DeHart (left halfback), Whitey Miller, Stevie Dillon, and Fred Ward (right halfback) and George Fry, Leo Collins and Edward Hanley (fullback). The game was played in 15-minute quarters.

All the Pittsburgh newspapers on November 8, 1914 covered the Wash- Jeff game and also carried a breaking news story of note to the Pitt faithful. The Pittsburgh Sunday Post reported:

"Glenn S. Warner, the great gridiron general, who has made in seasons past the name of the Carlisle Indians a thing to strike terror in the hearts of opposing elevens, may coach the University of Pittsburg eleven next fall. That the Carlisle coach was considering a tempting offer made by the local school was admitted by the Pitt athletic authorities last night, but it was declared that Warner had yet to sign a contract. The story leaked out in a roundabout way, and the announcement is rather premature. Warner, it seems, told a Dickinson player that he had been dickering with the Blue and Gold. This Dickinson man was not too busy to tell a Pitt player about it during the Pitt – Dickinson game. The Pitt player spilled this story, and the athletic authorities, charged with this misdemeanor, owned up. One of the members of the Pitt athletic committee last night declared that the proposed change was not because Pitt is dissatisfied with the work of Joe Duff, but because it is believed that Pitt would be even better off with Warner than Duff at the head of affairs here. "We believe we have the greatest bunch of football material in the country at Pitt now, and we want the greatest football general of the country to handle them for us." is the way it was expressed. And Warner is a wizard at bringing out latent ability in his proteges, whether red or white."

=== Carnegie Tech ===
Week 8: Carnegie Tech at Pitt

Team	1	2	3	4	Total
Carnegie Tech	0	0	0	0	0
• Pitt	7	0	7	0	14

- Date: November 14, 1914
- Location: Forbes Field
  Pittsburgh, PA
- Game start: 2:30 p.m.
- Referee: Harry S. Hammond (Michigan)

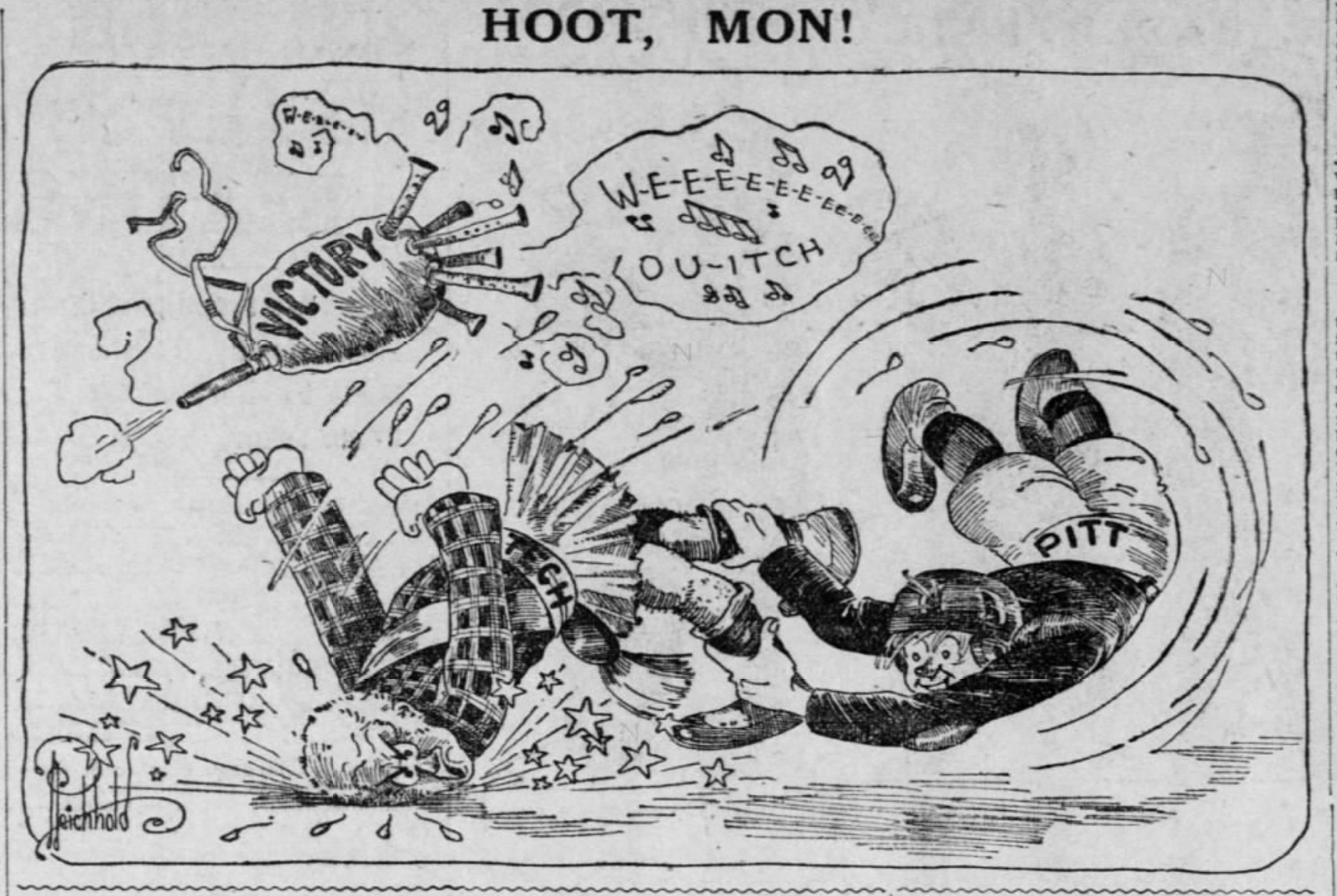
Ralph Reichhold illustration for the 1914 Pitt vs. Carnegie Tech game

On November 14, the fifth city battle with Carnegie Tech was played at Forbes Field. Pitt had played and beaten Carnegie Tech four times previously and out scored them 94 to 0. The two neighboring schools had not played since 1910. Tech hired former University of Chicago All-American quarterback Walter Steffen as coach for the 1914 season and Tech's football fortunes improved.

Pitt's lineup for this game was missing Captain Wayne Smith (fractured ankle) and Andy Hastings (broken finger). Guy Williamson was still questionable for this game but would be ready for the Penn State game.

Pitt won the game 14 to 0 but the newspapers praised the Tartans for holding the score down. L.G. Boggs of The Pittsburg Press noted: "An intercepted forward pass and a fumble were the main reasons for the defeat of Carnegie Tech at the hands of the Pitt eleven at Forbes Field yesterday in a game which was close and hard-fought, and which kept the rather small crowd on edge during the entire playing time."

The Pitt Weekly agreed: "Pitt defeated Carnegie Tech, Saturday, by a score of 14 to 0. The Plaid warriors sprang a surprise and Pitt was forced to hustle to defeat them. An intercepted forward pass and a fumble caused the downfall of the Skibos. Although Pitt did not play up to the form displayed in the W. & J. game, it should not follow that any credit should be taken away from Tech. The final count, although low, does not give due credit to the plucky fight put up by Steffen's men."

Pitt's scores came in the first and third quarters. Late in the first period Pitt halfback Whitey Miller fumbled and Tech recovered on the Pitt 25-yard line. On second down, "Kesner tried a forward pass and (Bob) Peck intercepted it on Pitt's 25-yard line and ran 75 yards for a touchdown. (Roy) Heil kicked the ball out to (George) Fry and Fry then kicked the goal, making the count 7–0 for the Blue and Gold." Then in the third quarter - "Tech had the ball on its 29-yard line and Kesner faked a forward pass, holding the ball in the palm of his right hand for Marshall to take and run the end. But just as Marshall was in the act of reaching for it (Randall) Soppitt broke through, spoiled the play and was the first to grab the ball. He ran to the Tech 10-yard line. In a few plays (George) Fry went through the right side of the Tech line for a touchdown. He kicked goal and the score was 14 to 0 at which figure it remained until the end."

The Pitt lineup for the game against Carnegie Tech was H. Clifford Carlson and Joe Matson (left end), James Jones and Claude Thornhill (left tackle), Chuck Reese (left guard), Bob Peck and Isadore Shapira (center), Rendall Soppitt (right guard), Carl Hockensmith and John Sutherland (right tackle), James Herron (right end), Roy Heil, Fred Ward and Guy Williamson (quarterback), Stevie Dillon and Jimmy DeHart (left halfback), Whitey Miller (right halfback), and George Fry and Leo Collins (fullback). The game was played in 15-minute quarters.

=== Penn State ===
Week 9: Penn State at Pitt

Team	1	2	3	4	Total
Penn State	0	0	0	3	3
• Pitt	0	0	10	3	13

- Date: November 27, 1914
- Location: Forbes Field
  Pittsburgh, PA
- Game start: 2:30 p.m.
- Game attendance: 17,000
- Referee: William S. Langford (Trinity)

On November 26, Bill Hollenback brought his 1914 Nittany Lions to Pittsburgh for the annual Thanksgiving Day game with the Pitt eleven. The Lions were 5–2–1, but on a two game losing streak. "The slump is directly traceable to the accident which put Captain Tobin, the brains of the State eleven and the best individual player on the squad out of business. The gasoline explosion at the celebration following the Harvard game almost put Tobin out of football for good, but the State leader is ready for today's fray, and has been shifted to quarterback."

For Coach Duff's final game as Pitt coach, Guy Williamson was back at quarterback but Captain Wayne Smith was on the sideline nursing his fractured ankle.

Ralph S. Davis of The Pittsburgh Press said it best: "The University of Pittsburgh closed its football season yesterday in a blaze of glory, winning over the husky Penn State eleven by the decisive score of 13 to 3. Pitt outplayed her opponents in practically every department of the game."

The Pitt Weekly reported: "In one of the most desperately fought games ever played on any gridiron, Pitt defeated State on Thanksgiving Day by a score of 13 to 3. Pitt's victory, the second in two years, was clean-cut and decisive, the Varsity holding an advantage over their rivals in every department. The game was played before the usual large crowd, under perfect weather conditions."

The first half ended scoreless. "Although Pitt several times threatened to score in the first half, the State gridders set their teeth, fought back stubbornly and were able to stave off the advance until after halftime. They even once got perilously near Pitt's last line."

Pitt received the second half kick-off and advanced the ball to the State 21-yard line. "(Andy) Hastings went back to the 34-yard line and, with men rushing upon him, calmly dropkicked through the bars for Pitt's first three points." Pitt received the kick-off but the State defense held. "Guy Williamson punted to Tobin on the State 35-yard line. He fumbled and (Whitey) Miller recovered on the 23-yard line. Eleven plays later it was fourth down and the ball rested on the 6 inch line. "(Leo) Collins went into the mass like a pile driver and through for a touchdown. Hastings kicked goal. Score 10–0."

At the end of the third quarter State had possession on their 48-yard line. They advanced the ball to the Pitt 23-yard line. The Pitt defense stiffened and State tackle "Lamb booted the ball over from placement from the 30-yard line." Score 10 to 3. "Pitt's last score came immediately after. State end "Morris fumbled Pitt's kick-off and (Joe) Matson was the man of the hour, covering on the State 19-yard line, near the side line." The State defense stiffened, "so standing on the 30-yard line, Hastings' 14 carat toe dropkicked another field goal." Pitt beat Penn State two years in a row for the first time.

The Pitt lineup for the game against Penn State was H. Clifford Carlson and Joe Matson (left end), James Jones, Claude E. Thornhill and John Sutherland (left tackle), Chuck Reese and Wayne Smith (left guard). Bob Peck (center), Rendall Soppitt (right guard), Carl Hockensmith (right tackle), James Herron (right end), Guy Williamson (quarterback), Andy Hastings and Jimmy DeHart (left halfback), Whitey Miller, Stevie Dillon and Fred Ward (right halfback), and George Fry, Edward Hanley and Leo Collins(fullback). The game was played in 15-minute quarters.

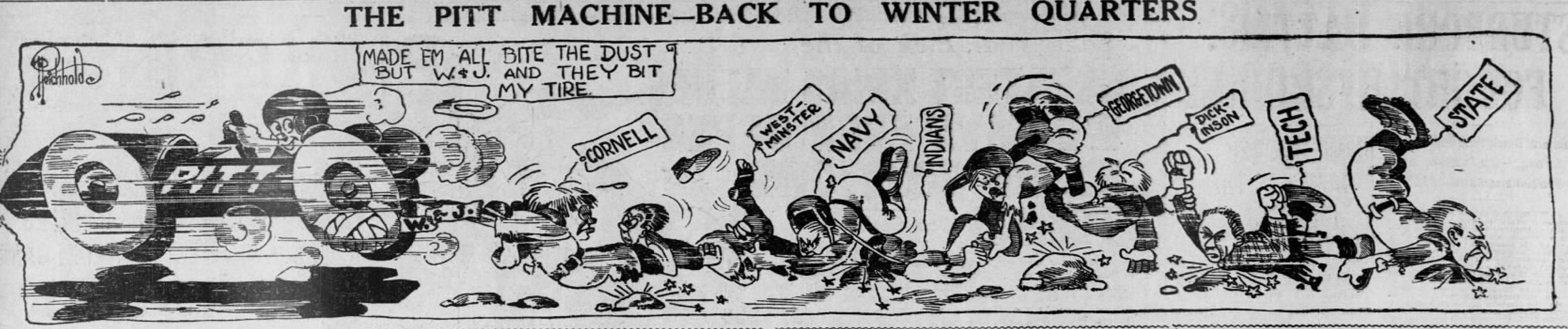

=== Scoring summary ===
1914 Pittsburgh Panthers scoring summary
Player	Touchdowns	Extra points	Field goals	Safety	Points
Leo Collins	2	0	0	0	12
James DeHart	2	0	0	0	12
Guy Williamson	2	1	0	0	13
Philip Dillon	4	0	0	0	24
Robert Peck	2	0	0	0	12
Fred Ward	1	0	0	0	6
Roy “Pete” Heil	2	0	0	0	12
William Miller	3	0	0	0	18
Karl Morrow	1	0	0	0	6
Thomas Healy	1	0	0	0	6
George K. Fry	3	11	0	0	29
Charles "Andy" Hastings	5	12	5	0	57
Totals	28	24	5	0	207

== Postseason ==
The Pitt Weekly wrote a farewell letter to Coach Duff:

"We take this opportunity to thank you for your very efficient work in coaching our football team. The Weekly speaks for the entire student body when it says we are entirely satisfied with the results. To shape an eleven containing so much new material into a team that has made such a showing against our veteran opponents is undoubtedly the work of brains, skill, and untiring devotion. If there be criticism of the things accomplished or the methods utilized, we assure you that it does not come from the students and is not felt by them. We count your two years' work with Pitt successful in every way and it is with sincere regret we learn of your resignation. You have worked hard and faithfully. You have produced a wonderful team. We thank you."

Coach Duff resigned with a record of 14-3-1 (.806 winning pct.).

"Guy "Chalky" Williamson was elected Captain of next year's football team at a meeting of the letter men immediately preceding the dinner on Thanksgiving evening. "Chalky" was elected over Reese on the second ballot by a vote of 15 to 10."

Noted sportswriter Frank G. Menke selected Pitt center Bob Peck to his first team All-American eleven and William "Whitey" Miller to his third team.

On December 4, 1914, by a unanimous vote of the athletic committee, "Glenn Warner was officially chosen to coach the University of Pittsburgh gridders for the next three seasons."
