= Maignelay-Montigny =

- Commune
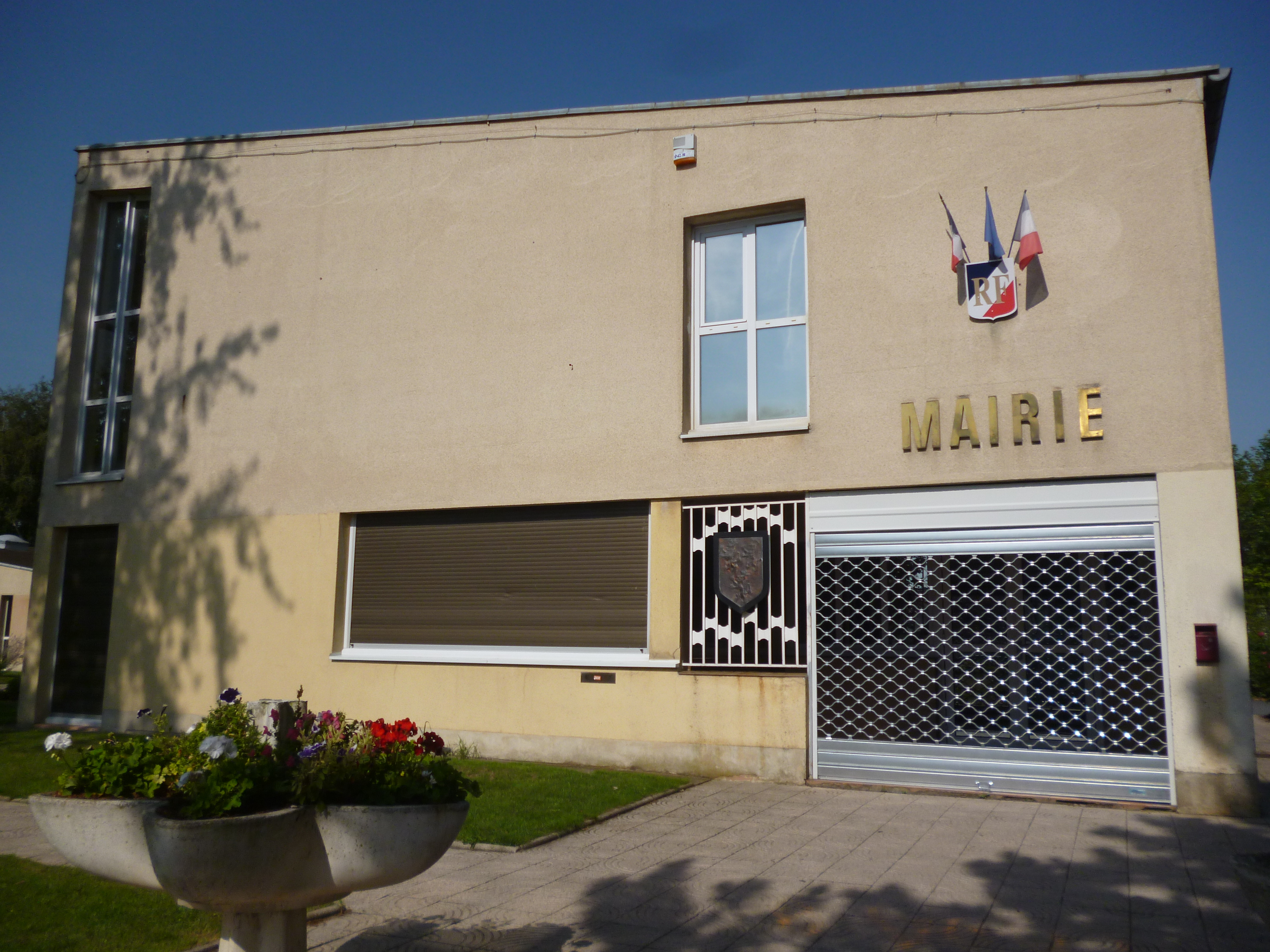
- The town hall in Maignelay-Montigny

- Coat of arms
- Location of Maignelay-Montigny
- Location within France Location within Hauts-de-France
- Coordinates: 49°33′11″N 2°31′16″E
- Country: France
- Region: Hauts-de-France
- Department: Oise
- Arrondissement: Clermont
- Canton: Estrées-Saint-Denis
- Intercommunality: Plateau Picard

Government
  - Mayor (2020–2026): Denis Flour
- Area^{1}: 18.79 km^{2} (7.25 sq mi)
- Highest elevation: 130 m (430 ft)
- Lowest elevation: 84 m (276 ft)
- Population (2023): 2,473
  - Density: 131.6/km^{2} (340.9/sq mi)
- Time zone: UTC+01:00 (CET)
  - Summer (DST): UTC+02:00 (CEST)
- INSEE/Postal code: 60374 /60420
- ^{1} French Land Register data, which excludes lakes, ponds, glaciers > 1 km^{2} (0.386 sq mi or 247 acres) and river estuaries.

Maignelay-Montigny (French pronunciation: [mɛɲlɛ mɔ̃tiɲi]) is a commune in the Oise department in northern France.

== Population ==
Historical population
Year	Pop.	±% p.a.
1968	1,399	—
1975	1,700	+2.82%
1982	2,018	+2.48%
1990	2,273	+1.50%
1999	2,489	+1.01%
2007	2,485	−0.02%
2012	2,704	+1.70%
2017	2,699	−0.04%
2023	2,473	−1.45%
Source: INSEE

== See also ==
- Communes of the Oise department
