= Arthur Bluethenthal =

American football player and coach (1891–1918)

Arthur "Bluey" Bluethenthal
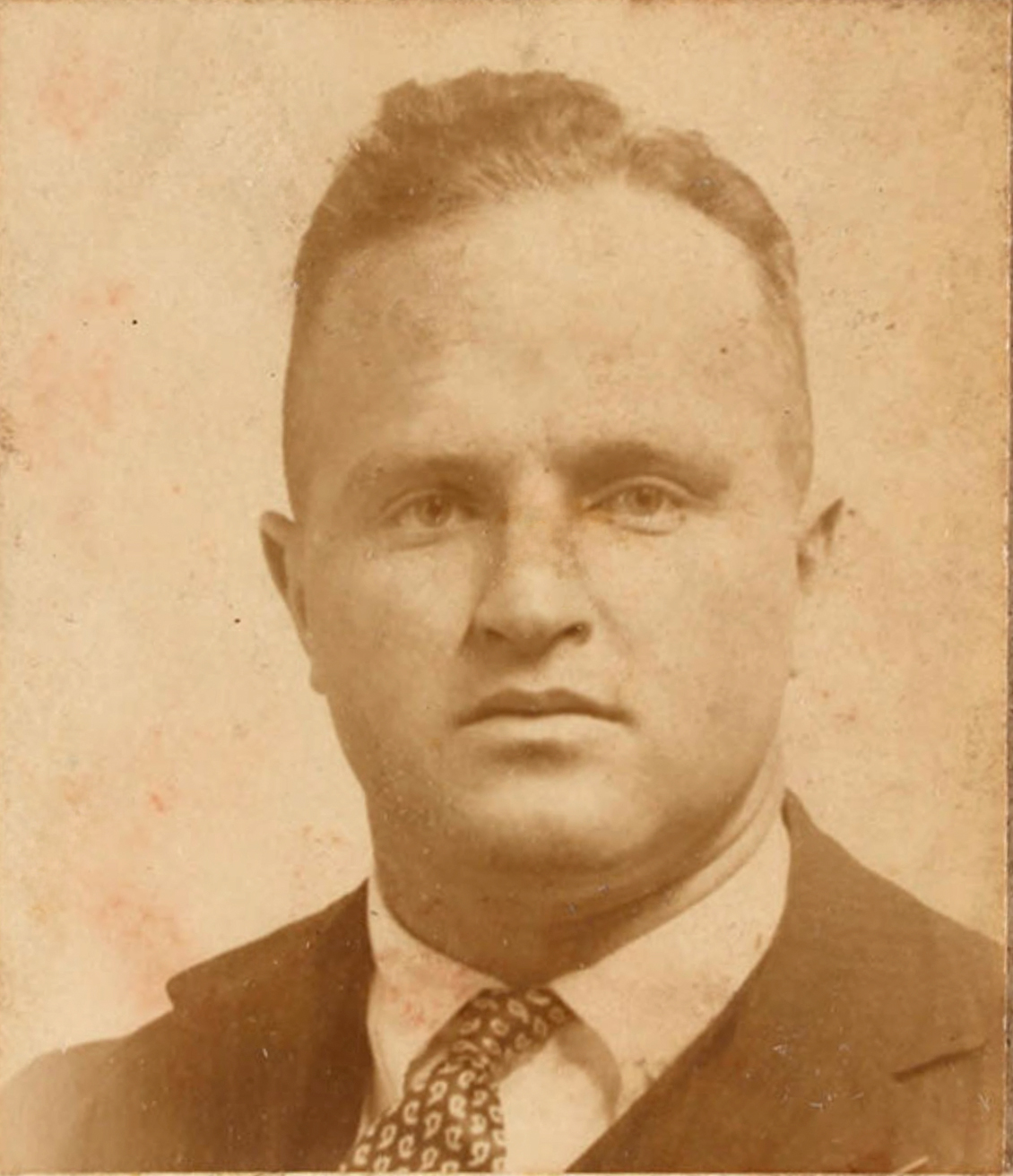
- Born: November 1, 1891; Wilmington, North Carolina, U.S.
- Died: June 5, 1918 (aged 26) near Maignelay, France
- Cause of death: Killed in action
- Resting place: Oakdale Cemetery in Wilmington, NC
- Education: Princeton University
- Occupation: bomber pilot
- Known for: All-American center for Princeton football team; highly decorated fighting for France in World War I
- Height: 5 ft 9 in (1.75 m)
- Awards: 2× All-American (1911, 1912); Croix de Guerre with Star; Croix de Guerre with Palm; Médaille Militaire

Arthur Bluethenthal, nicknamed "Bluey" (November 1, 1891 – June 5, 1918), was an All-American football player for Princeton University, who died in combat fighting for France in World War I.

== Early life ==
The son of Leopold and Johanna Bluethenthal, he attended Phillips Exeter Academy prior to attending Princeton University, from which he graduated in 1913.

== American football career ==
=== Player ===
At Princeton University the 5′-9″, 186-pound Bluethenthal played center from 1910 to 1912. In 1911, he was named first team All-America by a number of newspapers, Walter Camp second team All-America, and first team All-East in a consensus of 28 newspapers. That year, the Tigers were 8–0–2, and yielded only 15 points the entire year. In 1912, Walter Camp selected him as third team All-America. Bluethenthal is a member of the International Jewish Sports Hall of Fame.

=== Coach ===
After he graduated in 1912, Bluethenthal became the line coach for the Princeton Tigers, and then for the University of North Carolina.

== World War I ==
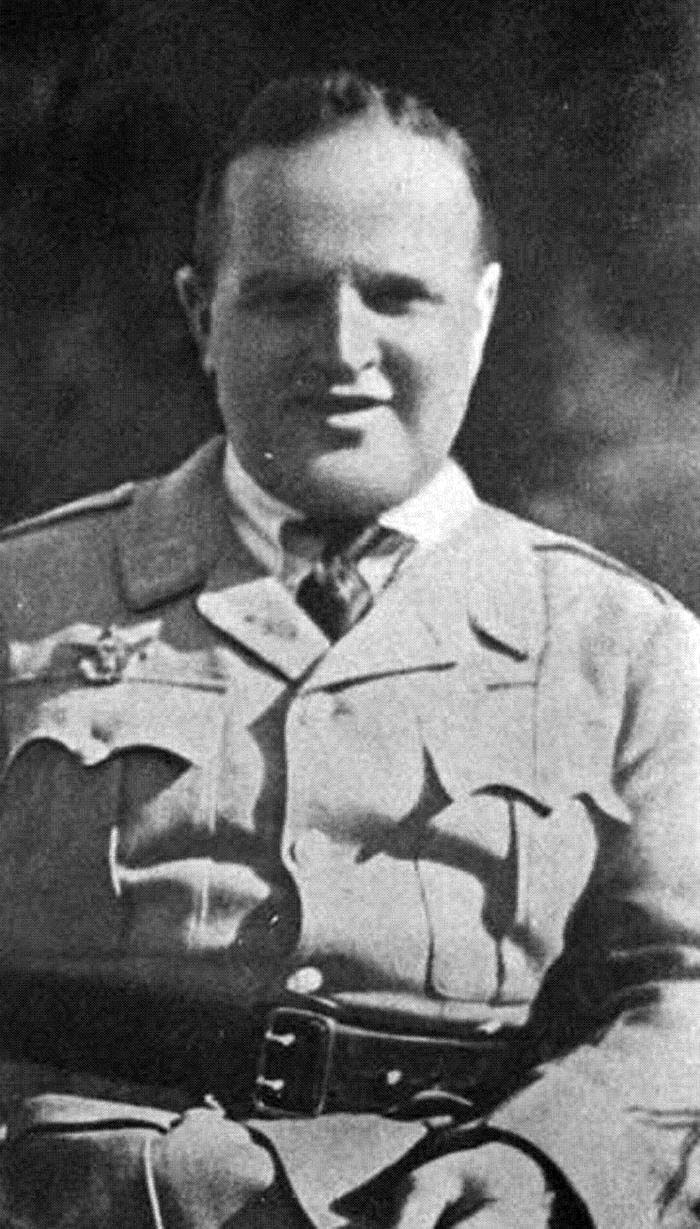
Bluey in uniform

In 1916, a year before the United States entered World War I, he joined the French Foreign Legion and served at the Battle of Verdun with the French 129th Infantry Division. France awarded him the Croix de Guerre with Star for conspicuous bravery.

On June 1, 1917, he joined the French flying corps, flying a single-engine Breguet bomber in the Escadrille Breguet 227 of the Lafayette Flying Corps, as the only American in the squadron. He was killed in battle in aerial combat with four German planes while directing artillery fire on June 5, 1918, near Maignelay, France.

France posthumously awarded him a second Croix de Guerre, with Palm. He also received the Médaille Militaire. In June 1918 Captain Hugh Alwyn Inness-Brown paid tribute to Bluethenthal in the Paris Herald:

In the death of Arthur Bluethenthal, killed in an aerial battle some days ago, France and America lost one of their staunchest patriots. To come to death alone, high in the air, with no friend to tell the story of the struggle and to be buried in a lonely spot near the front, unofficially, with little publicity, would have been the fate that Bluethenthal would have desired, could he have chosen. At all times, he shunned being considered a hero, and when a friend said to him jokingly that his fear of publicity amounted to conceit, he replied, 'Conceit it may be, but I've always taken serving France so seriously that I hardly ever want to talk about it.'

Bluethenthal's remains were repatriated to the United States in 1921. He was buried in Oakdale Cemetery in Wilmington. His grave marker includes the squadron insignia of the Lafayette Escadrille which—unusual for a Jewish cemetery—bears a swastika on the headband.

== Personal ==
The airport in Wilmington, North Carolina, was named Bluethenthal Field on Memorial Day, May 30, 1928, in his honor.

Bluethenthal was Jewish, and was a member of Wilmington's Temple of Israel, the first synagogue in North Carolina.

== See also ==
- List of select Jewish football players
