= John Dalton (American football) =

American football player (1889–1919)

- Dalton, circa 1910

Profile
- Position: Halfback

Personal information
- Born: April 1, 1889; Plattsmouth, Nebraska, U.S.
- Died: March 10, 1919 (aged 29); Brooklyn, New York, U.S.

Career information
- College: Navy (1908–1911)

Awards and highlights
- Consensus All-American (1911)

John Patrick Dalton (April 1, 1889 – March 10, 1919) was an American college football player and captain for the Navy Midshipmen football team of the United States Naval Academy. He was recognized as a consensus first-team All-American in 1911, and elected to the College Football Hall of Fame in 1970. In 1919, he died due to a "bronchial ailment".
