= Joseph Duff =

American football player and coach, United States Army officer

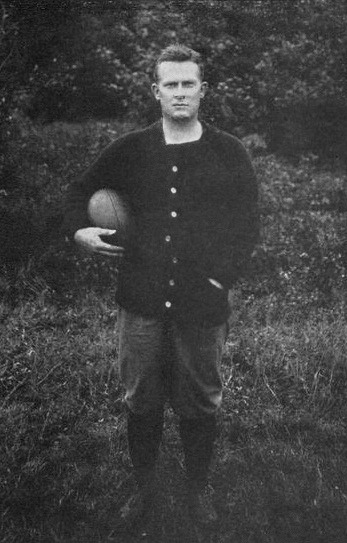
- Duff from The Owl, 1914

Biographical details
- Born: January 28, 1889; Carnegie, Pennsylvania, U.S.
- Died: October 10, 1918 (aged 29); Romagne-sous-Montfaucon, France
- Education: Princeton University

Playing career
- 1911: Princeton
- Position: Guard

Coaching career (HC unless noted)
- 1912: Princeton (assistant)
- 1913–1914: Pittsburgh

Head coaching record
- Overall: 14–3–1

Accomplishments and honors

Championships
- National (1911)

Awards
- Consensus All-American (1911)

Joseph M. Duff Jr. (January 28, 1889 – October 10, 1918) was an All-American football player and coach who was killed in action during World War I. Duff graduated from Shady Side Academy in Pittsburgh, Pennsylvania before enrolling at Princeton University. He played guard for Princeton and was selected for Walter Camp's All-American eleven in 1911. After graduating from Princeton, Duff became an assistant football coach at the school for the 1912 football season, assisting head coach Logan Cunningham. He served as the football coach at the University of Pittsburgh in 1913 and 1914 and graduated from the School of Law in 1915. He became a member of the Allegheny County Bar and went to work in the law firm of his brother James H. Duff.

In June 1917, he was in the Reserve Officers Training Camp in Fort Niagara, but was not given his commission due to a vision problem. Undeterred, he enlisted in the U.S. military in World War I and went to France as a private in the 313th Machine Gun Battalion, 80th Division. He was promoted to the rank of a lieutenant on September 30, 1918 and transferred to the 32nd Division to lead a machine gun company for the 125th Infantry. He was killed in action on Côte Dame Marie in Romagne-sous-Montfaucon, France on October 10, 1918.

== Head coaching record ==
Year	Team	Overall	Conference	Standing	Bowl/playoffs
Pittsburgh Panthers (Independent) (1913–1914)
1913	Pittsburgh	6–2–1			
1914	Pittsburgh	8–1			
Pittsburgh:		14–3–1			
Total:		14–3–1			
