= Ed Hart =

American football player (1887–1956)

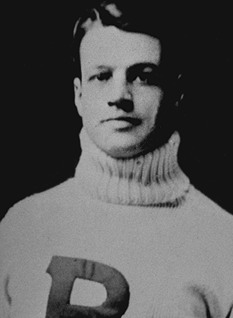

Profile
- Position: Tackle

Personal information
- Born: May 26, 1887; Exeter, New Hampshire, U.S.
- Died: November 28, 1956 (aged 69); Toronto, Ontario, Canada
- Listed height: 5 ft 11 in (1.80 m)
- Listed weight: 208 lb (94 kg)

Career information
- High school: Exeter (NH) Phillips Exeter
- College: Princeton (1908–1911)

Awards and highlights
- National champion (1911); Consensus All-American (1911)
- College Football Hall of Fame (Class of 1954)

Edward J. Hart (May 26, 1887 — November 28, 1956) was an American football tackle. He was a consensus All-American in 1911. Hart played high school football at Phillips Exeter Academy. In his last game at Phillips Exeter he suffered a dislocation in his neck when he ran into a goalpost. This resulted in Hart having to wear a neckbrace for his first three years of college football at Princeton University. He removed the brace in 1911. He was the captain of the Princeton Tigers football team in 1910 and 1911. Hart was a captain in the United States Army in World War I and major in the United States Marines in World War II. He was elected to the College Football Hall of Fame in 1954.

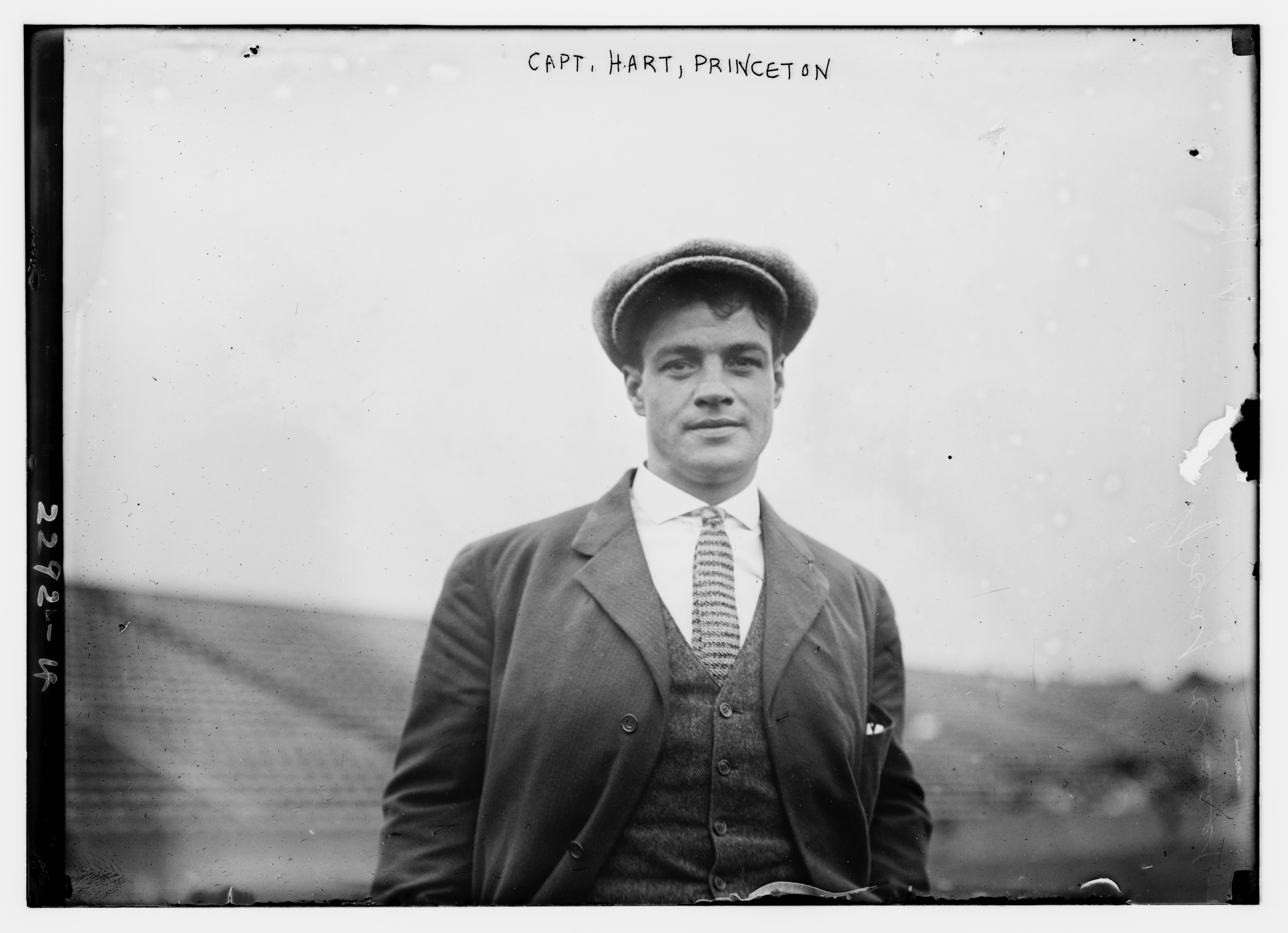
