= 1911 All-America college football team =

Official list of the best college football players of 1911

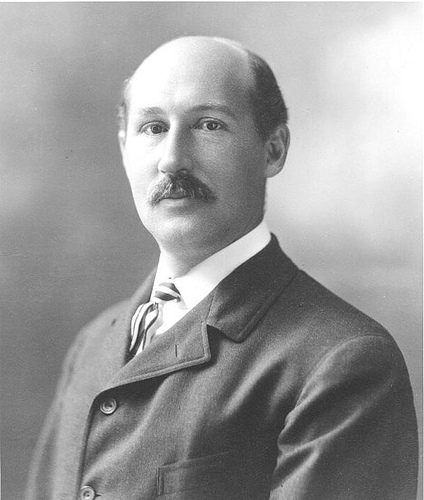
Walter Camp, the only "official" All-America selector in 1911

The 1911 All-America college football team is composed of college football players who were selected as All-Americans for the 1911 college football season. The only selector for the 1911 season who has been recognized as "official" by the National Collegiate Athletic Association (NCAA) is Walter Camp. Many other sports writers, newspapers, coaches and others also selected All-America teams in 1911. Others who selected All-Americans in 1911 include New York sports writer Wilton S. Farnsworth, The New York Globe, Minnesota coach Henry L. Williams, The Christian Science Monitor, former Yale stars Ted Coy and Charles Chadwick, and Baseball Magazine.

== Walter Camp's "official" selections ==
The only individual who has been recognized as an "official" selector by the National Collegiate Athletic Association (NCAA) for the 1911 season is Walter Camp. Accordingly, the NCAA's official listing of "Consensus All-America Selections" mirrors Camp's first-team picks. Nine of Camp's first-team All-Americans in 1911 played on teams from the Ivy League. The only players recognized by Camp from outside the Ivy League were Jim Thorpe from the Carlisle School, Leland Devore of Army and Jack Dalton of Navy.

The dominance of Ivy League players on Camp's All-America teams led to criticism over the years that his selections were biased against players from the leading Western universities, including Chicago, Michigan, Minnesota, Wisconsin, and Notre Dame.

== All-Americans of 1911 ==
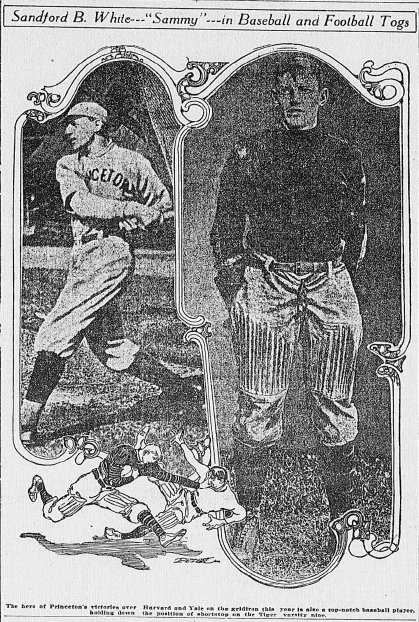
Sanford White of Princeton in both baseball and football uniforms.

=== Ends ===
- **Sanford White**, Princeton (WC-1; NYG-1; TC-1; WSF-1; HW-1; CC-1; HL; BM; CSM; SPS; COY)
- **Douglas Bomeisler**, Yale (College Football Hall of Fame) (WC-1; WSF-2; CC-1; HL; COY)
- Stanfield Wells, Michigan (WC-3 [hb]; NYG-1; HW-1; HL)
- Lawrence Dunlap "Bud" Smith, Harvard (WC-2; TC-1; WSF-1; HL; BM; CSM)
- Dexter Very, Penn. State (College Football Hall of Fame) (WC-2; WSF-3; HL)
- Edward J. Daly, Dartmouth (WSF-2; HL)
- A. Harry Kallett, Syracuse (WC-3; SPS)
- Busty Ashbaugh, Brown (WC-3; WSF-3)
- Frederick L. Conklin, Michigan (HL)
- Chauncey Oliver, Illinois (HL)
- Sampson Burd, Carlisle (HL)

=== Tackles ===
- **Ed Hart**, Princeton (WC-1; NYG-1; TC-1; WSF-1; HW-1; CC-1; HL; BM; CSM; SPS; COY)
- **Leland Devore**, Army (WC-1; NYG-1)
- Jim Scully, Yale (WC-2; WSF-2; CC-1; BM; SPS)
- Jogger Elcock, Dartmouth (WSF-1)
- Leonard Frank, Minnesota (TC-1; HW-1)
- Robert McGowan Littlejohn, Army (WSF-2)
- John Brown, Navy (College Football Hall of Fame), Navy (WC-3; COY)
- William Edward Munk, Cornell (WC-2; WSF-3; BM [fb])
- Sylvester V. Shonka, Nebraska (HL)
- Charles M. Rademacher, Chicago (HL; CSM)
- Greig, Swarthmore (HL)
- Rudy Probst, Syracuse (HL)
- Oliver M. Kratz, Brown (WSF-3)

=== Guards ===
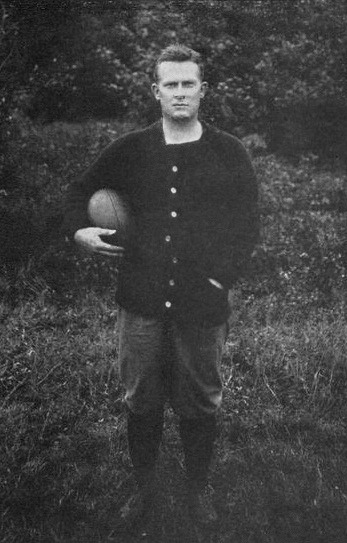
Joseph Duff of Princeton.

- **Bob Fisher**, Harvard (College Football Hall of Fame) (WC-1; TC-1; WSF-1; CC-1; BM; CSM; SPS; COY)
- **Joseph Duff**, Princeton (WC-1; TC-1; WSF-1; CC-1; HL; CSM; COY)
- Alfred L. Buser, Wisconsin (WC-3 [t]; NYG-1; HL [t])
- Charles J. Robinson, Minnesota (HW-1)
- Ray Wakeman, Navy (HW-1)
- George Howe, Navy (NYG-1)
- Horace Scruby, Chicago (WC-2; HL)
- Elmer McDevitt, Yale (WC-2; WSF-2)
- James "Red" Bebout, Penn State (WSF-2)
- Pomeroy T. Francis, Yale (WC-3; BM)
- Archibald Vincent Arnold, Army (WC-3; WSF-3; HL; CSM; SPS)
- Paul Belting, Illinois (HL)
- Ray L. Bennett, Dartmouth (WSF-3)

=== Centers ===
- **Hank Ketcham**, Yale (College Football Hall of Fame) (WC-1; NYG-1; WSF-2; CC-1; HL; SPS; COY)
- Arthur Bluethenthal, Princeton (WC-2; TC-1; WSF-1; HL; BM)
- Franklin C. Sibert, Army (HW-1)
- P. V. H. Weems, Navy (WC-3)
- Willis "Fat" O'Brien, Iowa (HL)
- James A. Ayling, Syracuse (WSF-3)

=== Quarterbacks ===
Art Howe of Yale.

- **Art Howe**, Yale (College Football Hall of Fame) (WC-1; NYG-1; WSF-1; HW-1; CC-1; HL; COY)
- **Earl Sprackling**, Brown (College Football Hall of Fame) (WC-2; WSF-2; HL; BM)
- John "Keckie" Moll, Wisconsin (HL; CSM; SPS)
- Ralph Capron, Minnesota (WC-3; TC-1; HL)
- Thomas Andrew Gill, Indiana (HL)
- Ray Morrison, Vanderbilt (College Football Hall of Fame) (HL; COY [hb])
- Preston Doane Fogg, Syracuse (HL)
- Shorty Miller, Penn State (College Football Hall of Fame) (WSF-3)

=== Halfbacks ===
- **Percy Wendell**, Harvard (College Football Hall of Fame) (WC-1; NYG-1 [fb]; TC-1; WSF-1; HW-1; CC-1; HL; BM; CSM; SPS [fb]; COY [fb])
- **Jim Thorpe**, Carlisle (College Football Hall of Fame) (WC-1; WSF-2; CC-1; HL; BM; CSM; SPS)
- Reuben Martin Rosenwald, Minnesota (WC-2; NYG-1; HW-1; HL)
- Walter C. Camp, Jr., Yale (WC-2; WSF-2; HL)
- Dave Morey, Dartmouth (WC-2)
- Talbot Pendleton, Princeton (WSF-3)
- Robert Hogsett, Dartmouth (WSF-3)
- James B. Craig, Michigan (HL)
- Clark Sauer, Chicago (HL)
- Elmer Oliphant, Purdue (HL)
- Johnny Spiegel, Lafayette (HL)
- Harry Costello, Georgetown (HL)

=== Fullbacks ===
- **Jack Dalton**, Navy (College Football Hall of Fame) (WC-1; NYG-1 [hb]; TC-1 [hb]; WSF-1 [hb]; CC-1; HL; SPS [hb]; COY [hb])
- F. LeRoy Mercer, Penn (College Football Hall of Fame) (WC-3 [hb]; TC-1; WSF-1; HL; CSM)
- Jesse Philbin, Yale (WSF-1)
- Winthrop J. Snow, Dartmouth (WSF-2)
- Ted Hudson, Trinity (WC-3, WSF-3)
- Stancil "Possum" Powell, Carlisle (HL)
- Wallace De Witt, Princeton (HL)

=== Key ===
NCAA recognized selectors for 1911

- WC = Collier's Weekly as selected by Walter Camp

Other selectors

- NYG = The New York Globe
- HL = Outing magazine published a "Football Honor List for 1911" selected by coaches from the East and West.
- TC = Tommy Clark
- WSF = W.S. Farnsworth
- HW = Dr. Henry L. Williams, longtime coach at the University of Minnesota
- CC = Charles Chadwick, "former famous Yale guard"
- BM = Baseball Magazine
- CSM = The Christian Science Monitor
- SPS = Syracuse Post-Standard
- COY = Former Yale star Ted Coy

Bold = Consensus All-American

- 1 – First-team selection
- 2 – Second-team selection
- 3 – Third-team selection

== See also ==
- 1911 All-Southern college football team
- 1911 All-Western college football team
