= Baseball Magazine =

American magazine (1908–1957)

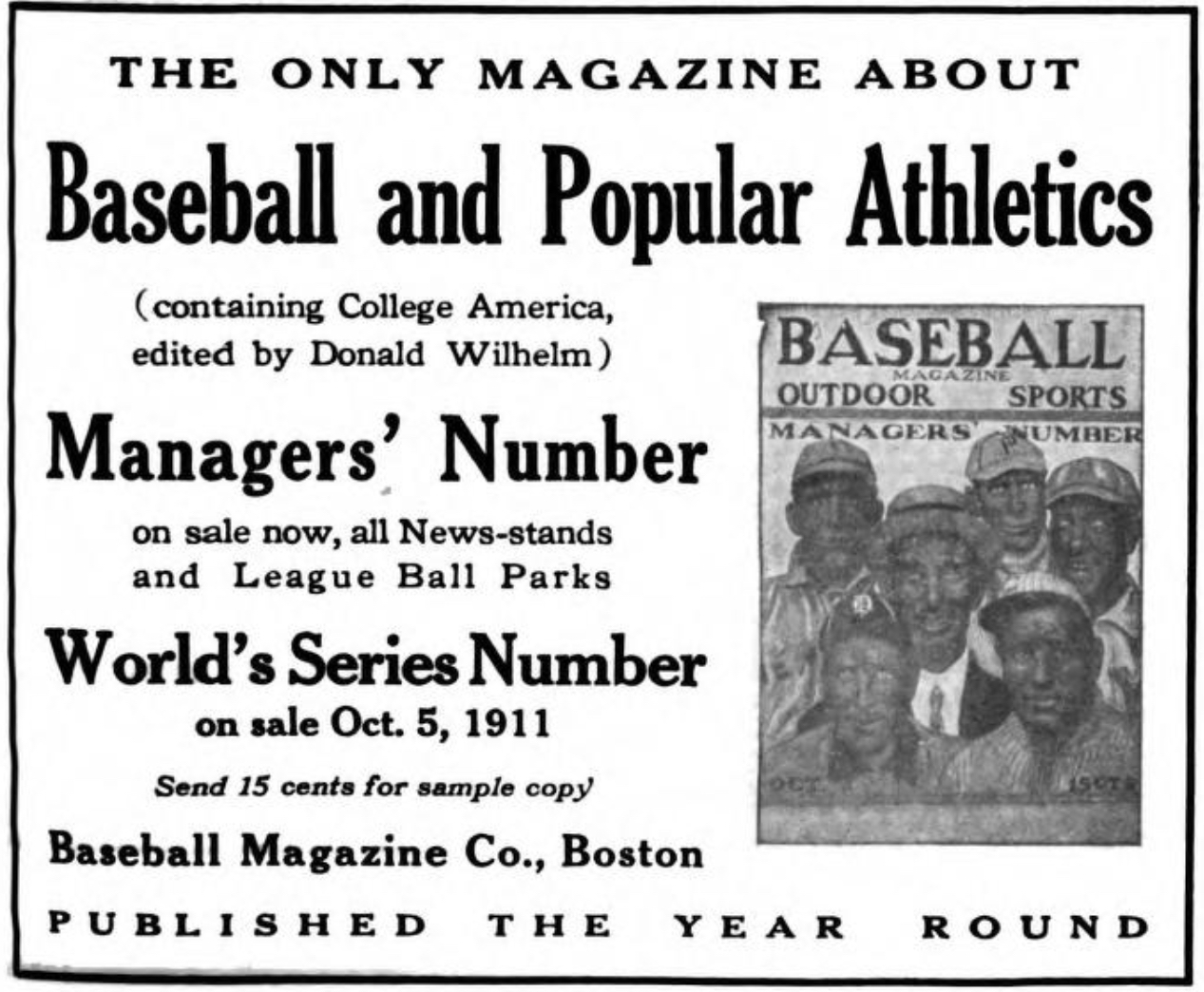
October 1911 Baseball magazine ad in The Black Cat magazine

Baseball Magazine was a baseball magazine, the first monthly baseball magazine published in the United States. The magazine was founded by Boston sportswriter Jake Morse prior to the 1908 season. It continued publishing until September 1957. The magazine was resurrected for a short reprieve from November 1964 through April 1965, before folding again. The magazine was based in Boston.

Morse stated that his mission in starting Baseball Magazine was to "fill the need of a monthly organ filled with the highest thought surrounding the game, well edited, well printed, and filled with first class illustrations." The magazine also strove to provide human interest stories about baseball stars, such as Ty Cobb and Christy Mathewson. F.C. Lane became the magazine's editor in 1911 and remained in that post until 1937. One of Lane's first issues was devoted to Cobb, including stories about him and a Q&A session with him. Morse had previously devoted issues to Cy Young in 1908, shortly after baseball commemorated Cy Young Day, and to Addie Joss in 1911, shortly after Joss' death. Despite the magazine's reverence for Young and Mathewson, in 1909 Morse wrote an article in Baseball Magazine proclaiming former Providence Grays pitcher Charles Radbourn to be "the greatest pitcher who ever lived." Another famous article from the magazine's early days described how difficult it was to be a catcher in baseball's early days.

During the 1920s the magazine complained about players being paid to act as baseball writers.
