= List of Temple Owls football seasons =

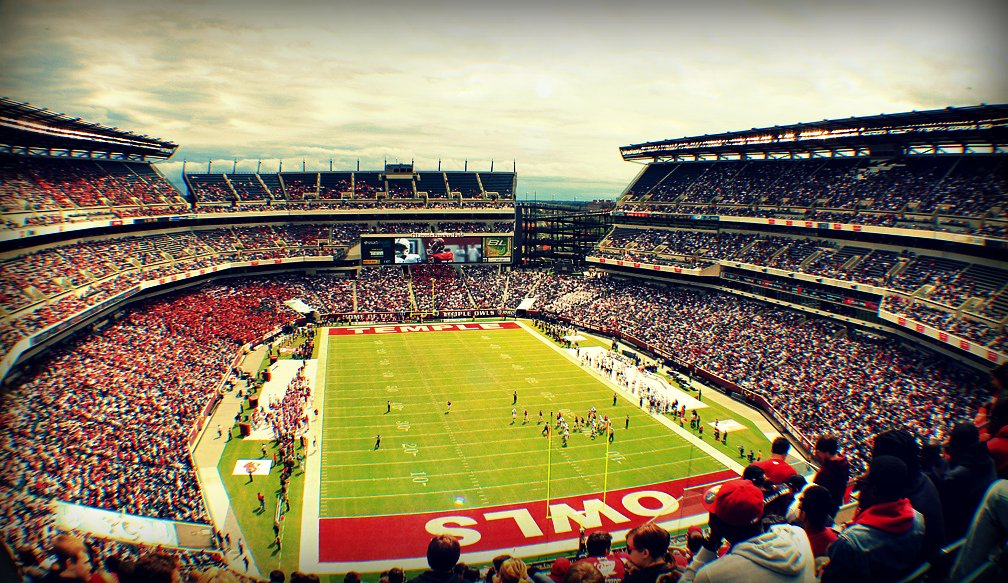
Lincoln Financial Field in South Philadelphia, the home field of Temple Owls football since 2003

This is a list of seasons completed by the Temple Owls football team of the National Collegiate Athletic Association (NCAA) Division I Football Bowl Subdivision (FBS).

== Seasons ==
| Year | Coach | Overall | Conference | Standing | Bowl/playoffs | Coaches^{#} | AP^{°} |
|---|---|---|---|---|---|---|---|
Charles M. Williams (Independent) (1894–1898)
| 1894 | Charles M. Williams | 4–1 | | | | | |
| 1895 | Charles M. Williams | 1–4–1 | | | | | |
| 1896 | Charles M. Williams | 3–2 | | | | | |
| 1897 | Charles M. Williams | 3–3 | | | | | |
| 1898 | Charles M. Williams | 2–5 | | | | | |
John Rogers (Independent) (1899–1900)
| 1899 | John Rogers | 1–4–1 | | | | | |
| 1900 | John Rogers | 3–4–1 | | | | | |
Harry Shindle Wingert (Independent) (1901–1905)
| 1901 | Harry Shindle Wingert | 3–2 | | | | | |
| 1902 | Harry Shindle Wingert | 1–4–1 | | | | | |
| 1903 | Harry Shindle Wingert | 4–1 | | | | | |
| 1904 | Harry Shindle Wingert | 2–2 | | | | | |
| 1905 | Harry Shindle Wingert | 2–1 | | | | | |
| 1906 | No team | | | | | | |
Horace Butterworth (Independent) (1907)
| 1907 | Horace Butterworth | 4–0–2 | | | | | |
Frank W. White (Independent) (1908)
| 1908 | Frank W. White | 3–2–1 | | | | | |
William J. Schatz (Independent) (1909–1913)
| 1909 | William J. Schatz | 0–4–1 | | | | | |
| 1910 | William J. Schatz | 3–3 | | | | | |
| 1911 | William J. Schatz | 6–1 | | | | | |
| 1912 | William J. Schatz | 3–2 | | | | | |
| 1913 | William J. Schatz | 1–3–2 | | | | | |
William Nicolai (Independent) (1914–1916)
| 1914 | William Nicolai | 3–3 | | | | | |
| 1915 | William Nicolai | 3–1–1 | | | | | |
| 1916 | William Nicolai | 3–1–2 | | | | | |
Elwood Geiges (Independent) (1917)
| 1917 | Elwood Geiges | 0–6–1 | | | | | |
| 1918 | No team | | | | | | |
| 1919 | No team | | | | | | |
| 1920 | No team | | | | | | |
| 1921 | No team | | | | | | |
M. Francois D'Eliscu (Independent) (1922–1923)
| 1922 | M. Francois D'Eliscu | 1-4-1 | | | | | |
| 1923 | M. Francois D'Eliscu | 0-5 | | | | | |
Albert Barron (Independent) (1924)
| 1924 | Albert Barron | 1-4 | | | | | |
Heinie Miller (Independent) (1925–1932)
| 1925 | Heinie Miller | 5-2-2 | | | | | |
| 1926 | Heinie Miller | 5-3 | | | | | |
| 1927 | Heinie Miller | 7-1 | | | | | |
| 1928 | Heinie Miller | 7-1-2 | | | | | |
| 1929 | Heinie Miller | 6-3-1 | | | | | |
| 1930 | Heinie Miller | 7-3 | | | | | |
| 1931 | Heinie Miller | 8-1-1 | | | | | |
| 1932 | Heinie Miller | 5-1-2 | | | | | |
Pop Warner (Independent) (1933–1938)
| 1933 | Pop Warner | 5-3 | | | | | |
| 1934 | Pop Warner | 7-1-2 | | | L Sugar | | |
| 1935 | Pop Warner | 7-3 | | | | | |
| 1936 | Pop Warner | 6-3-2 | | | | | |
| 1937 | Pop Warner | 3-2-4 | | | | | |
| 1938 | Pop Warner | 3-6-1 | | | | | |
Fred H. Swan (Independent) (1939)
| 1939 | Fred H. Swan | 2-7 | | | | | |
Ray Morrison (Independent) (1940–1948)
| 1940 | Ray Morrison | 4-4-1 | | | | | |
| 1941 | Ray Morrison | 7-2 | | | | | |
| 1942 | Ray Morrison | 2-5-3 | | | | | |
| 1943 | Ray Morrison | 2-6 | | | | | |
| 1944 | Ray Morrison | 2-4-2 | | | | | |
| 1945 | Ray Morrison | 7-1 | | | | | |
| 1946 | Ray Morrison | 2-4-2 | | | | | |
| 1947 | Ray Morrison | 3-6 | | | | | |
| 1948 | Ray Morrison | 2-6-1 | | | | | |
Albert Kawal (Independent) (1949–1954)
| 1949 | Albert Kawal | 5-4 | | | | | |
| 1950 | Albert Kawal | 4-4-1 | | | | | |
| 1951 | Albert Kawal | 6-4 | | | | | |
| 1952 | Albert Kawal | 2-7-1 | | | | | |
| 1953 | Albert Kawal | 4-1-4 | | | | | |
| 1954 | Albert Kawal | 3-5 | | | | | |
Josh Cody (Independent) (1955)
| 1955 | Josh Cody | 0-8 | | | | | |
Peter P. Stevens (Independent) (1956–1957)
| 1956 | Peter P. Stevens | 3-5 | | | | | |
| 1957 | Peter P. Stevens | 1-6 | | | | | |
Peter P. Stevens (Middle Atlantic Conference) (1958–1959)
| 1958 | Peter P. Stevens | 0-8 | 0–5 | 7th | | | |
| 1959 | Peter P. Stevens | 0-9 | 0–5 | 7th | | | |
George Makris (Middle Atlantic Conference) (1960–1969)
| 1960 | George Makris | 2-7 | 0–5 | 7th | | | |
| 1961 | George Makris | 2-5-2 | 1–2–2 | 6th | | | |
| 1962 | George Makris | 3-6 | 2–3 | 4th | | | |
| 1963 | George Makris | 5-3-1 | 1–2 | 4th | | | |
| 1964 | George Makris | 7-2 | 4–1 | T–2nd | | | |
| 1965 | George Makris | 5-5 | 3–2 | 3rd | | | |
| 1966 | George Makris | 6-3 | 2–2 | 3rd | | | |
| 1967 | George Makris | 7-2 | 4–0 | 1st | | | |
| 1968 | George Makris | 4-6 | 2–2 | 5th | | | |
| 1969 | George Makris | 4-5-1 | 1–2–1 | 5th | | | |
Wayne Hardin (Independent) (1970–1982)
| 1970 | Wayne Hardin | 7-3 | | | | | |
| 1971 | Wayne Hardin | 6-2-1 | | | | | |
| 1972 | Wayne Hardin | 5-4 | | | | | |
| 1973 | Wayne Hardin | 9-1 | | | | | |
| 1974 | Wayne Hardin | 8-2 | | | | | |
| 1975 | Wayne Hardin | 6-5 | | | | | |
| 1976 | Wayne Hardin | 4-6 | | | | | |
| 1977 | Wayne Hardin | 5-5-1 | | | | | |
| 1978 | Wayne Hardin | 7-3-1 | | | | | |
| 1979 | Wayne Hardin | 10-2 | | | W Garden State | 17 | 17 |
| 1980 | Wayne Hardin | 4-7 | | | | | |
| 1981 | Wayne Hardin | 5-5 | | | | | |
| 1982 | Wayne Hardin | 4-7 | | | | | |
Bruce Arians (Independent) (1983–1988)
| 1983 | Bruce Arians | 4-7 | | | | | |
| 1984 | Bruce Arians | 6-5 | | | | | |
| 1985 | Bruce Arians | 4-7 | | | | | |
| 1986 | Bruce Arians | 6-5 | | | | | |
| 1987 | Bruce Arians | 3-8 | | | | | |
| 1988 | Bruce Arians | 4-7 | | | | | |
Jerry Berndt (Independent) (1989–1990)
| 1989 | Jerry Berndt | 1-10 | | | | | |
| 1990 | Jerry Berndt | 7-4 | | | | | |
Jerry Berndt (Big East Conference) (1991–1992)
| 1991 | Jerry Berndt | 2-9 | 0–5 | (Note: The Big East did not crown an official champion until 1993 when full league play began.) | | | |
| 1992 | Jerry Berndt | 1-10 | 0–6 | | | | |
Ron Dickerson (Big East Conference) (1993–1997)
| 1993 | Ron Dickerson | 1-10 | 0–7 | 8th | | | |
| 1994 | Ron Dickerson | 2-9 | 0–7 | 8th | | | |
| 1995 | Ron Dickerson | 1-10 | 1–6 | 7th | | | |
| 1996 | Ron Dickerson | 1-10 | 0–7 | 8th | | | |
| 1997 | Ron Dickerson | 3-8 | 3–4 | T–5th | | | |
Bobby Wallace (Big East Conference) (1998–2004)
| 1998 | Bobby Wallace | 2-9 | 2–5 | T–6th | | | |
| 1999 | Bobby Wallace | 2–9 | 2–5 | T–5th | | | |
| 2000 | Bobby Wallace | 4–7 | 1–6 | 7th | | | |
| 2001 | Bobby Wallace | 4–7 | 2–5 | 6th | | | |
| 2002 | Bobby Wallace | 4–8 | 2–5 | T–6th | | | |
| 2003 | Bobby Wallace | 1–11 | 0–7 | 7th | | | |
| 2004 | Bobby Wallace | 2–9 | 1–5 | T–6th | | | |
Bobby Wallace (Independent) (2005)
| 2005 | Bobby Wallace | 0–11 | | | | | |
Al Golden (Independent) (2006)
| 2006 | Al Golden | 1–11 | | | | | |
Al Golden (Mid-American Conference) (2007–2010)
| 2007 | Al Golden | 4–8 | 3–3 | T–4th (East) | | | |
| 2008 | Al Golden | 5–7 | 4–4 | T–2nd (East) | | | |
| 2009 | Al Golden | 9–4 | 7–1 | T–1st (East) | L EagleBank | | |
| 2010 | Al Golden | 8–4 | 5–3 | 3rd (East) | | | |
Steve Addazio (Mid-American Conference) (2011)
| 2011 | Steve Addazio | 9–4 | 7–1 | 2nd (East) | W New Mexico | | |
Steve Addazio (Big East Conference) (2012)
| 2012 | Steve Addazio | 4–7 | 2–5 | 7th | | | |
Matt Rhule (American Athletic Conference) (2013–2016)
| 2013 | Matt Rhule | 2–10 | 1–7 | T–9th | | | |
| 2014 | Matt Rhule | 6–6 | 4–4 | 6th | | | |
| 2015 | Matt Rhule | 10–4 | 7–1 | 1st (East) | L Boca Raton | | |
| 2016 | Matt Rhule (Note: Ed Foley coached the 2016 Military Bowl after head coach Matt Rhule resigned to become the head coach at Baylor.) | 10–4 | 7–1 | T–1st (East) | L Military | | |
Geoff Collins (American Athletic Conference) (2017–2018)
| 2017 | Geoff Collins | 7–6 | 4–4 | 3rd (East) | W Gasparilla | | |
| 2018 | Geoff Collins (Note: Ed Foley coached the 2018 Independence Bowl after head coach Geoff Collins resigned to become the head coach at Georgia Tech.) | 8–5 | 7–1 | 2nd (East) | L Independence | | |
Rod Carey (American Athletic Conference) (2019–2021)
| 2019 | Rod Carey | 8–5 | 5–3 | 3rd (East) | L Military | | |
| 2020 | Rod Carey | 1–6 | 1–6 | 10th | | | |
| 2021 | Rod Carey | 3–9 | 1–7 | 11th | | | |
Stan Drayton (American Athletic Conference) (2022–2024)
| 2022 | Stan Drayton | 3–9 | 1–7 | 10th | | | |
| 2023 | Stan Drayton | 3–9 | 1–7 | 13th | | | |
| 2024 | Stan Drayton (Note: Everett Withers coached the final two games after head coach Stan Drayton was fired.) | 3–9 | 2–6 | T–11th | | | |
K. C. Keeler (American Athletic Conference) (2025–present)
| 2025 | K. C. Keeler | 5–7 | 3–5 | T–9th | | | |
| Total: | | 495–638–52 | | | | | |
National championship Conference title Conference division title or championship game berth
^{†}Indicates Bowl Coalition, Bowl Alliance, BCS, or CFP / New Years' Six bowl.; ^{#}Rankings from final Coaches Poll.

== Coaching history ==
| Coach | Years | Seasons | Record | Pct. | Bowls |
| Charles M. Williams | 1894–1898 | 5 | 13–15–1 | .466 | |
| John Rogers | 1899–1900 | 2 | 4–8–2 | .357 | |
| Harry Shindle Wingert | 1901–1905 | 5 | 12–9–2 | .583 | |
| Horace Butterworth | 1907 | 1 | 4–0–2 | .833 | |
| Frank W. White | 1908 | 1 | 3–2–1 | .583 | |
| William J. Schatz | 1909–1913 | 5 | 13–13–3 | .500 | |
| William Nicolai | 1914–1916 | 3 | 9–5–3 | .618 | |
| Elwood Geiges | 1917 | 1 | 0–6–1 | .071 | |
| Francois M. D'Eliscu | 1922–1923 | 2 | 1–9–1 | .136 | |
| Albert Barron | 1924 | 1 | 1–4–0 | .200 | |
| Henry J. Miller | 1925–1932 | 8 | 50–15–8 | .740 | |
| Pop Warner | 1933–1938 | 6 | 31–18–9 | .612 | 0–1 |
| Fred H. Swan | 1939 | 1 | 2–7–0 | .222 | |
| Ray Morrison | 1940–1948 | 9 | 31–38–9 | .455 | |
| Albert Kawal | 1949–1954 | 6 | 24–28–3 | .464 | |
| Josh Cody | 1955 | 1 | 0–8–0 | .000 | |
| Peter P. Stevens | 1956–1959 | 4 | 4–28–0 | .125 | |
| George Makris | 1960–1969 | 10 | 45–44–4 | .505 | |
| Wayne Hardin | 1970–1982 | 13 | 80–52–3 | .604 | 1–0 |
| Bruce Arians | 1983–1988 | 6 | 21–45 | .318 | |
| Jerry Berndt | 1989–1992 | 4 | 11–33 | .250 | |
| Ron Dickerson | 1993–1997 | 5 | 8–47 | .145 | |
| Bobby Wallace | 1998–2005 | 8 | 19–71 | .211 | |
| Al Golden | 2006–2010 | 5 | 27–34 | .443 | 0–1 |
| Steve Addazio | 2011–2012 | 2 | 13–11 | .542 | 1–0 |
| Matt Rhule | 2013–2016 | 4 | 28–23 | .549 | 0–1 |
| Ed Foley (interim) | 2016 | 1 | 0–1 | .000 | 0–1 |
| Geoff Collins | 2017–2018 | 2 | 15–10 | .583 | 1–0 |
| Ed Foley (interim) | 2018 | 1 | 0-1 | .000 | 0-1 |
| Rod Carey | 2019–2021 | 3 | 12–20 | .375 | 0–1 |
| Stan Drayton | 2022–2024 | 3 | 9–25 | .265 | |
| Everett Withers (interim) | 2024 | 1 | 0–2 | .000 | |
| K. C. Keeler | 2025–present | 1 | 5-7 | .417 | |
| Totals | 1894–present | 127 | 495–639–52 | .439 | 3–6 |
