= List of Temple Owls men's basketball head coaches =

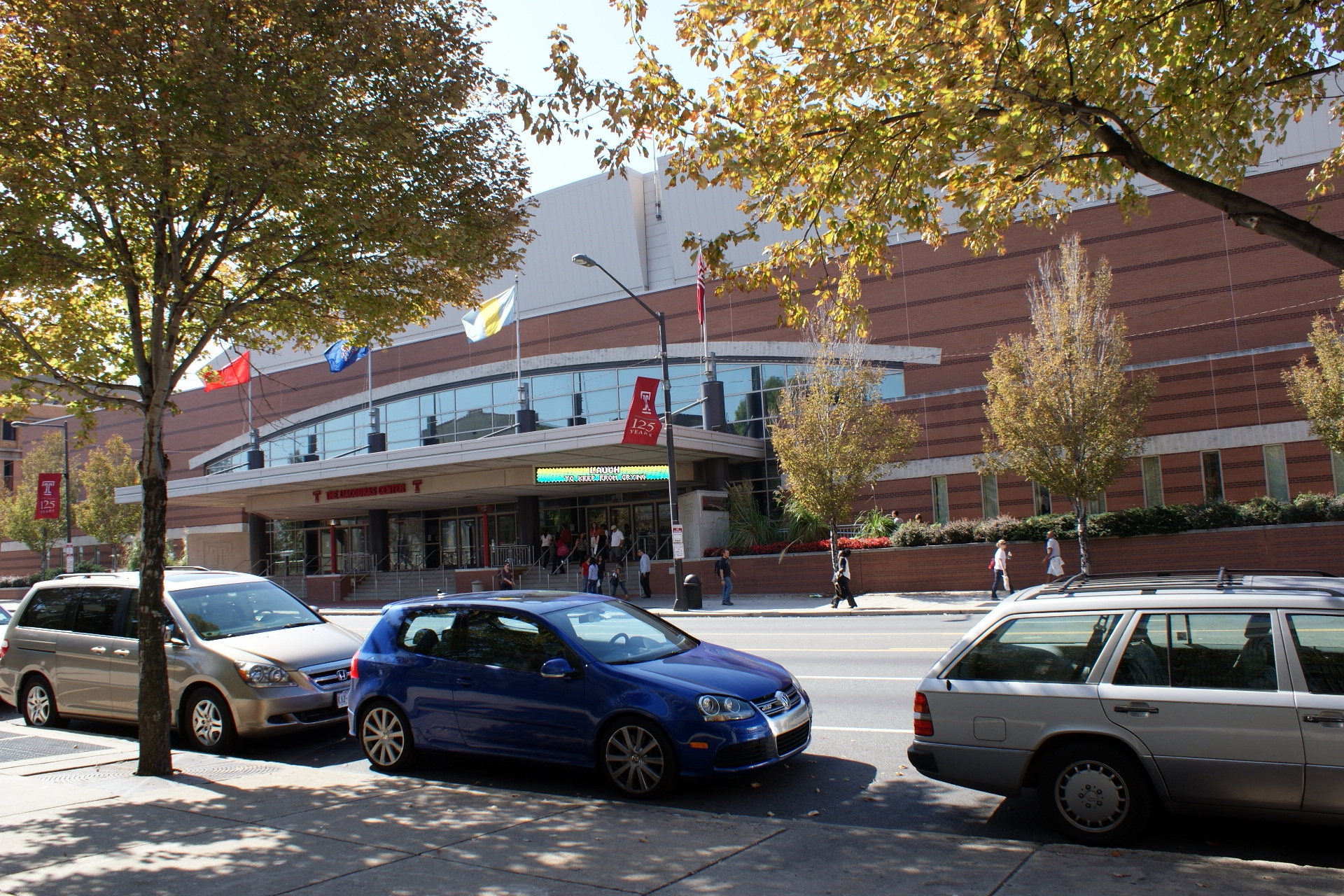
The Temple Owls have played their home games at the Peter J. Liacouras Center (affectionately known as "the Pete") since 1997.

The Temple Owls are an American collegiate basketball team based in Philadelphia representing Temple University. They play in the American Athletic Conference.

There have been 18 head coaches for the Owls, including two Basketball Hall of Fame inductees – Harry Litwack and John Chaney. The Owls play their home games at Liacouras Center in Philadelphia and are one of the original collegiate team members of the Philadelphia Big 5, along with Philadelphia collegiate rivals St. Joseph's, Penn, Villanova and LaSalle.

== Key ==
GC	Games coached
W	Wins
L	Losses
Win%	Winning percentage
#	Number of coaches
†	Elected into the Basketball Hall of Fame as a coach

== Gallery ==
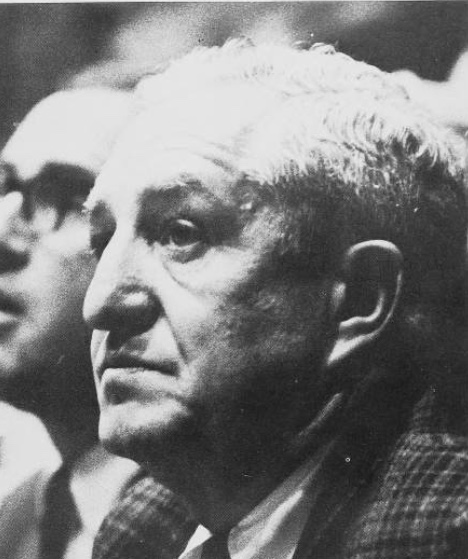
Hall of Fame inductee Harry Litwack coached the Owls for 21 seasons. He is the school's second-winningest coach behind fellow inductee John Chaney.

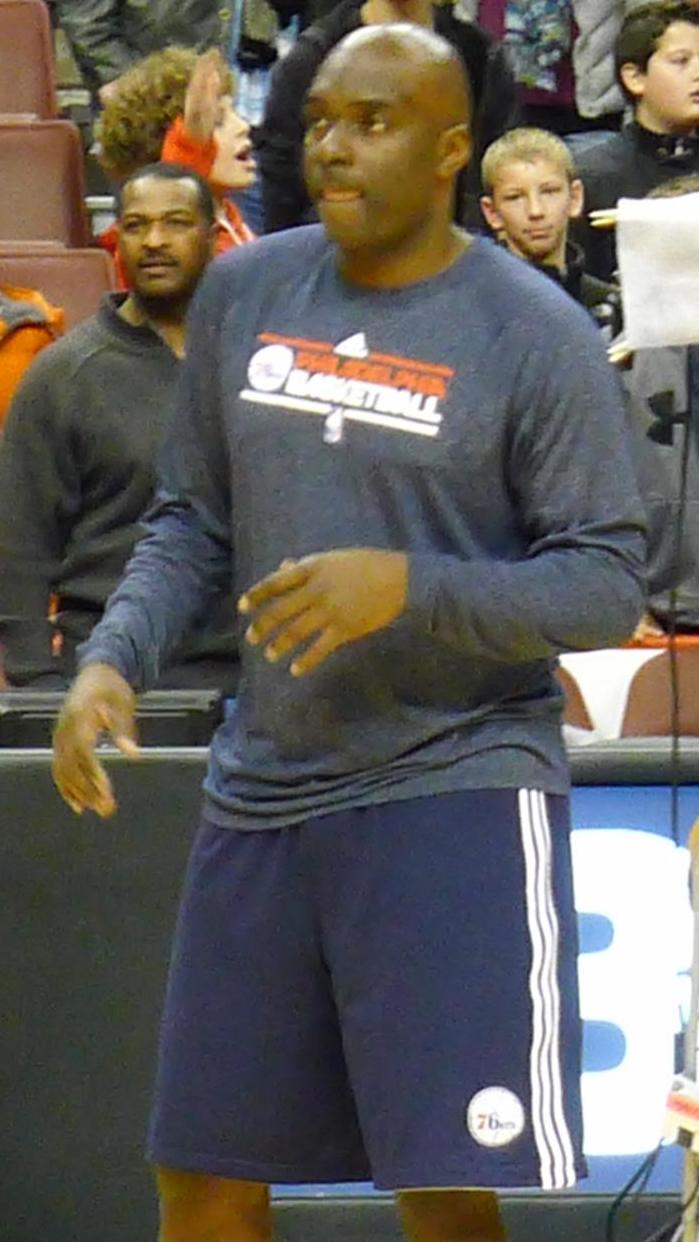
Former NBA guard and Owls player Aaron McKie was the men's head basketball coach from 2019 to 2023.

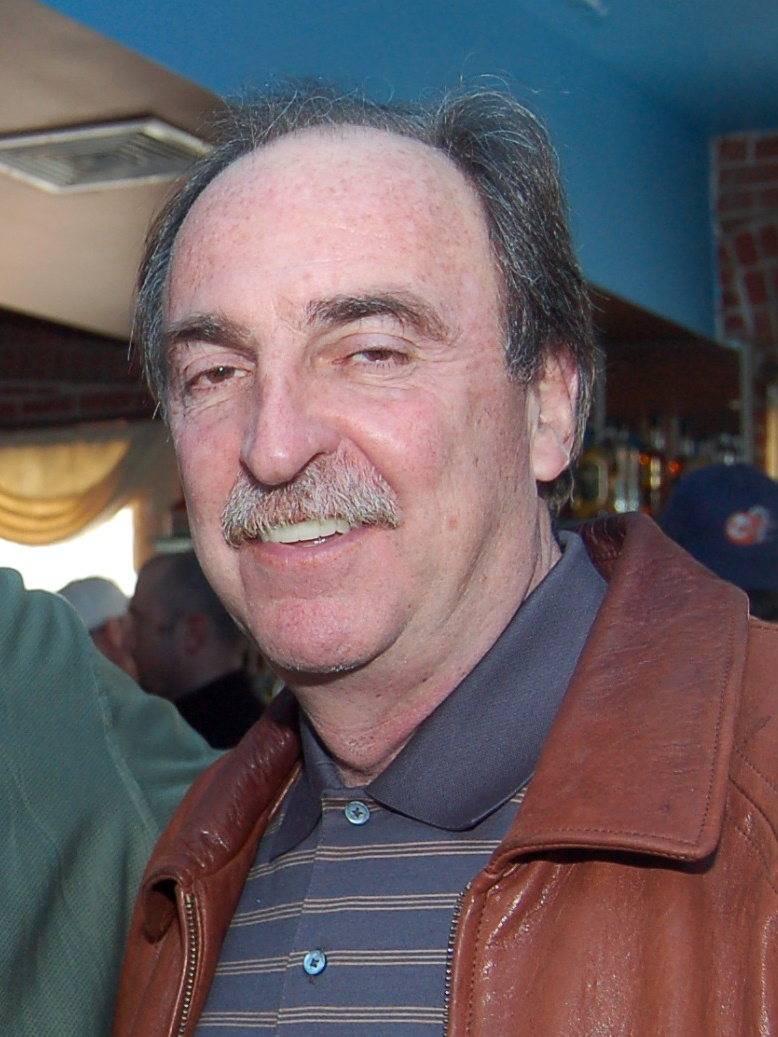
Fran Dunphy was the Temple Owls head coach from 2006 to 2019, leading the Owls to eight NCAA tournament appearances.

== Coaches ==
Note: Statistics are correct through the end of the 2022–23 NCAA basketball season.

#	Name	Term	GC	W	L	Win%	GC	W	L	Win%	Achievements	Reference
#	Name	Term	Overall record				Conference record				Achievements	Reference
Temple Owls
1	Charles Williams	1894–1899	105	73	32	.695	—	—	—	—		
2	John Rogers	1899–1900	22	14	8	.636	—	—	—	—		
3	Shindle Wingert	1901–1905	38	20	18	.526	—	—	—	—		
4	John Crescenzo	1905–1908	24	14	10	.583	—	—	—	—		
5	Edward McCone	1908–1909	11	8	3	.727	—	—	—	—		
6	Frederick Prosch	1909–1913	37	17	20	.459	—	—	—	—		
7	William Nicolai	1913–1913	57	31	26	.544	—	—	—	—		
8	Elwood Geiges	1918–1919	15	8	7	.533	—	—	—	—		
9	Francois D'Eliscu	1919–1923	52	30	22	.577	—	—	—	—		
10	Sam Dienes	1923–1926	60	39	21	.650	—	—	—	—		
11	James Usilton	1926–1939	284	205	79	.722	66	41	25	.621	1939 NIT Champions	
12	Ernest Messikomer	1939–1942	62	35	27	.565	—	—	—	—		
13	Josh Cody	1942–1952	226	122	104	.540	—	—	—	—	1 NCAA Tournament	
14	Harry Litwack	1952–1973	566	373	193	.659	81	58	23	.716	6 NCAA Tournaments, 2 Final Fours	
15	Don Casey	1973–1982	215	151	94	.616	—	—	—	—	1 NCAA Tournament	
16	John Chaney	1982–2006	769	516	253	.671	396	296	100	.747	17 NCAA Tournaments	
17	Fran Dunphy	2006–2019	432	270	162	.625	220	139	81	.632	8 NCAA Tournaments	
18	Aaron McKie	2019–2023	108	52	56	.481	67	30	37	.448		
18	Adam Fisher	2023–Present	–	–	–	–	–	–	–	–		
