= List of Temple Owls men's basketball seasons =

This is a list of seasons completed by the Temple Owls men's college basketball team.

== Seasons ==
Record table
Season	Coach	Overall	Conference	Standing	Postseason
Charles M. Williams (independent) (1894–1899)
1894–95	Charles M. Williams	8–3			
1895–96	Charles M. Williams	15–7			
1896–97	Charles M. Williams	10–11			
1897–98	Charles M. Williams	22–5			
1898–99	Charles M. Williams	18–6			
Charles M. Williams:		73–32 (.695)			
John Rogers (independent) (1899–1900)
1899–1900	John Rogers	14–8			
John Rogers:		14–8 (.636)			
1900–01	No varsity team				
Harry Shindle Wingert (independent) (1901–1905)
1901–02	Harry Shindle Wingert	8–3			
1902–03	Harry Shindle Wingert	5–6			
1903–04	Harry Shindle Wingert	4–4			
1904–05	Harry Shindle Wingert	3–5			
Harry Shindle Wingert:		20–18 (.526)			
John Crescenzo (independent) (1905–1908)
1905–06	John Crescenzo	3–4			
1906–07	John Crescenzo	5–4			
1907–08	John Crescenzo	6–2			
John Crescenzo:		14–10 (.583)			
Edward McCone (independent) (1908–1909)
1908–09	Edward McCone	8–3			
Edward McCone:		8–3 (.727)			
Frederick Prosch (Southern Intercollegiate Athletic Association) (1909–1913)
1909–10	Frederick Prosch	4–6			
1910–11	Frederick Prosch	3–5			
1911–12	Frederick Prosch	4–4			
1912–13	Frederick Prosch	6–5			
Frederick Prosch:		17–20 (.459)			
William Nicolai (independent) (1913–1917)
1913–14	William Nicolai	5–7			
1914–15	William Nicolai	9–4			
1915–16	William Nicolai	7–6			
1916–17	William Nicolai	10–9			
William Nicolai:		31–26 (.544)			
Elwood Geiges (independent) (1917–1918)
1917–18	Elwood Geiges	8–7			
Elwood Geiges:		8–7 (.533)			
1918–19	No varsity team due to World War I				
M. Francois D'Eliscu (independent) (1919–1923)
1919–20	M. Francois D'Eliscu	9–7			
1920–21	M. Francois D'Eliscu	7–4			
1921–22	M. Francois D'Eliscu	4–8			
1922–23	M. Francois D'Eliscu	10–4			
M. Francois D'Eliscu:		30–23 (.566)			
Sam Dienes (independent) (1923–1926)
1923–24	Samuel Dienes	15–5			
1924–25	Samuel Dienes	12–10			
1925–26	Samuel Dienes	12–6			
Samuel Dienes:		39–21 (.650)			
James Usilton (independent) (1926–1932)
1926–27	James Usilton	14–5			
1927–28	James Usilton	17–5			
1928–29	James Usilton	16–4			
1929–30	James Usilton	18–3			
1930–31	James Usilton	17–4			
1931–32	James Usilton	13–7			
James Usilton (Eastern Intercollegiate Conference) (1932–1939)
1932–33	James Usilton	15–6	5–3	2nd	
1933–34	James Usilton	9–12	5–5	T–3rd	
1934–35	James Usilton	17–7	5–3	2nd	
1935–36	James Usilton	18–6	6–4	T–2nd	
1936–37	James Usilton	17–6	7–3	T–1st	Lost single-game conference playoff
1937–38	James Usilton	23–2	9–1	1st	NIT Champion
1938–39	James Usilton	10–12	4–6	T–5th	
James Usilton:		204–79 (.721)	41–25 (.621)		
Ernest Messikomer (independent) (1939–1942)
1939–40	Ernest Messikomer	13–10			
1940–41	Ernest Messikomer	12–9			
1941–42	Ernest Messikomer	10–8			
Ernest Messikomer:		35–27 (.565)			
Josh Cody (independent) (1942–1952)
1942–43	Josh Cody	11–11			
1943–44	Josh Cody	14–9			NCAA Elite Eight
1944–45	Josh Cody	16–7			
1945–46	Josh Cody	12–8			
1946–-47	Josh Cody	8–12			
1947–48	Josh Cody	12–11			
1948–49	Josh Cody	14–9			
1949–50	Josh Cody	14–10			
1950–51	Josh Cody	12–13			
1951–52	Josh Cody	9–15			
Josh Cody:		122–105 (.537)			
Harry Litwack (independent) (1952–1958)
1952–53	Harry Litwack	16–10			
1953–54	Harry Litwack	15–12			
1954–55	Harry Litwack	11–10			
1955–56	Harry Litwack	27–4			NCAA Final Four
1956–57	Harry Litwack	20–9			NIT third place
1957–58	Harry Litwack	27–3			NCAA University Division Final Four
Harry Litwack (Middle Atlantic Conference) (1958–1973)
1958–59	Harry Litwack	6–19	4–7	9th	
1959–60	Harry Litwack	17–9	9–2	3rd	NIT first round
1960–61	Harry Litwack	20–8	9–1	2nd	NIT quarterfinal
1961–62	Harry Litwack	18–9	8–2	2nd	NIT quarterfinal
1962–63	Harry Litwack	15–7	6–3	4th	
1963–64	Harry Litwack	17–8	6–1	1st	NCAA University Division first round
1964–65	Harry Litwack	14–10	4–3	T–4th	
1965–66	Harry Litwack	21–7	5–3	T–4th	NIT quarterfinal
1966–67	Harry Litwack	20–8	7–0	1st	NCAA University Division first round
1967–68	Harry Litwack	19–9	5–2	T–3rd	NIT first round
1968–69	Harry Litwack	22–8	6–1	1st	NIT Champion
1969–70	Harry Litwack	15–13	2–3	T–3rd (East)	NCAA University Division first round
1970–71	Harry Litwack	13–12	3–3	4th (East)	
1971–72	Harry Litwack	23–8	6–0	1st (East)	NCAA University Division first round
1972–73	Harry Litwack	17–10	5–1	2nd (East)	
Harry Litwack:		373–193 (.659)	72–32 (.692)		
Don Casey (Middle Atlantic Conference) (1973–1974)
1973–74	Don Casey	16–9	4–2	3rd (East)	
Don Casey (East Coast Conference) (1973–1982)
1974–75	Don Casey	7–19	4–2	3rd (East)	
1975–76	Don Casey	9–18	3–2	T–2nd (East)	
1976–77	Don Casey	17–11	4–1	T–1st	
1977–78	Don Casey	24–5	4–1	2nd (East)	
1978–79	Don Casey	25–4	13–0	1st (East)	NCAA Division I first round
1979–80	Don Casey	14–12	8–3	2nd (East)	
1980–81	Don Casey	20–8	9–2	T–2nd (East)	
1981–82	Don Casey	19–8	11–0	1st	
Don Casey:		151–94 (.616)	60–11 (.845)		
John Chaney (Atlantic 10 Conference) (1982–2006)
1982–83	John Chaney	14–15	5–9		
1983–84	John Chaney	26–5	18–0	1st	NCAA Division I second round
1984–85	John Chaney	25–6	15–3	1st	NCAA Division I second round
1985–86	John Chaney	25–6	15–3	T–2nd	NCAA Division I second round
1986–87	John Chaney	32–4	17–1	1st	NCAA Division I second round
1987–88	John Chaney	32–2	18–0	1st	NCAA Division I Elite Eight
1988–89	John Chaney	18–12	15–3	2nd	NIT first round
1989–90	John Chaney	20–11	15–3	1st	NCAA Division I first round
1990–91	John Chaney	24–10	13–5	2nd	NCAA Division I Elite Eight
1991–92	John Chaney	17–13	11–5	2nd	NCAA Division I first round
1992–93	John Chaney	20-13	8-6	T–2nd	NCAA Division I Elite Eight
1993–94	John Chaney	23–8	12–4	2nd	NCAA Division I second round
1994–95	John Chaney	19–11	10–6	T–2nd	NCAA Division I first round
1995–96	John Chaney	20–13	12–4	2nd (East)	NCAA Division I second round
1996–97	John Chaney	20–11	10–6	4th (East)	NCAA Division I second round
1997–98	John Chaney	21–9	13–3	1st (East)	NCAA Division I first round
1998–99	John Chaney	24–11	13–3	1st (East)	NCAA Division I Elite Eight
1999–00	John Chaney	27–6	14–2	1st (East)	NCAA Division I second round
2000–01	John Chaney	24–13	12–4	T–2nd	NCAA Division I Elite Eight
2001–02	John Chaney	19–15	12–4	T–1st (East)	NIT third place
2002–03	John Chaney	18–16	10–6	T–2nd (East)	NIT quarterfinal
2003–04	John Chaney	15–14	9–7	2nd (East)	NIT first round
2004–05	John Chaney	16–14	11–5	2nd (East)	NIT first round
2005–06	John Chaney	17–15	8–8	T–7th	NIT opening round
John Chaney:		516–253 (.671)	296–100 (.747)		
Fran Dunphy (Atlantic 10 Conference) (2006–2013)
2006–07	Fran Dunphy	12–18	6–10	10th	
2007–08	Fran Dunphy	21–13	11–5	T–2nd	NCAA Division I first round
2008–09	Fran Dunphy	22–12	11–5	T–2nd	NCAA Division I first round
2009–10	Fran Dunphy	29–6	14–2	1st	NCAA Division I first round
2010–11	Fran Dunphy	26–8	14–2	2nd	NCAA Division I third round
2011–12	Fran Dunphy	24–8	13–3	1st	NCAA Division I second round
2012–13	Fran Dunphy	24–10	11–5	T–3rd	NCAA Division I third round
Fran Dunphy (American Athletic Conference) (2013–2019)
2013–14	Fran Dunphy	9–22	4–14	9th	
2014–15	Fran Dunphy	26–11	13–5	T–3rd	NIT Semifinal
2015–16	Fran Dunphy	21–11	14–4	1st	NCAA Division I first round
2016–17	Fran Dunphy	16–16	7–11	8th	
2017–18	Fran Dunphy	17–16	8–10	7th	NIT first round
2018–19	Fran Dunphy	23–10	13–5	3rd	NCAA Division I First Four
Fran Dunphy:		270–162 (.625)	139–81 (.632)		
Aaron McKie (American Athletic Conference) (2019–2023)
2019–20	Aaron McKie	14–17	6–12	10th	No postseason held (COVID)
2020–21	Aaron McKie	5–11	4–10	T–8th	
2021–22	Aaron McKie	17–12	10–7	4th	
2022–23	Aaron McKie	16–16	10–8	5th	
Aaron McKie:		52–56 (.481)	30–37 (.448)		
Adam Fisher (American Athletic Conference) (2023–present)
2023–24	Adam Fisher	16–20	5–13	T–10th	
2024–25	Adam Fisher	17–15	9–9	7th	
2025–26	Adam Fisher	16–16	8–10	T–8th	
Adam Fisher:		49–51 (.490)	22–32 (.407)		
Total:		2,026–1,188 (.630)			
National champion Postseason invitational champion Conference regular season champion Conference regular season and conference tournament champion Division regular season champion Division regular season and conference tournament champion Conference tournament champion
