= 1995 Temple Owls football team =

American college football season

1995 Temple Owls football
- Conference: Big East Conference
- Record: 1–10 (1–6 Big East)
- Head coach: Ron Dickerson (3rd season)
- Offensive coordinator: Nick Gasparsto (3rd season)
- Defensive coordinator: Dale Strahm (2nd season)
- Home stadium: Veterans Stadium

1995 Big East Conference football standings
	Conf.			Overall
Team	W		L	W		L
No. 10 Virginia Tech +	6	–	1	10	–	2
No. 20 Miami (FL) +	6	–	1	8	–	3
No. 19 Syracuse	5	–	2	9	–	3
West Virginia	4	–	3	5	–	6
Boston College	4	–	3	4	–	8
Rutgers	2	–	5	4	–	7
Temple	1	–	6	1	–	10
Pittsburgh	0	–	7	2	–	9
+ – Conference co-champions; Rankings from AP Poll

The 1995 Temple Owls football team represented Temple University as a member of the Big East Conference during the 1995 NCAA Division I-A football season. Led by third-year head coach Ron Dickerson, the Owls compiled an overall record of 1–10 with a mark of 1–6 in conference play, placing seventh in the Big East. Temple played home games at Veterans Stadium in Philadelphia.

== Schedule ==
Date	Time	Opponent	Site	Result	Attendance	Source
September 2	7:10 p.m.	at Kansas State*	KSU Stadium; Manhattan, KS	L 7–34	34,927	
September 9	12:00 p.m.	at West Virginia	Mountaineer Field; Morgantown, WV	L 13–24	53,024	
September 16		at No. 7 Penn State*	Beaver Stadium; University Park, PA	L 14–66	95,926	
September 30		Bowling Green*	Veterans Stadium; Philadelphia, PA	L 31–37	3,739	
October 7	12:00 p.m.	at Syracuse	Carrier Dome; Syracuse, NY	L 14–31	40,646	
October 14	6:00 p.m.	Pittsburgh	Veterans Stadium; Philadelphia, PA	W 29–27	4,968	
October 21	2:00 p.m.	at East Carolina*	Dowdy–Ficklen Stadium; Greenville, NC	L 22–32	31,225	
October 28		at Miami (FL)	Miami Orange Bowl; Miami, FL	L 12–36	28,147	
November 4		Boston College	Veterans Stadium; Philadelphia, PA	L 9–10	5,182	
November 11		vs. No. 21 Virginia Tech	Robert F. Kennedy Memorial Stadium; Washington, DC	L 16–38	20,371	
November 18		Rutgers	Veterans Stadium; Philadelphia, PA	L 20–23	3,733	
*Non-conference game; Rankings from AP Poll released prior to the game; All times are in Eastern time

== Roster ==
1995 Temple Owls football team roster
Players
Coaches
Offense

Pos.	#	Name	Class
QB	14	Henry Burris	Jr
OT	69	Roger Chanoine	So
OT	66	Jon Clark	Sr
RB	30	Danny Davis	Jr
OT	78	Eric Johnson	Jr

Defense

Pos.	#	Name	Class
DE	35	Jason Davis	Jr
LB	54	Lance Johnstone	Sr
CB	23	Aaron Patterson	So
LB	94	Alshermond Singleton	Jr
LB	44	Jon Swift	So
DE	38	Tim Terry	Jr
DE	57	Steve Simpkins	So

Special teams

Pos.	#	Name	Class

Head coach

- Ron Dickerson

Coordinators/assistant coaches

Legend

- (C) Team captain
- (S) Suspended
- (I) Ineligible
- Injured
- Redshirt

== Game summaries ==
=== Kansas State ===
Temple Owls at Kansas State Wildcats

Quarter	1	2	3	4	Total
Temple	7	0	0	0	7
Kansas State	10	17	7	0	34

at KSU Stadium, Manhattan, Kansas

- Date: September 2, 1995
- Game time: 7:10 p.m. EST
- Game attendance: 34,927
- Box Score

Game information
First quarter
- TEM - Kersee 58 pass from Burris (Michalski kick)
- KSU - FG Gramatica 26
- KSU - Hickson 5 run (Gramatica kick)

Second quarter

- KSU - Miller 3 run (Gramatica kick)
- KSU - Lockett 15 pass from Miller (Gramatica kick)
- KSU - FG Gramatica 26

Third quarter

- KSU - Schwieger 5 pass from Miller (Gramatica kick)

Fourth quarter

- No scoring

=== West Virginia ===
Temple Owls at West Virginia Mountaineers

Quarter	1	2	3	4	Total
Temple	0	7	0	6	13
West Virginia	0	7	10	7	24

at Mountaineer Field, Morgantown, West Virginia

- Date: September 9, 1995
- Game time: 12:00 p.m. EST
- Game attendance: 53,024
- Box score

Game information
First quarter
- No scoring

Second quarter

- TEM - Lee 1 run (Michalski kick)
- WVU - Gary 2 run (Br. Baumann kick)

Third quarter

- WVU - FG Br. Baumann 36
- WVU - Barber 1 run (Br. Baumann kick)

Fourth quarter

- WVU - Purnell 30 pass from Johnston (Br. Baumann kick)
- TEM - Lee 1 run (two-point conversion failed)

=== Penn State ===
Temple Owls at Penn State Nittany Lions

Quarter	1	2	3	4	Total
Temple	0	7	7	0	14
Penn State	17	14	21	14	66

at Beaver Stadium, State College, Pennsylvania

- Date: September 16, 1995
- Game time: 12:00 p.m. EST
- Game attendance: 95,926
- Box Score

Game information
First quarter
- PSU - Archie 22 run (Conway kick)
- PSU - FG Conway 32
- PSU - Witman 11 pass from Richardson (Conway kick)

Second quarter

- PSU - Engram 26 pass from Richardson (Conway kick)
- PSU - Milne 1 run (Conway kick)
- TEM - Baxter 5 pass from Burris (Michalski kick)

Third quarter

- PSU - Stephenson 4 pass from Richardson (Conway kick)
- PSU - Enis 24 run (Conway kick)
- PSU - Milne 1 run (Barninger kick)
- TEM - Burris 18 run (Michalski kick)

Fourth quarter

- PSU - Enis 1 run (Barninger kick)
- PSU - Enis 6 run (Barninger kick)

=== Bowling Green ===
Bowling Green Falcons at Temple Owls

Quarter	1	2	3	4	Total
Bowling Green	3	10	14	10	37
Temple	0	10	0	21	31

at Veterans Stadium, Philadelphia, Pennsylvania

- Date: September 30, 1995
- Game attendance: 3,739
- Box score

Game information
First quarter
- BGSU - FG Schorejs 49

Second quarter

- BGSU - Cates 14 run (Schorejs kick)
- TEM - Lee 1 run (Michalski kick)
- TEM - FG Michalski 32
- BGSU - FG Schorejs 24

Third quarter

- BGSU - Cates 1 run (Schorejs kick)
- BGSU - Cates 50 pass from Henry (Schorejs kick)

Fourth quarter

- BGSU - Cates 1 run (Schorejs kick)
- TEM - Kersey 45 pass from Burris (Michalski kick)
- BGSU - FG Schorejs 36
- TEM - Baster 27 pass from Burris (Michalski kick)
- TEM - Burris 11 run (Michalski kick)

=== Syracuse ===
Temple Owls at Syracuse Orangemen

Quarter	1	2	3	4	Total
Temple	0	7	0	7	14
Syracuse	7	7	9	8	31

at Carrier Dome, Syracuse, New York

- Date: October 7, 1995
- Game time: 12:00 p.m. EST
- Game attendance: 40,646
- Box score

Game information
First quarter
- SYR - R. Williams 8 pass from D. McNabb (O. Mare kick)

Second quarter

- SYR - Jones 5 run (O. Mare kick)
- TEM - F. Carter 25 run (Michalski kick)

Third quarter

- SYR - FG O Mare 36
- SYR - McIntosh 47 run (kick failed)

Fourth quarter

- SYR - Harrison 42 pass from McNabb (McNabb reception for two-point conversion)
- TEM - K. Walker 3 pass from Burris (Michalski kick)

=== Pitt ===
Pitt Panthers at Temple Owls

Quarter	1	2	3	4	Total
Pitt	0	13	0	14	27
Temple	7	3	7	12	29

at Veterans Stadium, Philadelphia, Pennsylvania

- Date: October 14, 1995
- Game time: 6:00 p.m. EST
- Game attendance: 4,968
- Box score

Game information
First quarter
- TEM - Culbreath 33 run (Michalski kick)

Second quarter

- TEM - FG Michalski 36
- PITT - Schneider 3 run (Ferencik kick)
- PITT - Jells 29 pass from Ryan (kick failed)

Third quarter

- TEM - Lee 1 run (Michalski kick)

Fourth quarter

- PITT - Schneider 1 run (Ferencik kick)
- TEM - Lee 14 run (kick failed)
- TEM - Lee 15 run (two-point conversion failed)
- PITT - Butler 9 pass from Gonzalez (Ferencik kick)

=== East Carolina ===
Temple Owls at East Carolina Pirates

Quarter	1	2	3	4	Total
Temple	0	0	7	15	22
East Carolina	3	10	19	0	32

at Dowdy-Ficklen Stadium, Greenville, North Carolina

- Date: October 21, 1995
- Game time: 2:00 p.m. EST
- Game attendance: 31,225
- Box score

Game information
First quarter
- ECU - FG Holcomb 28

Second quarter

- ECU - Crandell 7 run (Holcomb kick)
- ECU - FG Holcomb 29

Third quarter

- ECU - Nichols 5 pass from Crandell (two-point conversion failed)
- TEM - Johnson 11 pass from Burris (Michalski kick)
- ECU - Harley 7 run (Holcomb kick)
- ECU - Foreman 31 fumble return (Holcomb kick)

Fourth quarter

- TEM - Burris 9 run (Michalski kick)
- TEM - Kersey 23 pass from Burris (Walker reception for two-point conversion)

=== Miami (FL) ===
Temple Owls at Miami Hurricanes

Quarter	1	2	3	4	Total
Temple	3	9	0	0	12
Miami (FL)	7	13	9	7	36

at Miami Orange Bowl, Miami, Florida

- Date: October 28, 1995
- Game attendance: 28,147
- Box score

Game information
First quarter
- UM - German 77 pass from Clement (Prewitt kick)
- TEM - FG Michalski 34

Second quarter

- TEM - V Johnson 39 pass from Burris (Michalski kick)
- UM - Ferguson 23 run (Prewitt kick)
- UM - Ferguson 2 run (kick failed)
- TEM - 2 point defensive conversion by Adams

Third quarter

- UM - FG Prewitt 36
- UM - Clement 1 run (two-point conversion failed)
- UM - German 30 pass from Covington (Prewitt kick)

Fourth quarter

- No scoring

=== Boston College ===
Boston College Eagles at Temple Owls

Quarter	1	2	3	4	Total
Boston College	7	0	3	0	10
Temple	7	0	0	2	9

at Veterans Stadium, Philadelphia, Pennsylvania

- Date: November 4, 1995
- Game attendance: 5,182
- Box score

Game information
First quarter
- BC - O. Walker 5-yard run (D. McGuire kick)
- TEM - H. Burris 10-yard run (Z. Michalski kick)

Second quarter

- No scoring

Third quarter

- BC - D. McGuire 47-yard field goal

Fourth quarter

- TEM - Safety

=== Virginia Tech ===
Temple Owls vs. Virginia Tech Hokies

Quarter	1	2	3	4	Total
Temple	6	3	0	7	16
Virginia Tech	10	21	0	7	38

at RFK Stadium, Washington, DC

- Date: November 11, 1995
- Game attendance: 20,371
- Box score

Game information
First quarter
- VT - FG Larsen 19
- TEM - FG Michalski 41
- TEM - FG Michalski 31
- VT - Still 35 pass from Druckenmiller (Larsen kick)

Second quarter

- VT - Baron 46 fumble return (Larsen kick)
- VT - Price 19 interception return (Larsen kick)
- TEM - FG Michalski 44
- VT - Parker 2 run (Larsen kick)

Third quarter

- No scoring

Fourth quarter

- VT - Parker 1 run (Larsen kick)
- TEM - Kersey 18 pass from Burris (Michalski kick)

=== Rutgers ===
Rutgers Scarlet Knights at Temple Owls

Quarter	1	2	3	4	Total
Rutgers	6	6	0	11	23
Temple	7	7	0	6	20

at Veterans Stadium, Philadelphia, Pennsylvania

- Date: November 18, 1995
- Game attendance: 3,733
- Recap, pg. 126

Game information
First quarter
- RUT - Williams 43-yard interception return (kick failed)
- TEM - Carter 16-yard pass from Burris (Michalski kick)

Second quarter

- TEM - Walker 54-yard pass from Burris (Michalski kick)
- RUT - Harper 8-yard pass from Lucas (pass failed)

Third quarter

- No scoring

Fourth quarter

- RUT - Kucowski 17-yard field goal
- TEM - Culbreath 42-yard run (run failed)
- RUT - Harper 13-yard pass from Lucas (Battaglia pass from Lucas)
