= Temple Owls football, 1900–1909 =

American college football seasons

The Temple Owls football program from 1900 to 1909 was led by five head coaches: John T. Rogers was the head coach from 1899 to 1900 and compiled a 4–8–2 record; Harry Shindle Wingert was the head coach from 1901 to 1905, compiling a 12–9–2 record; Horace Butterworth was the head coach in 1907 and compiled a 4–0–2 record; Frank W. White was the head coach in 1908 and compiled a 3–2–1 record; and William J. Schatz was the head coach from 1909 to 1913 and compiled a 13–13–3 record.

== 1900 ==
1900 Temple Owls football
- Conference: Independent
- Record: 3–4–1
- Head coach: John T. Rogers (2nd season)

The 1900 Temple Owls football team was an American football team that represented Temple University as an independent during the 1900 college football season. In its second and final season under head coach John T. Rogers, the team compiled a 3–4–1 record.

=== Schedule ===
Date	Opponent	Site	Result
	Saint Joseph's		T 0–0
	West Chester Teachers College		L 0–5
	University of Philadelphia		W 40–3
	La Salle		W 12–3
	Eastburn Academy		W 25–6
	Medico-Chirurgical		L 0–5
	Jefferson Medical College		L 6–11
	Pennsylvania Military		L 12–36

== 1901 ==
1901 Temple Owls football
- Conference: Independent
- Record: 3–2
- Head coach: Harry Shindle Wingert (1st season)

The 1901 Temple Owls football team was an American football team that represented Temple University as an independent during the 1901 college football season. In its second season under head coach Harry Shindle Wingert, the team compiled a 3–2 record.

=== Schedule ===
Date	Opponent	Site	Result
	Trenton		L 0–15
	La Salle		W 6–5
	Saint Joseph's		L 0–32
	Philadelphia Dental		W 10–0
	Central Penn		W 21–3

== 1902 ==
1902 Temple Owls football
- Conference: Independent
- Record: 1–4–1
- Head coach: Harry Shindle Wingert (2nd season)

The 1902 Temple Owls football team was an American football team that represented Temple University as an independent during the 1902 college football season. In its second season under head coach Harry Shindle Wingert, the team compiled a 1–4–1 record.

=== Schedule ===
Date	Opponent	Site	Result
	Philadelphia Pharmacy		L 6–11
	Trenton		L 0–12
	Saint Joseph's		T 0–0
	Philadelphia Dental		W 18–12
	Pratt		L 0–21
	Medico-Chirurgical		L 5–6

== 1903 ==
1903 Temple Owls football
- Conference: Independent
- Record: 4–1
- Head coach: Harry Shindle Wingert (3rd season)

The 1903 Temple Owls football team was an American football team that represented Temple University as an independent during the 1913 college football season. In its third season under head coach Harry Shindle Wingert, the team compiled a 4–1 record.

=== Schedule ===
Date	Opponent	Site	Result
	Tioga AC		W 13–6
	Medico-Chirurgical		W 13–6
	Trenton		L 0–6
	Saint Joseph's		W 12–0
	La Salle		W 18–6

== 1904 ==
1904 Temple Owls football
- Conference: Independent
- Record: 2–2
- Head coach: Harry Shindle Wingert (4th season)

The 1904 Temple Owls football team was an American football team that represented Temple University as an independent during the 1904 college football season. In its fourth season under Harry Shindle Wingert, the team compiled a 2–2 record.

=== Schedule ===
Date	Opponent	Site	Result
	Philadelphia Dental		W 21–0
	Medico-Chirurgical		W 30–6
	Pennsylvania Military		L 0–3
	Pratt		L 0–14

== 1905 ==
1905 Temple Owls football
- Conference: Independent
- Record: 2–0–1
- Head coach: Harry Shindle Wingert (5th season)

The 1905 Temple Owls football team was an American football team that represented Temple University as an independent during the 1905 college football season. In its fifth and final season under head coach Harry Shindle Wingert, the team compiled a 2–0–1 record.

=== Schedule ===
Date	Opponent	Site	Result
	La Salle		T 12–12
	Philadelphia Dental		W 30–0
	Medico-Chirurgical		W 6–0

== 1906 ==
No team fielded.

== 1907 ==
1907 Temple Owls football
- Conference: Independent
- Record: 4–0–2
- Head coach: Horace Butterworth (1st season)

The 1907 Temple Owls football team was an American football team that represented Temple University as an independent during the 1907 college football season. In its first and only season under head coach Horace Butterworth, the team compiled a 4–0–2 record.

=== Schedule ===
Date	Opponent	Site	Result
	Schuylkill Navy		W 21–5
	Pennsylvania Military		W 17–6
	Girard College		W 14–0
	Saint Joseph's		T 5–5
	Loyola		W 13–12
	Philadelphia Pharmacy		T 12–12

== 1908 ==
1908 Temple Owls football
- Conference: Independent
- Record: 3–2–1
- Head coach: Frank W. White (1st season)

The 1908 Temple Owls football team was an American football team that represented Temple University as an independent during the 1908 college football season. In its first and only season under head coach Frank W. White, the team compiled a 3–2–1 record.

The season included the first meeting in the Temple–Villanova football rivalry; Villanova won the game by a 12–0 score.

=== Schedule ===
Date	Opponent	Site	Result
	Pennsylvania Military		L 0–22
	La Salle		T 12–12
	Philadelphia Pharmacy		W 6–5
	Girard College		W 25–12
	Loyola		W 12–10
	Villanova	(rivalry)	L 0–12

== 1909 ==
1909 Temple Owls football
- Conference: Independent
- Record: 0–4–1
- Head coach: William J. Schatz (1st season)

The 1909 Temple Owls football team was an American football team that represented Temple University as an independent during the 1909 college football season. In its first under head coach William J. Schatz, the team compiled a 0–4–1 record.

=== Schedule ===
Date	Opponent	Site	Result	Source
October 23	at Lebanon Valley	Annville, PA	L 0–45	
	Pennsylvania Military		L 0–12	
November 6	at Muhlenberg	Muhlenberg Field; Allentown, PA	L 0–26	
	Philadelphia Pharmacy		L 0–18	
	Schuylkill		T 0–0	
