= Temple Owls football, 1910–1919 =

American college football seasons

The Temple Owls football program from 1910 to 1919 was led by three head coaches. William J. Schatz was the head coach from 1909 to 1913 and compiled a 13–14–3 record. William Nicolai was the head coach from 1914 to 1916, compiling a 9–5–3 record. Elwood Geiges was hired as the head coach for the 1917 season, but Temple University opted to cancel the season due to a manpower shortage resulting from World War I. The program did not return until 1922.

== 1910 ==
1910 Temple Owls football
- Conference: Independent
- Record: 3–3
- Head coach: William J. Schatz (2nd season)

The 1910 Temple Owls football team was an American football team that represented Temple University as an independent during the 1910 college football season. In its second season under head coach William J. Schatz, the team compiled a 3–3 record.

=== Schedule ===
Date	Opponent	Site	Result	Source
October 8	at Ursinus	Collegeville, PA	L 0–53	
	Pennsylvania Military		L 6–18	
	Saint Joseph's		W 9–6	
	Girard College		W 21–13	
	Philadelphia Osteopathy		W 22–6	
	Wenonah Military		L 6–27	

== 1911 ==
1911 Temple Owls football
- Conference: Independent
- Record: 6–1
- Head coach: William J. Schatz (3rd season)

The 1911 Temple Owls football team was an American football team that represented Temple University as an independent during the 1911 college football season. In its third season under head coach William J. Schatz, the team compiled a 6–1 record.

=== Schedule ===
Date	Opponent	Site	Result
	Philadelphia Osteopathy		W 21–6
	La Salle		W 25–0
	Pennsylvania Military		L 0–30
	New York Aggies		W 18–12
	Pratt		W 6–0
	Philadelphia Navy Yard		W 13–6
	West Chester		W 7–0

== 1912 ==
1912 Temple Owls football
- Conference: Independent
- Record: 3–2
- Head coach: William J. Schatz (4th season)

The 1912 Temple Owls football team was an American football team that represented Temple University as an independent during the 1912 college football season. In its fourth season under head coach William J. Schatz, the team compiled a 3–2 record.

=== Schedule ===
Date	Opponent	Site	Result
	Pennsylvania Military		L 0–18
	New York Aggies		W 7–6
	Philadelphia Normal		W 18–0
	Pratt		L 7–13
	La Salle		W 6–0

== 1913 ==
1913 Temple Owls football
- Conference: Independent
- Record: 1–3–2
- Head coach: William J. Schatz (5th season)

The 1913 Temple Owls football team was an American football team that represented Temple University as an independent during the 1913 college football season. In its fifth and final season under head coach William J. Schatz, the team compiled a 1–3–2 record.

=== Schedule ===
Date	Opponent	Site	Result
	Pennsylvania Military		L 0–18
	Delaware		L 0–28
	Albright		T 0–0
	Camden Business College		W 12–0
	Saint Joseph's		T 13–13
	La Sallee		L 6–22

== 1914 ==
1914 Temple Owls football
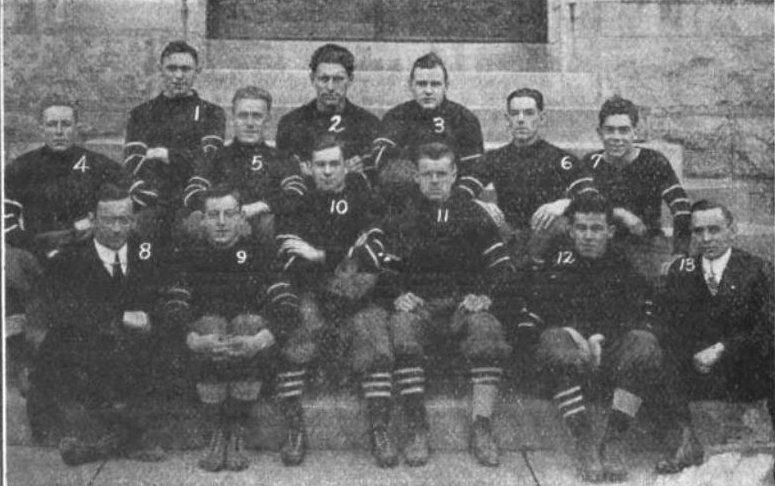
- Conference: Independent
- Record: 3–4–1
- Head coach: William Nicholai (1st season)
- Captain: John H. Rosengarten

The 1914 Temple Owls football team was an American football team that represented Temple University as an independent during the 1914 college football season. The team compiled a 3–4–1 record.

Sources conflict as to who served as the coach of the team. The Temple Football Media Guide states that William Nicholai was the head coach. However, a contemporaneous news account states that Willard Hess was the coach and Nicholai the athletic director.

Sources also conflict as to who served as the team captain. The Media Guide states that John H. Rosengarten was the captain. However, the same contemporaneous news account from September 1914 states that Herbert Shields was elected captain, and Harry Rosenbarden was elected as manager.

Veteran players returning from the 1913 team included Harry Rosenbarden, Herbert Shields, Raymond Eardle, Roy Bressler, William Lemer, John Smith, and George Logia.

Elwood Geiges played at the quarterback position. Geiges later served as a member of the NCAA Football Rules Committee and is credited with inventing the hand signals used by officials, including the signals for holding, offsides, and time out. He was posthumously presented with the National Football Foundation's Outstanding Football Official Award in 1985.

=== Schedule ===
Date	Opponent	Site	Result	Source
October 3	at Atlantic City High School	Atlantic City, NJ	L 0–3	
October 10	at Pennsylvania Military	Stenton Field; Westmoreland, PA	T 0–0	
October 17	at Delaware	Frazer Field; Newark, DE	L 7–20	
	Philadelphia Normal		W 24–12	
	La Salle		W 6–0	
	Bloomsburg		W 13–6	
November 12	at Saint Joseph's	St. Joseph's Field; Lower Merion, PA	L 7–14	
	Albright		L 12–28	

== 1915 ==
1915 Temple Owls football
- Conference: Independent
- Record: 3–1–1
- Head coach: William Nicholai (2nd season)
- Captain: Herbert J. Shields

The 1915 Temple Owls football team was an American football team that represented Temple University as an independent during the 1915 college football season. In its second season under head coach William Nicholai, the team compiled a 3–1–1 record.

=== Schedule ===
Date	Opponent	Site	Result
	Schuylkill		L 0–21
	Philadelphia Navy Yard		W 6–0
	La Salle		W 13–12
	Philadelphia Normal		T 0–0
	Saint Joseph's		W 13–7

== 1916 ==
1916 Temple Owls football
- Conference: Independent
- Record: 3–1–2
- Head coach: William Nicholai (3rd season)
- Captain: Oscar Mueller

The 1916 Temple Owls football team was an American football team that represented Temple University as an independent during the 1916 college football season. In its third and final season under head coach William Nicholai, the team compiled a 3–1–2 record.

=== Schedule ===
Date	Opponent	Site	Result
	La Salle		T 0–0
	Millersville		T 0–0
	Bryn Athyn		L 0–7
	Coatesville		W 20–7
	Philadelphia Normal		W 35–0
	Philadelphia Navy Yard		W 6–0

== 1917 ==
1917 Temple Owls football
- Conference: Independent
- Record: 0–6–1
- Head coach: Elwood Geiges (1st season)

The 1917 Temple Owls football team arranged a full schedule of intercollegiate football games. The team also hired its former star quarterback Elwood Geiges to serve as its head football coach for the 1917 season.

=== Impact of World War I ===
In April 1917, the United States entered World War I, and enrollment at Temple dropped as students either enlisted or were drafted into military service. Approximately 500 Temple students participated in the war.

The war effort reduced the enrollment in Temple's normal school to 15 men. Students in Temple's medical department declined to bolster the ranks of the athletic programs, stating "they cannot spare the time from their scholastic work." In late September, Temple's athletic director William Nicolai announced that, rather than recruiting men from other departments, Temple and Temple Prep would cancel their football seasons.

In the absence of football, the students in the physical training department formed a soccer team. The Evening Ledger reported at the time: "Although most of them have never played the English game, they believe they will have a fair eleven."

=== War benefit game ===
Late in the season, a varsity football team was formed and staged a single match against the freshmen. The game was conducted to raise funds for the war effort and ended in a 6–6 tie.

=== Schedule ===
Date	Opponent	Site	Result
October 6	Pennsylvania Military		L (forfeit)
October 13	Franklin & Marshall		L (forfeit)
	Albright		L (forfeit)
	Moravian		L (forfeit)
	Susquehanna		L (forfeit)
	Lebanon Valley		L (forfeit)
	Temple Prep		T 6–6

== 1918 to 1921 ==
The war continued to impact Temple's enrollment until 1920 when 6,000 students, including more than 300 war veterans, enrolled at the school. The school did not field teams during the 1918, 1919, 1920, and 1921 seasons. It was not until the 1922 season that varsity football returned to Temple.

Coach Geiges did not wait for the return of football to Temple. In 1918, Geiges began a 27-year career as a football official and member of the NCAA Football Rules Committee. He is credited with inventing the hand signals used by officials, including the signals for holding, offsides, and time out. He was posthumously presented with the National Football Foundation's Outstanding Football Official Award in 1985.
