= George Makris =

American football player and coach (1920–2005)

- Makris pictured in Templar 1968

Biographical details
- Born: August 29, 1920
- Died: October 16, 2005 (aged 85); Medford Lakes, New Jersey, U.S.

Playing career
- 1941–1942: Wisconsin
- Position: Guard

Coaching career (HC unless noted)
- 1955–1959: Bolling Air Force Base
- 1960–1969: Temple

Head coaching record
- Overall: 45–44–4 (college)

Accomplishments and honors

Championships
- 1 MAC (1967)

George Makris (August 29, 1920 – October 16, 2005) was an American football coach. He served as the 18th head coach at Temple University in Philadelphia. He held that position for ten seasons, from 1960 until 1969, compiling a record of was 45–44–4. He came to Temple after coaching the Bolling Air Force Base team. He succeeded Peter P. Stevens who was winless in his last season.

Makris coached Bill Cosby during his tenure at Temple, a fact that is alluded to in Cosby's skit "Hofstra" on the 1965 comedy album Why Is There Air?

Makris played at the University of Wisconsin–Madison as a guard. He died in 2005 at his home in Medford Lakes, New Jersey.

== Head coaching record ==
=== College ===
Year	Team	Overall	Conference	Standing	Bowl/playoffs
Temple Owls (Middle Atlantic Conference) (1960–1969)
1960	Temple	2–7	0–5	7th	
1961	Temple	2–5–2	1–2–2	6th	
1962	Temple	3–6	2–3	4th	
1963	Temple	5–3–1	1–2	4th	
1964	Temple	7–2	4–1	T–2nd	
1965	Temple	5–5	3–2	3rd	
1966	Temple	6–3	2–2	3rd	
1967	Temple	7–2	4–0	1st	
1968	Temple	4–6	2–2	5th	
1969	Temple	4–5–1	1–2–1	5th	
Temple:		45–44–4	20–21–3		
Total:		45–44–4			
National championship Conference title Conference division title or championship game berth
