= Albert Barron =

Biographical details
- Born: September 18, 1888; Philadelphia, Pennsylvania, U.S.
- Died: March 27, 1962 (aged 73); Somers Point, New Jersey, U.S.

Playing career
- 1910: Penn State
- 1913–1914: Penn State

Coaching career (HC unless noted)
- 1921–1922: Michigan Agricultural
- 1924: Temple

Administrative career (AD unless noted)
- 1922: Michigan Agricultural
- 1937–1957: Olney HS (PA)

Head coaching record
- Overall: 7–14–2 (college football)

Albert Milton Barron (September 18, 1888 – March 27, 1962) was an American football player, coach of football and track, and college athletics administrator. He served as the head coach at Michigan State Agricultural College—now Michigan State University—from 1921 to 1922, and at Temple University in 1924, compiling a career record of 7–14–2. Barron was the athletic director at Michigan Agricultural in 1922. He also coached track at Temple and at Swarthmore College. He served as the athletic director at Olney High School in Philadelphia from 1937 to 1957 and also coached football there. Barron died on March 27, 1962, in Somers Point, New Jersey, after a heart attack.

== Head coaching record ==
Year	Team	Overall	Conference	Standing	Bowl/playoffs
Michigan Agricultural Aggies (Independent) (1921–1922)
1921	Michigan Agricultural	3–5			
1922	Michigan Agricultural	3–5–2			
Michigan Agricultural:		6–10–2			
Temple Owls (Independent) (1924)
1924	Temple	1–4			
Temple:		1–4			
Total:		7–14–2			
