= Fred H. Swan =

American football player and coach (1902–1993)

- Swan as a college senior in 1926

Biographical details
- Born: July 28, 1902; San Francisco, California, U.S.
- Died: October 27, 1993 (aged 91); Ashland, Oregon, U.S.

Playing career
- 1924–1926: Stanford
- Position: Guard

Coaching career (HC unless noted)

Football
- 1929–1930: Colgate (assistant)
- 1931–1932: Wisconsin (freshmen)
- 1933–1938: Temple (line)
- 1939: Temple
- 1940–1942: Colgate (line)

Boxing
- 1931–1932: Wisconsin
- 1940–1942: Colgate

Head coaching record
- Overall: 2–7

Accomplishments and honors

Championships
- National (1926)

Awards
- Third-team All-American (1926); 3× First-team All-PCC (1924, 1925, 1926)

Frederick Haviside Swan (July 28, 1902 – October 27, 1993) was an American football player and coach. As a senior Swan started at left guard and was the team captain of the 1926 Stanford Indians football team. He was named a third team college All-American following that season.

He was the 13th head football coach at Temple University, serving for one season, in 1939, compiling a record of 2–7. Swan served as line coach at Temple under Pop Warner from 1933 for 1938 before succeeding him as head coach. He was also the head boxing coach at Wisconsin and Colgate.

== Head coaching record ==
Year	Team	Overall	Conference	Standing	Bowl/playoffs
Temple Owls (Independent) (1939)
1939	Temple	2–7			
Temple:		2–7			
Total:		2–7			
