= Temple Owls football, 1894–1899 =

American college football seasons

The Temple Owls football program from 1894 to 1899 was led by two head coaches: Charles M. Williams was the head coach from 1894 to 1898 and compiled a 13–15–1 record; and John T. Rogers was the head coach from 1899 to 1901 and compiled a 4–8–2 record.

== 1894 ==
1894 Temple Owls football
- Conference: Independent
- Record: 4–1
- Head coach: Charles M. Williams (1st season)

The 1894 Temple Owls football team was an American football team that represented Temple University as an independent during the 1894 college football season. In its first season under head coach Charles M. Williams, the team compiled a 4–1 record.

=== Schedule ===
Date	Opponent	Site	Result
	Philadelphia Dental		W 14–6
	First Regiment		W 26–0
	Ursinus		L 0–16
	Crescent Athletic Club		W 12–10
	Central Penn		W 18–0

== 1895 ==
1895 Temple Owls football
- Conference: Independent
- Record: 1–4–1
- Head coach: Charles M. Williams (2nd season)

The 1895 Temple Owls football team was an American football team that represented Temple University as an independent during the 1895 college football season. In its second season under head coach Charles M. Williams, the team compiled a 1–4–1 record.

=== Schedule ===
Date	Opponent	Site	Result
	Schuylkill Navy		T 0–0
	Trenton		L 0–8
	Central Penn		W 30–0
	Stevens		L 0–10
	Pratt		L 0–15
	Ursinus		L 0–56

== 1896 ==
1896 Temple Owls football
- Conference: Independent
- Record: 3–2
- Head coach: Charles M. Williams (3rd season)

The 1896 Temple Owls football team was an American football team that represented Temple University as an independent during the 1896 college football season. In its third season under head coach Charles M. Williams, the team compiled a 3–2 record.

=== Schedule ===
Date	Opponent	Site	Result
	Brooklyn Polytechnic		L 8–16
	Loyola		L 6–14
	Trenton		W 4–2
	Philadelphia Dental		W 6–0
	Central Penn		W 26–0

== 1897 ==
1897 Temple Owls football
- Conference: Independent
- Record: 3–3
- Head coach: Charles M. Williams (4th season)

The 1897 Temple Owls football team was an American football team that represented Temple University as an independent during the 1897 college football season. In its fourth season under head coach Charles M. Williams, the team compiled a 3–3 record.

=== Schedule ===
Date	Opponent	Site	Result
	Eastburn Academy		W 18–3
	Philadelphia Dental		W 22–0
	Loyola		L 6–22
	Central Penn		W 54–10
	St. Francis (NY)		L 0–30
	Philadelphia Pharmacy		L 0–20

== 1898 ==
1898 Temple Owls football
- Conference: Independent
- Record: 2–5
- Head coach: Charles M. Williams (5th season)

The 1898 Temple Owls football team was an American football team that represented Temple University as an independent during the 1898 college football season. In its fifth and final season under Charles M. Williams, the team compiled a 2–5 record.

=== Schedule ===
Date	Opponent	Site	Result
	Oak Lane Athletic Club		L 0–12
	West Chester		L 6–20
	University of Philadelphia		W 3–0
	Schuylkill Navy		W 12–8
	Pennsylvania Military		L 8–15
	Trenton		L 3–40
	Beverly Athletic Club		L 0–38

== 1899 ==
1899 Temple Owls football
- Conference: Independent
- Record: 1–4–1
- Head coach: John T. Rogers (1st season)

The 1899 Temple Owls football team was an American football team that represented Temple University as an independent during the 1899 college football season. In its first season under head coach John T. Rogers, the team compiled a 1–4–1 record.

=== Schedule ===
Date	Opponent	Site	Result
	Saint Joseph's		L 0–10
	Philadelphia Pharmacy		L 0–15
	Ursinus		L (forfeit)
	Eastburn Academy		W 22–0
	University of Philadelphia		T 5–5
	Franklin & Marshall		L 0–96
