= William J. Schatz =

American football coach

Biographical details
- Born: October 20, 1876; Sellersville, Pennsylvania, U.S.
- Died: November 13, 1964 (aged 88); Allentown, Pennsylvania, U.S.

Coaching career (HC unless noted)
- 1909–1913: Temple

Head coaching record
- Overall: 13–14–3

William Jackson Schatz (October 20, 1876 – November 13, 1964) was an American football coach. He was the sixth head football coach at Temple University and he held that position for five seasons, from 1909 until 1913. His record at Temple was 13–14–3. Schatz was later a physician at Allentown, Pennsylvania. He died on November 13, 1964, at Sacred Heart Hospital in Allentown.

== Head coaching record ==
Year	Team	Overall	Conference	Standing	Bowl/playoffs
Temple Owls (Independent) (1909–1913)
1909	Temple	0–4–1			
1910	Temple	3–3			
1911	Temple	6–1			
1912	Temple	3–2			
1913	Temple	1–3–2			
Temple:		13–14–3			
Total:		13–14–3			
