= Ron Dickerson =

American football player and coach (born 1948)

Biographical details
- Born: July 2, 1948 (age 78); Coraopolis, Pennsylvania, U.S.

Playing career
- 1969–1971: Kansas State
- Position: Defensive back

Coaching career (HC unless noted)
- 1973–1975: Kansas State (CB)
- 1976–1978: Louisville (CB)
- 1979–1980: Pittsburgh (CB)
- 1982–1984: Colorado (CB)
- 1985–1990: Penn State (CB)
- 1991–1992: Clemson (DC)
- 1993–1997: Temple
- 1998–1999: Alabama State
- 2010: Lambuth
- 2011: Gardner–Webb (DL)

Head coaching record
- Overall: 19–68

Ron Dickerson (born July 2, 1948) is an American former football player and coach. He served as the head football coach at the Temple University from 1993 until 1997, at Alabama State University from 1998 through 1999, and at Lambuth University in 2010, compiling a career college football coaching record of 19–68.

== Coaching career ==
Dickerson was the head coach at Temple from 1993 to 1997. He was the first black coach in Temple football history. He compiled an 8–47 record at Temple and resigned at the end of the 1997 season.

On January 8, 2010, Dickerson was named head football coach at Lambuth University replacing Hugh Freeze, who accepted a job with Arkansas State University. Lambuth University shut down after the 2010 season.

On July 14, 2011, Dickerson was named defensive line coach at Gardner–Webb University, joining his son Ron Dickerson Jr.'s coaching staff.

== Head coaching record ==
Year	Team	Overall	Conference	Standing	Bowl/playoffs
Temple Owls (Big East Conference) (1993–1997)
1993	Temple	1–10	0–7	8th	
1994	Temple	2–9	0–7	8th	
1995	Temple	1–10	1–6	7th	
1996	Temple	1–10	0–7	8th	
1997	Temple	3–8	3–4	T–5th	
Temple:		8–47	4–31		
Alabama State Hornets (Southwestern Athletic Conference) (1998–1999)
1998	Alabama State	5–6	3–5	T–6th	
1999	Alabama State	2–9	1–3	T–3rd (East)	
Alabama State:		7–15	4–8		
Lambuth Eagles () (2010)
2010	Lambuth	4–6			
Lambuth:		4–6			
Total:		19–68			
