= Horace Butterworth =

American sports coach (1868-1939)

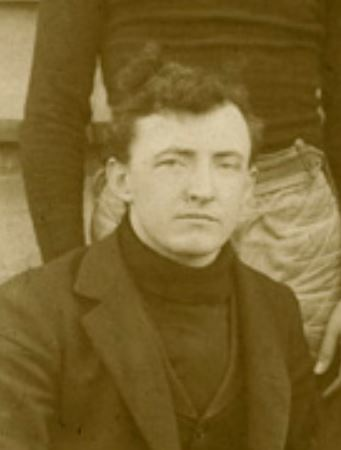

Biographical details
- Born: December 3, 1868
- Died: December 8, 1939 (aged 71); Washington D.C., U.S.
- Education: University of Chicago

Coaching career (HC unless noted)

Football
- 1907: Temple

Basketball
- 1895–1897: Chicago

Baseball
- 1903: Northwestern

Administrative career (AD unless noted)
- 1903–1904: Northwestern

Head coaching record
- Overall: 4–0–2 (football); 10–4 (basketball); 17 games (baseball)

Horace C. Butterworth (December 3, 1868 – December 8, 1939) was an American sports coach, college athletics administrator, and educator. He was the first head coach of the Chicago Maroons men's basketball team at the University of Chicago, serving for two seasons, from 1895 to 1897. Butterworth was the head coach of the Northwestern Wildcats baseball team at Northwestern University in 1903 and the school's athletic director from 1904 to 1904. He was also the football coach at Temple University for one season, in 1907.

Butterworth attended Delaware College—now known as the University of Delaware—for his undergraduate studies, and completed his doctorate from the University of Chicago in 1898. Even though he had a record of 10–4, his time as the Chicago Maroons men's basketball coach was cut short when the university suspended the program based on a lack of interest. In his only season as the Northwestern Wildcats baseball coach, his team played a 17-game season, of which 12 games were against Western Conference opponents.

Butterworth was later supervisor of physical education at East Side High School in Newark, New Jersey. A resident of Dunellen, New Jersey, he died on December 8, 1939, in Washington, D.C.

== Head coaching record ==
=== Football ===
Year	Team	Overall	Conference	Standing	Bowl/playoffs
Temple Owls (Independent) (1907)
1907	Temple	4–0–2			
Temple:		4–0–2			
Total:		4–0–2			
