= Stan Drayton =

American football player and coach (born 1971)

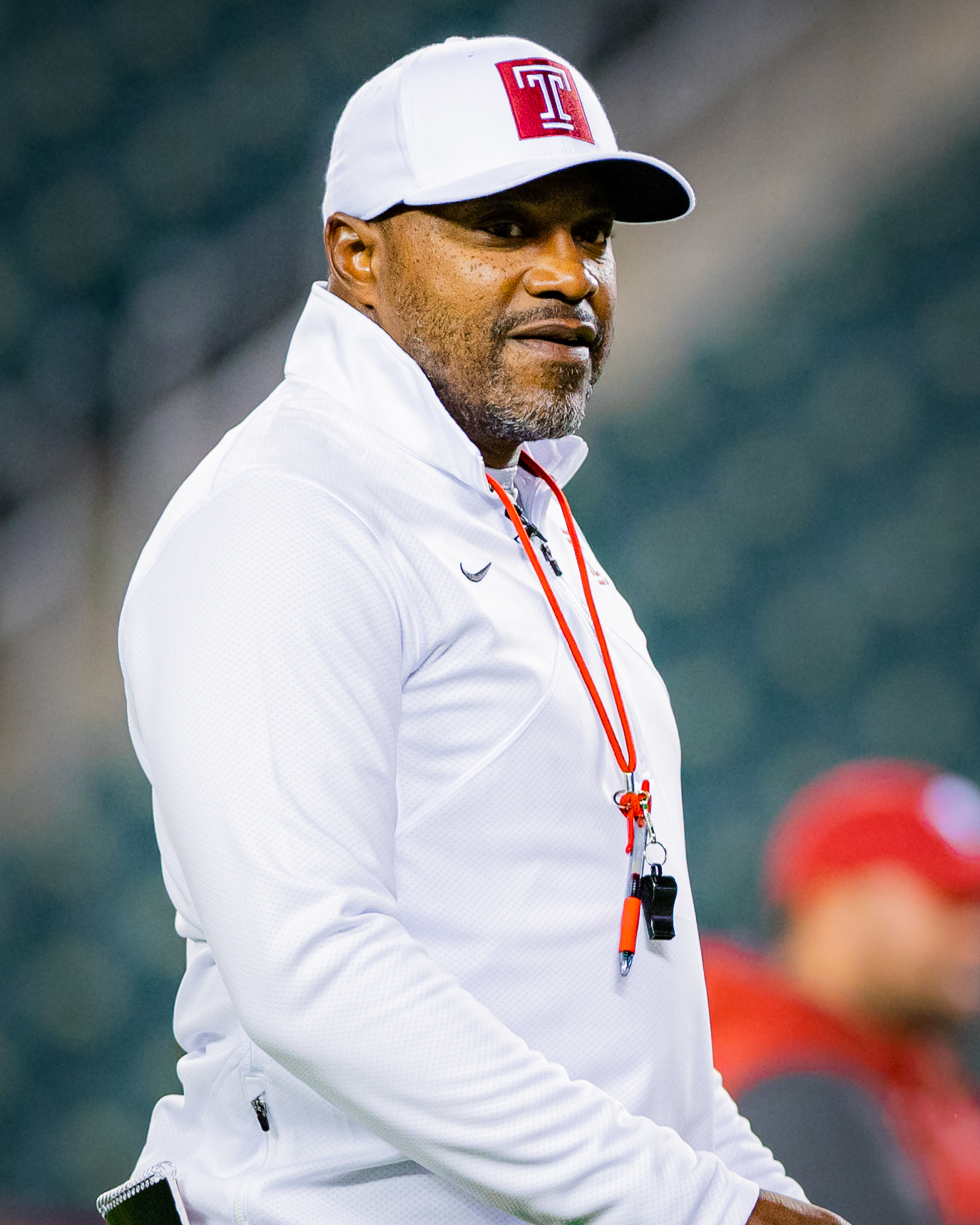
- Drayton in 2022

Current position
- Title: Running backs coach
- Team: South Carolina
- Conference: SEC

Biographical details
- Born: March 11, 1971 (age 55); Cleveland, Ohio, U.S.

Playing career
- 1989–1992: Allegheny
- Position: Running back

Coaching career (HC unless noted)
- 1993: Allegheny (RB)
- 1994: Eastern Michigan (RB)
- 1995: Penn (RB)
- 1996–1999: Villanova (RB)
- 2000: Bowling Green (RB)
- 2001–2003: Green Bay Packers (OQC/ST)
- 2004: Mississippi State (RB)
- 2005–2007: Florida (RB)
- 2008: Tennessee (RB)
- 2009: Syracuse (RB)
- 2010: Florida (RB)
- 2011: Ohio State (WR)
- 2012–2014: Ohio State (RB)
- 2015–2016: Chicago Bears (RB)
- 2017–2021: Texas (AHC/RB/RGC)
- 2022–2024: Temple
- 2025: Penn State (RB)
- 2026–present: South Carolina (RB)

Head coaching record
- Overall: 9–25

Stanley Drayton (born March 11, 1971) is an American football coach who is currently the running backs coach at the University of South Carolina. He formerly served as the head football coach at Temple. He previously served as the running backs coach at Penn State, associate head coach, running backs coach, and run game coordinator at Texas, running backs coach at Ohio State and also coached running backs in the National Football League (NFL) for the Chicago Bears.

== Biography ==
Drayton was born on March 11, 1971, in Cleveland, Ohio. He attended Allegheny College, where he played running back on the football team. As a sophomore, Drayton helped lead the Gators to the 1990 NCAA Division III national championship and ended his career as the top rusher in Division III history (a record later broken). He also competed in track and field, winning numerous NCAC titles, and earned all-conference honors in both sports. Drayton is married to Monique Fuller and has two children. Drayton's uncle was a gold medal-winning Olympic track athlete, Paul Drayton.

== Career ==
=== Early career ===
Drayton held running back coaching positions with the Eastern Michigan Eagles (1994), Penn Quakers (1995), Villanova Wildcats (1996–1999), and Bowling Green Falcons (2000), before being hired by the Green Bay Packers as Assistant Offensive Quality Control and Special Teams Coach from 2001 to 2003.

Following his time with the Packers he worked as a running backs coach with the Mississippi State Bulldogs (2004), Florida Gators (2005–2007), Tennessee Volunteers (2008), and Syracuse Orange (2009). He returned to the Gators for the 2010 campaign.

In January 2011, Drayton was hired as a wide receivers coach by the Ohio State Buckeyes. Following the 2011 season, he was reassigned to the role of running backs coach, under new head coach Urban Meyer (his former boss and mentor at Florida). He also served as assistant head coach in 2013 and 2014. Under Drayton's tutelage, Buckeye running back Carlos Hyde recorded 1,521 yards and 15 touchdowns, while also recording the eighth-highest yardage per game in the nation with 126.8. In 2014, Drayton guided Ezekiel Elliott to 1,878 yards, third-most in the country and the second-most in Ohio State history.

=== Chicago Bears ===
In February 2015, Drayton was hired as a running backs coach for the Chicago Bears. In Drayton's first year, the running back trio of Matt Forte, Jeremy Langford and Ka'Deem Carey ended the 2015 season sixth in rushing attempts with 469 and 11th in total rushing yards with 1,851. The group also ranked 11th in the league in rushing yards per game with 115.7. Forte led the three in attempts (218), yards (898) and yards per attempt (4.1) despite not playing in three due to injury, while Langford had the most touchdowns with six. Playing in eleven games, Carey scored twice on 43 attempts. A year later, with Drayton, rookie Jordan Howard recorded 1,313 rushing yards in 2016, the second-highest in the NFL behind Elliott.

=== Texas ===
Drayton returned to the college ranks in 2017, joining the Texas Longhorns.

=== Temple ===
On December 15, 2021, Drayton and Temple agreed to terms for him to become the next head football coach of the Owls. On September 10, 2022, Drayton won his first game as the head coach of the Owls against the Lafayette Leopards. Temple fired Drayton on November 17, 2024, with two games remaining in the 2024 season. Drayton's record at Temple was 9–25, with no postseason appearances. Defensive coordinator Everett Withers succeeded Drayton as interim head coach.

== Head coaching record ==
Year	Team	Overall	Conference	Standing	Bowl/playoffs
Temple Owls (American Athletic Conference) (2022–2024)
2022	Temple	3–9	1–7	10th	
2023	Temple	3–9	1–7	T–13th	
2024	Temple	3–7	2–4	(Note: Temple fired Drayton with two games remaining.)	
Temple:		9–25	4–18		
Total:		9–25			
