= Frank W. White =

American football coach and professor

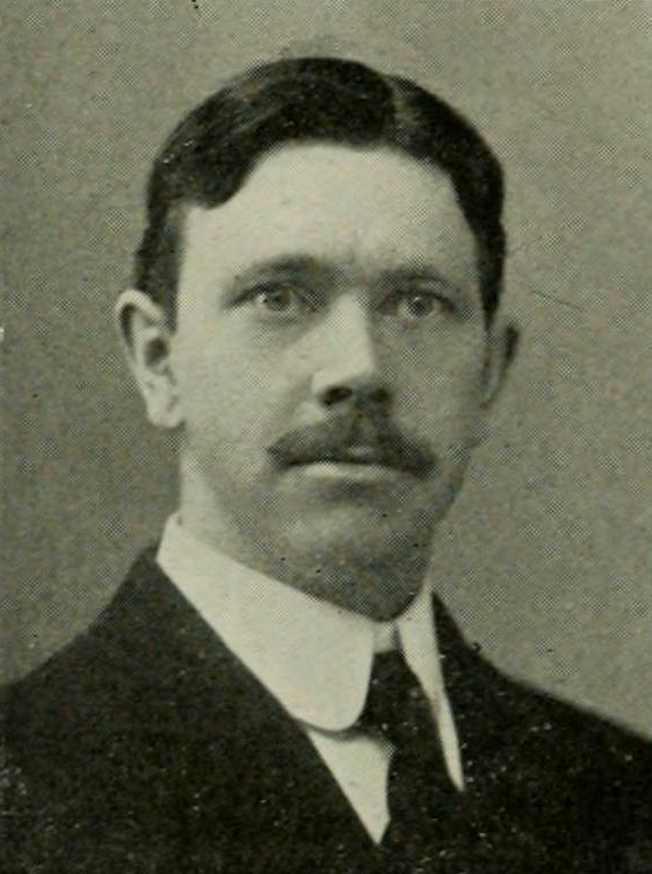
- White pictured in Epitome 1911, Lehigh yearbook

Biographical details
- Born: March 27, 1880; Arlington, Massachusetts, U.S.
- Died: March 14, 1947 (aged 66); Rockwood, Pennsylvania, U.S.
- Education: Tufts University

Coaching career (HC unless noted)
- 1908: Temple

Head coaching record
- Overall: 3–2–1

Frank Warren White (March 17, 1880 – March 14, 1947) was an American football coach and professor of physical education. He was the fifth head football coach at Temple University in Philadelphia, Pennsylvania, serving for one season, in 1908, and compiling a record of 3–2–1. In 1909, he was appointed as assistant professor of physical education at Lehigh University.

White practiced medicine in Rockwood, Pennsylvania from 1924 to 1942 and then in Jenners, Pennsylvania until he was incapacitated, breaking his hip in a fall on February 1, 1946. He died suddenly, on March 14, 1947, at his home in Rockwood.

== Head coaching record ==
Year	Team	Overall	Conference	Standing	Bowl/playoffs
Temple Owls (Independent) (1908)
1908	Temple	3–2–1			
Temple:		3–2–1			
Total:		3–2–1			
