= Ernest Messikomer =

American basketball coach (1912–1973)

Biographical details
- Born: August 19, 1912
- Died: June 29, 1973 (aged 60)

Playing career

Men's basketball
- 1934–1937: Temple

Coaching career (HC unless noted)

Men's basketball
- 1937–1939: Lansdale HS (PA)
- 1939–1942: Temple

Baseball
- 1946: Temple

Head coaching record
- Overall: 35–27 (.565) (men's basketball); 6–2 (.750) (baseball)

Ernest L. Messikomer (August 19, 1912 – June 29, 1973) was an American basketball player and coach who was the head coach of the Temple Owls men's basketball from 1939 to 1942.

== Playing ==
Messikomer played basketball at West Philadelphia High School and Temple University. He made Temple's varsity team in 1934 and was captain during the 1935–36 season.

== Coaching ==
After graduating, Messikomer spent two seasons as a commercial subjects teacher and basketball coach at Lansdale High School in Lansdale, Pennsylvania. In 1939, he was named Temple's head men's basketball coach. He succeeded his head coach, James Usilton, who died two days after the 1938–39 season. Messikomer compiled a 35–27 record over three seasons. He resigned in 1942 and entered the United States Navy. He was a physical instructor and basketball coach at the Pre-Flight School at the University of North Carolina at Chapel Hill. He returned to Temple in 1946 as baseball coach. He was replaced after one season by assistant football coach Peter P. Stevens.
