= Frederick Prosch =

American athlete and coach (1912–1973)

Biographical details
- Born: January 24, 1883; Newark, New Jersey, U.S.
- Died: December 19, 1947 (aged 64); Pittsburgh, Pennsylvania, U.S.

Coaching career (HC unless noted)

Gymnastics
- 1905–1906: Yale

Men's basketball
- 1907–1909: Connellsville HS (PA)
- 1909–1913: Temple
- 1916–1920: Atlantic City HS

Head coaching record
- Overall: 17–20 (.459) (college basketball)

Frederick Prosch Jr. (January 24, 1883 – December 19, 1947) was an American gymnast and athletic instructor who was a member of the faculty at Temple University from 1909 to 1914 and 1929 to 1947. From 1909 to 1913, he was head coach of the Temple Owls men's basketball team.

== Biography ==
Prosch was an athlete at the Turn Verein and YMCA in Newark, New Jersey. He competed in the YMCA Gymnastics Championships at the 1904 St. Louis World's Fair and won gold in the sidehorse vault, silver in the vault, and bronze in the parallel bars. He was also a standout football, baseball, and basketball player.

In 1905, Prosch became the gymnastics coach and assistant instructor at Yale University. In 1907, he became the physical director of the YMCA in Connellsville, Pennsylvania. He was also head coach of the Connellsville High School boy's basketball team.

Prosch took a special course in physical education at Temple University and later earned his bachelor of science and master of education degrees from the university. He spent five years as a physical education instructor at Temple and was coach of the men's basketball team from 1909 to 1913.

After leaving Temple, Prosch worked as a playground supervisor in Newark and Atlantic City, New Jersey. From 1916 to 1920, he was a physical instructor and boy's basketball coach at Atlantic City High School. He then served as the head of physical training at the State Normal School in Trenton. In 1923, he was appointed to the same position at the Glassboro Normal School.

In 1929, Prosch returned to Temple as the head of the health and physical education department. On December 19, 1947, he attended a convention of physical education teachers in Pittsburgh and appeared on a WWSW-FM broadcast. He suffered a heart attack that evening and was pronounced dead on arrival at Mercy Hospital.
