= Sam Dienes =

American basketball player and coach (1893–1971)

Biographical details
- Born: November 24, 1893
- Died: October 9, 1971 (aged 77)

Playing career
- 1912–1914: Garnets
- 1914–1915: Girard
- 1916–1917: Plymouth Shawnees
- 1917–1918: Girard
- 1918–1919: Midvale
- 1920–1922: Camden Skeeters

Coaching career (HC unless noted)
- 1923–1926: Temple

Head coaching record
- Overall: 39–21 (.650)

Samuel Leroy Dienes (November 24, 1893 – October 9, 1971) was an American basketball player and coach. He played for the Garnet, Girard, and Midvale clubs of Philadelphia, the Plymouth Shawnees of the Pennsylvania State Basketball League, and the Camden Skeeters of the Eastern Basketball League. He compiled a 39–21 record as head coach of the Temple Owls men's basketball team from 1923 to 1926.
