= Charles M. Williams (coach) =

American football and basketball coach

Biographical details
- Education: Springfield College

Coaching career (HC unless noted)

Football
- 1894–1898: Temple

Basketball
- 1894–1899: Temple

Head coaching record
- Overall: 13–15–1 (football); 73–32 (basketball)

Charles M. Williams was the first head football and men's basketball coach for the Temple University Owls located in Philadelphia, Pennsylvania, and he held that position for five seasons, from 1894 until 1898. His overall coaching record for Temple football was 13 wins, 15 losses, and 1 tie. This ranks him ninth at Temple in terms of total wins and tenth at Temple in terms of winning percentage. For basketball, he posted a 73–32 record.

== Head coaching record ==
=== Football ===
Year	Team	Overall	Conference	Standing	Bowl/playoffs
Temple Owls (Independent) (1894–1898)
1894	Temple	4–1			
1895	Temple	1–4–1			
1896	Temple	3–2			
1897	Temple	3–3			
1898	Temple	2–5			
Temple:		13–15–1			
Total:		13–15–1			
