= John T. Rogers (coach) =

American football and basketball coach

Coaching career (HC unless noted)

Football
- 1899–1900: Temple

Basketball
- 1899–1900: Temple

Head coaching record
- Overall: 4–8–2 (football); 14–8 (basketball)

John T. Rogers was an American football and basketball coach. He was the second head football coach at Temple University in Philadelphia, serving for two seasons, from 1899 to 1900, and compiling a record of 4–8–2. Rogers was also the second head basketball coach at Temple, posting a 14–8 record in one season, 1899–1900.

== Head coaching record ==
=== Football ===
Year	Team	Overall	Conference	Standing	Bowl/playoffs
Temple Owls (Independent) (1899–1900)
1899	Temple	1–4–1			
1900	Temple	3–4–1			
Temple:		4–8–2			
Total:		4–8–2			
