= M. Francois D'Eliscu =

American sports coach (1895–1972)

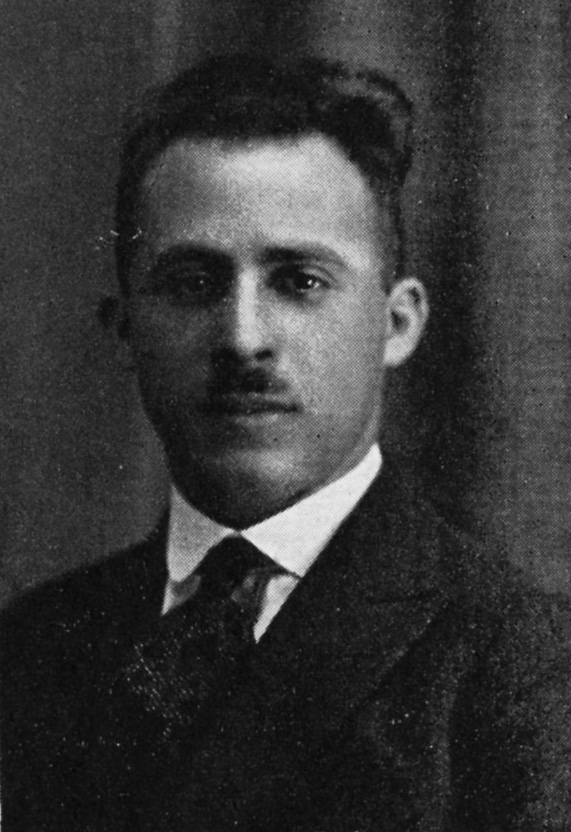
- D'Eliscu pictured in Templar 1923, Temple yearbook

Biographical details
- Born: November 10, 1895; New York, New York, U.S.
- Died: October 15, 1972 (aged 76); Sarasota, Florida, U.S.

Coaching career (HC unless noted)

Football
- 1922–1923: Temple

Basketball
- 1919–1923: Temple

Administrative career (AD unless noted)
- 1946–1947: Hawaii

Head coaching record
- Overall: 1–9–1 (football); 30–22 (basketball)

Milton Francois D'Eliscu (November 10, 1895 – October 15, 1972) was an American military officer, football and basketball coach, and college athletics administrator. He served as the head football coach at Temple University from 1922 to 1923, compiling a record of 1–9–1. D'Eliscu was also the head basketball coach at Temple from 1919 to 1923, tallying a mark of 30–22. D'Eliscu was the athletic director at the University of Hawaii at Manoa from 1946 to 1947. he was an alumnus of Swarthmore College.

During World War I, D'Eliscu was stationed as an athletic director and instructor, also teaching bayonet fight. He taught combatives during World War II, instructing groups of servicemen including Army Rangers in wrestling, judo, boxing, and street fighting techniques. D'Eliscu participated in the invasion of Makin Atoll and was awarded the Silver Star.

His younger brother was lyricist and writer Edward Eliscu.

D'Eliscu died on October 15, 1972, in Sarasota, Florida.

== Head coaching record ==
=== Football ===
Year	Team	Overall	Conference	Standing	Bowl/playoffs
Temple Owls (Independent) (1922–1923)
1922	Temple	1–4–1			
1923	Temple	0–5			
Temple:		1–9–1			
Total:		1–9–1			

== Bibliography ==
- D'Eliscu, Francois (1943). How to Prepare for Military Fitness. New York: W. W. Norton & Company. LCCN 43006734.
- D'Eliscu, Francois (1945). Hand to Hand Combat. Infantry School (U.S.).
