= Peter P. Stevens =

American college sports coach (1909–1989)

- Stevens (right) discusses a play with a player

Biographical details
- Born: June 18, 1909; Wilkes-Barre, Pennsylvania, U.S.
- Died: May 5, 1989 (aged 79); West Melbourne, Florida, U.S.

Playing career

Football
- 1933–1935: Temple
- 1936: Philadelphia Eagles
- Position: Center

Coaching career (HC unless noted)

Football
- 1937–1940: Ursinus (assistant)
- 1941–1943: Ursinus
- 1946: Ursinus
- 1947–1955: Temple (assistant)
- 1956–1959: Temple
- 1960: Drexel (assistant)

Basketball
- 1942–1943: Ursinus

Baseball
- 1947–1952: Temple

Head coaching record
- Overall: 8–44–3 (football); 3–4 (basketball); 40–52 (baseball)

Peter P. Stevens (June 18, 1909 – May 5, 1989) was an American football player and coach of football, basketball, and baseball. He played college football at Temple University from 1933 to 1935 and professionally in the National Football League (NFL) with the Philadelphia Eagles in 1936. Stevens served as the head football coach at Ursinus College from 1941 to 1943 and again in 1946 and at his alma mater, Temple, from 1956 to 1959, compiling a career college football coaching record of 8–44–3. In 1960, he became an assistant football coach at Drexel. He was also the head basketball coach at Ursinus in 1942–43 and the head baseball coach at Temple from 1947 to 1952. Stevens died on May 5, 1989, at his home in West Melbourne, Florida.

== Head coaching record ==
=== Football ===
Year	Team	Overall	Conference	Standing	Bowl/playoffs
Ursinus Bears (Eastern Pennsylvania Collegiate Conference) (1941–1942)
1941	Ursinus	0–6–2	0–3	4th	
1942	Ursinus	1–2–1	1–2–1	3rd	
Ursinus Bears (Independent) (1943)
1943	Ursinus	1–3			
Ursinus Bears (Independent) (1946)
1946	Ursinus	2–5			
Ursinus:		4–16–3	1–5–1		
Temple Owls (Independent) (1956–1957)
1956	Temple	3–5			
1957	Temple	1–6			
Temple Owls (Middle Atlantic Conference) (1958–1959)
1958	Temple	0–8	0–5	7th (University)	
1959	Temple	0–9	0–5	7th (University)	
Temple:		4–28	0–10		
Total:		8–44–3			
