= Elwood Geiges =

American football player, coach, and official (1895–1977)

Biographical details
- Born: August 26, 1895; Philadelphia, Pennsylvania, U.S.
- Died: October 22, 1977 (aged 82); Devon, Pennsylvania, U.S.
- Education: Temple University

Playing career

Football
- 1912–1914: Temple
- Position: Quarterback

Coaching career (HC unless noted)

Football
- 1917: Temple
- 1918–1929: Frankford HS (PA)
- 1930–1932: Haverford

Basketball
- 1917–1918: Temple

Head coaching record
- Overall: 5–22–1 (college football); 8–7 (college basketball)

Elwood Albert Geiges (August 26, 1895 – October 22, 1977) was an American football player, coach, and official. He was the eighth head football coach at Temple University and he held that position for the 1917 season. His record at Temple was 0–6–1.

== Head coaching record ==
=== College football ===
Year	Team	Overall	Conference	Standing	Bowl/playoffs
Temple Owls (Independent) (1917)
1917	Temple	0–6–1			
Temple:		0–6–1			
Haverford Fords (Independent) (1930–1932)
1930	Haverford	2–5–1			
1931	Haverford	2–6			
1932	Haverford	1–5			
Haverford:		5–16–1			
Total:		5–22–1			
