= Harry Shindle Wingert =

American football and basketball coach

Biographical details
- Born: August 17, 1865; Lancaster, Pennsylvania, U.S.
- Died: May 11, 1928 (aged 62); Lancaster, Pennsylvania, U.S.

Coaching career (HC unless noted)

Football
- 1899: Franklin & Marshall
- 1901–1905: Temple

Basketball
- 1899–1900: Franklin & Marshall
- 1901–1905: Temple

Head coaching record
- Overall: 16–14–3 (football); 20–19 (basketball)

Harry Shindle Wingert (August 17, 1865 – May 11, 1928) was an American football and basketball coach.

== Biography ==
Wingert served as the head football coach at Franklin & Marshall College in 1899 and at Temple University from 1901 to 1905, compiling a career college football record of 16–14–3. Wingert was also the head basketball coach at Franklin & Marshall for the 1899–1900 season and at Temple from 1901 to 1905, tallying a career college basketball mark of 20–19.

He later served as director of the student health services at Ohio State University.

== Head coaching record ==
=== Football ===
Year	Team	Overall	Conference	Standing	Bowl/playoffs
Franklin & Marshall (Independent) (1899)
1899	Franklin & Marshall	3–5–1			
Franklin & Marshall:		3–5–1			
Temple Owls (Independent) (1901–1905)
1901	Temple	3–2			
1902	Temple	1–4–1			
1903	Temple	4–1			
1904	Temple	3–2			
1905	Temple	2–0–1			
Temple:		13–9–2			
Total:		16–14–3			
