= William Nicolai =

American sports coach

Biographical details
- Born: May 15, 1890; Union Hill, New Jersey, U.S.
- Died: November 25, 1958 (aged 68); Philadelphia, Pennsylvania, U.S.

Coaching career (HC unless noted)

Football
- 1914–1916: Temple

Basketball
- 1913–1917: Temple

Head coaching record
- Overall: 9–5–3 (football)

William Alvin Nicolai (May 15, 1890 - November 25, 1958) was the seventh head football coach at Temple University, a position he held for three seasons, from 1914 until 1916. His overall coaching record at Temple was 9–5–3. In his final season at Temple, his team played six games and allowed only 14 points in the entire season.

Nicolai also served as a professor at Temple.

== Head coaching record ==
=== Football ===
Year	Team	Overall	Conference	Standing	Bowl/playoffs
Temple Owls (Independent) (1914–1916)
1914	Temple	3–3			
1915	Temple	3–1–1			
1916	Temple	3–1–2			
Temple:		9–5–3			
Total:		9–5–3			
