= Temple Owls football =

Football team of Temple University

2026 Temple Owls football team
- First season: 1894; 132 years ago
- Athletic director: Arthur Johnson
- Head coach: K. C. Keeler; 2nd season, 5–7 (.417)
- Location: Philadelphia, Pennsylvania
- Stadium: Lincoln Financial Field (capacity: 68,532)
- NCAA division: Division I FBS
- Conference: American
- Colors: Cherry and white
- All-time record: 502–632–52 (.445)
- Bowl record: 3–6 (.333)

Conference championships
- MAC: 1967 American: 2016

Division championships
- MAC East: 2009 AAC East: 2015, 2016
- Consensus All-Americans: 3
- Rivalries: Villanova (rivalry); Penn State; Rutgers; Buffalo
- Fight song: "Fight! Temple Fight!"
- Mascot: Hooter T. Owl, Stella (live mascot)
- Marching band: Temple University Diamond Marching Band
- Outfitter: Nike
- Website: owlsports.com

The Temple Owls football team represents Temple University in the sport of college football. The Temple Owls compete in the NCAA Division I Football Bowl Subdivision as a member of the American Conference. They play their home games at Lincoln Financial Field in Philadelphia.

The Owls were a football-only member of the Big East Conference from 1991 until 2004. Temple was expelled from the league due to a lack of commitment to the football program from university officials. Temple played the 2005 and 2006 seasons as an independent before playing in the Mid-American Conference (MAC) from 2007 to 2011.

In March 2012, the Owls rejoined the Big East Conference, with football membership beginning in the 2012 season and all other sports beginning conference play in 2013. After several basketball-only schools split off to form a new conference that kept the Big East name, Temple remained in the reorganized American Athletic Conference.

== History ==
=== Early history ===
Temple began playing organized football in 1894, a decade after the school was founded. Physical education instructor and basketball coach Charles M. Williams organized an 11-man squad that won their first game against Philadelphia Dental College. For its first few years, the football team played small schools and there are few records of its games.

The Owls' modern era began in 1925. That was the year that Henry J. "Heinie" Miller was hired as head coach, and for a time, the Owls were a regional power. In the 1927 season, after wildly mismatched victories over Blue Ridge College (110–0), Juniata (58–0), Gallaudet (62–0) and Washington College (75–0), Temple seemed to upgrade its schedule. Their only loss that season came from Dartmouth, and a 44-year long rivalry with Bucknell College began with Temple posting a 19–13 victory. To start the 1928 season, the Owls moved to Temple Stadium, and won its first six home games in shutouts. Miller coached eight seasons and compiled a 50–15–8 record, with two notable victories over growing regional football power Penn State.

Temple Stadium was built with lights, and Temple football was an early adopter of night football games. Temple played its first night game at Temple Stadium on September 26, 1930, defeating Thiel College 13–6 under the floodlights. From 1930 through 1932, Temple played the most night games of the Eastern teams, winning 13, tying three, and losing none.

=== Pop Warner era (1934–1938) ===
Coach Pop Warner giving a chalk talk to the team in 1937

Following Miller's departure in 1933, the Owls made a national splash with the hiring of their next coach, the legendary Glenn "Pop" Warner. Warner had spent the previous 19 years at Pittsburgh and Stanford, winning three national championships. He ended his career at Temple, going 31–18–2 in six seasons. In 1934, the Owls went 7–0–2 in the regular season and were invited to play in the inaugural Sugar Bowl on New Year's Day, 1935, where they lost to undefeated Tulane, 20–14. In 1936, the Owls were ranked in the AP Poll in its first year for two weeks. In Warner's last game, Temple upset Florida 20–12, who were coached by future Temple coach Josh Cody.

=== Post-Warner era (1939–1959) ===
From the time Warner retired at the end of the 1938 season until 1963, the Owls experienced only 4 winning seasons. Warner's top assistant, Fred H. Swan, took over as head coach in 1939. He lasted one season before Temple hired SMU coach Ray Morrison. During this time, Temple had several successful seasons and had All-American (honorable mention) and All-Star players. The Owls got off to a 6–1 start in 1941, defeating rivals Penn State, Bucknell, and Villanova that season. The 1945 season brought a 6–0 start and hopes of going to one of two bowl games: the Orange Bowl and the prestigious Cotton Bowl. However, even with a 7–1 season record, Temple did not receive either bid. After the 1940s, Temple's program began to decline. The team reached a nadir in the late 1950s, enduring a school record 21-game losing streak from the last four games of the 1957 season and through the entire 1958 and 1959 seasons.

=== George Makris era (1960–1969) ===
George Makris arrived as head coach to start the 1960 season and won his first game, against Kings Point. Makris restored competitiveness to the Owl program, compiling a 10-year record of 45–44–4. Makris' tenure coincided with Temple's 10 years in the University Division of the Middle Atlantic Conference, during which they won the 1967 conference championship. In 1966, led by a Temple single-game record five touchdown passes by quarterback John Waller to receiver Jim Callahan (whose first 10 receptions that year went for touchdowns, all thrown by Waller), Markis brought "the Old Shoe" back to Broad Street by defeating Bucknell for the first time in 12 years.

=== Wayne Hardin era (1970–1982) ===
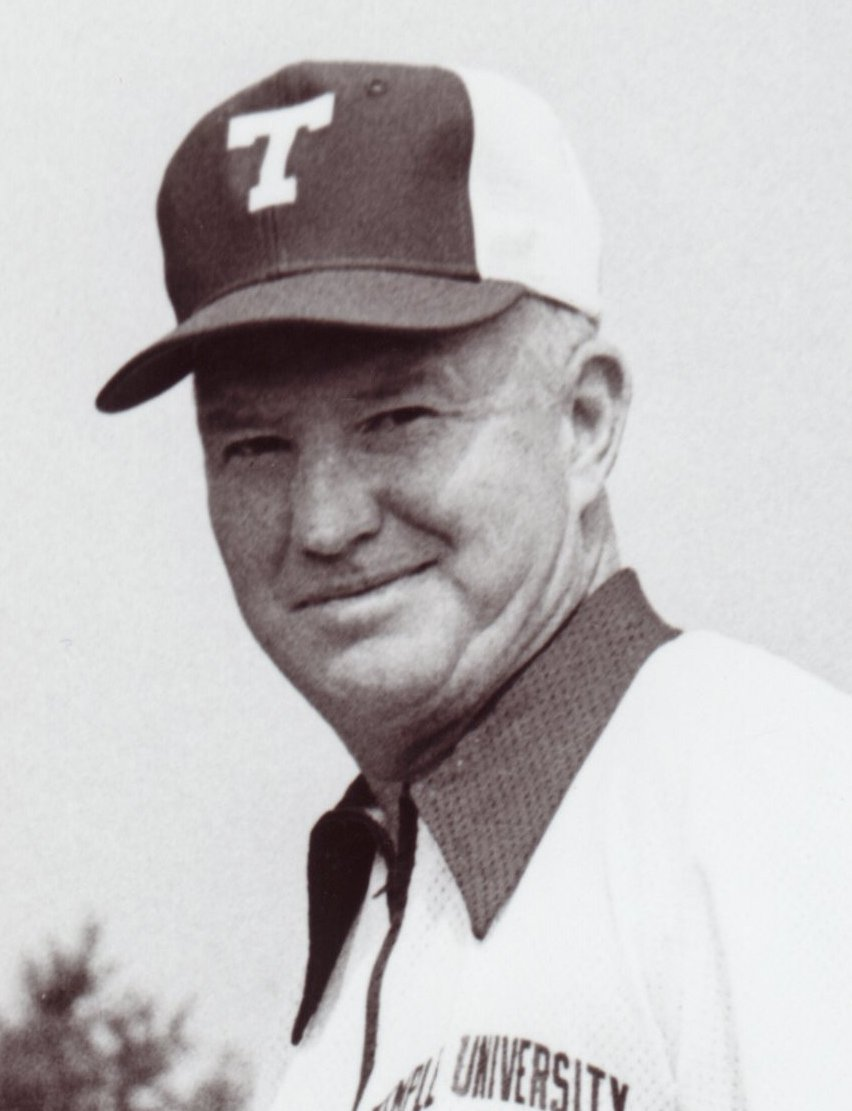
Wayne Hardin coaching with Temple in the 1970s

After the 1969 season, the Owls became an independent again to upgrade their schedule and compete against the top teams in the East. Under new coach Wayne Hardin, who coached six years at Navy, Temple was up to the challenge. Temple went 9–1 in 1973 and 8–2 in 1974 and won 14 straight games at one point. Temple played regular season games in Japan's Mirage Bowl twice, losing 35–32 to Grambling State in 1977 and beating Boston College 28–24 in 1978.

In 1979, the Owls had a 10–2 record and the most wins in school history. The Owls opened the season with a 38–16 win at West Virginia and later beat Rutgers (41–20) and Syracuse (49–17). Temple's only losses during the regular season were to nationally ranked Pittsburgh (10–9) and Penn State (22–7). In the game at Penn State, before a record-setting crowd, the Owls led 7–6 at the half. Following the 1979 season, the Owls defeated California 28–17 in the second Garden State Bowl. The crowd who witnessed Temple beat California (55,952) was the largest in the short history of that bowl.

Hardin led the Owls to an 80–52–3 record over 12 years. Under Hardin, the Owls were one of the more stable Eastern football powers and often defeated local rivals West Virginia, Rutgers and Syracuse. In the 1970s, Temple went 4–4 against West Virginia, 2–1 against Rutgers, 1–1 against Syracuse, 4–1–1 against Cincinnati and 2–0 against Connecticut. They also came the closest to beating Penn State since the 1940s, losing by one point in both 1975 and 1967.

=== Bruce Arians era (1983–1988) ===
When Hardin retired in 1982, the Owls hired Bruce Arians, who was then 30 years old, to succeed him. The previous season, Arians worked under Alabama coaching legend Paul "Bear" Bryant as running backs coach. At Temple, Arians had some success, beating Pitt three times in his six years on the job. Arians had two winning seasons, going 6–5 in 1984 when the defense was ranked 21st in the nation beating East Carolina, Pitt, and West Virginia. The Owls also went 6–5 in 1986. Unfortunately, Temple's six wins in 1986 were later forfeited after it emerged that star running back Paul Palmer had signed with an agent during his senior season.

=== Decline (1989–2005) ===
Jerry Berndt, who took over for Arians in 1989, led Temple to their last winning season for almost twenty years in 1990, when the Owls went 7–4. Temple joined the Big East Conference in 1991, but had difficulty competing against teams with better facilities and bigger budgets. The Owls would not win a conference game until 1995. In 1998, the Owls upset the No. 14 Virginia Tech Hokies as 36-point underdogs in their first-ever Big East road win and their first victory over a ranked opponent in 11 years. In that game, which stands as one of the largest upsets in college football history, Temple utilized their third-string quarterback and had 10 players making their first starts of the season due to injuries. However, Temple would only win 16 conference games during their 14-year run in the league. Temple won as many as three league games only once (1997: 3–8, 3–4 Big East) and went winless in league play six times. Overall, they had a 14–80 record against Big East foes during their time in the conference.

Berndt (11–33), Ron Dickerson (1993–97: 8–47) and Bobby Wallace (1998–2005: 19–71) were unable to halt the decline. Temple went 0–11 in Wallace's final year. The Big East voted in February 2001 to expel Temple from the conference effective June 30, 2002. Conference officials said that since at least 1996, Temple had been out of compliance with Big East membership standards including competitiveness, attendance, and facilities. On September 7, 2001, the Big East and Temple reached an agreement for Temple to remain through the 2004 season.

=== Al Golden era (2006–2010) ===
Virginia defensive coordinator Al Golden was named head coach ahead of the 2006 season. The Owls lost their first 8 games under Golden before beating Bowling Green during their Homecoming game on October 28, snapping a 20-game losing streak, one game short of the school record. The Owls finished 1–11 in Golden's first year.

The Owls won 4 games in 2007, including three straight wins at one point in mid-season. During Golden's second season, Temple's defense was ranked 49th in the nation, as opposed to 118th in 2006. The offense also improved from 118th to 113th, but it was clear that Temple's defense, despite their incredible youth, was the heart of their team. The Owls won 5 games in 2008, their most since 1990. After his fourth season, Golden's record stood at 19–29.

==== 2009 ====
In 2009, the Owls went 9–4, their best record since 1979 with three of four losses being competitive including a last-second loss to eventual FCS national champion Villanova. The lone exception was a lopsided 31–6 loss to a Penn State team that finished 11–2 with a No. 8 ranking. Temple accepted a bid to play in the EagleBank Bowl, where they faced UCLA. In the Owls' first post-season appearance since the 1979 Garden State Bowl, the Owls lost 30–21 to the Bruins.

==== 2010 ====
In 2010, the Owls lost a crucial game to Ohio which would have clinched them a MAC Championship berth. The week after, Temple added another loss to Miami (Ohio), and coupled with losses to Penn State and Northern Illinois, the Owls finished at 8–4 for the season but did not receive a bowl bid.

In December 2010, Golden was hired as the head coach of the University of Miami Hurricanes.

=== Steve Addazio era (2011–2012) ===
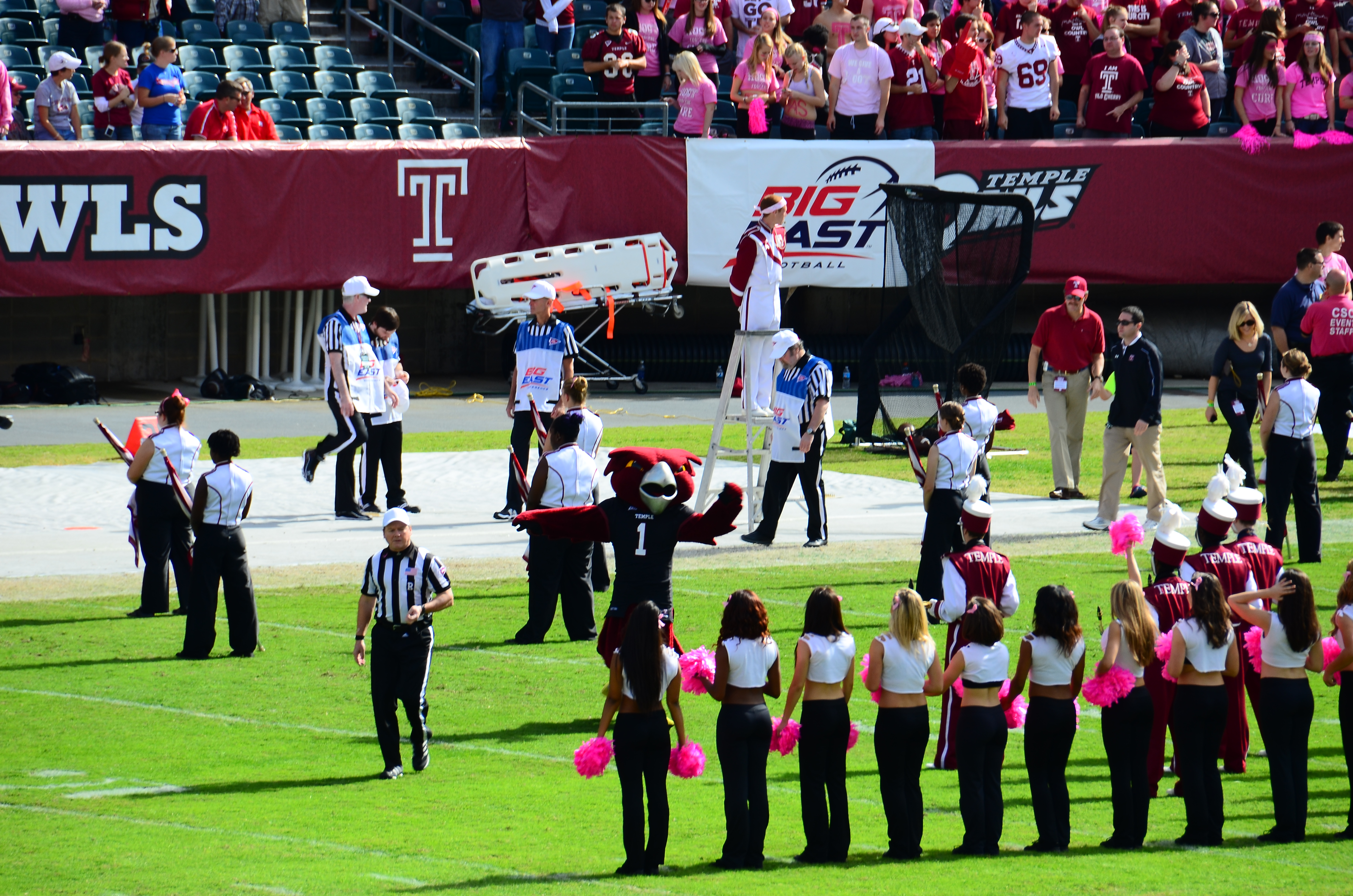
The Temple Owl pregame in 2012

Steve Addazio coached the Owls from 2011 to 2012 before becoming the Boston College head coach. During the 2011 season, the Owls reached their fourth bowl game ever after posting a 9–4 record. In a dominating win over Wyoming, the Owls secured their second bowl win in team history and the first since the 1970s. The following season, Temple went 4–7 in its first season back in the Big East. Following the season, Addazio left Temple to become the head coach at Boston College.

=== Matt Rhule era (2013–2016) ===
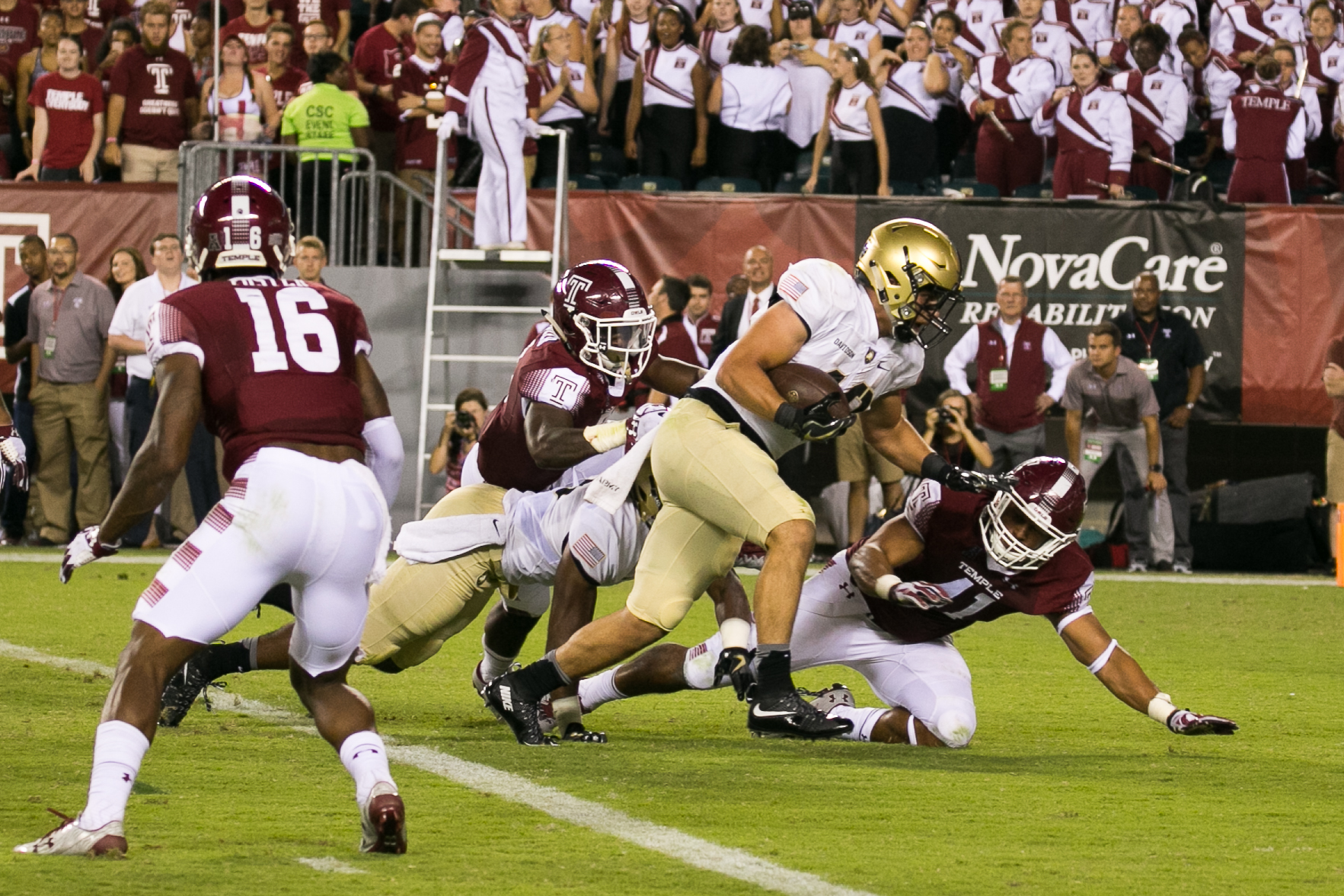
Temple playing Army in 2016

Matt Rhule, who had previously served as a Temple assistant coach from 2006 to 2011, was named Temple's head coach in December 2012. Rhule was previously serving as the Assistant Offensive Line Coach for the NFL's New York Giants. Rhule beat out his former colleague, University of Miami defensive coordinator Mark D'Onofrio for the job.

In Rhule's first season as head coach, Temple struggled and won just two games. Despite the record, however, Rhule and his staff assembled the No. 2 recruiting class in the American Athletic Conference for the Class of 2014.

==== 2014 ====
During Rhule's second year as head coach, Temple showed considerable improvement over its previous season record. Temple defeated Vanderbilt, 37–7, in its opening game for the program's first win over an SEC opponent since 1938. Later in the season, Temple upset the No. 21 East Carolina for its first win over a nationally ranked opponent since 1998. Overall, the 2014 Temple Owls football team finished at a bowl-eligible mark of 6–6 but did not secure a bowl bid. Rhule's contract was extended until the 2019–20 season in July 2015.

==== 2015 ====
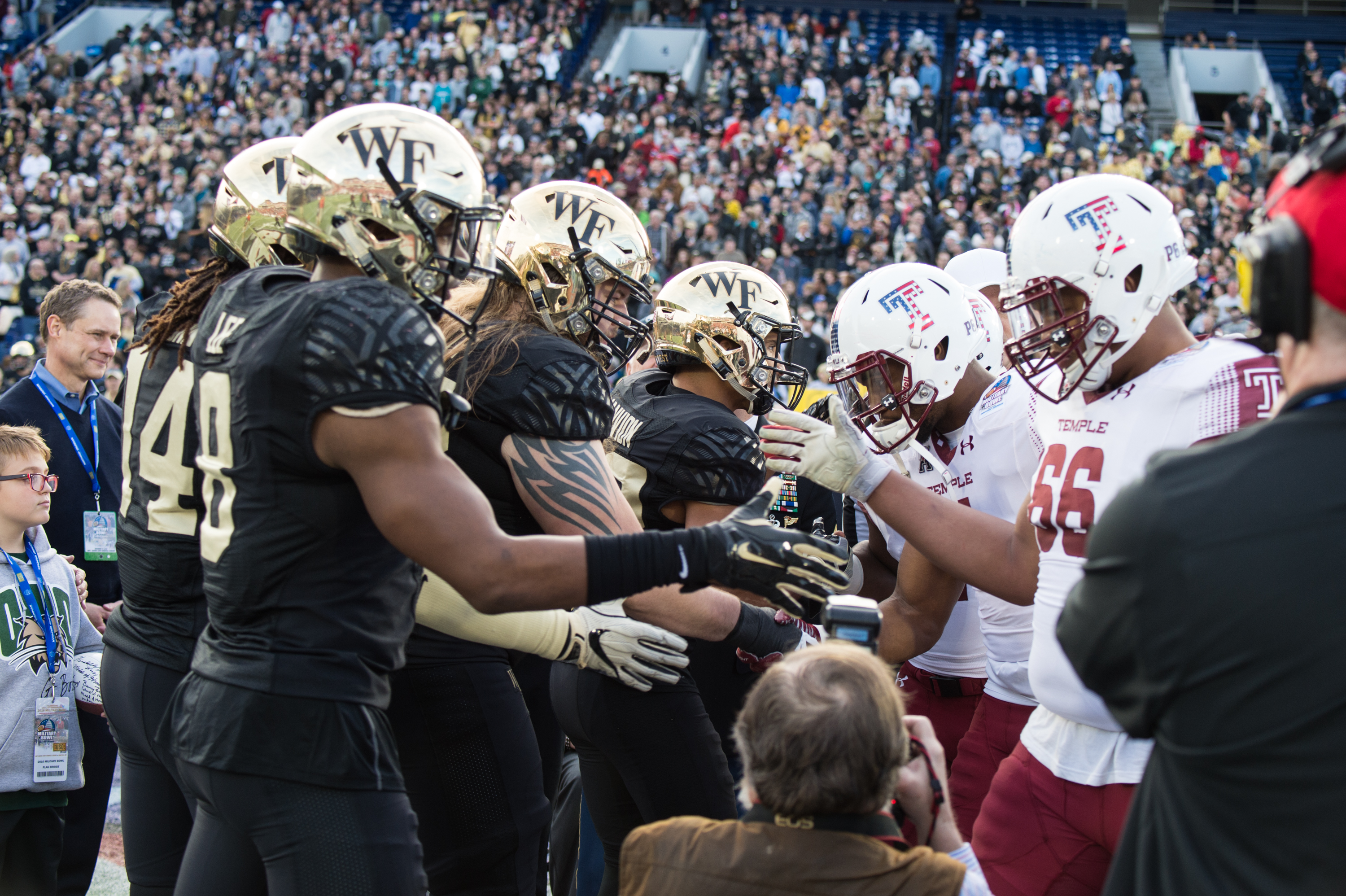
Temple and Wake Forest players shake hands prior to the 2016 Military Bowl

Rhule began the 2015 season by beating Penn State, his own alma mater, 27–10 in front of a sellout crowd of 69,176 – a record for a college football game at Lincoln Financial Field. The win against Penn State was the school's first since 1941. The Owls also set an American Athletic Conference record for sacks in a game by recording 10 against highly touted NFL prospect Christian Hackenberg. One of the 10 sacks came on a two-man rush against Penn State's offensive line and was featured on ESPN's "Not Top 10." The Owls followed up their historic win by going on the road and knocking off American Athletic Conference preseason favorite Cincinnati 34–26.

The Owls continued their hot start with a close 25–23 win at Massachusetts. After a bye week, Temple traveled to Charlotte and stomped the 49ers by a score of 37–3. Robby Anderson caught 2 touchdowns and Nate L Smith recovered a blocked punt for a touchdown in the win that sent Temple to its first 4–0 start since 1974.

Temple beat Tulane 49–10 in week 5, followed by a 30–16 win at home against UCF. Playing in a sold out Dowdy–Ficklen Stadium, Temple won a harrowing victory in a nationally televised game against East Carolina, marking the program's first 7–0 start since its inception in 1894. Temple was in the national spotlight as ESPN's College GameDay took place at Temple for the first time in school history. The No. 21 Owls later that night took on No. 9 Notre Dame in primetime on ABC. The game was widely considered to be the program's biggest game since the 1935 Sugar Bowl. Despite the Owl's leading 20–17 with 2:30 left in the fourth quarter, the Fighting Irish rallied with a late touchdown to beat Temple 24–20, ending Temple's unbeaten start.

Temple followed up the nationally significant game vs Notre Dame with a win vs SMU, an away loss to USF and wins in both remaining home games vs No. 21 Memphis and UConn. Finishing 10–2 in the regular season for only the second time in school history, the Owls clinched a berth in the inaugural AAC Championship vs the Houston Cougars, where they lost 24–13. They ended the season with a 32–17 loss against the Toledo Rockets in the Boca Raton Bowl.

==== 2016 ====
Rhule led the Owls' 2016 campaign to a 10–3 overall (7–1 AAC) record and another AAC East title, becoming the first team in league history to repeat as division champions. In the 2016 American Athletic Conference Football Championship Game, the Owls beat the No. 19 Navy Midshipmen 34–10 to win their first major conference title and first conference title since the 1967 Middle Atlantic Conference title. The Owls lost to Wake Forest in the 2016 Military Bowl in Annapolis, Maryland.

After two seasons with 10 wins, on December 6, it was announced that Rhule was named the new coach of the Baylor Bears. Ed Foley served as the interim coach for the 2016 Military Bowl.

=== Geoff Collins era (2017–2018) ===
On December 16, 2016, Geoff Collins was named as Matt Rhule's replacement. Collins had spent the last two years as the defensive coordinator at Florida. In Collins' first year, Temple went 7–6 and won the 2017 Gasparilla Bowl. The bowl win was Temple's first since 2011 and just its third bowl win ever. During the 2018 season, Collins' Temple team started off 0–2 with losses to FCS Villanova and Buffalo but rallied to finish the season 8–4 and qualify for the 2018 Independence Bowl vs Duke. By doing so, Temple reached bowl eligibility for the fifth straight year and went to a bowl for the fourth straight year, both program records. On December 7, 2018, Collins accepted the head coaching position at Georgia Tech, leaving the Owls just 2 years into his tenure on North Broad.

On December 13, Temple named Miami defensive coordinator Manny Diaz as its new head coach; however, on December 30, Diaz left to return to Miami as head coach.

=== Rod Carey era (2019–2021) ===
On January 10, 2019, it was announced that Northern Illinois coach Rod Carey would replace Collins. That season, The Owls recorded two wins against AP Poll ranked teams, a program record. The Owls ended the season with a loss to North Carolina in the 2019 Military Bowl, finishing with an 8–5 record. The 2020 season was reduced due to the COVID-19 pandemic, resulting in a delayed start to the season and only 7 games played. The team finished with a 1–6 record, their first losing season since 2013. Carey was fired after a disappointing 2021 season where finished with a record of 3–9 and lost every one of their final seven games by at least 20 points. Carey also faced accusations of losing support in the Temple locker room after multiple players including the team's starting quarterback and number one wide receiver entered the transfer portal.

=== Stan Drayton era (2022–2024) ===
On December 15, 2021, Texas associate head coach and running back coach Stan Drayton was announced to replace Carey as the next head football coach of the Owls. In Drayton's first season, Temple struggled and went 3–9. Drayton was fired in 2024. He finished his Temple tenure with a record of 9–25.

=== K.C. Keeler era (2025–present) ===
On December 1, 2024, Sam Houston head coach K. C. Keeler was hired to replace Drayton as the 34th Owls head football coach.

== Conference affiliations ==
Temple has been a both an independent and affiliated with multiple conferences.

- Independent (1894–1957)
- Middle Atlantic Conference (1958–1969)
- Independent (1970–1990)
- Big East Conference (1991–2004)
- Independent (2005–2006)
- Mid-American Conference (2007–2011)
- Big East Conference (2012)
- American Conference (2013–present)

== Championships ==
=== Conference championships ===
Year	Coach	Conference	Record	Conference Record
1967	George Makris	Middle Atlantic Conference	7–2	4–0
2016	Matt Rhule	American Athletic Conference	10–4	7–1

=== Division championships ===
Year	Division	Coach	Opponent	CG result
2009†	MAC East	Al Golden	N/A lost tie-breaker to Ohio	
2015†	AAC East	Matt Rhule	Houston	L 13–24
2016†	AAC East	Matt Rhule	Navy	W 34–10

† Co-champions

== Bowl games ==
The Owls have played in nine bowl games, and they have a 3–6 record.

Year	Coach	Bowl	Opponent	Result
1934	Pop Warner	Sugar Bowl	Tulane	L 14–20
1979	Wayne Hardin	Garden State Bowl	California	W 28–17
2009	Al Golden	EagleBank Bowl	UCLA	L 21–30
2011	Steve Addazio	New Mexico Bowl	Wyoming	W 37–15
2015	Matt Rhule	Boca Raton Bowl	Toledo	L 17–32
2016	Ed Foley	Military Bowl	Wake Forest	L 26–34
2017	Geoff Collins	Gasparilla Bowl	FIU	W 28–3
2018	Ed Foley	Independence Bowl	Duke	L 27–56
2019	Rod Carey	Military Bowl	North Carolina	L 13–55

== Head coaches ==
There have been 29 head coaches in Temple's history.

No.	Coach	Tenure	Record	Pct.
1	Charles M. Williams	1894–1898	13–15–1	.466
2	John T. Rogers	1899–1900	4–8–2	.357
3	Harry Shindle Wingert	1901–1905	13–9–2	.583
	No team	1906		
4	Horace Butterworth	1907	4–0–2	.833
5	Frank W. White	1908	3–2–1	.583
6	William J. Schatz	1909–1913	13–14–3	.483
7	William Nicolai	1914–1916	9–5–3	.618
8	Elwood Geiges	1917	0–6–1	.071
	No team	1918–1921		
9	M. Francois D'Eliscu	1922–1923	1–9–1	.136
10	Albert Barron	1924	1–4	.200
11	Heinie Miller	1925–1932	50–15–8	.740
12	Pop Warner	1933–1938	31–18–9	.612
13	Fred H. Swan	1939	2–7	.222
14	Ray Morrison	1940–1948	31–8–9	.740
15	Albert Kawal	1949–1954	17–19–2	.474
16	Josh Cody	1955	0–8	.000
17	Peter P. Stevens	1956–1959	4–28	.125
18	George Makris	1960–1969	45–44–4	.505
19	Wayne Hardin	1970–1982	73–49–3	.596
20	Bruce Arians	1983–1988	27–39	.409
21	Jerry Berndt	1989–1992	11–33	.250
22	Ron Dickerson	1993–1997	8–47	.145
23	Bobby Wallace	1998–2005	19–71	.211
24	Al Golden	2006–2010	27–34	.443
25	Steve Addazio	2011–2012	13–11	.542
26	Matt Rhule	2013–2016	28–23	.549
27	Ed Foley¹	2016	0–1	.000
28	Geoff Collins	2017–2018	15–10	.600
29	Ed Foley¹	2018	0–1	.000
30	Manny Diaz²	2019	0–0	–
31	Rod Carey	2019–2021	12–20	.375
32	Stan Drayton	2022–2024	9–25	.265
33	Everett Withers³	2024	0–2	.000
34	K. C. Keeler	2025–present	5–7	.417

¹ Foley has twice been interim head coach

² Diaz left Temple for Miami before ever coaching a game

³ Everett Withers was named interim coach after the firing of Stan Drayton.

== Rivalries ==
=== Penn State ===
Temple and the Penn State Nittany Lions have played 45 times. Temple won three out of the first four matchups, which were held between 1931 and 1941. Penn State's 31 game winning streak, between 1952 and 2016, carried the Nittany Lions to an overwhelming series lead. Penn State leads the series 40–4-1 through the 2016 season. The two teams will have a home and home series in 2026 and 2027.

=== Villanova ===
The series with Villanova dates to 1928. The series is tied at 16–16–1 through the 2018 season.

=== Rutgers ===
Temple and Rutgers have played 38 times. Rutgers lead 23–16.

== Hall of Fame ==
=== College Football Hall of Fame ===
Temple claims four members of the College Football Hall of Fame.

Name	Position	Years	Inducted	Ref.
Pop Warner	Coach	1933–1938	1951	
Ray Morrison	Coach	1940–1948	1954	
Wayne Hardin	Coach	1970–1982	2013	
Paul Palmer	RB	1983–1986	2018	

=== Pro Football Hall of Fame ===
Name	Position	NFL team(s)	Inducted	Ref.
Joe Klecko	DT	New York Jets	2023	

== Individual awards ==
=== National awards ===
- Maxwell Award
  - Steve Joachim – 1974
- Chuck Bednarik Award
  - Tyler Matakevich – 2015
- Bronko Nagurski Trophy
  - Tyler Matakevich – 2015

=== Conference awards ===
==== Big East Conference ====
- Big East Conference Defensive Player of the Year
  - Dan Klecko – 2002
- Big East Conference Freshman of the Year
  - Tyler Matakevich – 2012
- Big East Conference Special Teams Player of the Year
  - Matt Brown – 2012

==== Mid-American Conference ====
- MAC Coach of the Year
  - Al Golden – 2009
- MAC Freshman of the Year
  - Bernard Pierce – 2009
- MAC Defensive Player of the Year
  - Adrian Robinson - 2009

==== American Athletic Conference ====
- American Athletic Conference Defensive Player of the Year
  - Tyler Matakevich – 2015
  - Quincy Roche - 2019
- American Athletic Conference Special Teams Player of the Year
  - Isaiah Wright – 2018
- American Athletic Conference Rookie of the Year
  - E.J. Warner – 2022

== Consensus All-Americans ==
- John Rienstra – 1985
- Paul Palmer – 1986
- Tyler Matakevich – 2015

== Owls in the NFL ==
First round draft picks

Name	Position	Year	Overall pick	Team
John Rienstra	G	1986	9	Pittsburgh Steelers
Paul Palmer	RB	1987	19	Kansas City Chiefs
Muhammad Wilkerson	DT	2011	30	New York Jets
Haason Reddick	LB	2017	13	Arizona Cardinals

=== Active NFL ===
As of April 2026

- Dion Dawkins, Buffalo Bills
- Sam Franklin Jr., Buffalo Bills
- Maddux Trujillo, Buffalo Bills
- Matt Hennessy, Dallas Cowboys
- Michael Niese, Detroit Lions
- Rock Ya-Sin, Detroit Lions
- Brandon McManus, Green Bay Packers
- Cam'Ron Stewart, Minnesota Vikings
- Haason Reddick, Minnesota Vikings
- Jacob Martin, Tennessee Titans
- David Martin-Robinson, Tennessee Titans
- Jordan Magee, Washington Commanders

== Home stadium ==
When Temple first began its football program, the team had no official home field, eventually settling into Vernon Park in Germantown. From 1928 until 1977, the Owls played at Temple Stadium, also referred to as Owl Stadium and Beury Stadium. Temple Stadium encompassed 32 acres of land in the West Oak Lane neighborhood in North Philadelphia, with a capacity of nearly 20,000 people. In 1978, the team moved to Veterans Stadium. During the 1986 season, the Owls averaged an all-time high of 34,543 fans to their games at Veterans Stadium and their games, regularly televised, did well in the local Nielsen ratings. While at Veterans Stadium, the Philadelphia Phillies had priority for the field for Saturdays during baseball season. When Temple home games conflicted with Phillies home games, Temple would play at Franklin Field. Veterans Stadium remained their home field through the 2002 season. Lincoln Financial Field has been Temple's home field since 2003, with the first home game being the inaugural college game at Lincoln Financial Field between Temple and Villanova, which drew over 30,000 fans.

The most attended Temple game, with 105,950 attendees, occurred November 11, 2006, at Beaver Stadium, home of Penn State. Temple lost that game 47–0. Nine out of the ten most attended Temple games occurred at Penn State.

The largest attended home game was October 31, 2015, at Lincoln Financial Field, when the Owls played host to the Notre Dame Fighting Irish, which had an announced attendance of 69,280, while the actual attendance was north of 70,000. Temple lost the game 24–20. The 2015 season marked the first time two Temple home games (the season-opener against Penn State and the ABC primetime game against Notre Dame) sold out at Lincoln Financial Field since the team moved there in 2003.

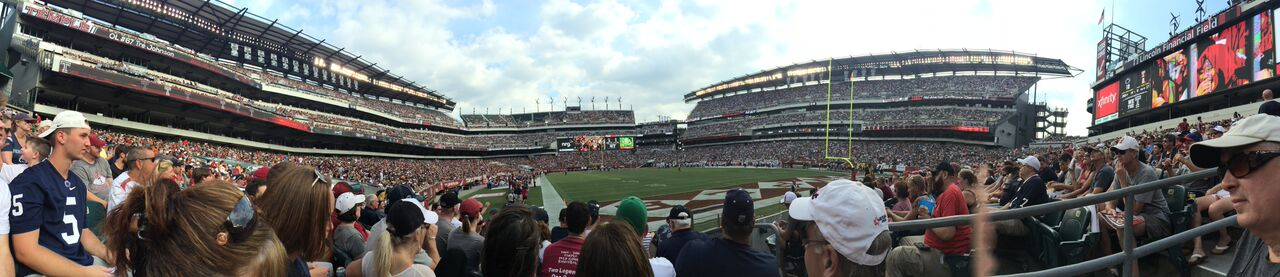
Temple's home stadium since 2003, Lincoln Financial Field, on September 5, 2015, the first time Temple beat Penn State since 1941. In front of 69,174 fans, Matt Rhule's Owls beat James Franklin's Lions 27–10.

== Media coverage ==
Eight Temple games were broadcast over Philadelphia television in 2005, the most in school history at the time. At one point, Owls football games aired on 12 stations from as far north as Sayre, Pennsylvania, to as far south as Baltimore. After that, games aired on only one station, WPHT 1210 (AM) in Philadelphia. Harry Donahue handled the play-by-play with former Temple Owl Steve Joachim doing the color. WHAT 1340 AM airs games in Spanish. Past play-by-play broadcasters have included Dave Sims, who covers college football and basketball for ESPN; Ron Menchine, the former Navy play-by-play announcer and Howie Herman, a sports columnist in Massachusetts.

Since rejoining the Big East Conference in 2012, and remaining in the conference when it became the American Athletic Conference, every Temple game has appeared on television. Radio-wise, the games are broadcast on WPEN 97.5 The Fanatic. Harry Donahue continues to handle the play-by-play while former Heisman Trophy runner-up and Temple running back Paul Palmer handles the color commentary. Harry Mayes is the sideline reporter.

Temple football is covered by a number of outlets, including the student newspaper, The Temple News; traditional newspapers such as The Philadelphia Inquirer and the Philadelphia Daily News; and online outlets such as NBC Sports Philadelphia, OwlScoop.com, and OwlsDaily.com. On October 31, 2015, ESPN College GameDay came to Philadelphia for the first time since 2002, and the first time for the Owls Football team, as they were hosting the Saturday Night Football primetime game on ABC against Notre Dame. It was the first time that a Temple football game had been featured on the program.

== In the polls ==
Temple first entered the AP poll in 1936, its first year of existence, at No. 19 after week 4. It dropped to No. 20 the subsequent week, and fell out of the poll after week 6. In 1941, Temple was again ranked in the AP poll for two weeks; No. 17 after week 2 following a 14–0 win against Penn State (their last win against the Nittany Lions for 74 years), and No. 13 after a 41–14 win over the Bucknell Bison. As of 2015, this was their highest AP ranking ever. They fell out of the AP poll after week 5. The Owls would not return to the AP poll until 1974, when they were ranked No. 19 for one week.

During the 1979 season, Temple entered the AP poll at No. 18 after week 10 following a home win against the Akron Zips. They fell out of the poll the next week but returned after week 13, and finished the season ranked No. 17 in both the Coaches and AP polls.

During the 2009 season, Temple received votes in the AP poll for four weeks and the Coaches poll for two, but did not reach the top 25 in either poll. They received votes in the AP poll for four weeks and the Coaches poll for eight during the 2010 season, including the preseason, but remained unranked. During the 2011 season, the Owls received votes in the Coaches poll for three weeks and received votes for the 2014 season preseason for the same poll.

Temple finally gained poll exposure during the breakthrough 2015 season. the Owls were ranked for six out of 14 weeks in the AP & Coaches polls, and received votes during six other weeks. Those weeks were the university's first national rankings since 1979. Also in 2015, Temple was ranked in the College Football Playoff rankings, marking the first time any Pennsylvania collegiate team was ranked by the College Football Playoff selection committee. The Owls were ranked No. 22 in consecutive weeks during which their record was 7–1 and 8–1. Temple was ranked No. 24 in the final regular season CFP rankings.

After reeling off seven straight wins to end the 2016 regular season including a win over No. 19 Navy in the American championship game, the Owls were ranked No. 23 in the AP Poll and No. 24 in the Coaches and final College Football Playoff rankings. This marked the second straight year that the Owls were ranked in the final CFP rankings, at No. 24 in both 2015 and 2016.

In 2019, Temple received votes in the AP poll for two weeks following home ranked wins against #21 Maryland and #23 Memphis making this the first season in school history with multiple ranked wins. The Owls also received votes in the Coaches Poll for six weeks and were ranked #25 for one following their win against Memphis. The Owls would fail to receive AP votes the following weeks after road losses to unranked Buffalo and #19 SMU.

== Future non-conference opponents ==
Announced schedules as of January 5, 2026.

2026	2027	2028	2029	2030	2031	2032	2033
Rhode Island	UMass	at Oklahoma	at Miami (FL)	Rutgers	at Rutgers	at Delaware	Delaware
Penn State	at UConn	Duke	at UMass			Rutgers	at Rutgers
at Toledo	at Penn State	at Utah State				Toledo	
UConn		UConn					
