= 1912 college football rankings =

- Season: 1912
- Bowl season: 1912–13 bowl games
- End of season champions: Harvard

The 1912 college football season rankings included a championship selection by The New York Times.

== The New York Times ==
In December 1912, The New York Times listed Harvard as football's "Champion College Team" in an end-of-year listing of champions in all sports.

Rank	Team	Record
1	Harvard	9–0

== See also ==
- 1912 College Football All-America Team
