= 1912 Cornell Big Red football team =

American college football season

1912 Cornell Big Red football
- Conference: Independent
- Record: 3–7
- Head coach: Albert Sharpe (1st season)
- Captain: E. W. Butler
- Home stadium: Percy Field

1912 Eastern college football independents records
	Conf.			Overall
Team	W	L	T	W		L		T
Harvard		–		9	–	0	–	0
Penn State		–		8	–	0	–	0
Carlisle		–		12	–	1	–	1
Princeton		–		7	–	1	–	1
Swarthmore		–		7	–	1	–	1
Yale		–		7	–	1	–	1
Lehigh		–		9	–	2	–	0
Dartmouth		–		7	–	2	–	0
Wesleyan		–		7	–	2	–	0
Colgate		–		5	–	2	–	0
Washington & Jefferson		–		8	–	3	–	1
Rhode Island State		–		6	–	3	–	0
Bucknell		–		6	–	3	–	1
Temple		–		3	–	2	–	0
Penn		–		7	–	4	–	0
Army		–		5	–	3	–	0
Brown		–		6	–	4	–	0
Franklin & Marshall		–		6	–	4	–	0
Holy Cross		–		4	–	3	–	1
Rutgers		–		5	–	4	–	0
Tufts		–		5	–	4	–	0
Fordham		–		4	–	4	–	0
Villanova		–		3	–	3	–	0
Lafayette		–		4	–	5	–	1
Syracuse		–		4	–	5	–	0
Carnegie Tech		–		3	–	4	–	1
New Hampshire		–		3	–	4	–	1
Geneva		–		3	–	4	–	0
Vermont		–		3	–	5	–	0
Pittsburgh		–		3	–	6	–	0
Boston College		–		2	–	4	–	1
Cornell		–		3	–	7	–	0
NYU		–		2	–	6	–	0

The 1912 Cornell Big Red football team was an American football team that represented Cornell University during the 1912 college football season. In their first season under head coach Albert Sharpe, the Big Red compiled a 3–7 record and were outscored by their opponents by a combined total of 136 to 63. No Cornell players received honors on Walter Camp's 1912 College Football All-America Team. However, three Cornell players received All-American honors from others: end John E. O'Hearn (second-team, The Philadelphia Inquirer); guard Jimmie Munns (second-team, The New York Sun); and end Harold R. Eyrick (third-team, The Philadelphia Press).

== Schedule ==
Date	Opponent	Site	Result	Source
September 21	Washington & Jefferson	Percy Field; Ithaca, NY	W 3–0	
September 28	Colgate	Percy Field; Ithaca, NY (rivalry)	L 7–13	
October 5	Oberlin	Percy Field; Ithaca, NY	L 0–13	
October 12	NYU	Percy Field; Ithaca, NY	W 14–6	
October 19	Penn State	Percy Field; Ithaca, NY	L 6–29	
October 26	Bucknell	Percy Field; Ithaca, NY	W 14–0	
November 2	Williams	Percy Field; Ithaca, NY	L 10–24	
November 9	Dartmouth	Percy Field; Ithaca, NY (rivalry)	L 0–24	
November 16	at Michigan	Ferry Field; Ann Arbor, MI	L 7–20	
November 28	at Penn	Franklin Field; Philadelphia, PA (rivalry)	L 2–7	
