= 1912 Dartmouth football team =

American college football season

1912 Dartmouth football
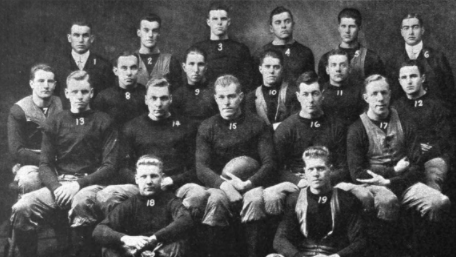
- Conference: Independent
- Record: 7–2
- Head coach: Frank Cavanaugh (2nd season)
- Captain: Ray Bennett

1912 Eastern college football independents records
	Conf.			Overall
Team	W	L	T	W		L		T
Harvard		–		9	–	0	–	0
Penn State		–		8	–	0	–	0
Carlisle		–		12	–	1	–	1
Princeton		–		7	–	1	–	1
Swarthmore		–		7	–	1	–	1
Yale		–		7	–	1	–	1
Lehigh		–		9	–	2	–	0
Dartmouth		–		7	–	2	–	0
Wesleyan		–		7	–	2	–	0
Colgate		–		5	–	2	–	0
Washington & Jefferson		–		8	–	3	–	1
Rhode Island State		–		6	–	3	–	0
Bucknell		–		6	–	3	–	1
Temple		–		3	–	2	–	0
Penn		–		7	–	4	–	0
Army		–		5	–	3	–	0
Brown		–		6	–	4	–	0
Franklin & Marshall		–		6	–	4	–	0
Holy Cross		–		4	–	3	–	1
Rutgers		–		5	–	4	–	0
Tufts		–		5	–	4	–	0
Fordham		–		4	–	4	–	0
Villanova		–		3	–	3	–	0
Lafayette		–		4	–	5	–	1
Syracuse		–		4	–	5	–	0
Carnegie Tech		–		3	–	4	–	1
New Hampshire		–		3	–	4	–	1
Geneva		–		3	–	4	–	0
Vermont		–		3	–	5	–	0
Pittsburgh		–		3	–	6	–	0
Boston College		–		2	–	4	–	1
Cornell		–		3	–	7	–	0
NYU		–		2	–	6	–	0

The 1912 Dartmouth football team was an American football team that represented Dartmouth College as an independent during the 1912 college football season. In its second season under head coach Frank Cavanaugh, the team compiled a 7–2 record, shut out six of nine opponents, and outscored all opponents by a total of 281 to 34. Frederick E. Jennings was hired as the assistant coach for the season. Ray Bennett was the team captain.

Tackle Wesley Englehorn was a consensus first-team pick on the 1912 All-America college football team.

== Schedule ==
Date	Opponent	Site	Result	Attendance	Source
September 21	Bates	Hanover, NH	W 26–0		
September 28	Norwich	Hanover, NH	W 41–9		
October 5	Massachusetts	Hanover, NH	W 47–0		
October 12	Vermont	Hanover, NH	W 55–0		
October 19	at Williams	Williamstown, MA	W 21–0		
October 26	at Princeton	Palmer Stadium; Princeton, NJ	L 7–22		
November 2	Amherst	Hanover, NH	W 60–0		
November 9	at Cornell	Percy Field; Ithaca, NY (rivalry)	W 24–0		
November 16	at Harvard	Harvard Stadium; Boston, MA (rivalry)	L 0–3	40,000	
