= 1912 Fordham Maroon football team =

American college football season

1912 Fordham Maroon football
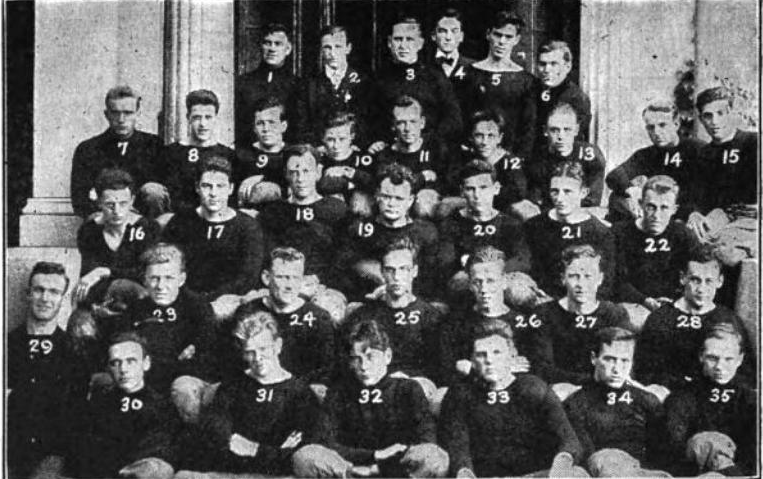
- Head coach Thorp #3
- Conference: Independent
- Record: 17–5 / 4–4
- Head coach: Tom Thorp (1st season)
- Captain: James Hinchcliffe
- Home stadium: Fordham Field

1912 Eastern college football independents records
	Conf.			Overall
Team	W	L	T	W		L		T
Harvard		–		9	–	0	–	0
Penn State		–		8	–	0	–	0
Carlisle		–		12	–	1	–	1
Princeton		–		7	–	1	–	1
Swarthmore		–		7	–	1	–	1
Yale		–		7	–	1	–	1
Lehigh		–		9	–	2	–	0
Dartmouth		–		7	–	2	–	0
Wesleyan		–		7	–	2	–	0
Colgate		–		5	–	2	–	0
Washington & Jefferson		–		8	–	3	–	1
Rhode Island State		–		6	–	3	–	0
Bucknell		–		6	–	3	–	1
Temple		–		3	–	2	–	0
Penn		–		7	–	4	–	0
Army		–		5	–	3	–	0
Brown		–		6	–	4	–	0
Franklin & Marshall		–		6	–	4	–	0
Holy Cross		–		4	–	3	–	1
Rutgers		–		5	–	4	–	0
Tufts		–		5	–	4	–	0
Fordham		–		4	–	4	–	0
Villanova		–		3	–	3	–	0
Lafayette		–		4	–	5	–	1
Syracuse		–		4	–	5	–	0
Carnegie Tech		–		3	–	4	–	1
New Hampshire		–		3	–	4	–	1
Vermont		–		3	–	5	–	0
Pittsburgh		–		3	–	6	–	0
Boston College		–		2	–	4	–	1
Cornell		–		3	–	7	–	0
NYU		–		2	–	6	–	0

The 1912 Fordham Maroon football team was an American football team that represented Fordham University as an independent during the 1912 college football season. In its first year under head coach Tom Thorp, Fordham claims a 17–5 record. College Football Data Warehouse (CFDW) lists the team's record at 4–4.

== Schedule ==
The following eight games are reported in Fordham's media guide, CFDW, and contemporaneous press coverage.

Date	Opponent	Site	Result	Source
October 5	Boston College	Fordham Field; Bronx, NY	W 14–0	
October 19	Rhode Island State	American League Park; New York, NY	L 0–6	
October 28	Norwich	Fordham Field; Bronx, NY	L 0–30	
November 5	Stevens	Fordham Field; Bronx, NY	W 13–12	
November 9	Albright	Fordham Field; Bronx, NY	W 13–6	
November 16	at Stevens	Castle Field; Hoboken, NJ	W 14–13	
November 23	at RPI	Troy, NY	L 3–13	
November 30	Villanova	Fordham Field; Bronx, NY	L 0–19	

The following are 14 additional games reported in the Fordham media guide.

Date	Opponent	Site	Result
	St. Peter's		W 1–0
	St. Bonaventure		W 1–0
	St. Bonaventure		W 12–0
	NYU		W 16–0
	NYU		W 26–12
	Fort Hancock		W 24–12
	Murray Hill Athletic Club		L 6–12
	Fort Wadsworth		W 17–7
	Fort Totten		W 13–0
	Bedford Athletic Club		W 16–10
	Commerce High School		W 45–0
	St. Peter's		W 25–12
	Rhode Island State		W 6–4
	Albright		W 18–0
