= 1912 NYU Violets football team =

American college football season

1912 NYU Violets football
- Conference: Independent
- Record: 2–6
- Head coach: Herman Olcott (6th season)
- Home stadium: Ohio Field

1912 Eastern college football independents records
	Conf.			Overall
Team	W	L	T	W		L		T
Harvard		–		9	–	0	–	0
Penn State		–		8	–	0	–	0
Carlisle		–		12	–	1	–	1
Princeton		–		7	–	1	–	1
Swarthmore		–		7	–	1	–	1
Yale		–		7	–	1	–	1
Lehigh		–		9	–	2	–	0
Dartmouth		–		7	–	2	–	0
Wesleyan		–		7	–	2	–	0
Colgate		–		5	–	2	–	0
Washington & Jefferson		–		8	–	3	–	1
Rhode Island State		–		6	–	3	–	0
Bucknell		–		6	–	3	–	1
Temple		–		3	–	2	–	0
Penn		–		7	–	4	–	0
Army		–		5	–	3	–	0
Brown		–		6	–	4	–	0
Franklin & Marshall		–		6	–	4	–	0
Holy Cross		–		4	–	3	–	1
Rutgers		–		5	–	4	–	0
Tufts		–		5	–	4	–	0
Fordham		–		4	–	4	–	0
Villanova		–		3	–	3	–	0
Lafayette		–		4	–	5	–	1
Syracuse		–		4	–	5	–	0
Carnegie Tech		–		3	–	4	–	1
New Hampshire		–		3	–	4	–	1
Geneva		–		3	–	4	–	0
Vermont		–		3	–	5	–	0
Pittsburgh		–		3	–	6	–	0
Boston College		–		2	–	4	–	1
Cornell		–		3	–	7	–	0
NYU		–		2	–	6	–	0

The 1912 NYU Violets football team was an American football team that represented New York University as an independent during the 1912 college football season. In their sixth year under head coach Herman Olcott, the team compiled a 2–6 record.

== Schedule ==
Date	Opponent	Site	Result	Source
October 5	Muhlenberg	Ohio Field; Bronx, NY	W 6–2	
October 12	at Cornell	Percy Field; Ithaca, NY	L 6–14	
October 19	Wesleyan	Ohio Field; Bronx, NY	L 0–26	
October 26	Williams	Ohio Field; Bronx, NY	L 6–16	
November 5	Trinity (CT)	Ohio Field; Bronx, NY	L 0–16	
November 9	at Princeton	University Field; Princeton, NJ	L 0–54	
November 16	Rhode Island State	Ohio Field; Bronx, NY	W 14–7	
November 23	at Navy	Worden Field; Annapolis, MD	L 0–39	
