= 1912 Colgate football team =

American college football season

1912 Colgate football
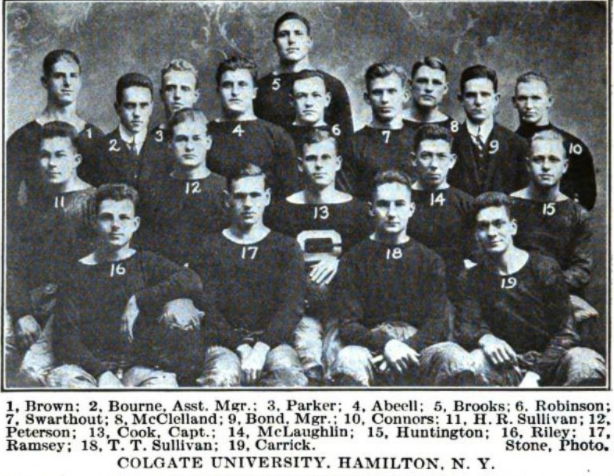
- Conference: Independent
- Record: 5–2
- Head coach: Dutch Sommer (1st season)
- Captain: Roscoe Cook
- Home stadium: Whitnall Field

1912 Eastern college football independents records
	Conf.			Overall
Team	W	L	T	W		L		T
Harvard		–		9	–	0	–	0
Penn State		–		8	–	0	–	0
Carlisle		–		12	–	1	–	1
Princeton		–		7	–	1	–	1
Swarthmore		–		7	–	1	–	1
Yale		–		7	–	1	–	1
Lehigh		–		9	–	2	–	0
Dartmouth		–		7	–	2	–	0
Wesleyan		–		7	–	2	–	0
Colgate		–		5	–	2	–	0
Washington & Jefferson		–		8	–	3	–	1
Rhode Island State		–		6	–	3	–	0
Bucknell		–		6	–	3	–	1
Temple		–		3	–	2	–	0
Penn		–		7	–	4	–	0
Army		–		5	–	3	–	0
Brown		–		6	–	4	–	0
Franklin & Marshall		–		6	–	4	–	0
Holy Cross		–		4	–	3	–	1
Rutgers		–		5	–	4	–	0
Tufts		–		5	–	4	–	0
Fordham		–		4	–	4	–	0
Villanova		–		3	–	3	–	0
Lafayette		–		4	–	5	–	1
Syracuse		–		4	–	5	–	0
Carnegie Tech		–		3	–	4	–	1
New Hampshire		–		3	–	4	–	1
Geneva		–		3	–	4	–	0
Vermont		–		3	–	5	–	0
Pittsburgh		–		3	–	6	–	0
Boston College		–		2	–	4	–	1
Cornell		–		3	–	7	–	0
NYU		–		2	–	6	–	0

The 1912 Colgate football team was an American football team that represented Colgate University as an independent during the 1912 college football season. In its first and only season under head coach Dutch Sommer, the team compiled a 5–2 record. Roscoe Cook was the team captain. The team played its home games on Whitnall Field in Hamilton, New York.

== Schedule ==
Date	Opponent	Site	Result	Source
September 28	at Cornell	Percy Field; Ithaca, NY (rivalry)	W 13–7	
October 5	at Amherst	Amherst, MA	L 0–13	
October 12	Hobart	Whitnall Field; Hamilton, NY	W 12–2	
October 19	at Trinity (CT)	Hartford, CT	W 24–7	
October 26	at Army	The Plain; West Point, NY	L 7–18	
November 9	Rochester	Whitnall Field; Hamilton, NY	W 27–0	
November 16	at Syracuse	Archbold Stadium; Syracuse, NY	W 7–0	
