= 1912 Holy Cross football team =

American college football season

1912 Holy Cross football
- Conference: Independent
- Record: 4–3–1
- Head coach: Timothy F. Larkin (6th season)
- Captain: Frederick V. Ostergren
- Home stadium: Fitton Field

1912 Eastern college football independents records
	Conf.			Overall
Team	W	L	T	W		L		T
Harvard		–		9	–	0	–	0
Penn State		–		8	–	0	–	0
Carlisle		–		12	–	1	–	1
Princeton		–		7	–	1	–	1
Swarthmore		–		7	–	1	–	1
Yale		–		7	–	1	–	1
Lehigh		–		9	–	2	–	0
Dartmouth		–		7	–	2	–	0
Wesleyan		–		7	–	2	–	0
Colgate		–		5	–	2	–	0
Washington & Jefferson		–		8	–	3	–	1
Rhode Island State		–		6	–	3	–	0
Bucknell		–		6	–	3	–	1
Temple		–		3	–	2	–	0
Penn		–		7	–	4	–	0
Army		–		5	–	3	–	0
Brown		–		6	–	4	–	0
Franklin & Marshall		–		6	–	4	–	0
Holy Cross		–		4	–	3	–	1
Rutgers		–		5	–	4	–	0
Tufts		–		5	–	4	–	0
Fordham		–		4	–	4	–	0
Villanova		–		3	–	3	–	0
Lafayette		–		4	–	5	–	1
Syracuse		–		4	–	5	–	0
Carnegie Tech		–		3	–	4	–	1
New Hampshire		–		3	–	4	–	1
Geneva		–		3	–	4	–	0
Vermont		–		3	–	5	–	0
Pittsburgh		–		3	–	6	–	0
Boston College		–		2	–	4	–	1
Cornell		–		3	–	7	–	0
NYU		–		2	–	6	–	0

The 1912 Holy Cross football team was an American football team that represented the College of the Holy Cross as an independent diring the 1912 college football season. In its sixth and final year under head coach Timothy F. Larkin, the team compiled a 4–3–1 record. Frederick V. Ostergren was the team captain. Holy Cross played home games at Fitton Field on the college's campus in Worcester, Massachusetts. A new concrete grandstand was dedicated at the first home game, on October 12.

Holy Cross was scheduled to visit Army on November 2, but the game was canceled due to the funeral of United States Vice President James S. Sherman.

== Schedule ==
Date	Opponent	Site	Result	Attendance	Source
September 28	at Yale	Yale Field; New Haven, CT	L 0–7	2,000	
October 5	at Harvard	Harvard Stadium; Boston, MA	L 0–19	7,000	
October 12	Norwich	Fitton Field; Worcester, MA	L 0–6		
October 19	at Springfield YMCA	Pratt Field; Springfield, MA	W 7–0		
October 26	Massachusetts	Fitton Field; Worcester, MA	T 6–6		
November 2	at Army	The Plain; West Point, NY	Canceled		
November 9	Vermont	Fitton Field; Worcester, MA	W 13–0		
November 16	Worcester Polytechnic	Fitton Field; Worcester, MA	W 27–0		
November 28	at Saint Louis	Sportsman's Park; St. Louis, MO	W 24–15	8,000	
