= 1912 Lehigh Brown and White football team =

American college football season

1912 Lehigh Brown and White football
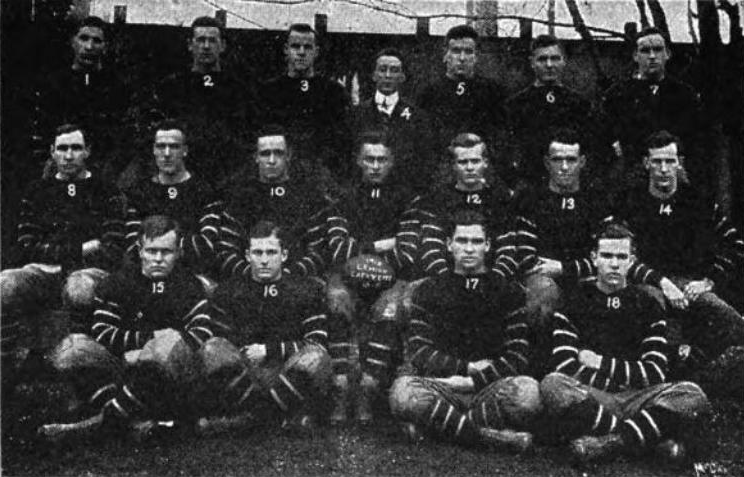
- Conference: Independent
- Record: 9–2
- Head coach: Tom Keady (1st season)
- Home stadium: Lehigh Field

1912 Eastern college football independents records
	Conf.			Overall
Team	W	L	T	W		L		T
Harvard		–		9	–	0	–	0
Penn State		–		8	–	0	–	0
Carlisle		–		12	–	1	–	1
Princeton		–		7	–	1	–	1
Swarthmore		–		7	–	1	–	1
Yale		–		7	–	1	–	1
Lehigh		–		9	–	2	–	0
Dartmouth		–		7	–	2	–	0
Wesleyan		–		7	–	2	–	0
Colgate		–		5	–	2	–	0
Washington & Jefferson		–		8	–	3	–	1
Rhode Island State		–		6	–	3	–	0
Bucknell		–		6	–	3	–	1
Temple		–		3	–	2	–	0
Penn		–		7	–	4	–	0
Army		–		5	–	3	–	0
Brown		–		6	–	4	–	0
Franklin & Marshall		–		6	–	4	–	0
Holy Cross		–		4	–	3	–	1
Rutgers		–		5	–	4	–	0
Tufts		–		5	–	4	–	0
Fordham		–		4	–	4	–	0
Villanova		–		3	–	3	–	0
Lafayette		–		4	–	5	–	1
Syracuse		–		4	–	5	–	0
Carnegie Tech		–		3	–	4	–	1
New Hampshire		–		3	–	4	–	1
Geneva		–		3	–	4	–	0
Vermont		–		3	–	5	–	0
Pittsburgh		–		3	–	6	–	0
Boston College		–		2	–	4	–	1
Cornell		–		3	–	7	–	0
NYU		–		2	–	6	–	0

The 1912 Lehigh Brown and White football team was an American football team that represented Lehigh University as an independent during the 1912 college football season. In its first season under head coach Tom Keady, the team compiled a 9–2 record and outscored opponents by a total of 222 to 72. Lehigh played home games at Lehigh Field in Bethlehem, Pennsylvania.

== Schedule ==
Date	Opponent	Site	Result	Source
September 25	Albright	Lehigh Field; Bethlehem, PA	W 33–0	
September 28	Delaware	Lehigh Field; Bethlehem, PA	W 45–0	
October 5	at Princeton	University Field; Princeton, NJ	L 0–35	
October 12	at Navy	Worden Field; Annapolis, MD	W 14–0	
October 19	Haverford	Lehigh Field; Bethlehem, PA	W 55–0	
October 26	at Ursinus	Collegeville, PA	W 12–0	
November 2	Carlisle	Lehigh Field; Bethlehem, PA	L 14–34	
November 9	at Swarthmore	Swarthmore, PA	W 3–0	
November 16	at Muhlenberg	Allentown, PA	W 7–3	
November 23	at Lafayette	March Field; Easton, PA (rivalry)	W 10–0	
November 28	at Franklin & Marshall	Lancaster, PA	W 29–0	
