= 1912 Army Cadets football team =

American college football season

1912 Army Cadets football
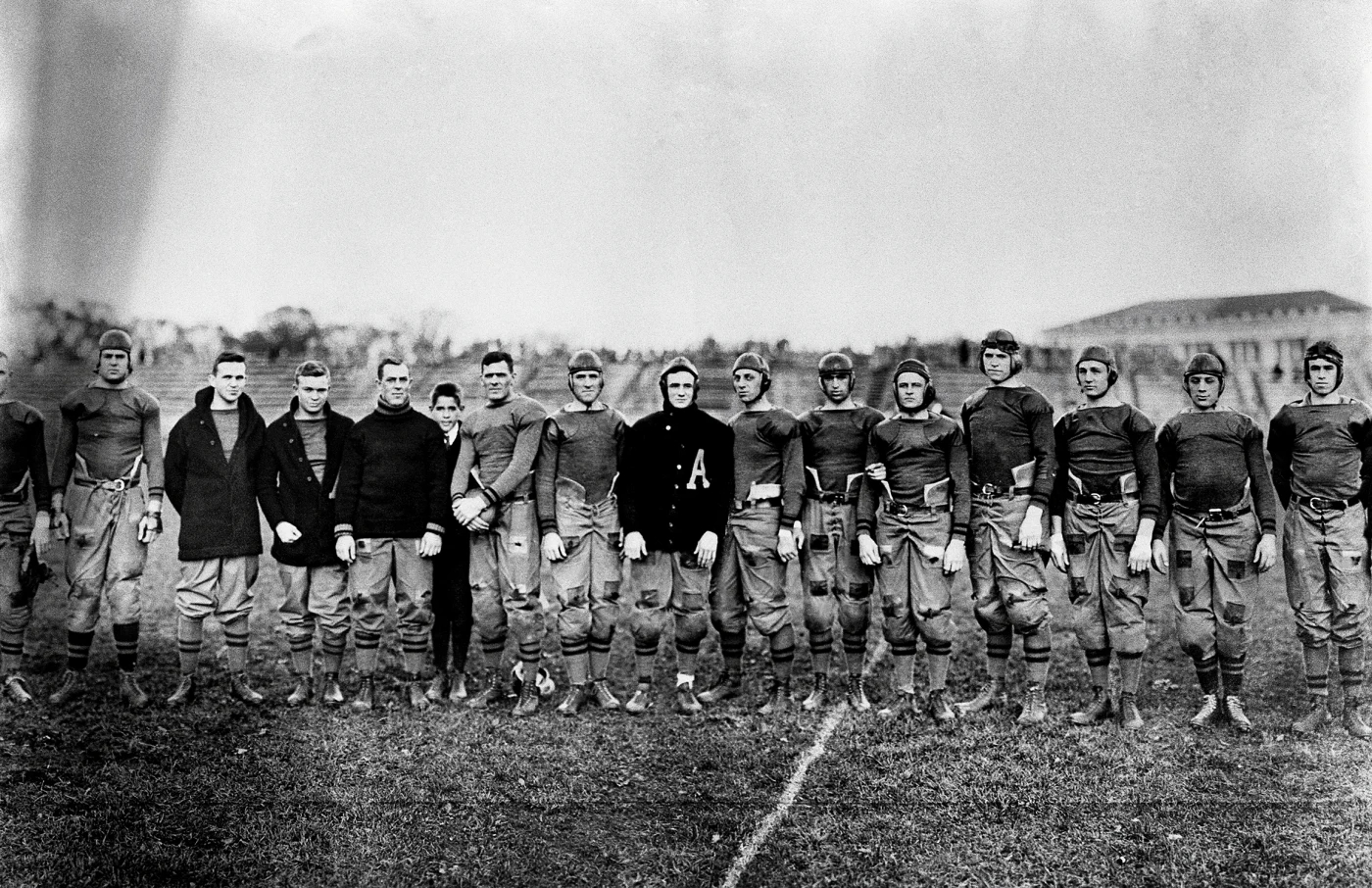
- Dwight D. Eisenhower (3rd from left) and Omar Bradley (far right) were members of the 1912 West Point football team.
- Conference: Independent
- Record: 5–3
- Head coach: Ernest Graves Sr. (2nd season)
- Captain: Leland Devore
- Home stadium: The Plain

1912 Eastern college football independents records
	Conf.			Overall
Team	W	L	T	W		L		T
Harvard		–		9	–	0	–	0
Penn State		–		8	–	0	–	0
Carlisle		–		12	–	1	–	1
Princeton		–		7	–	1	–	1
Swarthmore		–		7	–	1	–	1
Yale		–		7	–	1	–	1
Lehigh		–		9	–	2	–	0
Dartmouth		–		7	–	2	–	0
Wesleyan		–		7	–	2	–	0
Colgate		–		5	–	2	–	0
Washington & Jefferson		–		8	–	3	–	1
Rhode Island State		–		6	–	3	–	0
Bucknell		–		6	–	3	–	1
Temple		–		3	–	2	–	0
Penn		–		7	–	4	–	0
Army		–		5	–	3	–	0
Brown		–		6	–	4	–	0
Franklin & Marshall		–		6	–	4	–	0
Holy Cross		–		4	–	3	–	1
Rutgers		–		5	–	4	–	0
Tufts		–		5	–	4	–	0
Fordham		–		4	–	4	–	0
Villanova		–		3	–	3	–	0
Lafayette		–		4	–	5	–	1
Syracuse		–		4	–	5	–	0
Carnegie Tech		–		3	–	4	–	1
New Hampshire		–		3	–	4	–	1
Vermont		–		3	–	5	–	0
Pittsburgh		–		3	–	6	–	0
Boston College		–		2	–	4	–	1
Cornell		–		3	–	7	–	0
NYU		–		2	–	6	–	0

The 1912 Army Cadets football team was an American football team that represented the United States Military Academy as an independent during the 1912 college football season. Under head coach Ernest Graves Sr., the Cadets compiled a 5–3 record and outscored opponents by a total of 108 to 59. The Cadets lost to a one-loss Yale team, a strong Carlisle Indians team led by 1912 decathlon gold medalist Jim Thorpe, and to Navy in the annual Army–Navy Game.

Dwight D. Eisenhower, later the 34th president of the United States, played at the halfback position before suffering a career-ending injury in a game against Tufts. Three players started all eight games for Army: Leland Hobbs at halfback; Vernon Prichard at quarterback; and Vern Scott Purnell at center. Other notable players on the team included Omar Bradley, who was chairman of the Joint Chiefs of Staff during the Korean War; Robert Neyland, later the long-time head football coach at the University of Tennessee; Geoffrey Keyes, Leland Devore, William M. Hoge, and Louis A. Merrilat.

== Schedule ==
Date	Opponent	Site	Result	Attendance	Source
October 5	Stevens	The Plain; West Point, NY	W 27–0		
October 12	Rutgers	The Plain; West Point, NY	W 19–0		
October 19	Yale	The Plain; West Point, NY	L 0–6	15,000	
October 26	Colgate	The Plain; West Point, NY	W 18–7		
November 2	Holy Cross	The Plain; West Point, NY	Canceled		
November 9	Carlisle	The Plain; West Point, NY	L 6–27		
November 16	Tufts	The Plain; West Point, NY	W 15–6		
November 23	Syracuse	The Plain; West Point, NY	W 23–7		
November 30	vs. Navy	Franklin Field; Philadelphia, PA (Army–Navy Game)	L 0–6	35,000	

== Eisenhower's role ==
Dwight Eisenhower was a second-year cadet in the fall of 1912. After playing on the freshman team in 1911, he played at halfback for the 1912 team. He played in the first six games of the season. The New York Times called him "one of the most promising backs in Eastern football" and dubbed him the "Kansas Cyclone." After his performance in a close loss to Yale, the New York Tribune wrote that Eisenhower "is developing into a splendid back."

Eisenhower's college football playing career ended on November 16 when he twisted his knee in a game against Tufts. Eisenhower was hospitalized for a couple days but returned to practice, hoping to play in the Army–Navy Game. Later in the week, he landed badly after a "monkey drill", vaulting over a horse, and his "knee crumpled, tearing the cartilage and tendons." When the cast was removed, doctors advised Eisenhower that he would never again play football.

== Season overview ==
=== Preseason ===
The 1911 Army football team had compiled a 6–1–1 record. On December 6, 1911, the lettermen from the 1911 team selected tackle Leland Devore to be captain of the 1912 team. Devore was the tallest man in academy at six feet, three-and-a-half inches. Nine veterans from the 1911 team were lost to graduation, including Hyatt, Dean, Arnold and Littlejohn.

In August 1912, Lieutenant Ernest Graves Sr. was chosen as the head coach of the Army team. He had most recently served as Harvard's line coach. Previously, he was also Army's head coach in 1906. Harry Tuthill, trainer for the Detroit Tigers baseball team, was hired in early September 1912 to train the Cadets.

=== Stevens ===
Army opened its 1912 season on October 5 with a 27–0 victory over Stevens Institute at The Plain in West Point, New York. Army relied heavily on the forward pass to move the ball against Stevens. Wynne scored two touchdown, and Hobbs and Hodgson scored one each. Devore kicked two goals after touchdown, and Prichard converted one of his two attempts.

=== Rutgers ===
On October 12, Army defeated Rutgers, 19–0, at West Point. Army scored its first touchdown in the first quarter after intercepting a Navy pass. Hobbs scored the touchdown. In the second quarter, Army scored again on a touchdown pass from Prichard to Gillespie. Prichard later threw to Merrillat for 30 yards and a touchdown. The game was the first start for Dwight Eisenhower.

=== Yale ===
On October 19, Army lost to Yale, 6–0, before a crowd of 15,000 at West Point. Army had defeated Yale in both 1910 and 1911. The only points of the game were scored by Yale on a touchdown in the second quarter. Holliday Philbin scored Yale's touchdown and came within a foot of scoring a second touchdown. Army attempted two long field goals, but both were unsuccessful. Yale out-gained Army on the ground by 185 yards to 121 yards. In the passing game, Yale gained 36 yards to 21 for Army.

=== Colgate ===
On October 26, Army defeated Colgate, 18–7, at West Point. Colgate scored in the first three minutes of the game, after advancing to the Army 15-yard line on a long pass from Huntington to Riley. Swartout scored the Colgate touchdown. Army held Colgate scoreless for the remainder of the game. Army's touchdowns were scored by Hobbs, Keyes, and Prichard.

=== Carlisle ===
On November 9, Army suffered its worst defeat of the season, losing by a 27–6 score against the Carlisle Indians. Carlisle was led by Jim Thorpe, who had recently won gold medals in both the decathlon and pentathlon in the 1912 Summer Olympics and who was regarded as "the world's greatest all-around athlete" and "one of the greatest football players of all time." Thorpe was described as "irresistible" in the game, "tearing through and around the Cadets' defense." The New York Tribune wrote that Thorpe's running against Army was "a revelation", as he ran "like a streak" through the Army line, "scattering tacklers to all sides of him." Carlisle's right halfback Arcasa also had a strong game, scoring three touchdowns. Army left halfback Leland Hobbs scored the Cadets' only touchdown.

As Dwight Eisenhower rose to prominence, later accounts of the game focused on the match-up between Thorpe at left halfback for Carlisle and Eisenhower at right halfback for Army. Bob Neyland, who was a backup on Army's 1912 team, asserted in 1953 that Eisenhower "played the greatest game of his career against the great Thorpe", though he also incorrectly recalled that Eisenhower scored Army's touchdown (game accounts show the Army touchdown was scored by Hobbs).

According to another account, Eisenhower and teammate Charles Benedict "ferociously tackled Thorpe -- one hitting him high, the other low -- in an attempt to knock him out of the game." Eisenhower recalled that Thorpe "got up, walked back to the huddle and ran for another first down." Later in the game, Thorpe put "a fancy move" on Eisenhower and Benedict, causing them to crash into each other, both of them being left unable to play for the remainder of the game.

=== Tufts ===
On November 16, Army defeated Tufts, 15–6, in a closely-contested game at West Point. The New York Tribune described Tufts' line as "a stone wall" and noted that Army was "hard pressed at all times." Tufts scored a touchdown when Vernon Prichard muffed a punt return and Tufts recovered the ball and returning it for a touchdown. Army also scored on a fumbled kickoff, Hobbs recovering the loose ball and Richard then scoring on a one-yard run. Keyes scored Army's second touchdown, as he was pushed over the goal line. Keyes also kicked a field goal later in the game.

=== Syracuse ===
On November 23, Army defeated Syracuse, 23–7, at West Point. Fullback Geoffrey Keyes ran for two touchdowns and also kicked a field goal and two extra points for a total of 17 points. Army's third touchdown was scored by Altman. In the last minute of the game, an Army player (Lanphier) muffed trying to field a Syracuse punt; the ball rolled across Army's goal line where Farber fell on the ball for Syracuse's lone touchdown.

=== Army–Navy Game ===
On November 30, Army lost to Navy, 6–0, in the annual Army–Navy Game at Franklin Field in Philadelphia. The game drew a crowd of 35,000 spectators, the largest crowd to that point to attend a game at Franklin Field. The game was scoreless through the first three quarters. In the second quarter, Army's left end, Louis A. Merrilat, took the ball deep into Navy territory, but left halfback Leland Hobbs, turned the ball over on a fumble. In the fourth quarter, Navy's right guard, Jack Brown, kicked two field goals, first from the 23-yard line and later from the 36-yard line. After the game, the Midshipmen "kidnapped the Army mule and then captured the Army's flag," which was then torn into ribbons as souvenirs of the victory. Several Army players, including captain Leland Devore, wept in the locker room.

== Personnel ==
=== Players ===
The following players started at least one game for the 1912 Army football team:

- Altman - started one game at fullback
- Charles Calvert Benedict - started four games at fullback, two games at halfback
- Leland Devore - started six games at tackle
- Dwight D. Eisenhower - started three games at halfback
- Gillespie - started three games at end
- Herrick - started five games at guard
- Leland Hobbs - started all eight games at halfback
- William M. Hoge - started five games at end
- Huston - started two games at guard
- Jones - started five games at guard
- Kerr - started one game at guard
- Geoffrey Keyes - started three games at halfback, two games at fullback
- Larabee - started one game at tackle
- Larkin - started two games at tackle
- John P. Markoe - started five games at end
- Louis A. Merrillat - started two games at end
- Frank W. Milburn - started one game at halfback
- O'Hare - started one game at guard
- Vernon Prichard - started all eight games at quarterback
- Vern Scott Purnell - started all eight games at center
- Rosevear - started one game at end
- Rowley - tackle
- Alexander M. Weyand - started two games at guard
- Wynne - started three games at tackle

=== Staff ===
- Head coach - Ernest Graves Sr.
- Assistant coaches - Daniel A. Sultan, Dean, Arnold, and Wood
- Trainer - Harry Tuthill
