= 1912 Penn State Nittany Lions football team =

American college football season

1912 Penn State Nittany Lions football
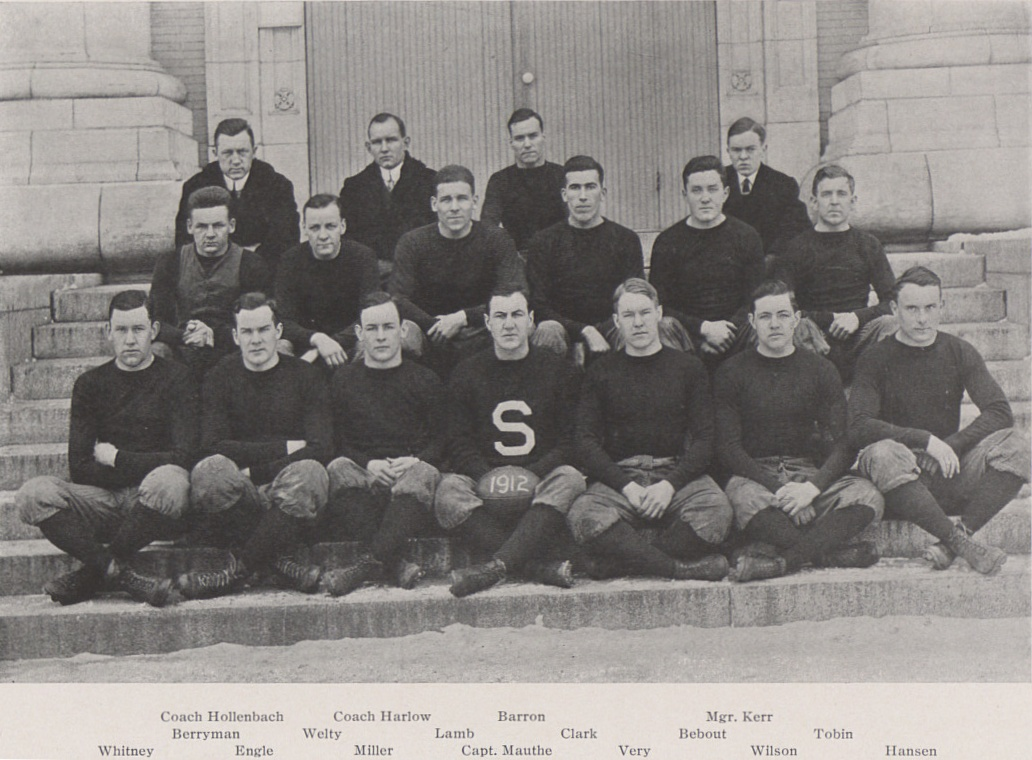

Co-national champion (NCF)
- Conference: Independent
- Record: 8–0
- Head coach: Bill Hollenback (3rd season)
- Captain: Pete Mauthe
- Home stadium: New Beaver Field

1912 Eastern college football independents records
	Conf.			Overall
Team	W	L	T	W		L		T
Harvard		–		9	–	0	–	0
Penn State		–		8	–	0	–	0
Carlisle		–		12	–	1	–	1
Princeton		–		7	–	1	–	1
Swarthmore		–		7	–	1	–	1
Yale		–		7	–	1	–	1
Lehigh		–		9	–	2	–	0
Dartmouth		–		7	–	2	–	0
Wesleyan		–		7	–	2	–	0
Colgate		–		5	–	2	–	0
Washington & Jefferson		–		8	–	3	–	1
Rhode Island State		–		6	–	3	–	0
Bucknell		–		6	–	3	–	1
Temple		–		3	–	2	–	0
Penn		–		7	–	4	–	0
Army		–		5	–	3	–	0
Brown		–		6	–	4	–	0
Franklin & Marshall		–		6	–	4	–	0
Holy Cross		–		4	–	3	–	1
Rutgers		–		5	–	4	–	0
Tufts		–		5	–	4	–	0
Fordham		–		4	–	4	–	0
Villanova		–		3	–	3	–	0
Lafayette		–		4	–	5	–	1
Syracuse		–		4	–	5	–	0
Carnegie Tech		–		3	–	4	–	1
New Hampshire		–		3	–	4	–	1
Vermont		–		3	–	5	–	0
Pittsburgh		–		3	–	6	–	0
Boston College		–		2	–	4	–	1
Cornell		–		3	–	7	–	0
NYU		–		2	–	6	–	0

The 1912 Penn State Nittany Lions football team was an American football team that represented Pennsylvania State College as an independent during the 1912 college football season. In their third season under head coach Bill Hollenback, the team compiled an 8–0 record, shut out seven of eight opponents, and outscored all opponents by a total of 285 to 6.

There was no contemporaneous system in 1912 for determining a national champion. However, Penn State was retroactively named as the national champion by the National Championship Foundation. Harvard was recognized as the 1912 national champion by most selectors.

This team is known for playing the first of a series of games against eventual rival Ohio State, in which the Buckeyes forfeited because of the alleged rough play of the Nittany Lions once the score was 37–0. The official score was 1–0, but the gameball lists the score as 37–0.

Three persons associated with the 1912 Penn State team were later inducted into the College Football Hall of Fame: coach Hollenback (inducted 1951); fullback Pete Mauthe (inducted 1957); and quarterback Shorty Miller (inducted 1974).

== Schedule ==
Date	Opponent	Site	Result	Attendance	Source
October 5	Carnegie Tech	New Beaver Field; State College, PA	W 41–0		
October 12	Washington & Jefferson	New Beaver Field; State College, PA	W 30–0	4,000	
October 19	at Cornell	Percy Field; Ithaca, NY	W 29–6		
October 26	Gettysburg	New Beaver Field; State College, PA	W 25–0		
November 2	at Penn	Franklin Field; Philadelphia, PA	W 14–0	15,000	
November 9	Villanova	New Beaver Field; State College, PA	W 71–0		
November 16	at Ohio State	Ohio Field; Columbus, OH (rivalry)	W 37–0	3,500	
November 28	at Pittsburgh	Forbes Field; Pittsburgh, PA (rivalry)	W 38–0	15,000	

== Roster ==
- Albert Barron, E
- James Bebout, G
- Punk Berryman, HB
- John B. Clark, C
- Devine, E
- Engle, T
- Fisher, C
- Hansen, G
- Keller, HB
- Levi Lamb, T
- Langdon, QB
- Pete Mauthe, FB
- McNulty, FB
- McVean, T
- J. Miller, G
- Shorty Miller, QB
- Sayre, T
- Smeart, E
- Elgie Tobin, FB
- Dexter Very, E
- Vogel, T
- Welling, HB
- Welty, HB
- Werder, C
- O. Weston, HB
- W. Weston, E
- Whitney, T
- Wilson, E
