= 1912 Princeton Tigers football team =

American college football season

1912 Princeton Tigers football
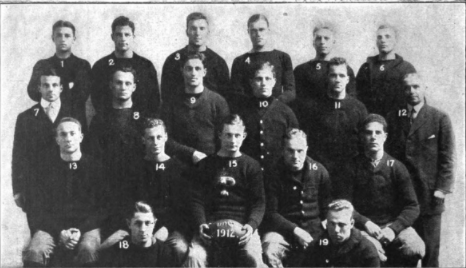
- Conference: Independent
- Record: 7–1–1
- Head coach: Logan Cunningham (1st season)
- Captain: Tal Pendleton
- Home stadium: University Field

1912 Eastern college football independents records
	Conf.			Overall
Team	W	L	T	W		L		T
Harvard		–		9	–	0	–	0
Penn State		–		8	–	0	–	0
Carlisle		–		12	–	1	–	1
Princeton		–		7	–	1	–	1
Swarthmore		–		7	–	1	–	1
Yale		–		7	–	1	–	1
Lehigh		–		9	–	2	–	0
Dartmouth		–		7	–	2	–	0
Wesleyan		–		7	–	2	–	0
Colgate		–		5	–	2	–	0
Washington & Jefferson		–		8	–	3	–	1
Rhode Island State		–		6	–	3	–	0
Bucknell		–		6	–	3	–	1
Temple		–		3	–	2	–	0
Penn		–		7	–	4	–	0
Army		–		5	–	3	–	0
Brown		–		6	–	4	–	0
Franklin & Marshall		–		6	–	4	–	0
Holy Cross		–		4	–	3	–	1
Rutgers		–		5	–	4	–	0
Tufts		–		5	–	4	–	0
Fordham		–		4	–	4	–	0
Villanova		–		3	–	3	–	0
Lafayette		–		4	–	5	–	1
Syracuse		–		4	–	5	–	0
Carnegie Tech		–		3	–	4	–	1
New Hampshire		–		3	–	4	–	1
Geneva		–		3	–	4	–	0
Vermont		–		3	–	5	–	0
Pittsburgh		–		3	–	6	–	0
Boston College		–		2	–	4	–	1
Cornell		–		3	–	7	–	0
NYU		–		2	–	6	–	0

The 1912 Princeton Tigers football team represented Princeton University in the 1912 college football season. The team finished with a 7–1–1 record under first-year head coach Walter G. Andrews, outscoring opponents by a total of 322 to 35 with the sole loss being to Harvard by 16–6 score. Princeton W. John Logan was selected as a consensus first-team honoree on the 1912 College Football All-America Team, and five other players (halfback Hobey Baker, fullback Wallace "Butch" De Witt, guard Rip Shenk, and tackles Phillips and Penfield) were selected as first-team honorees by at least one selector.

== Schedule ==
Date	Opponent	Site	Result	Attendance	Source
September 28	Stevens	University Field; Princeton, NJ	W 65–0		
October 2	Rutgers	University Field; Princeton, NJ (rivalry)	W 41–6		
October 5	Lehigh	University Field; Princeton, NJ	W 35–0		
October 12	VPI	University Field; Princeton, NJ	W 31–0		
October 19	Syracuse	University Field; Princeton, NJ	W 62–0		
October 26	Dartmouth	University Field; Princeton, NJ	W 22–7		
November 2	at Harvard	Harvard Stadium; Boston, MA (rivalry)	L 6–16	30,000	
November 9	NYU	University Field; Princeton, NJ	W 54–0		
November 16	Yale	University Field; Princeton, NJ (rivalry)	T 6–6		
