= 1912 Syracuse Orangemen football team =

American college football season

1912 Syracuse Orangemen football
- Syracuse captain Rudolph Propst (L) with captain Jack Forsyth of Rochester
- Conference: Independent
- Record: 4–5
- Head coach: C. DeForest Cummings (2nd season)
- Captain: Rudolph Propst
- Home stadium: Archbold Stadium

1912 Eastern college football independents records
	Conf.			Overall
Team	W	L	T	W		L		T
Harvard		–		9	–	0	–	0
Penn State		–		8	–	0	–	0
Carlisle		–		12	–	1	–	1
Princeton		–		7	–	1	–	1
Swarthmore		–		7	–	1	–	1
Yale		–		7	–	1	–	1
Lehigh		–		9	–	2	–	0
Dartmouth		–		7	–	2	–	0
Wesleyan		–		7	–	2	–	0
Colgate		–		5	–	2	–	0
Washington & Jefferson		–		8	–	3	–	1
Rhode Island State		–		6	–	3	–	0
Bucknell		–		6	–	3	–	1
Temple		–		3	–	2	–	0
Penn		–		7	–	4	–	0
Army		–		5	–	3	–	0
Brown		–		6	–	4	–	0
Franklin & Marshall		–		6	–	4	–	0
Holy Cross		–		4	–	3	–	1
Rutgers		–		5	–	4	–	0
Tufts		–		5	–	4	–	0
Fordham		–		4	–	4	–	0
Villanova		–		3	–	3	–	0
Lafayette		–		4	–	5	–	1
Syracuse		–		4	–	5	–	0
Carnegie Tech		–		3	–	4	–	1
New Hampshire		–		3	–	4	–	1
Vermont		–		3	–	5	–	0
Pittsburgh		–		3	–	6	–	0
Boston College		–		2	–	4	–	1
Cornell		–		3	–	7	–	0
NYU		–		2	–	6	–	0

The 1912 Syracuse Orangemen football team represented Syracuse University as an independent during the 1912 college football season. Led by C. DeForest Cummings in his second and final season as head coach, the Orangemen compiled a record of 4–5. The team played home games at Archbold Stadium in Syracuse, New York.

== Schedule ==
Date	Opponent	Site	Result	Source
September 28	Hobart	Archbold Stadium; Syracuse, NY	W 12–0	
October 5	at Yale	Yale Field; New Haven, CT	L 0–21	
October 12	Carlisle	Archbold Stadium; Syracuse, NY	L 0–33	
October 19	at Princeton	University Field; Princeton, NJ	L 0–62	
October 26	Michigan	Archbold Stadium; Syracuse, NY	W 18–7	
November 2	Rochester	Archbold Stadium; Syracuse, NY	W 28–0	
November 9	at Lafayette	March Field; Easton, PA	W 30–7	
November 16	Colgate	Archbold Stadium; Syracuse, NY	L 0–7	
November 23	at Army	The Plain; West Point, NY	L 7–23	
