= 1912 Rhode Island State football team =

American college football season

1912 Rhode Island State football
- Conference: Independent
- Record: 6–3
- Head coach: Robert Bingham (1st season)

1912 Eastern college football independents records
	Conf.			Overall
Team	W	L	T	W		L		T
Harvard		–		9	–	0	–	0
Penn State		–		8	–	0	–	0
Carlisle		–		12	–	1	–	1
Princeton		–		7	–	1	–	1
Swarthmore		–		7	–	1	–	1
Yale		–		7	–	1	–	1
Lehigh		–		9	–	2	–	0
Dartmouth		–		7	–	2	–	0
Wesleyan		–		7	–	2	–	0
Colgate		–		5	–	2	–	0
Washington & Jefferson		–		8	–	3	–	1
Rhode Island State		–		6	–	3	–	0
Bucknell		–		6	–	3	–	1
Temple		–		3	–	2	–	0
Penn		–		7	–	4	–	0
Army		–		5	–	3	–	0
Brown		–		6	–	4	–	0
Franklin & Marshall		–		6	–	4	–	0
Holy Cross		–		4	–	3	–	1
Rutgers		–		5	–	4	–	0
Tufts		–		5	–	4	–	0
Fordham		–		4	–	4	–	0
Villanova		–		3	–	3	–	0
Lafayette		–		4	–	5	–	1
Syracuse		–		4	–	5	–	0
Carnegie Tech		–		3	–	4	–	1
New Hampshire		–		3	–	4	–	1
Geneva		–		3	–	4	–	0
Vermont		–		3	–	5	–	0
Pittsburgh		–		3	–	6	–	0
Boston College		–		2	–	4	–	1
Cornell		–		3	–	7	–	0
NYU		–		2	–	6	–	0

The 1912 Rhode Island State football team was an American football team that represented Rhode Island State College (later renamed the University of Rhode Island) as an independent during the 1912 college football season. In its first year under head coach Robert Bingham, the team compiled a 6–3 record.

== Schedule ==
Date	Opponent	Site	Result	Source
September 21	at Massachusetts	Amherst, MA	W 7–0	
September 28	Pawtucket Athletic Club	Kingston, RI	W 20–0	
October 5	at Brown	Andrews Field; Providence, RI (rivalry)	L 0–14	
October 12	at Maine	Alumni Field; Orono, ME	L 0–18	
October 19	at Fordham	American League Park; New York, NY	W 6–0	
October 26	Worcester Tech	Kingston, RI	W 27–0	
November 2	New Hampshire	Kingston, RI	W 25–0	
November 9	Fort Greble	Kingston, RI	W 14–6	
November 16	at NYU	Ohio Field; Bronx, NY	L 7–14	
