= C. DeForest Cummings =

American football player and coach (1880–1957)

Biographical details
- Born: July 15, 1880; Springville, New York, U.S.
- Died: June 15, 1957 (aged 76); Buffalo, New York, U.S.

Playing career
- 1898–1901: Syracuse

Coaching career (HC unless noted)
- 1911–1912: Syracuse

Head coaching record
- Overall: 9–8–2

Charles DeForest Cummings (July 15, 1880 – June 15, 1957) was an American college football player and coach. He served as the head football coach at Syracuse University from 1911 to 1912, compiling a record of 9–8–2.

== Head coaching record ==
| Year | Team | Overall | Conference | Standing | Bowl/playoffs |
|---|---|---|---|---|---|
Syracuse Orangemen (Independent) (1911–1912)
| 1911 | Syracuse | 5–3–2 | | | |
| 1912 | Syracuse | 4–5 | | | |
| Syracuse: | | 9–8–2 | | | |
| Total: | | 9–8–2 | | | |
