= 1912 Rutgers Queensmen football team =

American college football season

1912 Rutgers Queensmen football
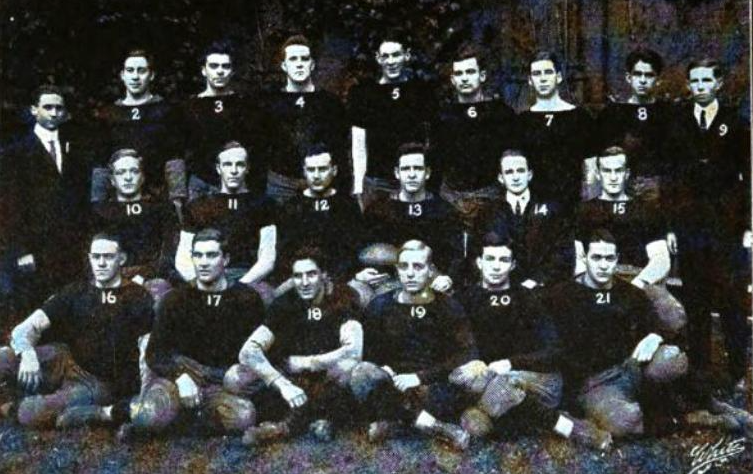
- Conference: Independent
- Record: 5–4
- Head coach: Howard Gargan (3rd season)
- Captain: Theodore Van Winkle
- Home stadium: Neilson Field

1912 Eastern college football independents records
	Conf.			Overall
Team	W	L	T	W		L		T
Harvard		–		9	–	0	–	0
Penn State		–		8	–	0	–	0
Carlisle		–		12	–	1	–	1
Princeton		–		7	–	1	–	1
Swarthmore		–		7	–	1	–	1
Yale		–		7	–	1	–	1
Lehigh		–		9	–	2	–	0
Dartmouth		–		7	–	2	–	0
Wesleyan		–		7	–	2	–	0
Colgate		–		5	–	2	–	0
Washington & Jefferson		–		8	–	3	–	1
Rhode Island State		–		6	–	3	–	0
Bucknell		–		6	–	3	–	1
Temple		–		3	–	2	–	0
Penn		–		7	–	4	–	0
Army		–		5	–	3	–	0
Brown		–		6	–	4	–	0
Franklin & Marshall		–		6	–	4	–	0
Holy Cross		–		4	–	3	–	1
Rutgers		–		5	–	4	–	0
Tufts		–		5	–	4	–	0
Fordham		–		4	–	4	–	0
Villanova		–		3	–	3	–	0
Lafayette		–		4	–	5	–	1
Syracuse		–		4	–	5	–	0
Carnegie Tech		–		3	–	4	–	1
New Hampshire		–		3	–	4	–	1
Geneva		–		3	–	4	–	0
Vermont		–		3	–	5	–	0
Pittsburgh		–		3	–	6	–	0
Boston College		–		2	–	4	–	1
Cornell		–		3	–	7	–	0
NYU		–		2	–	6	–	0

The 1912 Rutgers Queensmen football team represented Rutgers University as an independent during the 1912 college football season. In their third and final season under head coach Howard Gargan, the Queensmen compiled a 5–4 record and outscored their opponents, 112 to 102. The team captain was Theodore Van Winkle.

== Schedule ==
Date	Opponent	Site	Result	Source
September 28	Franklin & Marshall	Neilson Field; New Brunswick, NJ	L 0–20	
October 2	at Princeton	University Field; Princeton, NJ (rivalry)	L 6–41	
October 12	at Army	The Plain; West Point, NY	L 0–19	
October 19	Hobart	Neilson Field; New Brunswick, NJ	W 16–7	
October 26	at Union (NY)	Schenectady, NY	L 0–3	
November 2	Hamilton	Neilson Field; New Brunswick, NJ	W 25–6	
November 9	RPI	Neilson Field; New Brunswick, NJ	W 21–0	
November 16	at Haverford	Walton Field; Haverford, PA	W 18–0	
November 23	at Stevens	Stevens Field; Hoboken, NJ	W 26–6	
