= 1912 Bucknell football team =

American college football season

1912 Bucknell football
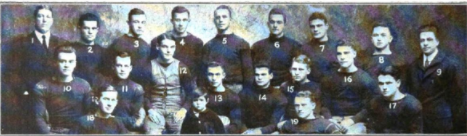
- Conference: Independent
- Record: 6–3–1
- Head coach: Byron W. Dickson (3rd season)

1912 Eastern college football independents records
	Conf.			Overall
Team	W	L	T	W		L		T
Harvard		–		9	–	0	–	0
Penn State		–		8	–	0	–	0
Carlisle		–		12	–	1	–	1
Princeton		–		7	–	1	–	1
Swarthmore		–		7	–	1	–	1
Yale		–		7	–	1	–	1
Lehigh		–		9	–	2	–	0
Dartmouth		–		7	–	2	–	0
Wesleyan		–		7	–	2	–	0
Colgate		–		5	–	2	–	0
Washington & Jefferson		–		8	–	3	–	1
Rhode Island State		–		6	–	3	–	0
Bucknell		–		6	–	3	–	1
Temple		–		3	–	2	–	0
Penn		–		7	–	4	–	0
Army		–		5	–	3	–	0
Brown		–		6	–	4	–	0
Franklin & Marshall		–		6	–	4	–	0
Holy Cross		–		4	–	3	–	1
Rutgers		–		5	–	4	–	0
Tufts		–		5	–	4	–	0
Fordham		–		4	–	4	–	0
Villanova		–		3	–	3	–	0
Lafayette		–		4	–	5	–	1
Syracuse		–		4	–	5	–	0
Carnegie Tech		–		3	–	4	–	1
New Hampshire		–		3	–	4	–	1
Vermont		–		3	–	5	–	0
Pittsburgh		–		3	–	6	–	0
Boston College		–		2	–	4	–	1
Cornell		–		3	–	7	–	0
NYU		–		2	–	6	–	0

The 1912 Bucknell football team was an American football team that represented Bucknell University as an independent during the 1912 college football season. In its third season under head coach Byron W. Dickson, the team compiled a 6–3–1 record.

== Schedule ==
Date	Time	Opponent	Site	Result	Attendance	Source
September 28		Hillman Academy		W 41–0		
October 5		Wyoming Seminary		W 49–0		
October 12		at Pittsburgh	Forbes Field; Pittsburgh, PA	W 6–0		
October 19		St. Bonaventure		W 39–7		
October 26		at Cornell	Percy Field; Ithaca, NY	L 0–14		
November 2		at Lafayette	March Field; Easton, PA	T 0–0		
November 9		at Navy	Worden Field; Annapolis, MD	W 17–7		
November 16		at Swarthmore	Swarthmore, PA	L 13–14		
November 23	3:00 p.m.	vs. Gettysburg	Island Park; Harrisburg, PA	W 35–0	2,000	
November 28		at Washington & Jefferson	Washington, PA	L 7–22	5,000	
All times are in Eastern time
