= 1912 Penn Quakers football team =

American college football season

1912 Penn Quakers football
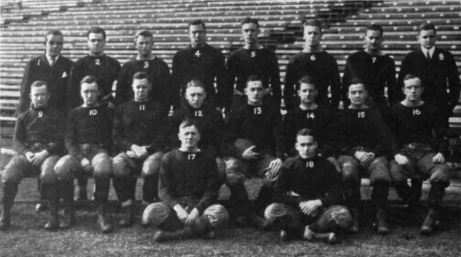
- Conference: Independent
- Record: 7–4
- Head coach: Andy Smith (4th season)
- Captain: Leroy Mercer
- Home stadium: Franklin Field

1912 Eastern college football independents records
	Conf.			Overall
Team	W	L	T	W		L		T
Harvard		–		9	–	0	–	0
Penn State		–		8	–	0	–	0
Carlisle		–		12	–	1	–	1
Princeton		–		7	–	1	–	1
Swarthmore		–		7	–	1	–	1
Yale		–		7	–	1	–	1
Lehigh		–		9	–	2	–	0
Dartmouth		–		7	–	2	–	0
Wesleyan		–		7	–	2	–	0
Colgate		–		5	–	2	–	0
Washington & Jefferson		–		8	–	3	–	1
Rhode Island State		–		6	–	3	–	0
Bucknell		–		6	–	3	–	1
Temple		–		3	–	2	–	0
Penn		–		7	–	4	–	0
Army		–		5	–	3	–	0
Brown		–		6	–	4	–	0
Franklin & Marshall		–		6	–	4	–	0
Holy Cross		–		4	–	3	–	1
Rutgers		–		5	–	4	–	0
Tufts		–		5	–	4	–	0
Fordham		–		4	–	4	–	0
Villanova		–		3	–	3	–	0
Lafayette		–		4	–	5	–	1
Syracuse		–		4	–	5	–	0
Carnegie Tech		–		3	–	4	–	1
New Hampshire		–		3	–	4	–	1
Vermont		–		3	–	5	–	0
Pittsburgh		–		3	–	6	–	0
Boston College		–		2	–	4	–	1
Cornell		–		3	–	7	–	0
NYU		–		2	–	6	–	0

The 1912 Penn Quakers football team was an American football team that represented the University of Pennsylvania in the 1912 college football season. In their fourth and final season under head coach Andy Smith, the Quakers compiled a 7–4 record and outscored opponents by a total of 191 to 106. Fullback Leroy Mercer was selected as a first-team All-American by Walter Camp.

== Schedule ==
Date	Opponent	Site	Result	Attendance	Source
September 28	Gettysburg	Franklin Field; Philadelphia, PA	W 25–0		
October 2	Franklin & Marshall	Franklin Field; Philadelphia, PA	W 35–0		
October 5	Dickinson	Franklin Field; Philadelphia, PA	W 16–0		
October 9	Ursinus	Franklin Field; Philadelphia, PA	W 34–0		
October 12	Swarthmore	Franklin Field; Philadelphia, PA	L 3–6		
October 19	at Brown	Andrews Field; Providence, RI	L 7–30		
October 26	Lafayette	Franklin Field; Philadelphia, PA	L 3–7		
November 2	Penn State	Franklin Field; Philadelphia, PA	L 0–14		
November 9	Michigan	Franklin Field; Philadelphia, PA	W 27–21	15,000	
November 16	Carlisle	Franklin Field; Philadelphia	W 34–26		
November 28	Cornell	Franklin Field; Philadelphia, PA (rivalry)	W 7–2		
