= 1912 Boston College football team =

American college football season

1912 Boston College football
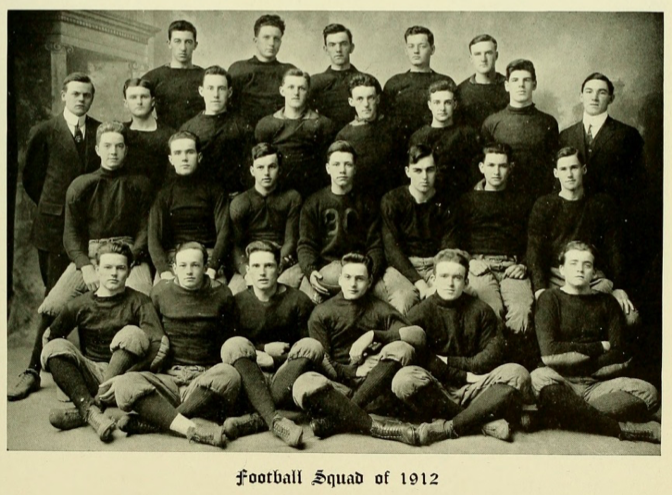
- Conference: Independent
- Record: 2–4–1
- Head coach: William Joy (1st season)
- Captain: John Hartigan

1912 Eastern college football independents records
	Conf.			Overall
Team	W	L	T	W		L		T
Harvard		–		9	–	0	–	0
Penn State		–		8	–	0	–	0
Carlisle		–		12	–	1	–	1
Princeton		–		7	–	1	–	1
Swarthmore		–		7	–	1	–	1
Yale		–		7	–	1	–	1
Lehigh		–		9	–	2	–	0
Dartmouth		–		7	–	2	–	0
Wesleyan		–		7	–	2	–	0
Colgate		–		5	–	2	–	0
Washington & Jefferson		–		8	–	3	–	1
Rhode Island State		–		6	–	3	–	0
Bucknell		–		6	–	3	–	1
Temple		–		3	–	2	–	0
Penn		–		7	–	4	–	0
Army		–		5	–	3	–	0
Brown		–		6	–	4	–	0
Franklin & Marshall		–		6	–	4	–	0
Holy Cross		–		4	–	3	–	1
Rutgers		–		5	–	4	–	0
Tufts		–		5	–	4	–	0
Fordham		–		4	–	4	–	0
Villanova		–		3	–	3	–	0
Lafayette		–		4	–	5	–	1
Syracuse		–		4	–	5	–	0
Carnegie Tech		–		3	–	4	–	1
New Hampshire		–		3	–	4	–	1
Vermont		–		3	–	5	–	0
Pittsburgh		–		3	–	6	–	0
Boston College		–		2	–	4	–	1
Cornell		–		3	–	7	–	0
NYU		–		2	–	6	–	0

The 1912 Boston College football team was an American football team that represented Boston College as an independent during the 1912 college football season. Led by first-year head coach William Joy, Boston College compiled a record of 2–4–1.

== Schedule ==
Date	Opponent	Site	Result	Source
October 5	at Fordham	Fordham Field; Bronx, NY	L 0–14	
October 12	at Massachusetts	Alumni Field; Amherst, MA (rivalry)	L 0–42	
October 19	at Colby	Waterville, ME	L 0–55	
October 26	at Cushing Academy	Ashburnham, MA	T 6–6	
November 2	at Dean Academy	Franklin, MA	L 7–40	
November 16	at Connecticut	Athletic Fields; Storrs, CT	W 13–0	
November 28	at Saint Anselm	Manchester, NH	W 7–0	
