= 1912 Pittsburgh Panthers football team =

American college football season

1912 Pittsburgh Panthers football
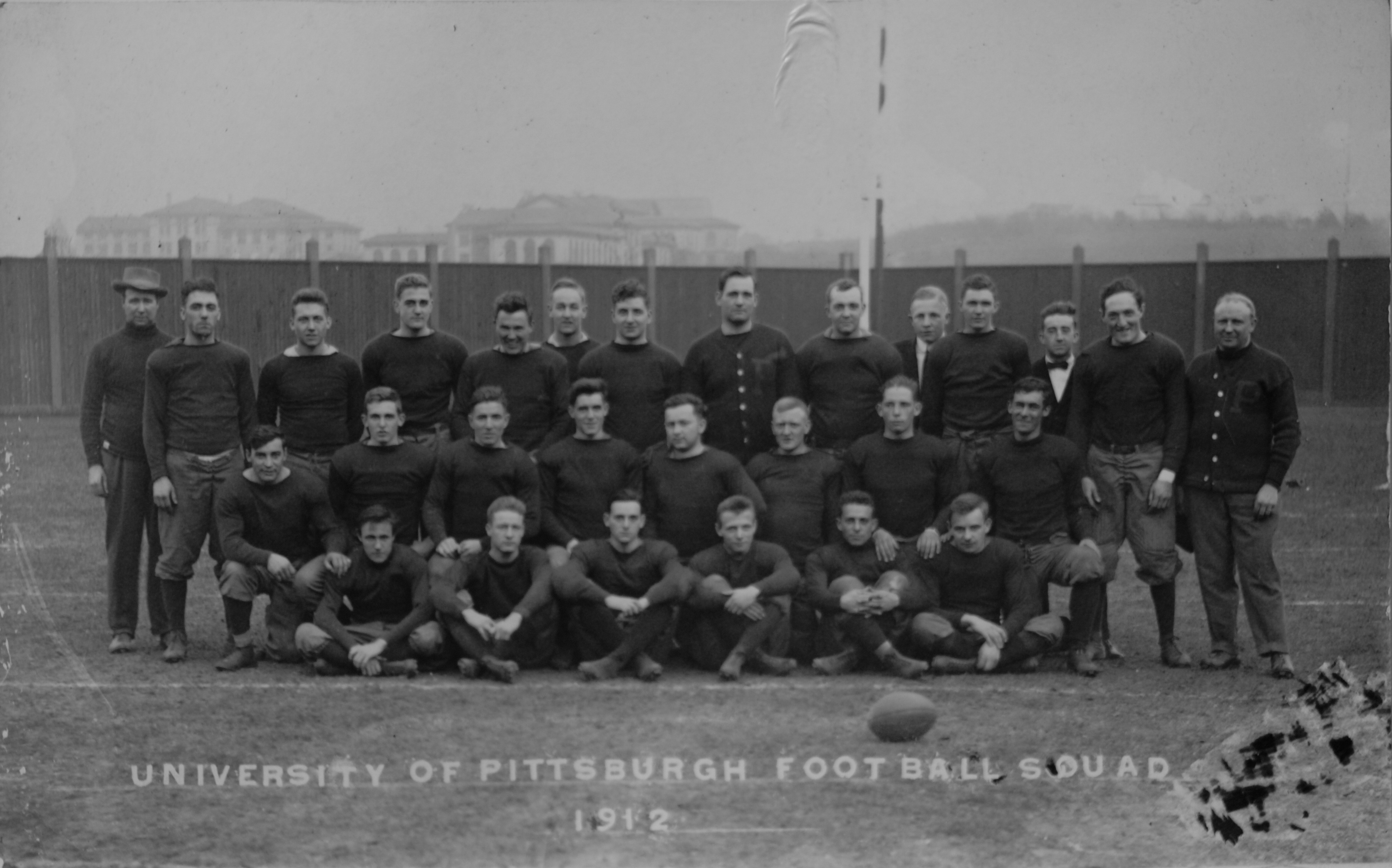
- Conference: Independent
- Record: 3–6
- Head coach: Joseph H. Thompson (4th season)
- Captain: Polly Galvin
- Home stadium: Forbes Field

1912 Eastern college football independents records
	Conf.			Overall
Team	W	L	T	W		L		T
Harvard		–		9	–	0	–	0
Penn State		–		8	–	0	–	0
Carlisle		–		12	–	1	–	1
Princeton		–		7	–	1	–	1
Swarthmore		–		7	–	1	–	1
Yale		–		7	–	1	–	1
Lehigh		–		9	–	2	–	0
Dartmouth		–		7	–	2	–	0
Wesleyan		–		7	–	2	–	0
Colgate		–		5	–	2	–	0
Washington & Jefferson		–		8	–	3	–	1
Rhode Island State		–		6	–	3	–	0
Bucknell		–		6	–	3	–	1
Temple		–		3	–	2	–	0
Penn		–		7	–	4	–	0
Army		–		5	–	3	–	0
Brown		–		6	–	4	–	0
Franklin & Marshall		–		6	–	4	–	0
Holy Cross		–		4	–	3	–	1
Rutgers		–		5	–	4	–	0
Tufts		–		5	–	4	–	0
Fordham		–		4	–	4	–	0
Villanova		–		3	–	3	–	0
Lafayette		–		4	–	5	–	1
Syracuse		–		4	–	5	–	0
Carnegie Tech		–		3	–	4	–	1
New Hampshire		–		3	–	4	–	1
Vermont		–		3	–	5	–	0
Pittsburgh		–		3	–	6	–	0
Boston College		–		2	–	4	–	1
Cornell		–		3	–	7	–	0
NYU		–		2	–	6	–	0

The 1912 Pittsburgh Panthers football team was an American football team that represented the University of Pittsburgh as an independent during the 1912 college football season. In its fourth and final season under head coach Joseph H. Thompson, the team compiled a 3–6 record and was outscored by a total of 122 to 113.

== Schedule ==
Date	Opponent	Site	Result	Attendance	Source
September 28	Ohio Northern	D.C. & A.C. Park; Wilkinsburg, PA	W 22–0		
October 5	Westminster (PA)	Forbes Field; Pittsburgh, PA	W 13–3		
October 12	Bucknell	Forbes Field; Pittsburgh, PA	L 0–6		
October 19	Carlisle	Forbes Field; Pittsburgh, PA	L 8–45	10,000	
October 26	at Navy	Worden Field; Annapolis, MD	L 6–13	3,000	
November 2	Notre Dame	Forbes Field; Pittsburgh, PA (rivalry)	L 0–3		
November 9	University of Maryland, Baltimore	Forbes Field; Pittsburgh, PA	W 64–0		
November 16	Washington & Jefferson	Forbes Field; Pittsburgh, PA	L 0–13	12,000–20,000	
November 28	Penn State	Forbes Field; Pittsburgh, PA (rivalry)	L 0–38	15,000	

== Preseason ==
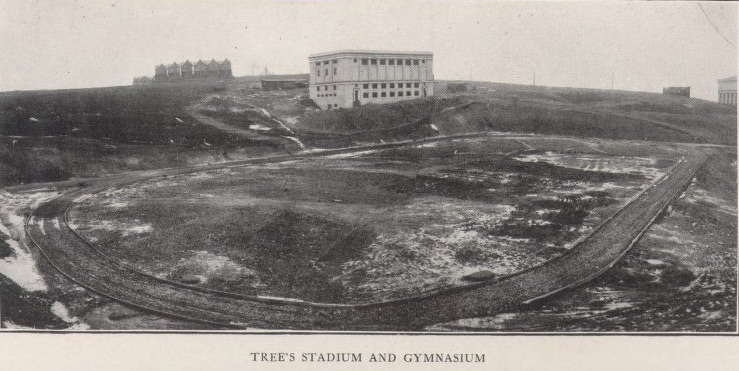
University of Pittsburgh Trees Stadium and Gymnasium, spring 1912

The University of Pittsburgh athletic program was bolstered by the financial success of the previous two years of football. The 1911 record was not as great as the 1910 record, but the schedule that Laurence Hurst put together generated a lot of fan interest. Similarly, the 1912 schedule had five "hard" home games – Bucknell, Carlisle, Notre Dame, W. & J., and Penn State.

The Trees Stadium and Gymnasium were completed and put to use by the football team. Practice was held on the stadium grounds and the players utilized the locker room facilities in the adjacent Gymnasium. A "training house, where the regulars will be accommodated when the first squad was picked, was located on Dawson street." A freshman team was organized by Athletic Director Charles Miller.

Ralph "Polly" Galvin was chosen Captain of the 1912 team at the season ending banquet. Joseph Thompson returned for a fourth year as head coach even though he aspired to be a state senator.

The first game versus Ohio Northern was played at D. C. & A. C. Park in Wilkinsburg and the remaining home games were played on Forbes Field.

It should be mentioned important rule changes were instituted for the 1912 season that had a lasting and positive effect on the game as we now know it. 1) The playing field was reduced to 100 yards with a 10-yard end zone. 2) A team had four downs to advance 10 yards and make a first down. 3) A touchdown counted six points. 4) A forward pass could be thrown any distance. 5) The onside kick from a scrimmage play was eliminated. 5) The kickoff was put in play from the 40-yard line.

== Coaching staff ==
1912 Pittsburgh Panthers football staff
Coaching staff: Joseph H. Thompson – Head coach; Floyd Rose – Assistant backfield coach; Alexander Stevenson – Assistant line coach	Support staff: Laurence Hurst – Graduate manager of athletics; Charles S. Miller – Director of athletics

== Roster ==
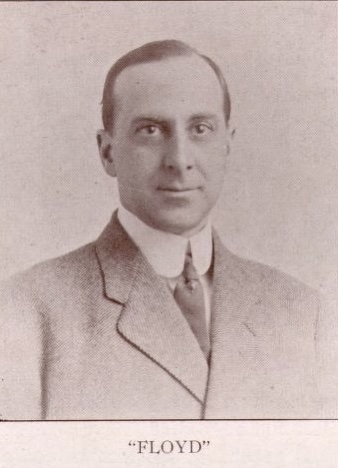
Floyd Rose - 1912 University of Pittsburgh Assistant football coach

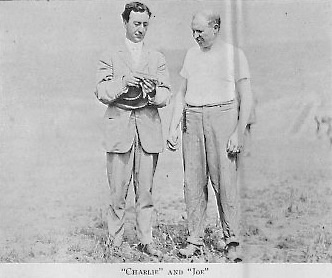
Coach Joe Thompson and Athletic Director Charles Miller

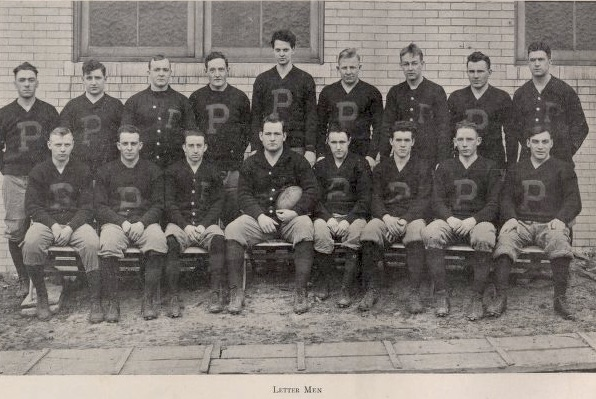

1912 Pittsburgh Panthers football roster
Player	Position	Games	Height	Weight	Class	Prep School	Degree	Residence
Ralph Galvin^	center	5	6' 0"	235	1913	New Brighton H.S.	Doctor of Dental Surgery	New Brighton, PA
Hube Wagner^	end	9	5' 11"	185	1914	Monaca H.S.	Doctor of Medicine	Monaca, PA
Frank Corboy^	halfback	9	5' 10"	170	1916	Altoona H.S.	Associate Pharmacy	Allentown, PA
Philip Dillon^	halfback	9	5' 7"	170	1916	Bellefonte Academy	Associate Mining	Ellsworth, PA
Francis Joyce^	end	7	5' 11"	153	1916	Pittsburgh Academy	Associate Medical	Pittsburgh, PA
Fred Ward^	halfback	9	5' 7"	150	1916	New Kensington H.S.	Doctor of Dental Surgery	Beaver Falls, PA
Wayne Smith^	guard	9	5' 9"	200	1915	Bellefonte Academy	Doctor of Dental Surgery	Pittsburgh, PA
William Connelly^	quarterback	5	5' 5"	140	1913	New Haven H.S.	B.A. '13/Assoc. Law '16	New Haven, CT
Enoch Pratt^	guard	7	6' 4"	215	1914	Pittsburgh H.S.	Associate Engineering	Pittsburgh, PA
Roy Kernohan^	halfback	4	5' 11"	168	1915	Homestead H.S.	Doctor of Dental Surgery	Homestead, PA
Charles Reese^	end	8	6' 1"	180	1915	Bellefonte Academy	Doctor of Dental Surgery	Warren, PA
Isadore Shapira^	center	8	5' 10"	180	1916	East Liberty Academy	B. S. in Economics	Pittsburgh, PA
Justice Egbert^	end	9	6' 0"	160	1916	East Liberty Academy	Associate Engineering	Pittsburgh, PA
Harry Shof^	quarterback	9	5' 7"	150	1916	Greensburg Seminary	Assoc. College '16/Assoc. Medical 1918	
Carl Hockensmith^	center	5	5' 11"	220	1916	The Kiski School	Associate Engineering	Penn Station, PA
William McEllroy^	quarterback	8	5' 10"	135	1914	Edgewood H.S.	Bachelor of Science	Edgewood Park, PA
Mark Hoag^	tackle	7	5' 11"	175	1914	Holy Cross Prep	Doctor of Dental Surgery	Lock Haven, PA
William Leahy^	guard	9	5' 10"	210	1914	Allegheny H.S.	enrolled in Dental School	
John Blair^	tackle	7	5' 9"	185	1916	Indiana Normal	enrolled in Dental School	
George Gehlert	guard	3	5' 11"	205	1913	Villa Nova Prep	Doctor of Dental Surgery	Hannah, ND
Harry Blumenthal	end	3	5' 8"	160	1916	East Liberty Academy	Associate Economics	Etna, PA
Mont Sanderson	halfback	4	5' 6"	160	1916	Butler H.S.	Doctor of Dental Surgery	Butler, PA
Samuel Kipp	end	4	6' 0"	158	1913	Carnegie H.S.	B. S. in Civil Engineering	Bellevue, PA
James Hemphill	tackle	1	5' 8"	168	1914	Duquesne H.S.	B. S. in Mechanical Engineering	Duquesne, PA
William McKinney	guard	1			1914		B. A. & B. S. 1914/ Masters of Arts 1916	Pittsburgh, PA
John Winters	end	2			1916	Barnesville H.S.	Associate Economics	Barnesville, OH
Raymond Collins	end	1			1915		Associate Economics	East Pittsburgh, Pa
Malcolm Smith	halfback	2				Indiana Normal	enrolled in Dental School	
^ Lettermen

== Game summaries ==
=== Ohio Northern ===
Week 1: Ohio Northern at Pitt

Team	1	2	3	4	Total
Ohio Northern	0	0	0	0	0
• Pitt	12	0	3	7	22

- Date: September 28, 1912
- Location: D. C. & A. C. Park
  Pittsburgh, PA
- Game start: 3:00 p.m.
- Referee: Ewing Rafferty (Princeton)

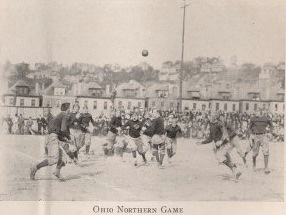
1912 Pitt versus Ohio Northern Football game action

"The Pitt football team inaugurated its 1912 season yesterday in Wilkinsburg by beating the Ohio Northern eleven 22–0." This was the fifth meeting between these two schools and Pitt now led the series 5–0, outscoring the Polar Bears 112–0.

Pitt's lineup had four returning starters from the 1911 team – Galvin, Wagner, Leahy and Pratt. The other seven positions were filled by new men, "who made names for themselves at nearby high or preparatory schools." Coach Thompson used twenty-four men in the game to find his weak spots and determine who should be a varsity player.

After a few exchanges of punts, the Pitt offense advanced the ball methodically downfield with line rushes. Chuck Reese, Harry Shof and Frank Corboy "took it up the line and Corboy bucked it over." Ralph Galvin missed the extra point. On Pitt's next possession Hube Wagner caught a touchdown pass from William McEllroy for the second touchdown. Galvin was again unsuccessful on the point after. The Pitt quarterbacks completed four of eight passes in this game. Coach Thompson made wholesale substitutions for the second quarter. The surprising shift was putting center Ralph Galvin at fullback. Carl Hockensmith replaced Galvin at center. Pitt recovered a fumble deep in Ohio territory and Fred Ward kicked a field goal. The halftime score was 15 to 0.

"The third quarter was one of experiment on Pitt's part and desperate endeavor for the visitors." It was a punting duel with no scoring. The fourth quarter was the same story until with less than two minutes to play, McEllroy threw a 40 yard scoring pass to Hube Wagner, "who was easily the star of the contest." Galvin made the point after and Pitt won 22 to 0.

The Pitt lineup for the game against Ohio Northern was Hube Wagner, Sam Kipp and Roy Collins (left end), John Blair and William Dunn (left tackle), William Leahy and Mark Hoag (left guard), Ralph Galvin and Carl Hockensmith (center), Wayne Smith and George Gehlert (right guard), Enoch Pratt and Isadore Shapira (right tackle), Justice Egbert and Harry Blumenthal (right end), William McEllroy and Fred Ward (quarterback), Harry Shof, Mont Sanderson and Philip Dillon (left halfback), Frank Corboy and John Winters (right halfback), and Chuck Reese, Ralph Galvin and Roy Kernohan (fullback). The game consisted of twelve-minute quarters.

=== Westminster ===
Week 2: Westminster at Pitt

Team	1	2	3	4	Total
Westminster	0	0	3	0	3
• Pitt	7	0	0	6	13

- Date: October 5, 1912
- Location: Forbes Field
  Pittsburgh, PA
- Game start: 3:00 p.m.
- Referee: D. W. Merriman (Geneva)

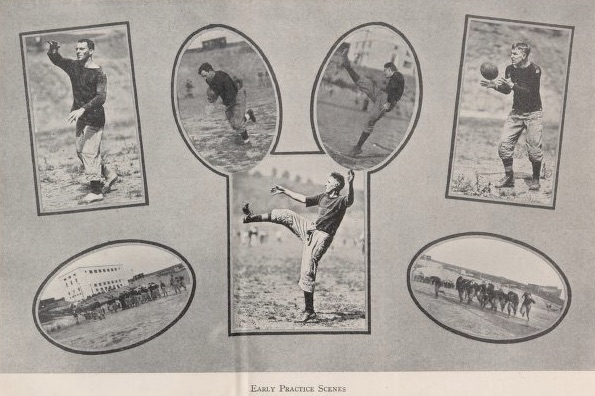
1912 University of Pittsburgh preseason football practice photos

The Westminster College football team came to Forbes Field on October 5 in search of their first victory over the University of Pittsburgh eleven. Their record versus Pitt was 0–8–2 and they had been outscored 157–28.

The Pittsburgh Press wrote: "With big "Polly" Galvin on the hospital list and "Red" Smith, one of the three veteran players starting the game, banished to the side lines in the first few minutes of play, University of Pittsburgh had all kinds of trouble with the aggressive Westminster College eleven in their annual gridiron engagement on Forbes Field."

Early in the first period William McEllroy fumbled a punt and Westminster recovered on the Pitt seventeen yard line. The Pitt defense held and Westminster quarterback Buckley's field goal try missed. The Pitt offense capitalized with McEllroy completing a 40 yard pass to Hube Wagner. Then "consistent gains by Reese, Shof and Wagner carried the ball to the six yard line, and McEllroy tossed the ball to Wagner, who, in some mysterious manner had taken a position behind the goal line, and the first touchdown was recorded. Corboy kicked the goal and the score stood 7-0."

In the second quarter the Westminster offense advanced the ball into Pitt territory but finally lost the ball on downs. The Pitt offense "got their attack organized" with Philip Dillon racing 38 yards to the visitors 2-yard line as time was called to end the half.

Westminster had the ball in Pitt territory for most of the third quarter. They advanced the ball to the 5-yard line but were unable to score. At the start of the fourth period they had the ball on Pitt's 15-yard line. On first down Westminster halfback Cannon was thrown for an eight yard loss by Fred Ward. "With the ball on the 23-yard line, Buckley kicked a beautiful drop, and the Westminster contingent made themselves heard for the first time." Pitt 7 to Westminster 3.

In the fourth quarter, "With defeat staring them in the face, the Pitt backfield started to show some signs of aggressiveness and the Westminster eleven was kept in hot water all the time defending their goal." A series of line bucks and a 37 yard dash by Dillon put the ball in scoring territory but Ward missed the field goal. Westminster advanced the ball to the 41-yard line and turned it over on downs. Dillon dashed 38 yards to the three. McEllroy replaced Ward at quarterback and promptly threw a touchdown pass to Hube Wagner for the score. Pitt failed to kick goal. The final score read Pitt 13 to Westminster 3. Westminster would finish the season with a 3–6 record.

The Pittsburg Press noted: "Joe Thompson was in anything but a good humor after the game. "The fellows played like a bunch of novices." he said."

The Pitt lineup for the game against Westminster was Hube Wagner (left end), John Blair (left tackle), William Leahy (left guard), Carl Hockensmith (center), Wayne Smith, George Gehlert and Isadore Shapira (right guard), Mark Hoag and Enoch Pratt (right tackle), Harry Blumenthal and Justice Egbert (right end), William McEllroy, Fred Ward and William Connelly (quarterback), Frank Corboy and Philip Dillon (left halfback), Harry Shof and Mont Sanderson (right halfback) and Chuck Reese, Malcolm Smith and Roy Kernohan (fullback). The game consisted of ten-minute quarters.

=== Bucknell ===
Week 3: Bucknell at Pitt

Team	1	2	3	4	Total
• Bucknell	0	0	0	6	6
Pitt	0	0	0	0	0

- Date: October 12, 1912
- Location: Forbes Field
  Pittsburgh, PA
- Game start: 3:00 p.m.
- Referee: William F. Knox (Yale)

On October 12 the Bucknell football team led by coach Byron W. Dickson arrived at Forbes Field to try to earn their first victory over the University of Pittsburgh eleven. Their wish was granted as the "University of Pittsburgh met its Waterloo at Forbes Field yesterday afternoon when the well trained and speedy Bucknell University eleven trounced "Joe" Thompson's pets to the tune of 6–0."

Bucknell gained their first possession on the Pitt 40-yard line. On first down they lost five yards for an offside penalty. On second down quarterback Cruikshank "tossed the ball and it came down in the arms of Sturgis" on the Pitt 4-yard line. The Pitt defense held and took over on downs. Frank Carboy punted and Cruikshank returned the ball to the Pitt 38-yard line. Cruikshank passed to Jordan who was tackled on the 3-yard line, but moved the ball over the goal line. A five yard penalty moved the ball back to the eight. The Pitt defense held again and punted out of danger. The first quarter ended with Bucknell in possession in their own territory.

Early in the second quarter the Bison advanced the ball to the Pitt 2-yard line. On fourth down Bucknell fullback "Topham had the ball but Hube Wagner got back of the line and tackled him for a loss of three yards." The rest of the half was a punting duel.

Pitt's first possession of the third quarter started on Bucknell's 14-yard line. Four running plays gained four yards and it was Bucknell's ball. The teams traded interceptions and resumed the punting duel. Early in the fourth quarter William Connelly intercepted a Cruikshank pass and dashed seventy yards for a touchdown. According to head linesman Cozzens, Pitt was offside and the play called back. Fumbling, punting and penalties ensued. Bucknell gained possession with less than two minutes remaining at midfield. Cruikshank completed a pass to his end Jordan on the 40-yard line, and the Bucknell captain was not brought down until he reached the 7-yard line. On first down Cruikshank passed to Jordan in the end zone for the touchdown. The point after was unsuccessful and Bucknell led 6–0. The game ended after the next play. Bucknell would finish the season with a 6–3–1 record.

"The Blue and Gold was outplayed during almost the entire contest." Bucknell was 11-17 passing and gained nine first downs. Pitt gained two first downs, fumbled 6 times and punted fourteen times. The Pitt quarterbacks were 4–11 passing with no yards gained.

Coach Thompson stated:

"We were beaten by a team that played better football, and while I maintain that Connelly's run scored us a touchdown, everything is over and we can't change matters. Cozzens positively did not blow his whistle declaring the offside play at all and seemed to arrive at the decision after the ball was over the line. It also looked from where I was standing as though the Bucknell man receiving the pass which scored their touchdown got the ball after it went over the line. The defeat will wake us all up and we will come back, mark my word.... If W. & J. and State think they have us licked they have another guess coming. We will take a dozen beatings like today's to defeat them."

The Pitt lineup for the game against Bucknell was Hube Wagner and Francis Joyce (left end), John Blair (left tackle), William Leahy (left guard), Ralph Galvin (center), Wayne Smith (right guard), Carl Hockensmith (right tackle), Mark Hoag and Justice Egbert (right end), William McEllroy, William Connelly and Fred Ward (quarterback), Malcolm Smith (left halfback), Harry Shof and Philip Dillon (right halfback) and Frank Corboy (fullback). The game consisted of fifteen-minute quarters.

=== Carlisle ===
Week 4: Carlisle at Pitt

Team	1	2	3	4	Total
• Carlisle	7	14	7	17	45
Pitt	0	0	8	0	8

- Date: October 19, 1912
- Location: Forbes Field
  Pittsburgh, PA
- Game start: 3:00 p.m.
- Game attendance: 10,000
- Referee: Frank S. Bergin (Princeton)

The Pittsburg Press reported: "Playing an article of football that surprised even their most ardent admirers, Glenn Warner's Carlisle Indian squad swooped down on Pitt yesterday at Forbes Field and made their escape with another scalp."

The Pittsburgh Sunday Post was more succinct: "Beaten, but not humbled."

And Richard Guy of The Gazette Times summed it up best: "The University of Pittsburgh football team showed its best form of the season yesterday afternoon at Forbes Field, but despite this improvement it was outclassed by the Indians from Carlisle. The Redskins played great football in spots and at times very ragged football, but they left the field at the expiration of 60 minutes of work with the score 45–8 in their favor." Carlisle scored six touchdowns, six extra points and one field goal. Pitt scored one touchdown and a safety.

Early in the first quarter Pitt advanced the ball to the Carlisle 15-yard line. The Carlisle defense held and Ralph Galvin missed a 25 yard field goal. Five plays later Jim Thorpe, "in his own inimitable manner, ran 55 yards for a touchdown and kicked goal." In the second period Carlisle advanced the ball to the Pitt 3-yard line. Jim Thorpe fumbled and Pitt recovered. Pitt punted out of bounds on their 28-yard line. On second down "Welch got behind the phalanx interference and ran 32 yards for a touchdown. Thorpe kicked goal." The Carlisle offense came right back down the field to the Pitt eleven. Thorpe, Gus Welch and Goesback each made more than 10 yards per carry on the drive. After an offside penalty moved the ball back to the fifteen, "Welch slipped past Pitt's right end for 15 yards and a touchdown. Thorpe kicked the goal." Carlisle led at halftime 21 to 0.

Pitt received the second half kickoff and Hube Wagner threw an interception. On first down Jim Thorpe "slipped past Pitt's left end like a shadow for a 40 yard run ending behind the goal line. He then kicked goal." Galvin recovered Welch's fumble on the Carlisle 21-yard line. A pass from Wagner to Philip Dillon gained five yards. On second down the ball went from Connelly to Wagner and a pass to Galvin in the end zone for Pitt's touchdown. Galvin missed the point after. After a change of possessions Thorpe mishandled the center snap on a punt situation and the ball rolled into the end zone. Thorpe retrieved the ball but was tackled for a safety. The score was Carlisle 28 to Pitt 8. The Carlisle offense kept up the pressure and advanced the ball down the field and had fourth down on the Pitt one yard line when time was called at the end of the third period. Alex Arcasa replaced Goesback at halfback for Carlisle and scored two fourth quarter touchdowns. Jim Thorpe converted the goals after and later booted a 44 yard field goal to close out the scoring. Carlisle finished the season with a 12–1–1 record. Carlisle halfback Jim Thorpe and tackle Joe Guyon are in both the Pro Football Hall of Fame and College Football Hall of Fame. Quarterback Gus Welch is in the College Hall of Fame.

The Pitt lineup for the game against Carlisle was Francis Joyce and Justice Egbert (left end), Isadore Shapira and Enoch Pratt (left tackle), William Leahy (left guard), Ralph galvin (center), Wayne Smith (right guard), Carl Hockensmith and Chuck Reese (right tackle), Mark Hoag and Harry Blumenthal (right end), William Connelly, Fred Ward and William McEllroy (quarterback), Harry Shof and Philip Dillon (left halfback), Frank Corboy (right halfback) and Hube Wagner (fullback). The game consisted of fifteen-minute quarters.

=== At Navy ===
Week 5: Pitt at Navy

Team	1	2	3	4	Total
Pitt	6	0	0	0	6
• Navy	6	7	0	0	13

- Date: October 26, 1912
- Location: Worden Field
  Annapolis, MD
- Game start: 2:30 p.m.
- Game attendance: 3,000
- Referee: Charles A. Taussig (Cornell)

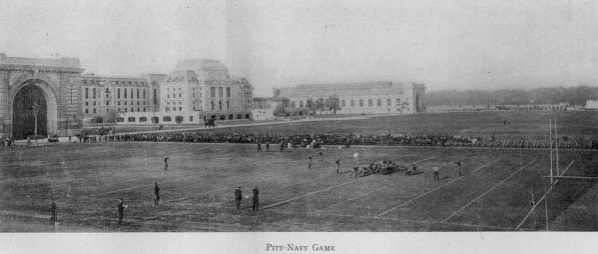
1912 Navy versus Pittsburgh football game scene at Worden Field

The only Pitt road game for the 1912 football season was against the Naval Academy in Annapolis. "This event marked the initial competition in any branch of sport between the two institutions." On Friday October 25, the team and students "pulled out of Union Station at 9:40 a.m. for Baltimore." They spent the night in Baltimore and went to Annapolis early Saturday morning. Like Pitt, Navy led by coach Douglas Legate Howard was on a two-game losing streak. Due to injuries sustained in the Carlisle game Pitt captain Ralph Galvin would not play against the Midshipmen.

Coach Thompson elaborated: "Galvin was badly laid up by Thorpe's tackle just as he crossed the Indians goal line for our touchdown last Saturday and we will positively not use him until the W. & J. game. I have faith in Hockensmith to fill the bill tomorrow, however, and do not figure that we will be a cinch for Annapolis. We have a squad of fighters and it is going to take more than two defeats to dishearten us."

Early in the first period Navy advanced the ball deep into Pitt territory and Carl Hockensmith was injured and had to be replaced by John Blair. Navy halfback Ingram took the ball to the five. The Pitt defense held for three downs and Pitt recovered a Navy fumble on fourth down. Wagner boomed a punt that Navy halfback Nichols fumbled and Pitt end Francis Joyce pounced on the ball in the end zone for a touchdown. Frank Carboy missed the point after. The Navy offense then advanced the ball, with Ingram and Nichols doing the bulk of the ground gains, to the Pitt 5-yard line. "Nichols carried the ball over for the touchdown." The point after failed and the score was tied at 6 to 6. Pitt quarterback William McEllroy was injured on the touchdown play and replaced by Harry Shof.

After an exchange of punts, an interception, and another exchange of punts the Midshipman had the ball on the Pitt 40-yard line. Four plays later they were on the Pitt ten. "Ingram tore through the Pitt defense like a bull and shaking off three or four tacklers, scored Navy's second touchdown. Brown kicked goal." The halftime score read Navy 13 to Pitt 6.

The second half was a defensive struggle as both teams dealt with fumbles, penalties and incomplete passes. Navy lined up for a field goal early in the third quarter but fumbled the snap and Pitt recovered. The Pitt offense could not sustain a scoring drive and lost their third straight game. "The game showed ragged spots in both teams, but was exceptionally clean, and the 3,000 spectators seemed to enjoy every minute of it." In spite of the loss and season ending injury to Carl Hockensmith, "the trip to Annapolis was a most enjoyable one for the Pitt players and students. Everyone was treated royally at all times. During the game every good play was applauded whether it was made by the home team or visitors. Fine accommodations were provided for the team in Bancroft Hall, the main dormitory building on campus. The field was the best on which the locals ever played."

The Pitt lineup for the game against Navy was Francis Joyce and Justice Egbert (left end), Isadore Shapira and Mark Hoag (left tackle), William Leahy and George Gehlert (left guard), Carl Hockensmith and John Blair (center), Wayne Smith (right guard), Enoch Pratt (right tackle), Chuck Reese (right end), William McEllroy, Fred Ward and Willian Connelly (quarterback), Fred Ward, Harry Shof and Philip Dillon (left halfback), Frank Carboy (right halfback), and Hube Wagner (fullback). The game consisted of fifteen-minute quarters.

=== Notre Dame ===
Week 6: Notre Dame at Pitt

Team	1	2	3	4	Total
• Notre Dame	0	0	0	3	3
Pitt	0	0	0	0	0

- Date: November 2, 1912
- Location: Forbes Field
  Pittsburgh, PA
- Game start: 2:30 p.m.
- Referee: George A. Sigman (Lafayette)

On November 2, the 1912 Notre Dame Fighting Irish football team, undefeated in their past fifteen games (12–0–3), came east to take on the University of Pittsburgh eleven. They were coached for the second year by John L. Marks, and their Captain was quarterback Gus Dorais. 1912 would be their first perfect season in history (7–0), out scoring their opponents 389–27. This was the third match-up between these two schools with Notre Dame winning 6–0 in 1909 and the game ended in a scoreless tie in 1911 . The Irish had a veteran team. "Ten of the eleven players who will take the field for them today were in the game last year against Pitt." The starting end on this team was Knute Rockne, who would go on to legendary fame as Notre Dame coach from 1918 to 1930. The Pitt lineup was minus starters: center Ralph Galvin, tackle Carl Hockensmith and quarterback William McEllroy. "The day was bitterly cold and a heavy snow fell throughout the afternoon."

The Pittsburgh Press reported:

"Coming here heralded as the greatest team in the entire west and making no attempt to conceal their belief that a score of at least 30 would be rolled up against coach "Joe" Thompson's youngsters, the Catholic footballers were glad to get away with a 3–0 victory."

The first three quarters were a defensive struggle with plenty of punts, fumbles and penalties. Pitt missed a field goal attempt by Fred Ward in the first period from forty plus yards. Notre Dame advanced the ball to the Pitt 15-yard line in the second quarter and fumbled. They regained possession and Irish quarterback Gus Dorais missed a 40 yard field goal. Notre Dame had the ball at the Pitt 16-yard line as time expired in the first half.

The second half mirrored the first as Pitt advanced the ball to the Notre Dame 9-yard line but the play was called back for a holding penalty. Gus Dorais missed a 36 yard field goal in the third quarter and a 40 yard try midway through the fourth quarter. After the miss, the Pitt offense could not gain a first down and Hube Wagner punted to Gus Dorais. He "returned 45 yards to the Pitt 15 yard line." The Irish ran three straight running plays for losses. Gus Dorais "then stepped back and kicked the winning field goal from the 35-yard line." In the final moments Roy Kernohan intercepted a pass on Pitt's 32-yard line. A pass from Hube Wagner to Chuck Reese gained 35 yards. A pass from Hube Wagner to Justice Egbert gained 11 more. Fred Ward replaced William Connelly at quarterback and attempted a 33 yard field goal that "went wide a foot." Pitt lost their fourth straight game 3 to 0.

The 1914 Pitt Owl had a positive report: "The Pitt team played more real football in the Notre Dame game than it did in all the other games on the schedule combined."

Notre Dame assistant coach Marks lauded Hube Wagner to The Pittsburgh Press: "That man is one of the greatest players I ever saw perform. I thought I had a world-beater in Eichenlaub, but I will admit that Wagner is even greater. He played wonderfully today. Talk about an All-American player. He should be handed a position without a contest."

The Pitt lineup for the game against Notre Dame was Chuck Reese (left end), Mark Hoag (left tackle), William Leahy (left guard), Isadore Shapira and John Blair (center), Wayne Smith (right guard), Enoch Pratt (right tackle), Francis Joyce and Justice Egbert (right end), Harry Shof, William Connelly and Fred Ward (quarterback), Fred Ward, Frank Carboy and Roy Kernohan (left halfback), Philip Dillon (right halfback) and Hube Wagner (fullback). The game was played in 15-minute quarters.

=== Maryland ===
Week 7: Maryland at Pitt

Team	1	2	3	4	Total
Maryland	0	0	0	0	0
• Pitt	19	14	0	31	64

- Date: November 9, 1912
- Location: Forbes Field
  Pittsburgh, PA
- Game start: 2:30 p.m.
- Referee: D. W. Merriman (Geneva)

On November 9, after their string of four straight losses, the Pitt eleven welcomed the University of Maryland team to Forbes Field. This would be the only game played between the two schools. (In 1912 the University of Maryland as we know it today was the Maryland Agricultural College. Today, this opponent is known as the University of Maryland, Baltimore.

The 1914 Owl Yearbook was brutally honest: "On November 9, an "almost football team," representing the University of Maryland appeared on Forbes Field as opponents for "Pittsburgh's hitherto-much beaten football team." The encounter was a regular farce as far as good football goes, the final tally being 64–0, against the southerners."

The Pittsburgh Daily Post's reporter Florent Gibson was more positive: "This is the story of the team that found itself. On a soggy field, playing in a light drizzle, before a few faithful supporters, the Pitt squad at last proved its right to be called a football team...The change can hardly be described, for the team consists of almost the same men. But the spirit is different. For the first time this season the Pitt players went into the game with the fiery determination that wins."

The Pitt starters scored nineteen points in the first quarter and fourteen in the second. Coach Thompson made wholesale substitutions for the third quarter and Pitt was unable to sustain any offense and did not score. The starters were reinserted into the game for the final quarter and scored thirty-one points. "It took nine touchdowns, seven resultant goals and one kick from placement to acquire the total." Hube Wagner scored four touchdowns, four goals after and one field goal to lead the Pitt scoring. Philip Dillon scored three touchdowns with Francis Joyce and Fred Ward each scoring one. Wayne Smith added three goals after. The highlight of the game was Hube Wagner's 90 -yard kick-off return for a touchdown late in the game. On the next kick-off Philip Dillon raced 95-yards to the end zone but the play was called back for an illegal block.

The lineup for Pitt in the game against Maryland was Chuck Reese and Sam Kipp (left end), Mark Hoag, John Blair and Lessin (left tackle), William Leahy (left guard), Isadore Shapira (center), Wayne Smith and William McKinney (right guard), Enoch Pratt and James Hemphill (right tackle), Francis Joyce and John Winters (right end), Harry Shof and William McEllroy (quarterback), Philip Dillon and Mont Sanderson (left halfback), Fred Ward and Frank Carboy (right halfback), and Hube Wagner and Justice Egbert (fullback). The game played in 15-minute quarters.

=== Washington & Jefferson ===
Week 8:W. & J. at Pitt

Team	1	2	3	4	Total
• W. & J.	0	0	6	7	13
Pitt	0	0	0	0	0

- Date: November 16, 1912
- Location: Forbes Field
  Pittsburgh, PA
- Game start: 2:30 p.m.
- Referee: M. V. Bergen Jr. (Princeton)

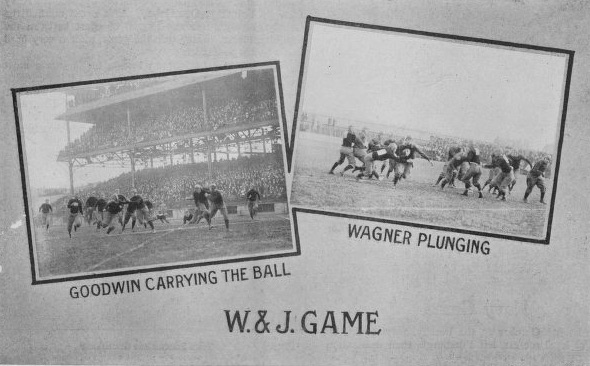

On November 16, the Washington & Jefferson Red and Black led by first-year coach Bob Folwell came into their 1912 game with Pitt sporting a 4–3–1 record. They had tied Carlisle, who handled Pitt 45–8, and lost to heavyweights Cornell, Yale and unbeaten Penn State. Pitt had beaten the Red and Black the past three years, but trailed 8–4 in all the previous games played.

The Gazette Times reported: "It was the biggest football day Pittsburgh has seen in years...Pitt lost (13–0) only after a good fight, and the 12,000 friends and foes who saw the blue and gold lose said it was an honorable defeat."

W. B. McVicker of The Pittsburgh Press wrote: "A more interesting game of football or one that was more bitterly fought, has not been seen in this city for years. Every man strove with might and main in every play and the result was that the 20,000 or more spectators who were present witnessed a contest that was well worth traveling miles to see."

The Pitt Weekly summed it up best: "Superior offense, superior defense, and superior luck were the main factors in the triumph of the Washington and Jefferson aggregation. We lost – we have no excuses to offer, but we played a good game."

Pitt squandered two scoring opportunities and the Red and Black capitalized on theirs. In the first quarter Pitt had first down on the W. & J. six yard line. "A touchdown looked imminent for Pitt, but the W. & J. warriors fought back like spartans." Three running plays gained nothing. Pitt halfback Fred Ward attempted a field goal but the center snap was fumbled and Pitt lost the ball on downs. In the third quarter, after the Red and Black had gone ahead 6–0, a wide open "Capt. Galvin fumbled a beautiful forward pass from Hube Wagner, and our second best chance to score went glimmering." Early in the third quarter Wash & Jeff recovered a Wagner fumble on the Pitt 38-yard line. On first down, halfback Goodwin "sent the W. and J. crowd almost wild by running to the Pitt 16-yard line." On second down, Goodwin raced around the Pitt left end and scored "the first touchdown by W. & J. against Pitt in two years." Red Fleming missed the goal and the Red and Black led 6–0. Late in the fourth quarter, W. & J. halfback Red Fleming intercepted a pass by Justice Egbert on the Pitt 30-yard line. On second down Goodwin threw the ball to "Alexander, who was standing unmolested on the Pitt six yard line. It was an easy matter for the W. & J. captain to run across the chalk line for a touchdown. Fleming kicked goal." The final score read W. & J. 13 to Pitt 0. Washington & Jefferson would finish the season with an 8–3–1 record.

Statistically, the Red and Black outgained Pittsburgh by 101 yards (307–206) and had 13 first downs to Pitt's 4. But the Red and Black fumbled eight times to four for Pitt. W. & J. was flagged 11 times and assessed 158 penalty yards. Pitt was penalized 5 times for 72 yards.

The Pittsburgh Sunday Post interviewed the coaches after the game. Coach Folwell boasted:

"My team did all that I could ask of it. The Red and Black had the game well in hand most of the time, and I am sure that every Washington and Jefferson man in the country feels proud of its performance in avenging the string of defeats inflicted by Pitt in past encounters."

Coach Thompson countered:

"We lost, so there's little use to talk about it. We weren't up to standard, but I am sure that my men never quit for an instant. They did their best, and in doing this they minimized the sting of defeat. But we will surely come back next year."

An interesting note about the final score of 13–0. All the newspapers reported the score as 14–0 in Sunday's editions. The Gazette Times noted in the Tuesday, November 19 issue: "Referee Bergen has been communicated with and states that only one (goal after) was negotiated." So, for the record books, the final score was 13–0.

The Pitt lineup for the game against Washington & Jefferson was Chuck Reese and Frank Corboy (left end), Mark Hoag and Isadore Shapira (left tackle), William Leahy (left guard), Ralph Galvin (center), Wayne Smith (right guard), Enoch Pratt (right tackle), Hube Wagner, Justice Egbert and Sam Kipp (right end), Harry Shof and William McEllroy (quarterback), Philip Dillon (left halfback), Fred Ward (right halfback) and Justice Egbert and Hube Wagner (fullback). The game was played in 15-minute quarters.

=== Penn State ===
Week 9:Penn State at Pitt

Team	1	2	3	4	Total
• Penn State	3	14	14	7	38
Pitt	0	0	0	0	0

- Date: November 28, 1912
- Location: Forbes Field
  Pittsburgh, PA
- Game start: 2:30 p.m.
- Referee: J. A. Evans (Williams)

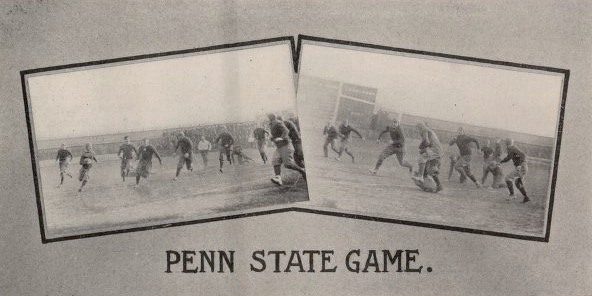

On Thanksgiving Day 1912 the Penn State football team visited Pittsburgh on a mission. The Nittanies were unbeaten at 7–0 and had out scored their opponents 247–6. They were led by coach Bill Hollenback who in three years had not yet lost a game. Penn State led the overall series with Pitt 9–3 in games played since 1900. The Lions lineup boasted three future College Hall Of Famers – Dexter Very, Pete Mauthe and Shorty Miller.

The Pitt lineup was healthy except for tackle Mark Hoag, who was injured in the W. & J. game, and guard William Leahy. Coach Thompson enlisted the aid of former players – Karl Dallenbach, and George Brown to prepare the squad for Penn State.

Florent Gibson of the Pittsburgh Daily Post wrote:

"Fulfilling the expectations of Blue and White adherents and the fears of Pittsburgh partisans, State came, State saw, and State conquered: score, State 38, Pitt 0. But the annual struggle between University of Pittsburgh gridders and the sterling warriors of Pennsylvania State College at Forbes Field yesterday afternoon cannot be dismissed with the same brevity that the old Roman general used in describing his conquests. Yesterday's conflict deserves a great deal more space than the deeds of Caesar, for it was "some" game."

Pete Mauthe, who won the 1911 game with his first quarter field goal, accounted for 20 of the Lions 38 points. He scored two touchdowns, five extra points and opened the scoring in the first quarter with a fifty-one yard field goal. He scored his touchdowns in the second quarter as the Pitt defense could not stop the Lion offense.

The Pitt offense advanced the ball in the third quarter and "Frank Corboy lost a touchdown for Pitt by not holding Wagner's hurl of a forward pass which he received across the State goal line." Galvin attempted a 50 yard field goal that "went amiss." Penn State gained possession and Pete Mauthe threw a 32 yard touchdown pass to Dexter Very. On first down after the kick-off, Hube Wagner's pass was intercepted by Punk Berryman and Penn State tacked on seven more points to lead 31 to 0 at the end of three quarters. The final score was made on a 16 yard run around end by Shorty Miller late in the fourth quarter.

Penn State finished the season 8–0 and was named co-National Champion by the National Championship Foundation an NCAA-designated major selector.

The Pitt lineup for the game against Penn State was Chuck Reese, Sam Kipp and William McEllroy (left end), John Blair and Isadore Shapira (left tackle), William Leahy (left guard), Ralph Galvin (center), Wayne Smith (right guard), Enoch Pratt (right tackle), Francis Joyce (right end), Harry Shof (quarterback), Frank Carboy, Fred Ward and Roy Kernohan (left halfback), Philip Dillon (right halfback) and Hube Wagner and Justice Egbert (fullback). The game was played in 15-minute quarters.

== Scoring summary ==
1912 Pittsburgh Panthers scoring summary
Player	Touchdowns	Extra points	Field goals	Safety	Points
Hube Wagner	8	4	1	0	55
Philip Dillon	3	0	0	0	18
Francis Joyce	2	0	0	0	12
Ralph Galvin	1	1	0	1	9
Fred Ward	1	0	1	0	9
Frank Corboy	1	1	0	0	7
Wayne Smith	0	3	0	0	3
Totals	16	9	2	1	113

== Postseason ==
Pitt finished the season with a 3–6 record in Coach Thompson's fourth and final year at the helm. His total record at Pitt was 22–11–2. He won the state senatorial election on November 5, 1912. After he was replaced as coach, he was named the Chairman of the Advisory Athletic Committee for the University.

John "Hube" Wagner was elected Captain of the 1913 Pitt football team at the year end banquet following the Penn State game. Additionally, Alfred R. Hamilton, an alumni member of the General Athletic Committee, offered the use of his farm to the team for the month of September for preseason practice. This yearly training period became known as "Camp Hamilton."

Laurence Hurst, Graduate Manager of Athletics since 1909, resigned his position in December 1912 so he could devote more time to his Law practice.
