= 1912 New Hampshire football team =

American college football season

1912 New Hampshire football
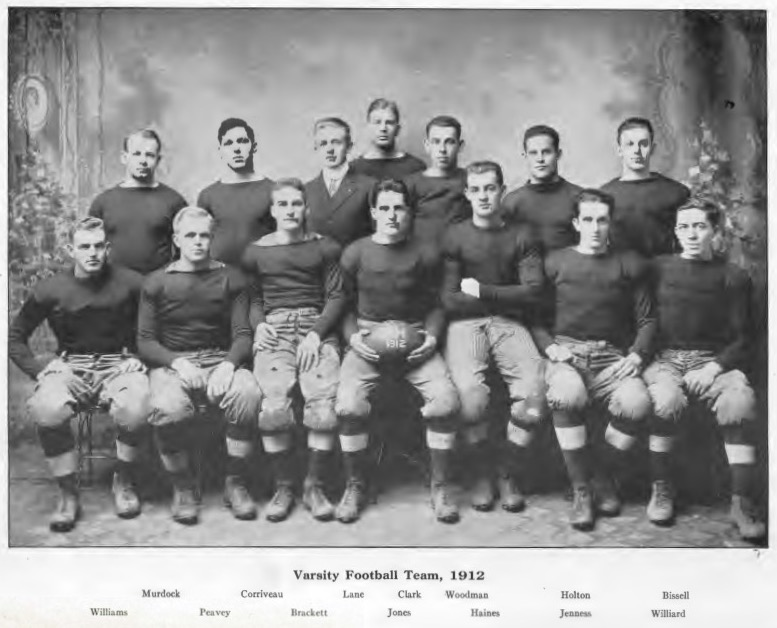
- Conference: Independent
- Record: 3–4–1
- Head coach: Tod Eberle (1st season)
- Assistant coach: John M. Jones (1st season)
- Captain: Philip C. Jones
- Home stadium: College grounds, Durham, NH

1912 Eastern college football independents records
	Conf.			Overall
Team	W	L	T	W		L		T
Harvard		–		9	–	0	–	0
Penn State		–		8	–	0	–	0
Carlisle		–		12	–	1	–	1
Princeton		–		7	–	1	–	1
Swarthmore		–		7	–	1	–	1
Yale		–		7	–	1	–	1
Lehigh		–		9	–	2	–	0
Dartmouth		–		7	–	2	–	0
Wesleyan		–		7	–	2	–	0
Colgate		–		5	–	2	–	0
Washington & Jefferson		–		8	–	3	–	1
Rhode Island State		–		6	–	3	–	0
Bucknell		–		6	–	3	–	1
Temple		–		3	–	2	–	0
Penn		–		7	–	4	–	0
Army		–		5	–	3	–	0
Brown		–		6	–	4	–	0
Franklin & Marshall		–		6	–	4	–	0
Holy Cross		–		4	–	3	–	1
Rutgers		–		5	–	4	–	0
Tufts		–		5	–	4	–	0
Fordham		–		4	–	4	–	0
Villanova		–		3	–	3	–	0
Lafayette		–		4	–	5	–	1
Syracuse		–		4	–	5	–	0
Carnegie Tech		–		3	–	4	–	1
New Hampshire		–		3	–	4	–	1
Vermont		–		3	–	5	–	0
Pittsburgh		–		3	–	6	–	0
Boston College		–		2	–	4	–	1
Cornell		–		3	–	7	–	0
NYU		–		2	–	6	–	0

The 1912 New Hampshire football team (Note: The school did not adopt the Wildcats nickname until February 1926; before then, they were generally referred to as "the blue and white".) was an American football team that represented New Hampshire College of Agriculture and the Mechanic Arts (Note: The school was often referred to as New Hampshire College or New Hampshire State College in newspapers of the era.) during the 1912 college football season—the school became the University of New Hampshire in 1923. Under first-year head coach Tod Eberle, the team finished with a record of 3–4–1.

== Schedule ==
During this era, teams played in the one-platoon system. This was the first season to use scoring values consistent with the present day: a touchdown was now worth six points (from 1898 through 1911, it had been worth five points), (Note: For additional detail, see Early history of American football#Scoring table.) while a conversion kick (extra point) and field goal remained unchanged at one point and three points, respectively.

Date	Opponent	Site	Result	Attendance	Source
September 21	Norwich	Durham, NH	T 0–0		
October 5	at Bates (Note: The Bates game ended after three quarters of play, by agreement of the teams, to allow the New Hampshire players time to catch their return train to Durham.)	Lewiston, ME	L 14–19		
October 12	at Tufts	Medford, MA	L 0–22		(Note: Some sources indicate the loss to Tufts was 23–0.)
October 19	at Worcester Tech	Worcester, MA	W 7–6		
October 26	Lowell Textile (Note: Lowell Textile is now University of Massachusetts Lowell.)	Durham, NH	W 19–0		
November 2	at Rhode Island State	Kingston, RI	L 0–25		
November 6	USS Washington	Durham, NH	W 6–0		(Note: The game against crew of the USS Washington was included in a season summary in The Granite yearbook. However, The New Hampshire described it as "a practice game with one of the battleships" in a recap of the season. (Washington, actually an armored cruiser, was at nearby Portsmouth Naval Shipyard in early November.) The New Hampshire later mentioned that the team's final two games of the season were against Rhode Island and Massachusetts, which further suggests the Washington match was considered a practice game.)
November 9	Massachusetts	Manchester, NH (rivalry)	L 3–21		(Note: The Massachusetts game recap appearing in The New Hampshire describes New Hampshire attempting some tackle-eligible plays.)

Coach Eberle was paid $500 ($16,681 in 2025) for the season.

== Team ==
The following 13 players were awarded varsity letters—their graduating classes are noted in parentheses:

- Ralph H. Bissell (1914, 2-year)
- William H. L. Brackett (1914)
- Byron H. Clark (1915)
- Paul E. Corriveau (Note: Corriveau was killed in action in France in 1918 while serving in the United States Marine Corps.) (1915)
- Ray E. Haines (1915)
- Horace G. Holton (1916)
- Augustine W. Jenness (1913)
- Philip C. Jones (1913)
- Armand L. Murdock (1915)
- Harold F. Peavey (1913)
- Daniel P. A. Willard (1913)
- Everett C. Williams (1913)
- Harold G. Woodman (1914, 2-year)

Manager: Gilbert F. Lane (also awarded a varsity letter)—class of 1913

Asst. managers: John E. Davis, Harold M. Eastman, and Lloyd S. Riford (Note: Father of New York politician Lloyd Stephen Riford Jr.)—class of 1914

The New Hampshire noted that current policy was to award varsity letters to the 13 players who played the most minutes in the team's final two games of the season (for this season: Rhode Island and Massachusetts), and also the team's student manager.
