= 1912 Washington & Jefferson Red and Black football team =

American college football season

1912 Washington & Jefferson Red and Black football
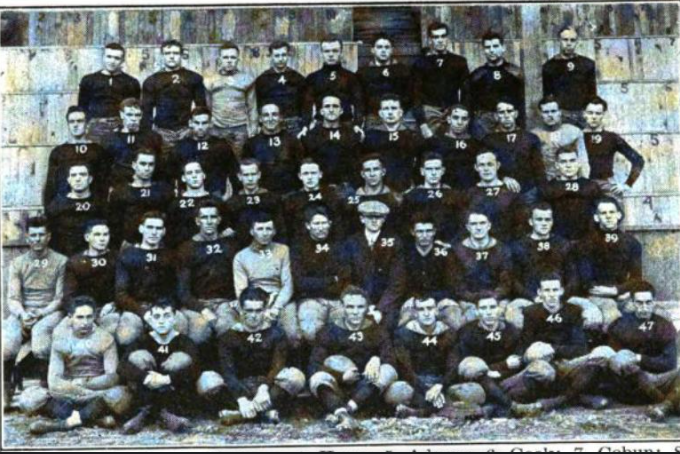
- Conference: Independent
- Record: 8–3–1
- Head coach: Bob Folwell (1st season)

1912 Eastern college football independents records
| | Conf. | | | Overall |
| Team | W | L | T | W | | L | | T |
|---|---|---|---|---|---|---|---|---|
| Harvard | | – | | 9 | – | 0 | – | 0 |
| Penn State | | – | | 8 | – | 0 | – | 0 |
| Carlisle | | – | | 12 | – | 1 | – | 1 |
| Princeton | | – | | 7 | – | 1 | – | 1 |
| Swarthmore | | – | | 7 | – | 1 | – | 1 |
| Yale | | – | | 7 | – | 1 | – | 1 |
| Lehigh | | – | | 9 | – | 2 | – | 0 |
| Dartmouth | | – | | 7 | – | 2 | – | 0 |
| Wesleyan | | – | | 7 | – | 2 | – | 0 |
| Colgate | | – | | 5 | – | 2 | – | 0 |
| Washington & Jefferson | | – | | 8 | – | 3 | – | 1 |
| Rhode Island State | | – | | 6 | – | 3 | – | 0 |
| Bucknell | | – | | 6 | – | 3 | – | 1 |
| Temple | | – | | 3 | – | 2 | – | 0 |
| Penn | | – | | 7 | – | 4 | – | 0 |
| Army | | – | | 5 | – | 3 | – | 0 |
| Brown | | – | | 6 | – | 4 | – | 0 |
| Franklin & Marshall | | – | | 6 | – | 4 | – | 0 |
| Holy Cross | | – | | 4 | – | 3 | – | 1 |
| Rutgers | | – | | 5 | – | 4 | – | 0 |
| Tufts | | – | | 5 | – | 4 | – | 0 |
| Fordham | | – | | 4 | – | 4 | – | 0 |
| Villanova | | – | | 3 | – | 3 | – | 0 |
| Lafayette | | – | | 4 | – | 5 | – | 1 |
| Syracuse | | – | | 4 | – | 5 | – | 0 |
| Carnegie Tech | | – | | 3 | – | 4 | – | 1 |
| New Hampshire | | – | | 3 | – | 4 | – | 1 |
| Vermont | | – | | 3 | – | 5 | – | 0 |
| Pittsburgh | | – | | 3 | – | 6 | – | 0 |
| Boston College | | – | | 2 | – | 4 | – | 1 |
| Cornell | | – | | 3 | – | 7 | – | 0 |
| NYU | | – | | 2 | – | 6 | – | 0 |

The 1912 Washington & Jefferson Red and Black football team represented Washington & Jefferson College as an independent during the 1912 college football season. Led by first-year head Bob Folwell, Washington & Jefferson compiled a record of 8–3–1.

== Schedule ==
| Date | Time | Opponent | Site | Result | Attendance | Source |
|---|---|---|---|---|---|---|
| September 21 | | at Cornell | Percy Field; Ithaca, NY | L 0–3 | | |
| September 28 | | Geneva | Washington, PA | W 52–7 | 3,000 | |
| October 5 | | Carlisle | Washington, PA | T 0–0 | 10,000 | |
| October 12 | | at Penn State | New Beaver Field; State College, PA | L 0–30 | 4,000 | |
| October 19 | | Carnegie Tech | Washington, PA | W 52–0 | | |
| October 26 | | at Yale | Yale Field; New Haven, CT | L 3–13 | | |
| November 2 | | Marietta | Washington, PA | W 34–0 | | |
| November 9 | | Western Reserve | Washington, PA | W 17–0 | | |
| November 16 | 2:30 p.m. | at Pittsburgh | Forbes Field; Pittsburgh, PA | W 13–0 | 12,000–20,000 | |
| November 23 | | Bethany (WV) | Washington, PA | W 67–0 | | |
| November 28 | | Bucknell | Washington, PA | W 22–7 | 5,000 | |
| November 30 | | at Staats Athletic Club | Wheeling, WV | W 33–0 | | |
