= 1912 Lafayette football team =

American football club

1912 Lafayette football
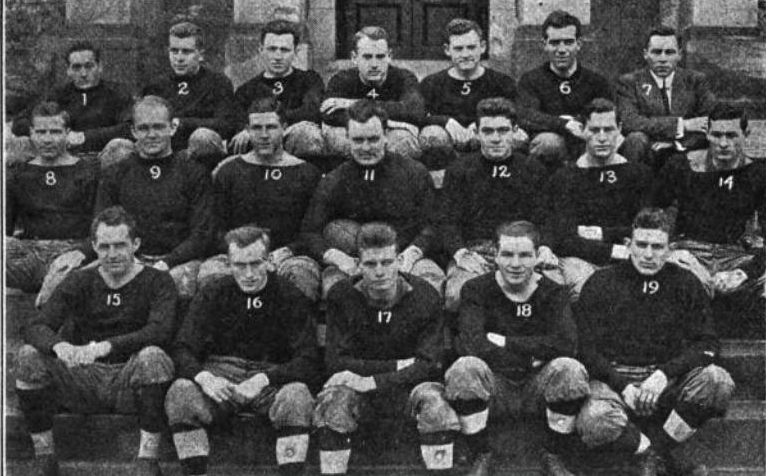
- Conference: Independent
- Record: 4–5–1
- Head coach: George McCaa (1st season)
- Captain: Howard Benson
- Home stadium: March Field

1912 Eastern college football independents records
	Conf.			Overall
Team	W	L	T	W		L		T
Harvard		–		9	–	0	–	0
Penn State		–		8	–	0	–	0
Carlisle		–		12	–	1	–	1
Princeton		–		7	–	1	–	1
Swarthmore		–		7	–	1	–	1
Yale		–		7	–	1	–	1
Lehigh		–		9	–	2	–	0
Dartmouth		–		7	–	2	–	0
Wesleyan		–		7	–	2	–	0
Colgate		–		5	–	2	–	0
Washington & Jefferson		–		8	–	3	–	1
Rhode Island State		–		6	–	3	–	0
Bucknell		–		6	–	3	–	1
Temple		–		3	–	2	–	0
Penn		–		7	–	4	–	0
Army		–		5	–	3	–	0
Brown		–		6	–	4	–	0
Franklin & Marshall		–		6	–	4	–	0
Holy Cross		–		4	–	3	–	1
Rutgers		–		5	–	4	–	0
Tufts		–		5	–	4	–	0
Fordham		–		4	–	4	–	0
Villanova		–		3	–	3	–	0
Lafayette		–		4	–	5	–	1
Syracuse		–		4	–	5	–	0
Carnegie Tech		–		3	–	4	–	1
New Hampshire		–		3	–	4	–	1
Geneva		–		3	–	4	–	0
Vermont		–		3	–	5	–	0
Pittsburgh		–		3	–	6	–	0
Boston College		–		2	–	4	–	1
Cornell		–		3	–	7	–	0
NYU		–		2	–	6	–	0

The 1912 Lafayette football team was an American football team that represented Lafayette College as an independent during the 1912 college football season. In its first season under head coach George McCaa, the team compiled an 4–5–1 record. Howard Benson was the team captain. The team played its home games at March Field in Easton, Pennsylvania.

== Schedule ==
Date	Opponent	Site	Result	Source
September 28	Muhlenberg	March Field; Easton, PA	W 20–3	
October 5	Swarthmore	March Field; Easton, PA	L 0–22	
October 12	at Yale	Yale Field; New Haven, CT	L 0–16	
October 19	Ursinus	March Field; Easton, PA	W 11–0	
October 26	at Penn	Franklin Field; Philadelphia, PA	W 7–3	
November 2	Bucknell	March Field; Easton, PA	T 0–0	
November 9	Syracuse	March Field; Easton, PA	L 7–30	
November 16	at Brown	Andrews Field; Providence, RI	L 7–21	
November 23	Lehigh	March Field; Easton, PA (rivalry)	L 0–7	
November 28	Dickinson	March Field; Easton, PA	W 19–13	
