= 1912 Brown Bears football team =

American college football season

1912 Brown Bears football
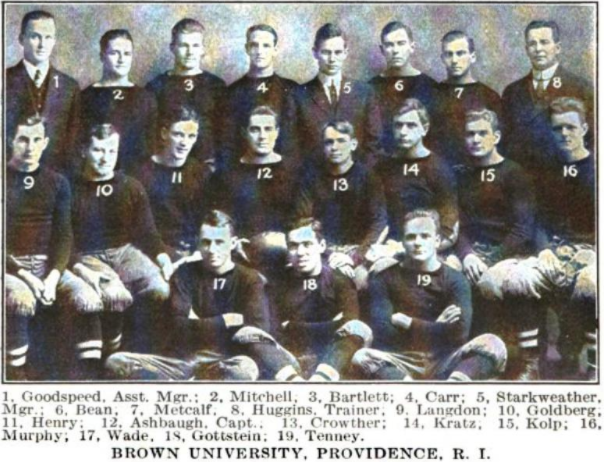
- Conference: Independent
- Record: 6–4
- Head coach: Edward N. Robinson (11th season)
- Home stadium: Andrews Field

1912 Eastern college football independents records
	Conf.			Overall
Team	W	L	T	W		L		T
Harvard		–		9	–	0	–	0
Penn State		–		8	–	0	–	0
Carlisle		–		12	–	1	–	1
Princeton		–		7	–	1	–	1
Swarthmore		–		7	–	1	–	1
Yale		–		7	–	1	–	1
Lehigh		–		9	–	2	–	0
Dartmouth		–		7	–	2	–	0
Wesleyan		–		7	–	2	–	0
Colgate		–		5	–	2	–	0
Washington & Jefferson		–		8	–	3	–	1
Rhode Island State		–		6	–	3	–	0
Bucknell		–		6	–	3	–	1
Temple		–		3	–	2	–	0
Penn		–		7	–	4	–	0
Army		–		5	–	3	–	0
Brown		–		6	–	4	–	0
Franklin & Marshall		–		6	–	4	–	0
Holy Cross		–		4	–	3	–	1
Rutgers		–		5	–	4	–	0
Tufts		–		5	–	4	–	0
Fordham		–		4	–	4	–	0
Villanova		–		3	–	3	–	0
Lafayette		–		4	–	5	–	1
Syracuse		–		4	–	5	–	0
Carnegie Tech		–		3	–	4	–	1
New Hampshire		–		3	–	4	–	1
Geneva		–		3	–	4	–	0
Vermont		–		3	–	5	–	0
Pittsburgh		–		3	–	6	–	0
Boston College		–		2	–	4	–	1
Cornell		–		3	–	7	–	0
NYU		–		2	–	6	–	0

The 1912 Brown Bears football team represented Brown University as an independent during the 1912 college football season. Led by 11th-year head coach Edward N. Robinson, Brown compiled a record of 6–4.

== Schedule ==
Date	Opponent	Site	Result	Attendance	Source
September 28	Colby	Andrews Field; Providence, RI	W 3–0		
October 5	Rhode Island State	Andrews Field; Providence, RI (rivalry)	W 14–0		
October 12	Wesleyan	Andrews Field; Providence, RI	L 6–7		
October 19	Penn	Andrews Field; Providence, RI	W 30–7		
October 26	at Harvard	Harvard Stadium; Boston, MA	L 10–30	> 15,000	
November 2	Vermont	Andrews Field; Providence, RI	W 12–7		
November 9	at Yale	Yale Field; New Haven, CT	L 0–10		
November 16	Lafayette	Andrews Field; Providence, RI	W 21–7		
November 23	Norwich	Andrews Field; Providence, RI	W 21–7		
November 28	Carlisle	Andrews Field; Providence, RI	L 0–32		
