= 1912 Vermont Green and Gold football team =

American college football season

1912 Vermont Green and Gold football
- Conference: Independent
- Record: 3–5
- Head coach: Earle T. Pickering (1st season)
- Home stadium: Centennial Field

1912 Eastern college football independents records
	Conf.			Overall
Team	W	L	T	W		L		T
Harvard		–		9	–	0	–	0
Penn State		–		8	–	0	–	0
Carlisle		–		12	–	1	–	1
Princeton		–		7	–	1	–	1
Swarthmore		–		7	–	1	–	1
Yale		–		7	–	1	–	1
Lehigh		–		9	–	2	–	0
Dartmouth		–		7	–	2	–	0
Wesleyan		–		7	–	2	–	0
Colgate		–		5	–	2	–	0
Washington & Jefferson		–		8	–	3	–	1
Rhode Island State		–		6	–	3	–	0
Bucknell		–		6	–	3	–	1
Temple		–		3	–	2	–	0
Penn		–		7	–	4	–	0
Army		–		5	–	3	–	0
Brown		–		6	–	4	–	0
Franklin & Marshall		–		6	–	4	–	0
Holy Cross		–		4	–	3	–	1
Rutgers		–		5	–	4	–	0
Tufts		–		5	–	4	–	0
Fordham		–		4	–	4	–	0
Villanova		–		3	–	3	–	0
Lafayette		–		4	–	5	–	1
Syracuse		–		4	–	5	–	0
Carnegie Tech		–		3	–	4	–	1
New Hampshire		–		3	–	4	–	1
Geneva		–		3	–	4	–	0
Vermont		–		3	–	5	–	0
Pittsburgh		–		3	–	6	–	0
Boston College		–		2	–	4	–	1
Cornell		–		3	–	7	–	0
NYU		–		2	–	6	–	0

The 1912 Vermont Green and Gold football team was an American football team that represented the University of Vermont as an independent during the 1912 college football season. In their only year under head coach Earle T. Pickering, the team compiled a 3–5 record.

== Schedule ==
Date	Opponent	Site	Result	Source
September 25	Fort McKinley	Centennial Field; Burlington, VT	W 13–0	
October 5	RPI	Centennial Field; Burlington, VT	W 6–0	
October 12	at Dartmouth	Hanover, NH	L 0–55	
October 19	Massachusetts	Centennial Field; Burlington, VT	W 7–9	
October 26	Springfield Training School	Centennial Field; Burlington, VT	L 0–7	
November 3	at Brown	Andrews Field; Providence, RI	L 7–12	
November 9	at Holy Cross	Fitton Field; Worcester, MA	L 0–13	
November 16	at Bowdoin	Pine Tree Park; Portland, ME	L 0–7	
