= 1912 Swarthmore Quakers football team =

American college football season

1912 Swarthmore Quakers football
- Conference: Independent
- Record: 7–1–1
- Head coach: George H. Brooke (13th season)
- Home stadium: Whittier Field

1912 Eastern college football independents records
	Conf.			Overall
Team	W	L	T	W		L		T
Harvard		–		9	–	0	–	0
Penn State		–		8	–	0	–	0
Carlisle		–		12	–	1	–	1
Princeton		–		7	–	1	–	1
Swarthmore		–		7	–	1	–	1
Yale		–		7	–	1	–	1
Lehigh		–		9	–	2	–	0
Dartmouth		–		7	–	2	–	0
Wesleyan		–		7	–	2	–	0
Colgate		–		5	–	2	–	0
Washington & Jefferson		–		8	–	3	–	1
Rhode Island State		–		6	–	3	–	0
Bucknell		–		6	–	3	–	1
Temple		–		3	–	2	–	0
Penn		–		7	–	4	–	0
Army		–		5	–	3	–	0
Brown		–		6	–	4	–	0
Franklin & Marshall		–		6	–	4	–	0
Holy Cross		–		4	–	3	–	1
Rutgers		–		5	–	4	–	0
Tufts		–		5	–	4	–	0
Fordham		–		4	–	4	–	0
Villanova		–		3	–	3	–	0
Lafayette		–		4	–	5	–	1
Syracuse		–		4	–	5	–	0
Carnegie Tech		–		3	–	4	–	1
New Hampshire		–		3	–	4	–	1
Geneva		–		3	–	4	–	0
Vermont		–		3	–	5	–	0
Pittsburgh		–		3	–	6	–	0
Boston College		–		2	–	4	–	1
Cornell		–		3	–	7	–	0
NYU		–		2	–	6	–	0

The 1912 Swarthmore Quakers football team was an American football team that represented Swarthmore College as an independent during the 1912 college football season. The team compiled a 7–1–1 record and outscored opponents by a total of 150 to 31. George H. Brooke was the head coach.

== Schedule ==
Date	Opponent	Site	Result	Attendance	Source
September 28	Villanova	Whittier Field; Swarthmore, PA	W 27–0		
October 5	at Lafayette	March Field; Easton, PA	W 22–0		
October 12	at Penn	Franklin Field; Philadelphia, PA	W 6–3		
October 19	at Navy	Worden Field; Annapolis, MD	W 21–6		
October 26	Johns Hopkins	Whittier Field; Swarthmore, PA	W 40–6		
November 2	at Ursinus	Collegeville, PA	W 20–0		
November 9	Lehigh	Whittier Field; Swarthmore, PA	L 0–3		
November 16	Bucknell	Whittier Field; Swarthmore, PA	W 14–13		
November 23	at Dickinson	Carlisle, PA	T 0–0		
