= 1912 Yale Bulldogs football team =

American college football season

1912 Yale Bulldogs football
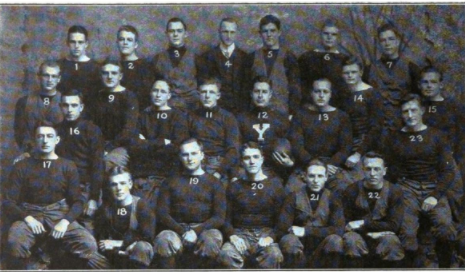
- Conference: Independent
- Record: 7–1–1
- Head coach: Art Howe (1st season)
- Captain: Jesse Spalding
- Home stadium: Yale Field

1912 Eastern college football independents records
	Conf.			Overall
Team	W	L	T	W		L		T
Harvard		–		9	–	0	–	0
Penn State		–		8	–	0	–	0
Carlisle		–		12	–	1	–	1
Princeton		–		7	–	1	–	1
Swarthmore		–		7	–	1	–	1
Yale		–		7	–	1	–	1
Lehigh		–		9	–	2	–	0
Dartmouth		–		7	–	2	–	0
Wesleyan		–		7	–	2	–	0
Colgate		–		5	–	2	–	0
Washington & Jefferson		–		8	–	3	–	1
Rhode Island State		–		6	–	3	–	0
Bucknell		–		6	–	3	–	1
Temple		–		3	–	2	–	0
Penn		–		7	–	4	–	0
Army		–		5	–	3	–	0
Brown		–		6	–	4	–	0
Franklin & Marshall		–		6	–	4	–	0
Holy Cross		–		4	–	3	–	1
Rutgers		–		5	–	4	–	0
Tufts		–		5	–	4	–	0
Fordham		–		4	–	4	–	0
Villanova		–		3	–	3	–	0
Lafayette		–		4	–	5	–	1
Syracuse		–		4	–	5	–	0
Carnegie Tech		–		3	–	4	–	1
New Hampshire		–		3	–	4	–	1
Geneva		–		3	–	4	–	0
Vermont		–		3	–	5	–	0
Pittsburgh		–		3	–	6	–	0
Boston College		–		2	–	4	–	1
Cornell		–		3	–	7	–	0
NYU		–		2	–	6	–	0

The 1912 Yale Bulldogs football team represented Yale University in the 1912 college football season. The Bulldogs finished with a 7–1–1 record under first-year head coach Art Howe. The team's only loss was to Harvard by a 20–0 score in the final game of the season. Yale end Douglas Bomeisler and center Hank Ketcham were consensus picks for the 1912 College Football All-America Team, and two other Yale players (guards Russell Cooney and John Pendleton) received first-team All-America honors from at least one selector. Guard Ted York died following the Army game.

== Schedule ==
Date	Opponent	Site	Result	Attendance	Source
September 25	Wesleyan	Yale Field; New Haven, CT	W 10–3		
September 28	Holy Cross	Yale Field; New Haven, CT	W 7–0	2,000	
October 5	Syracuse	Yale Field; New Haven, CT	W 21–0		
October 12	Lafayette	Yale Field; New Haven, CT	W 16–0		
October 19	at Army	The Plain; West Point, NY	W 6–0	15,000	
October 26	Washington & Jefferson	Yale Field; New Haven, CT	W 13–3		
November 9	Brown	Yale Field; New Haven, CT	W 10–0		
November 16	at Princeton	University Field; Princeton, NJ (rivalry)	T 6–6		
November 23	Harvard	Yale Field; New Haven, CT (rivalry)	L 0–20		

== Roster ==
- Lynn J. Arnold, G
- Benjamin F. Avery, E
- Richard W. Baker, HB
- Thomas L. Bayne
- Douglas Bomeisler, E
- Walter C. Camp, FB
- Lyon Carter, E
- Castles, FB
- Russell S. Cooney, G
- Thomas H. Cornell, QB
- Cornish, QB
- David L. Dunn
- Samuel A. Dyer, QB
- Maurice Bennett Flynn, FB
- Carl Gallauer, E
- Green, G
- Harbison, T
- William F. Howe
- Hank Ketcham, C
- Francis J. Loftus
- Donald Markle, HB
- Henry A. Marting
- Mitchell, QB
- Osborn, E
- John S. Pendleton, T
- Jesse H. Philbin, HB
- Harold A. Pumpelly, FB
- Randall, G
- Norman H. Read, G
- Ogilvie H. Sheldon, E
- Jesse Spalding, HB
- Bud Talbott, T
- H. Warren, T
- William C. Warren, T
- Nathaniel Wheeler, E
- Theodore York, G
