= 1912 Villanova Wildcats football team =

American college football season

1912 Villanova Wildcats football
- Conference: Independent
- Record: 3–3
- Head coach: Charles McGeehan (1st season)
- Captain: Timothy Spillane
- Home stadium: none

1912 Eastern college football independents records
	Conf.			Overall
Team	W	L	T	W		L		T
Harvard		–		9	–	0	–	0
Penn State		–		8	–	0	–	0
Carlisle		–		12	–	1	–	1
Princeton		–		7	–	1	–	1
Swarthmore		–		7	–	1	–	1
Yale		–		7	–	1	–	1
Lehigh		–		9	–	2	–	0
Dartmouth		–		7	–	2	–	0
Wesleyan		–		7	–	2	–	0
Colgate		–		5	–	2	–	0
Washington & Jefferson		–		8	–	3	–	1
Rhode Island State		–		6	–	3	–	0
Bucknell		–		6	–	3	–	1
Temple		–		3	–	2	–	0
Penn		–		7	–	4	–	0
Army		–		5	–	3	–	0
Brown		–		6	–	4	–	0
Franklin & Marshall		–		6	–	4	–	0
Holy Cross		–		4	–	3	–	1
Rutgers		–		5	–	4	–	0
Tufts		–		5	–	4	–	0
Fordham		–		4	–	4	–	0
Villanova		–		3	–	3	–	0
Lafayette		–		4	–	5	–	1
Syracuse		–		4	–	5	–	0
Carnegie Tech		–		3	–	4	–	1
New Hampshire		–		3	–	4	–	1
Vermont		–		3	–	5	–	0
Pittsburgh		–		3	–	6	–	0
Boston College		–		2	–	4	–	1
Cornell		–		3	–	7	–	0
NYU		–		2	–	6	–	0

The 1912 Villanova Wildcats football team represented the Villanova University during the 1912 college football season. The Wildcats team captain was Timothy Spillane.

== Schedule ==
Date	Opponent	Site	Result	Source
September 28	at Swarthmore	Swarthmore, PA	L 0–27	
October 2	vs. Carlisle	Harrisburg, PA	L 0–65	
October 19	at Catholic University	Washington, DC	W 20–7	
November 9	at Penn State	New Beaver Field; State College, PA	L 0–71	
November 16	at Mount St. Mary's	Emmitsburg, MD	W 23–0	
November 30	at Fordham	Fordham Field; Bronx, NY	W 19–0	
