= 1912 Harvard Crimson football team =

American college football season

1912 Harvard Crimson football
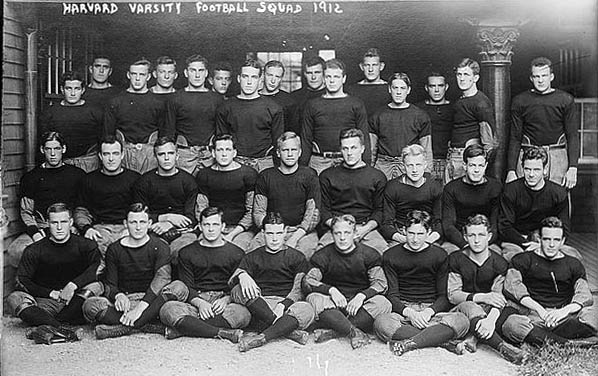

National champion (Billingsley, Helms, Houlgate, Davis) Co-national champion (NCF)
- Conference: Independent
- Record: 9–0
- Head coach: Percy Haughton (5th season)
- Captain: Percy Wendell
- Home stadium: Harvard Stadium

1912 Eastern college football independents records
	Conf.			Overall
Team	W	L	T	W		L		T
Harvard		–		9	–	0	–	0
Penn State		–		8	–	0	–	0
Carlisle		–		12	–	1	–	1
Princeton		–		7	–	1	–	1
Swarthmore		–		7	–	1	–	1
Yale		–		7	–	1	–	1
Lehigh		–		9	–	2	–	0
Dartmouth		–		7	–	2	–	0
Wesleyan		–		7	–	2	–	0
Colgate		–		5	–	2	–	0
Washington & Jefferson		–		8	–	3	–	1
Rhode Island State		–		6	–	3	–	0
Bucknell		–		6	–	3	–	1
Temple		–		3	–	2	–	0
Penn		–		7	–	4	–	0
Army		–		5	–	3	–	0
Brown		–		6	–	4	–	0
Franklin & Marshall		–		6	–	4	–	0
Holy Cross		–		4	–	3	–	1
Rutgers		–		5	–	4	–	0
Tufts		–		5	–	4	–	0
Fordham		–		4	–	4	–	0
Villanova		–		3	–	3	–	0
Lafayette		–		4	–	5	–	1
Syracuse		–		4	–	5	–	0
Carnegie Tech		–		3	–	4	–	1
New Hampshire		–		3	–	4	–	1
Vermont		–		3	–	5	–	0
Pittsburgh		–		3	–	6	–	0
Boston College		–		2	–	4	–	1
Cornell		–		3	–	7	–	0
NYU		–		2	–	6	–	0

The 1912 Harvard Crimson football team was an American football team that represented Harvard University as an independent during the 1912 college football season. In their fifth season under head coach Percy Haughton, the Crimson compiled a perfect 9–0 record, shut out five of nine opponents, and outscored all opponents by a total of 176 to 22. The season was part of an unbeaten streak that began in November 1911 and continued until October 1915.

At the end of the season the team was named as the year's champion by The New York Times. Later, Harvard was retroactively named as the national champion by the Billingsley Report, Helms Athletic Foundation, Houlgate System, and Parke H. Davis, and as a co-national champion by the National Championship Foundation.

Percy Wendell was the team captain. Three Harvard players were consensus first-team selections on the 1912 All-American football team: halfback Charles Brickley, guard Stan Pennock, and end Sam Felton. Other notable players included backs Percy Wendell, Huntington Hardwick, and Henry Burchell Gardner, and linemen Bob Storer, Harvey Hitchcock, Derric Choate Parmenter, Gerard Timothy Driscoll, and Francis Joseph O'Brien. Pennock, Wendell, and Hardwick were later inducted into the College Football Hall of Fame.

== Schedule ==
Date	Opponent	Site	Result	Attendance	Source
September 28	Maine	Harvard Stadium; Boston, MA	W 7–0		
October 5	Holy Cross	Harvard Stadium; Boston, MA	W 19–0	7,000	
October 12	Williams	Harvard Stadium; Boston, MA	W 26–3		
October 19	Amherst	Harvard Stadium; Boston, MA	W 46–0		
October 26	Brown	Harvard Stadium; Boston, MA	W 30–10	> 15,000	
November 2	Princeton	Harvard Stadium; Boston, MA (rivalry)	W 16–6	30,000	
November 9	Vanderbilt	Harvard Stadium; Boston, MA	W 9–3		
November 16	Dartmouth	Harvard Stadium; Boston, MA (rivalry)	W 3–0	> 40,000	
November 23	at Yale	Yale Field; New Haven, CT (rivalry)	W 20–0		
