= List of Carlisle Indians football seasons =

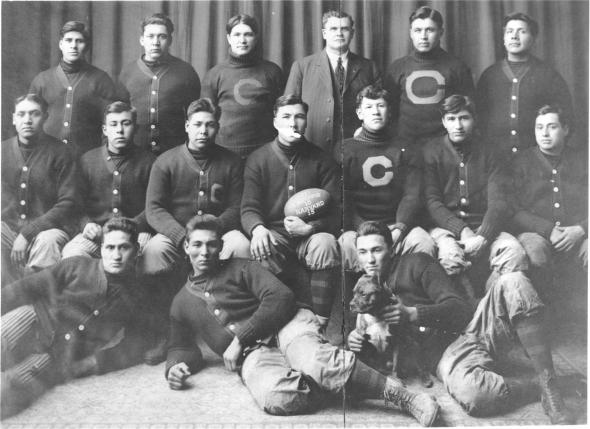
The 1911 Carlisle Indians football team with coach "Pop" Warner (standing, third from right) and Jim Thorpe (seated, third from right) pictured.

The Carlisle Indians football team competed in the highest level of competition in college football during its 25 seasons of play from 1893 until 1917, representing the Carlisle Indian Industrial School. The team's all-time record or 173–91–13, a .648 winning percentage, is the best record of any major defunct college football team.

== Seasons ==
Year	Coach	Record		
Year	Coach	W	L	T
1893	W. G. Thompson	2	1	0
1894	Vance C. McCormick	0	7	2
1895	Vance C. McCormick	4	4	0
1896	Bill Hickok	5	5	0
1897	William T. Bull	6	4	0
1898	John A. Hall	6	4	0
1899	Pop Warner	9	2	0
1900	Pop Warner	6	4	1
1901	Pop Warner	5	7	1
1902	Pop Warner	8	3	0
1903	Pop Warner	11	2	1
1904	Eddie Rogers	9	2	0
1905	George W. Woodruff	10	4	0
1906	Bemus Pierce	9	3	0
1907	Pop Warner	10	1	0
1908	Pop Warner	10	2	1
1909	Pop Warner	8	3	1
1910	Pop Warner	8	6	0
1911	Pop Warner	11	1	0
1912	Pop Warner	12	1	1
1913	Pop Warner	10	1	1
1914	Pop Warner	5	9	1
1915	Victor M. "Choctaw" Kelly	3	7	2
1916	M.L. Clevett	1	3	1
1917	Leo F. "Deed" Harris	3	6	0
