= Martin Wheelock =

Profile
- Position: Tackle

Personal information
- Born: June 5, 1874; Oneida, Wisconsin, U.S.
- Died: May 25, 1937 (aged 62); Belle Plaine, Wisconsin, U.S.
- Listed height: 6 ft 0 in (1.83 m)
- Listed weight: 185 lb (84 kg)

Career information
- College: Carlisle (1894–1902)

Awards and highlights
- 2× Second-team All-American (1899, 1901)

Martin Frederick Wheelock (June 5, 1874 – May 25, 1937) was an American college football player who achieved a national reputation while playing for the Carlisle Indian School from 1894 to 1902. Captain of the 1899 Carlisle Indians football team, Wheelock was selected as a first-team All-American by the New York Sun in 1899, a second-team All-American by Walter Camp in 1901, and to the All-University Team by the Philadelphia Inquirer in 1902. In later life, he worked as a blacksmith and farmer.

In 1913, coach Pop Warner named Wheelock to the All-Time American Indian Football Team. In 1980, he was inducted into the American Indian Athletic Hall of Fame.

== Early life and education ==
Martin Frederick Wheelock was born into the Oneida Nation of Wisconsin at Oneida in 1874. He first attended local schools.

The Carlisle Indian School in Pennsylvania recruited students from all Native American tribes. It recruited Wheelock, at age 16, and several other Oneida youth as students, who started at the school in September 1890. In the late 19th century the school started to build up its football team and competed against college football teams by the turn of the century.

== Football ==
Wheelock played tackle for the Carlisle Indians football team from 1894 to 1902. He was captain of the team in 1899. The success of the Carlisle football team against college teams was a source of great pride for Native Americans.

In 1897, the Indian Helper (the Carlisle school newspaper) described a celebration that greeted the football team on its return from a game played in New York City against students from Yale University:

”On Monday morning after breakfast, the football team, who returned the evening before from the Yale game which was played at New York last Saturday, was treated to a free ride across the parade, in the large four horse herdic, drawn by the entire battalion. Capt. Pierce, Frank Cayou, Frank Hudson, and Martin Wheelock occupied the small phaeton drawn by boys, and went in advance of the others. The band played lively marches, as handkerchiefs waved and mouths shouted. The demonstration was a great surprise to all making a unique scene for such an early morning hour. The school is proud of the record made for clean playing, and were gratified that the boys scored.”

In nine years playing for the Carlisle football team (from age 20 to 29), Wheelock was one of the school's greatest stars. He played on the renowned Carlisle teams of 1899-1902, which were coached by football legend Pop Warner. These teams defeated many of the best college teams in the United States. Wheelock was selected as a first-team All-American by the New York Sun in 1899, a second-team All-American by Walter Camp in 1901, and to the All-University Team by the Philadelphia Inquirer in 1902.

In 1897, Wheelock became one of the first football players to receive an x-ray to assess an injury, after being hurt in a game against Brown University. The following account was published in newspapers across the country:

"Martin Wheelock, right tackle of the Carlisle football eleven, a big Indian, six feet high, became acquainted with the latest acquisition to the white man's science, the X-ray, in the J. Hood Wright memorial hospital in New York City. ... Wheelock was deeply interested in the performance. The bones in his hand were shown him, and he was delighted. Then the x-ray was turned on his injured shoulder, and it was plainly seen he had suffered a fracture. The physicians declared the man the finest specimen of humanity they had ever seen. ..."

== Later life ==
Wheelock left the Carlisle Indian School in 1902 at age 28. He returned to the Oneida reservation, where he worked as a blacksmith and farmer.

== Marriage and family ==
Wheelock married Lena Webster, an Oneida and fellow former Carlisle student. At the time, he was living in Seymour, Wisconsin. They had four children together: Eleanor and Elmer (twins), Ervin and Martin. Their son Martin Wheelock began working for the Bureau of Indian Affairs in 1938 with the Ute Indians in Utah.

== Legacy and honors ==
In 1913, Pop Warner named Wheelock to his "All-Time American Indian Football Team." He included such renowned players as Jim Thorpe, Jimmy Johnson, Bemus Pierce, Joe Guyon, and Albert Exendine. In 1980, Wheelock was inducted into the American Indian Athletic Hall of Fame, based at Haskell Indian Nations University.
