= Frank Mount Pleasant =

American sportsman (1884–1937)

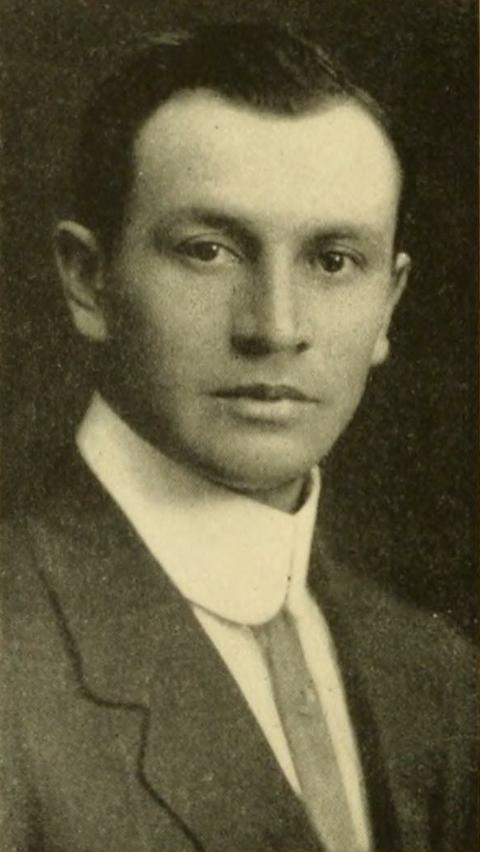
- Mount Pleasant pictured in Instano 1912, Indiana Normal yearbook

Biographical details
- Born: June 13, 1884; Tuscarora Reservation, New York, U.S.
- Died: April 12, 1937 (aged 52); Buffalo, New York, U.S.

Playing career

Football
- 1905–1907: Carlisle
- 1908–1909: Dickinson
- Positions: Quarterback, halfback

Coaching career (HC unless noted)

Football
- 1910: Franklin & Marshall
- 1911–1913: Indiana Normal
- 1914: West Virginia Wesleyan
- 1915: Buffalo

Basketball
- 1910–1911: Franklin & Marshall

Baseball
- 1911: Franklin & Marshall

Head coaching record
- Overall: 35–15–3 (football); 4–4 (basketball); 5–7–1 (baseball)

Franklin Pierce Mount Pleasant Jr. (June 13, 1884 – April 12, 1937) was a Native American football player, track and field athlete, and coach of football, basketball, and baseball. He played college football at the Carlisle Indian Industrial School and Dickinson College and graduated from Dickinson in 1910. He was the first Native American to graduate from Dickinson. He made the 1904 and 1908 US Olympic track teams, placing sixth in the triple jump and long jump at the 1908 Summer Olympics.

Mount Pleasant served as the head football coach at Franklin & Marshall College (1910), Indiana Normal School, now Indiana University of Pennsylvania (1911–1913), West Virginia Wesleyan College (1914), and the University at Buffalo (1915). He was also the head basketball coach at Franklin & Marshall for the 1910–11 season and the school's head baseball coach in the spring of 1911. After World War I, in which he served as a first lieutenant, he settled in Buffalo, New York, where he worked odd jobs.

== Early life and athletic career ==
Franklin Pierce Mount Pleasant Jr., called Frank, was born into the nation on the Tuscarora Indian Reservation in New York; it is the Sixth Nation of the Iroquois Confederacy. He was the son of Tribal Chief John (aka Frank Senior) and Rachael. At a time when federal Indian policy emphasized assimilation, Mount Pleasant was sent as a child to be educated at Native American boarding schools. (Note: Most Native American boarding schools were not yet established; Carlisle was the first in the 1890s. He more likely attended a religious mission school at that time.)

He eventually attended the Carlisle Indian Industrial School in Pennsylvania from 1902 to 1907, where he competed as both a long jumper on the track team and as a quarterback and halfback on the football team. The 1907 Carlisle Indians team, coached by Pop Warner went 10–1 with a 26–6 victory over the perennial powerhouse, Harvard. The team's only loss of the season came against Princeton, in a game in which Mount Pleasant did not play.

His teammates included Jim Thorpe, future Pro Football Hall of Famer, and Albert Exendine, future College Football Hall of Fame inductee. Despite being a second-team All-American, Mount Pleasant never played professional football; the National Football League (NFL) was not started until 1920. He did play semi-pro football in Buffalo, New York. Mount Pleasant, under Coach Pop Warner, was arguably the first to throw the spiral pass.

During college, Mount Pleasant tried out for the Olympics and became the first Carlisle student to qualify; he made it to the 1908 U.S. Olympic track teams. At the 1908 Olympics in London, Mount Pleasant finished sixth in both the triple jump and the long jump competitions. This ended his track and field career, leaving him with career bests of 23 feet 2 1/4 inches (7.068 meters) for the long jump and 45 feet 10 inches (13.97 meters) for the triple jump.

== Coaching career ==
After the Olympics, Mount Pleasant completed his studies at Dickinson College, becoming its first Native American graduate. He worked as the head football coach at Franklin & Marshall College for the 1910 season. His coaching record at Franklin & Marshall was 4–3–2. For the following three years, he was the head football coach at the Indiana Normal School, now Indiana University of Pennsylvania. His last two teams won state championships. Mount Pleasant moved to the University of Buffalo in 1915, where he coached the football team to a 3–4 season. Mount Pleasant's coaching career was cut short by World War I. He was commissioned and served as an officer, a first lieutenant.

== Later life and death ==
After the war, Mount Pleasant settled in Buffalo, New York. He played several years of semi-pro football with the Buffalo All-Stars. The team included many former college stars, including Tall Chief, a teammate at Carlisle Indian School. Mount Pleasant worked odd jobs throughout the remainder of his life. He enjoyed playing the piano.

His death in 1937 is a mystery, as two policemen found him unconscious on a Buffalo sidewalk. He died three days later at Emergency Hospital. Initial reports indicated that Mount Pleasant sustained a fractured skull, "possibly by violence." But the next day, Francis M. Kujawa, the Buffalo medical examiner, ruled the death as the result of an accidental fall.

== Legacy and honors ==
Mount Pleasant was posthumously inducted into the American Indian Athletic Hall of Fame (1973), the Hall of Fame at Indiana University of Pennsylvania (1998), and that of Dickinson College. In 2007 Chapman University in Southern California named a library after him.

== Head coaching record ==
=== Football ===
| Year | Team | Overall | Conference | Standing | Bowl/playoffs |
|---|---|---|---|---|---|
Franklin & Marshall (Independent) (1910)
| 1910 | Franklin & Marshall | 4–3–2 | | | |
| Franklin & Marshall: | | 4–3–2 | | | |
Indiana Normal (Independent) (1911–1913)
| 1911 | Indiana Normal | 5–3–1 | | | |
| 1912 | Indiana Normal | 9–1 | | | |
| 1913 | Indiana Normal | 9–1 | | | |
| Indiana Normal: | | 23–5–1 | | | |
West Virginia Wesleyan Bobcats (Independent) (1914)
| 1914 | West Virginia Wesleyan | 4–3 | | | |
| West Virginia Wesleyan: | | 4–3 | | | |
Buffalo Bulls (Independent) (1915)
| 1915 | Buffalo | 4–4 | | | |
| Buffalo: | | 4–4 | | | |
| Total: | | 35–15–3 | | | |
