= Frank Hudson (American football) =

American football player (1875–1950)

- Photograph of Hudson from the American Indian Athletic Hall of Fame
- Born: 1875; Paguate, New Mexico, U.S.
- Died: December 24, 1950 (aged 74–75); Bucks County, Pennsylvania, U.S.
- Citizenship: United States
- Education: Carlisle Indian Industrial School

Frank Hudson (1875 – December 24, 1950) was a football player and coach who was a member of the Laguna Pueblo tribe from New Mexico.

He played college football for the Carlisle Indian Industrial School from 1895 to 1899 and was considered one of the greatest kickers in the early years of American football. In 1898, he became the first Native American player of the sport to be selected as an All-American. He was selected as a first-team All-American by Outing magazine in both 1898 and 1899.

From 1904 to 1906, he served as an assistant coach of the Carlisle football team, becoming one of the first non-white coaches in college football history.

== Early years ==
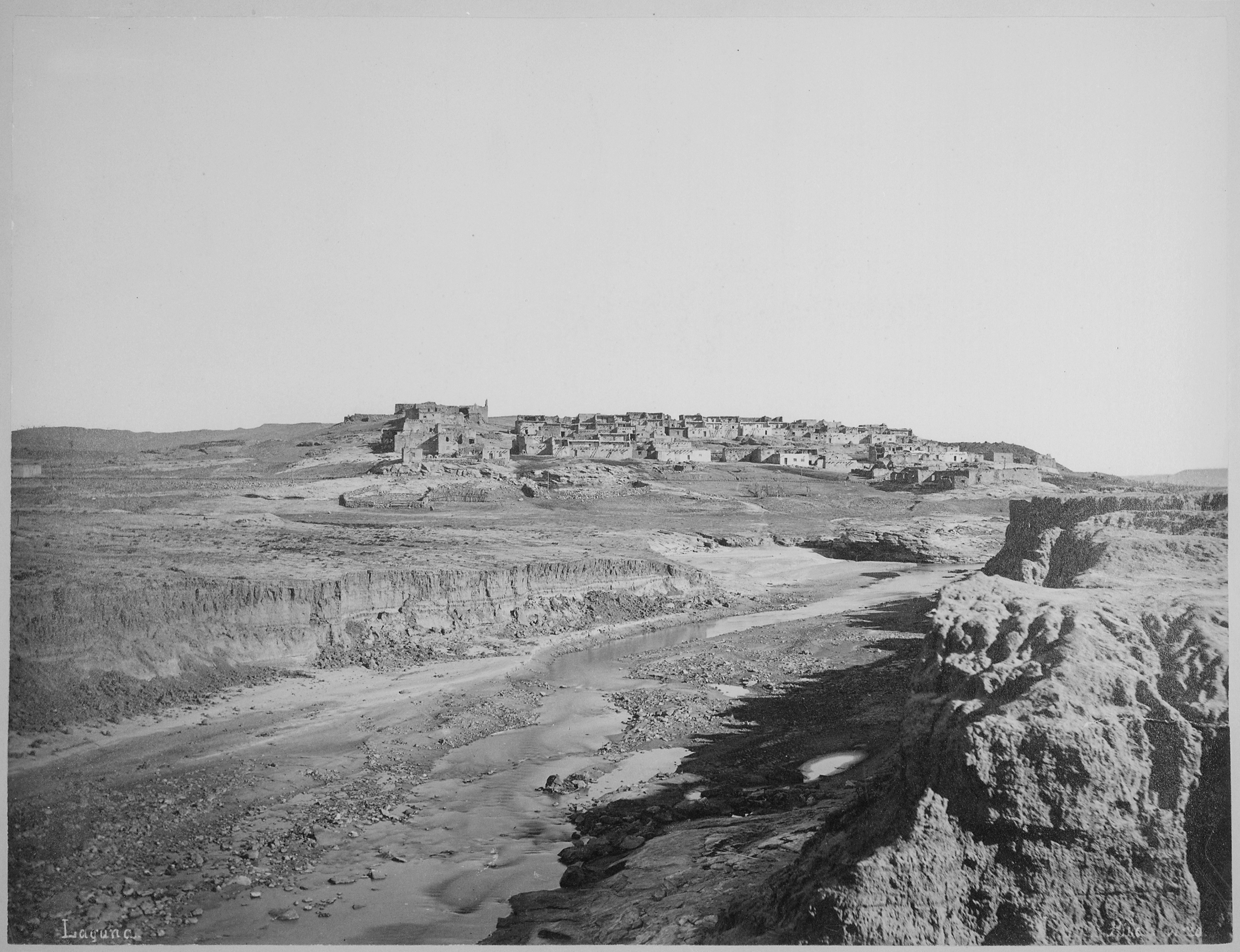
Laguna Pueblo, New Mexico, in 1879 -- four years after Hudson's birth

Hudson was born around 1875 in Paguate, New Mexico. His date of birth was unknown. He was a member of the Laguna Pueblo tribe.

== Playing career ==
=== Carlisle ===
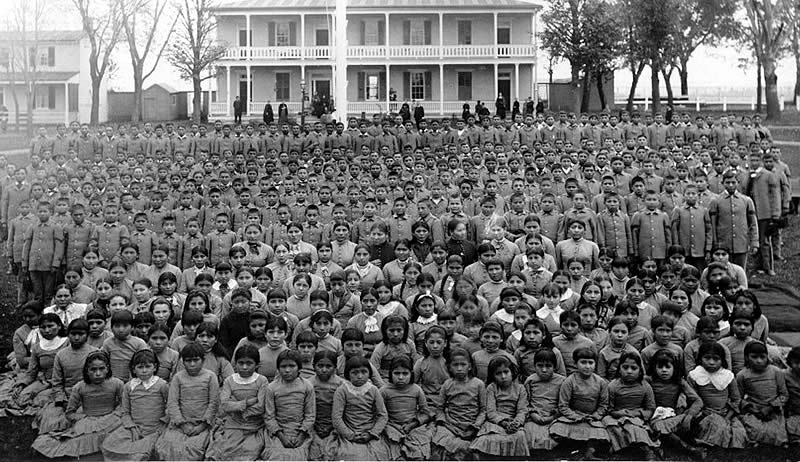
Native American pupils at Carlisle Indian School, c. 1900

Hudson left his home and tribe in New Mexico to attend the Carlisle Indian Industrial School, an Indian boarding school in Carlisle, Pennsylvania, formed for the purpose of assimilating Native American children from 39 tribes into the majority culture. While at Carlisle, Hudson became a star on the school's football team. He was the quarterback at Carlisle as early as 1895. In December 1896, he played in what is reported to have been "the first game under electric light"—a victory over Wisconsin. According to a press account from 1897, Hudson was only five feet, three inches tall, and weighed 130 pounds.

==== 1897 season ====
Hudson gained national notice during the 1897 season as a kicking star.

In 1897, Hudson gained acclaim for drop-kicking field goals against two of the top teams in the country—Yale and Penn. Hudson accounted for all of Carlisle's points in a 20–10 loss to Penn at Franklin Field in Philadelphia. The New York Times wrote that "little Hudson showed his ability as a kicker by dropping the ball squarely between the posts." The game against Yale was played at the Polo Grounds in New York, and The New York Times described Hudson's field goal as follows:

"[S]teadying himself for an instant the ball was dropped and with a delicate touch from his foot was sent sailing straight as a die toward the Yale goal. The spectators held their breath and watched the ball as it sailed on just over the heads of the Yale players and finally dropped over the bar. Then they cheered and young Hudson was the hero of the day. The goal was one of the prettiest ever seen ..."

The success of the Carlisle football team was a source of great pride for Native Americans. In 1897, the Indian Helper (the Carlisle school newspaper) described a celebration that greeted the football team on its return from a game played in New York City against Yale University:

"On Monday morning after breakfast, the football team, who returned the evening before from the Yale game which was played at New York last Saturday, was treated to a free ride across the parade, in the large four horse herdic, drawn by the entire battalion. Capt. Pierce, Frank Cayou, Frank Hudson, and Martin Wheelock occupied the small phaeton drawn by boys, and went in advance of the others. The band played lively marches, as handkerchiefs waved and mouths shouted. The demonstration was a great surprise to all making a unique scene for such an early morning hour. The school is proud of the record made for clean playing, and were gratified that the boys scored.”

==== 1898 season ====
In 1898, Hudson became the captain of the Carlisle football team. In October 1898, he accounted for all five of Carlisle's points in an 18–5 loss to Yale. The New York Times reported: "The five points to Carlisle's credit are due to Quarterback Hudson's marvelous skill in kicking a goal from the forty-five-yard line. The trick caused consternation in the Yale line." The following week, Hudson again accounted for all of Carlisle's points in an 11–5 loss to Harvard. At the conclusion of the 1898 season, he was selected as the first-team quarterback on Outing magazine's 1898 College Football All-America Team. He was the first Native American player to be selected as an All-American.

==== 1899 season ====
Hudson was the quarterback and drop-kicker for the 1899 Carlisle Indian team that compiled a 9–2 record. In a 22–10 loss to Harvard, Hudson's kicking was again a featured attraction. The New York Times reported: "And now came the feature of the game, for which everybody had been waiting. The Indians advanced the ball to Harvard's thirty-five-yard line, when Hudson dropped back for a goal from the field. A second later and the pigskin went straight through the goal posts, and everybody was digging his neighbors' ribs and saying, 'I told you so.'" For the first time, Carlisle defeated one of the "Big Four" of college football, defeating Penn by a score of 16 to 5.

The 1899 Carlisle team drew further acclaim after defeating Columbia, 45–0, in a Thanksgiving Day game played at Manhattan Field near the Polo Grounds in New York. Hudson drop-kicked four goals from touchdown and one field goal in the victory over Columbia. The New York Times cited Hudson's use of the drop kick technique as one of the features of the game:

"The other novelty was the way in which Hudson kicked goals. Instead of making a kick from a placed ball held by one of his eleven he chose to make all his tries for a goal by a drop kick, and he succeeded in most of his efforts. It was a new feature for a match game, though frequently tried in practice."

With its only two losses having come to Harvard and Princeton (ranked No. 1 and No. 2 in the country), the 1899 Carlisle team was ranked No. 4 in the country by Walter Camp.

For the second consecutive year, he was selected as a first-team All-American on Outing magazine's 1899 College Football All-America Team. He was also selected as a third-team All-American on Walter Camp's 1899 All-America team.

The 1899 Carlisle team concluded its season with a 2–0 victory over an undefeated University of California team on Christmas Day in San Francisco. On the return trip from California, the Carlisle team stopped at the Haskell Indian Institute in Lawrence, Kansas, where a 12-year-old Jim Thorpe was in the crowd that greeted Hudson, Isaac Seneca, Martin Wheelock, and the rest of the Carlisle team.

=== Professional football ===
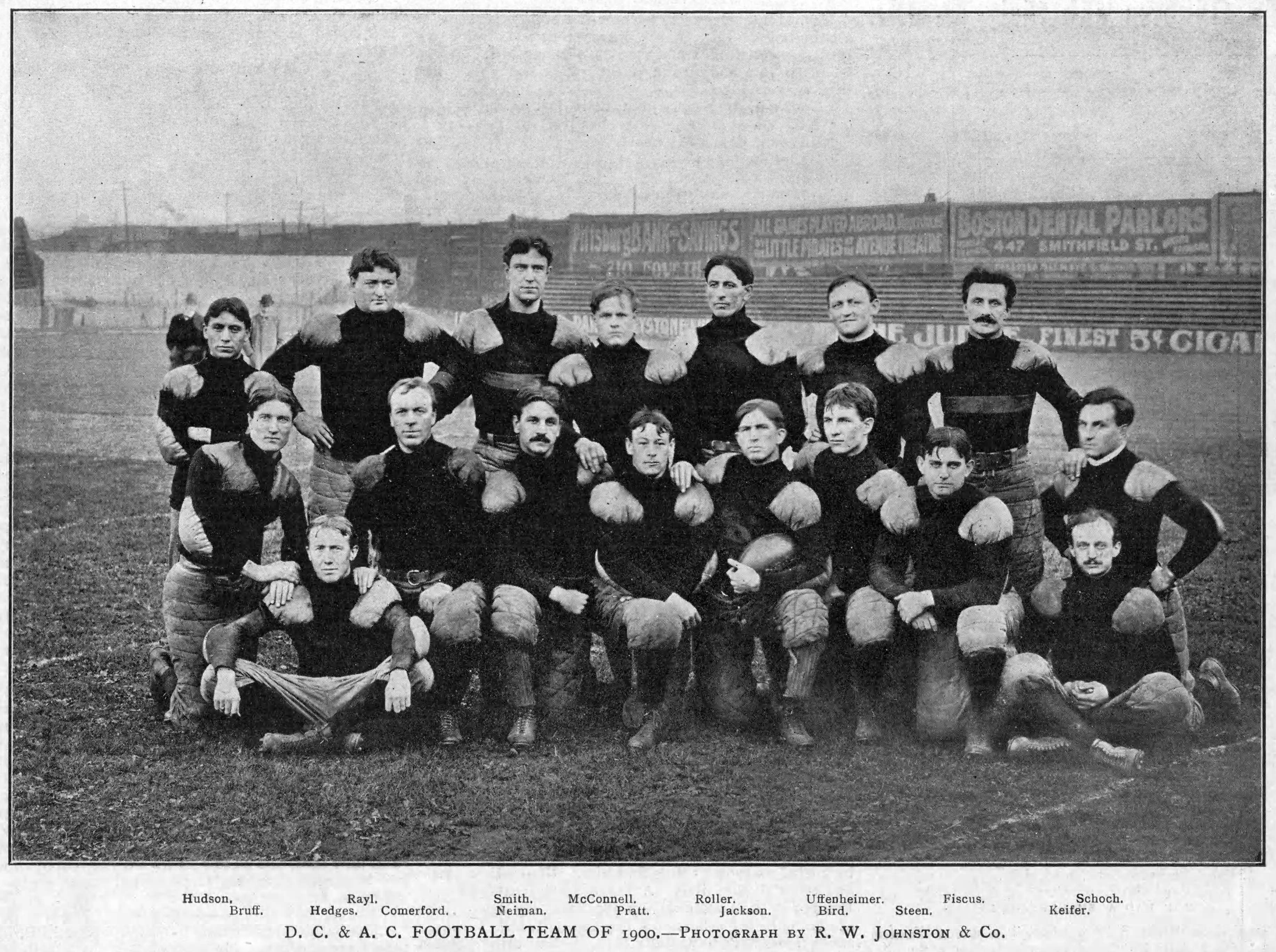
Hudson (standing, far left) with Duquesne team in 1900

In 1900, Hudson secured a position with a bank in Pittsburgh, and played a season of professional football with that city's Duquesne Country and Athletic Club.

=== Legacy ===
For years after his playing career ended, Hudson was considered to have been the greatest kicker in the sport's history. In 1910, one sportswriter noted:

"Frank Hudson, the greatest kicker, not barring Pat O'Dea, Marshall Reynolds, Billy Bull or John De Witt, who ever hoisted a spiral was an Indian. He was the greatest goal kicker known to football, and one of his best stunts was to stand in front of the goal posts with five footballs in his arms. He would drop them in quick succession to the ground, and as each touched the earth he toed them through the goal posts. He could drop-kick as far as fifty-five yards."

== Coaching career ==
In 1904, Hudson became an assistant coach of the Carlisle football team. The national media covered the selection of non-whites to coach the Carlisle team as an experiment, with the Boston Daily Globe running a headline: "FULL BLOODED INDIANS Coaching a Football Team: Will they prove equal in brains and skill to the paleface gridiron strategists of the leading universities? Carlisle is trying the experiment for the first time this season."

In 1905, he was responsible for coaching the backs and training the kickers. Along with Bemus Pierce, Hudson coached the 1906 Carlisle team with Pop Warner serving as advisory coach.

== Later years ==
Hudson worked as a banker from at least 1900 to 1926. In January 1904, the Red Man and Helper reported:

"Frank Hudson is a principal clerk in a bank in Pittsburg. He was a little Indian when he came here years ago. Frank does more to give the people in the city of Pittsburg right conceptions of the Indian than all the Indian Rights Associations ever organized in the country."

Hudson, who later became a farmer, never married. He died in December 1950 of a cerebral hemorrhage at his farm in Bucks County, Pennsylvania. He was posthumously inducted into the American Indian Athletic Hall of Fame in 1973.

== See also ==
- Benjey, Tom (2008). Doctors, Lawyers, Indian Chiefs: Jim Thorpe & Pop Warner's Carlisle Indian School football immortals tackle socialites, bootleggers, students, moguls, prejudice, the government, ghouls, tooth decay and rum, pp. 54–60. Tuxedo Press, ISBN 978-0-9774486-7-8.
