= Peter Hauser (American football) =

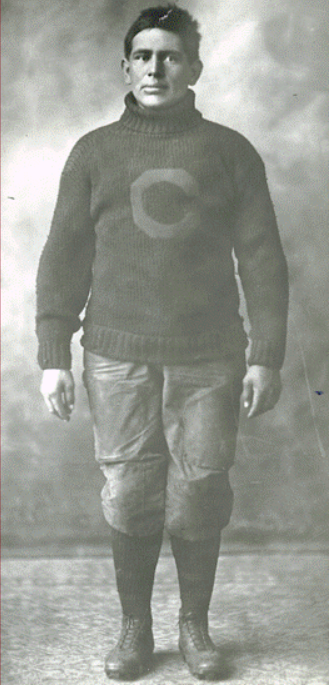

Carlisle Indians
- Position: Fullback

Personal information
- Born: June 10, 1887; Fort Reno, Oklahoma Territory
- Died: July 21, 1935 (aged 48)

Career information
- College: Haskell (1904–1905); Carlisle (1906–1910)

Awards and highlights
- Consensus All-American (1907)

Herman Peter Hauser (June 10, 1887 – July 21, 1935) was a United States Native American football player. He played for the Haskell Indians football team from 1904 to 1905 and for the Carlisle Indians football team from 1906 to 1910 and was selected as a consensus first-team fullback on the 1907 College Football All-America Team. He was a multi-talented player who ran with the ball, handled place-kicking and punt returns, and has been credited as the first player in American football to throw a spiral pass.

== Early life ==
Records are in dispute as to Hauser's year of birth. Hauser's World War I draft registration card stated that he was born on June 10, 1887, at Fort Reno, a U.S. Army outpost on the old Cheyenne-Arapaho reservation in Indian Territory, in what later became central Oklahoma. The 1900 Census, on the other hand, recorded his date of birth as being in June 1885. A third birth year, 1884, is suggested by Hauser's entry at the American Indian Athletic Hall of Fame.

Between 1892 and 1894, U.S. Indian census rolls list Hauser living with his mother (Anna Hauser), and older brother (Emil Hauser) and two younger sisters (Louisa and Anna Hauser) in the Oklahoma territory. Peter and Emil were listed as students at the Halstead School.

By 1896, Hauser's mother had remarried, and the family was living with the mother's new husband, Waldo Reed.

By 1900, Hauser and brother, Emil, were no longer with their mother or sisters and were listed as orphans at the Mennonite Orphan & Aid Society in Lakin Township, Harvey County, Kansas. They were listed as having had a German father and an Indian mother. Hauser's entry at the American Indian Athletic Hall of Fame describes him as Cheyenne.

== Football player ==
By 1904, Hauser was a student at the Haskell Institute, a boarding school established for Native American children. He played football for the Haskell Indians football team from 1904 to 1905. In November 1904, the Haskell football team played an exhibition game at the St. Louis World's Fair before a crowd of 12,000 spectators. Hauser, playing at the right end position, scored Haskell's only points on a field goal from the 18-yard line.

In 1906, he was transferred to the Carlisle Indian Industrial School in Carlisle, Pennsylvania. There, he played for the Carlisle Indians football team from 1906 to 1910 under head coach Glenn Scobey Warner.

Hauser became a star during the 1907 season. In an early game, he scored a touchdown and kicked a field goal in a 10–0 victory over Villanova. In October 1907, Hauser ran for a touchdown and kicked to goals after touchdown, scoring eight points, in Carlisle's 14–6 victory over the team from Syracuse University. In November 1907, The New York Times wrote that Hauser handled kicking duties for Carlisle, returned punts, and was also "the mainstay of the defense." That same month, Carlise defeated the Harvard football team, then one of the top teams in the country, by a 25–13 score in front of a crowd of 30,000 spectators in Cambridge, Massachusetts. The New York Times wrote that Hauser's end runs were "marvels" and that he was able to circle the Harvard ends "at will." Carlisle's 1907 season ended with an 18–4 victory over Amos Alonzo Stagg's Chicago Maroons football team. Hauser was described as "a one-man wrecking crew" against Chicago, as he kicked two field goals and an extra point and threw a 50-yard touchdown pass as well.

Hauser's most historic moment, however, came on October 27, 1907, against a Penn team that won every other game and was declared national champion. The "national champions" lost to Carlisle by a 26–6 score. At a time when forward passes were generally short tosses, Hauser threw a pass 40 yards, hitting his receiver in stride. In her history of Native Americans in football, Sally Jenkins called Hauser's long, 40-yard spiral pass against Penn one of the "three or four signal moments in the evolution of football" and "the sporting equivalent of the Wright brothers taking off at Kitty Hawk." The Philadelphia North American compared it to the "puny" passes of the day, called it "a lordly throw, a hurl that went farther than many a kick," and predicted that Hauser's throw would be "talked of often this year." Hauser's secret was throwing the ball in a spiral, allowing it to travel farther downfield. Carlisle head coach, Pop Warner, said that Hauser was credited as the first football player to throw a spiral pass and could "hit his ends on the dead run with uncanny accuracy."

After the 1907 season, Hauser was selected as a consensus first-team fullback on the 1907 College Football All-America Team. Hauser and teammate, Albert Exendine, became the third and fourth Carlisle players to receive consensus All-American honors, following halfback Isaac Seneca in 1898 and quarterback Jimmy Johnson in 1903. Jim Thorpe became Carlisle's fifth consensus All-American in 1911. Carlisle coach Warner chose Hauser at the fullback on his all-time Carlisle football team and compared him favorably to Thorpe. According to Warner, Hauser was "practically a replica of Jim Thorpe."

== Later life ==
Hauser returned to El Reno, Oklahoma, the town that had built up around his birthplace at Fort Reno. He took an allotment and died in an automobile accident while changing a tire. Accounts differ as to whether he died in 1935, or the 1940s. He was posthumously inducted into the American Indian Athletic Hall of Fame in 1987.
