= Peter Hauser =

Peter Hauser may refer to:

- Peter Hauser (footballer)
- Peter Hauser (American football)
