= Pop Warner =

American college football coach (1871–1954)

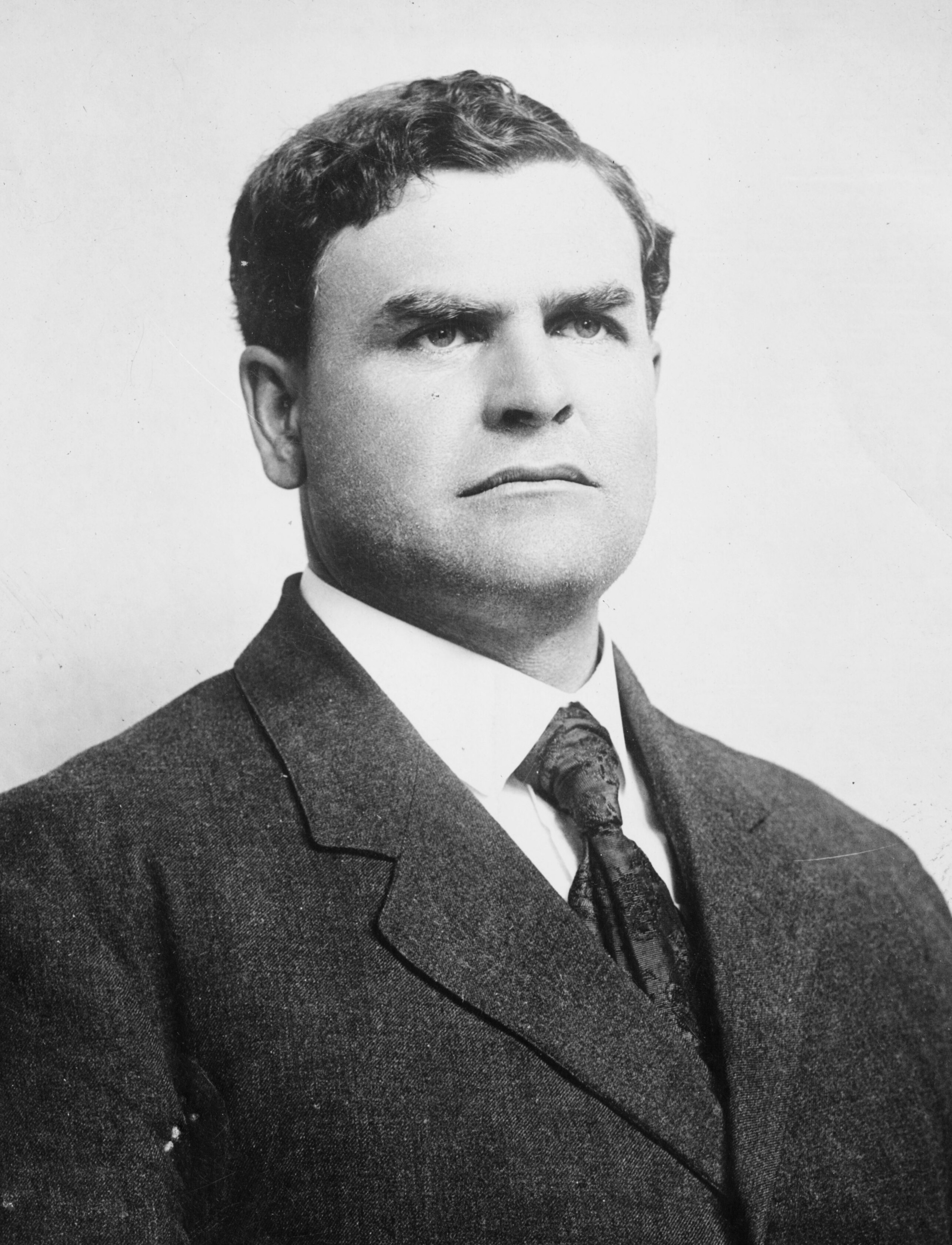
- Warner in 1900

Biographical details
- Born: April 5, 1871; Springville, New York, U.S.
- Died: September 7, 1954 (aged 83); Palo Alto, California, U.S.

Playing career

Football
- 1892–1894: Cornell
- 1902: Syracuse Athletic Club
- Position: Guard

Coaching career (HC unless noted)

Football
- 1895–1896: Georgia
- 1895–1899: Iowa Agricultural/State
- 1897–1898: Cornell
- 1899–1903: Carlisle
- 1904–1906: Cornell
- 1907–1914: Carlisle
- 1915–1923: Pittsburgh
- 1924–1932: Stanford
- 1933–1938: Temple
- 1939–1940: San Jose State (associate)

Baseball
- 1905–1906: Cornell

Head coaching record
- Overall: 319–106–32 (football) (Note: The NCAA credits Warner with a career football coaching record of 319–106–32. The College Football Data Warehouse gives him one fewer win with the Carlisle Indians in 1908 for a career record of 318–106–32. Neither includes the five seasons at Iowa State (1895–1899) during which time Warner co-coached the Cyclones to a record of 18–8 while he simultaneously coached at three other schools.); 36–15 (baseball)
- Bowls: 1–1–2

Accomplishments and honors

Championships
- 4 national (1915, 1916, 1918, 1926); 1 SIAA (1896); 4 PCC (1924, 1926–1927, 1929)

Awards
- Amos Alonzo Stagg Award (1948)
- College Football Hall of Fame; Inducted in 1951 (profile)

Glenn Scobey Warner (April 5, 1871 – September 7, 1954), most commonly known as Pop Warner, was an American college football coach at various institutions who is responsible for several key aspects of the modern game. Included among his innovations are the single and double wing formations (precursors of the modern spread and shotgun formations), the three point stance and the body blocking technique. Fellow pioneer coach Amos Alonzo Stagg called Warner "one of the excellent creators". He was inducted as a coach into the College Football Hall of Fame as part of its inaugural class in 1951. He also contributed to a junior football program which became known as Pop Warner Little Scholars, a popular youth American football organization.

In the early 1900s, he created a premier football program at the Carlisle Indian Industrial School—a federally-funded, off-reservation American Indian boarding school. He also coached teams to four national championships: Pittsburgh in 1915, 1916, and 1918 and Stanford in 1926. In all, he was head coach at the University of Georgia (1895–1896), Iowa Agricultural College and Model Farm (1895–1899), Cornell University (1897–1898 and 1904–1906), Carlisle (1899–1903 and 1907–1914), Pittsburgh (1915–1923), Stanford (1924–1932) and Temple University (1933–1938), compiling a career college football record of 319–106–32. Predating Bear Bryant, Eddie Robinson, and Joe Paterno, he once had the most wins of any coach in college football history.

== Early years ==
Warner was born April 5, 1871, on a farm in Springville, New York. He was the son of William Warner, a cavalry officer in the American Civil War, and schoolteacher Adaline Scobey. In 1878 a railroad came to Springville, and four years later the family moved to a house on East Main Street.

Plump as a child, Warner was sometimes known as "Butter". He began playing baseball at an early age, and was a skilled pitcher. Nobody in town owned a football; his only exposure to the new sport at a young age was with an inflated cow's bladder, and as few knew the rules, the game more resembled soccer. Warner's East Main Street house attracted a number of friends; when a neighbor told his mother that the boys' play would damage her lawn, she replied: "I'm raising boys, not grass."

In 1889 at 19 years old, Warner graduated from Springville-Griffith Institute and joined his family in moving down to Wichita Falls, Texas, to work on their newly purchased cattle and wheat ranch totaling over hundreds of acres. Aside from ranching, Warner got a job assisting a tinsmith. He was already interested in art as a child, learning how to paint watercolor landscapes, and as a tinsmith he learned how to use tools to make things like cups, teapots, baking pans, and lanterns. (Note: Some consider these skills and experiences those that first inspired Warner to later make improvements to shoulder and thigh pads, as well as tackling dummies.)

=== Student years at Cornell ===
In 1892, Warner returned to Springville and began to use his cowboy experience to gamble on horse races. Although he had no interest in college, soon after coming back he attended Cornell Law School, as he had lost all of his money at the races. Later Warner wrote "I dare not write to my father and tell him I was broke"—he felt that the only way to get funds was to inform his father that he had decided to study law. His father, who had always wanted him to be a lawyer, sent him $100 (equivalent to about $3,600 in 2025). Eventually, Warner became known as "Pop" because he was one of the oldest students at Cornell. Warner graduated from Cornell in 1894 and began working as an attorney in Buffalo, New York. This job only lasted for a few months.

==== Playing career ====
On Warner's train ride to Ithaca, where Cornell is located, he met Carl Johanson, then Cornell's football coach, who was impressed by Warner's weight (200 pounds). Johanson practically ordered Warner to attend practice. This happened even though Warner admitted that he had never handled a real football. Despite his commitment to football, at the time Warner's true passion was baseball. During one of his first practices at Cornell he badly injured his shoulder and never played serious baseball again. Warner also participated in track and field and was the school's heavyweight boxing champion for two years.

===== Football =====
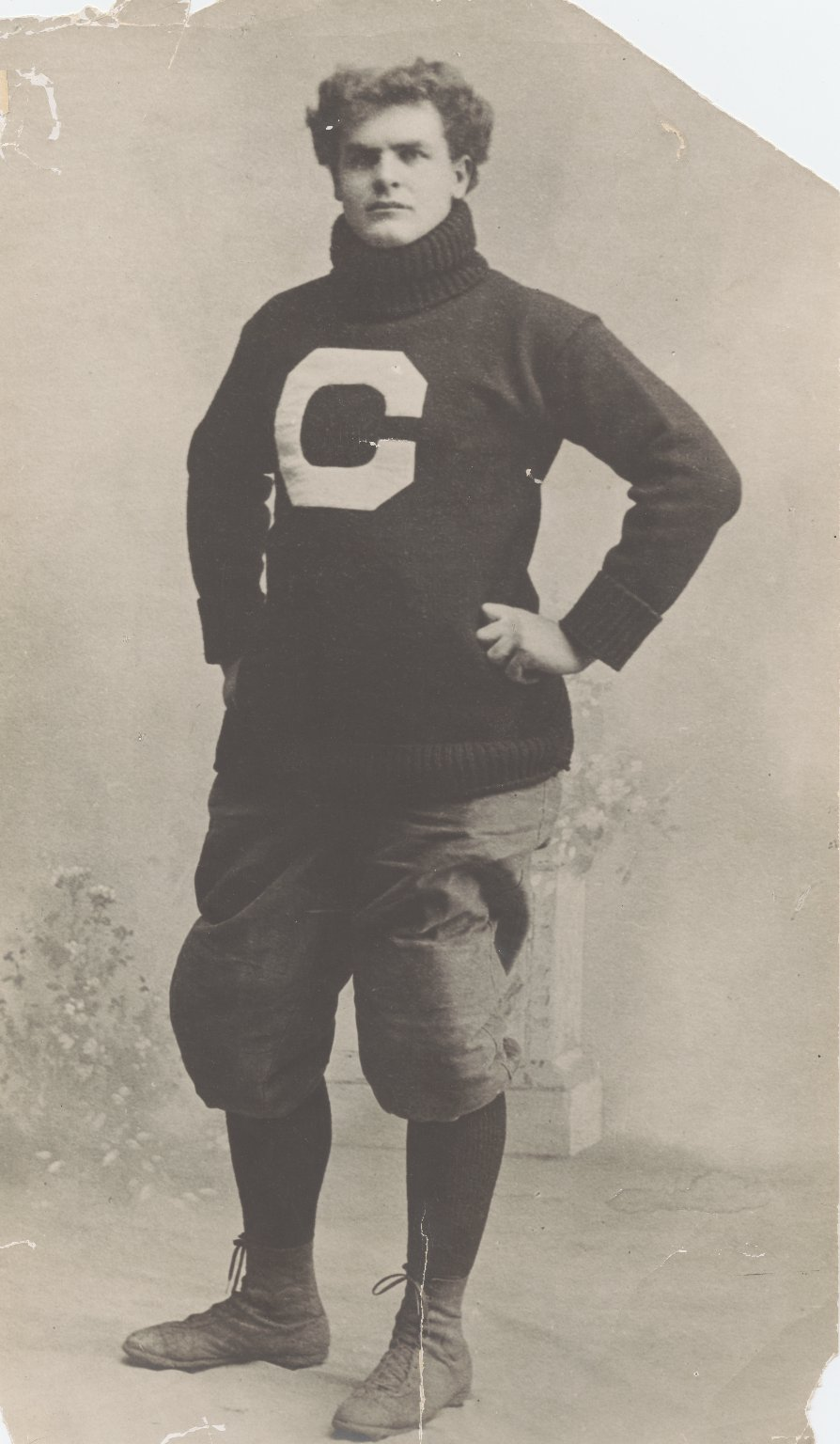
Warner in a Cornell uniform, c. 1894

During his three years at Cornell, Warner played as a guard on the football team. Even though he graduated in the spring of 1894, he returned as a post-graduate and was named captain of the 1894 team, which had a 6–4–1 record. (Note: That year Cornell lost to Michigan, marking the first time Michigan was able to beat an Ivy League team.)

Due to the then-tradition of alumni coming back to assist their undergraduate teams in rivalry games, Cornell's coach Marshall Newell left for several weeks to assist Harvard in its rivalry game with Yale. As a captain, Warner was put in charge during the coach's absence. It was during this time that Warner came up with his first original play: Three backs who normally protected the rusher would fake a run to one side, while the quarterback kept the ball and would hand it to the runner, who now had an open field to run through on the other side. During the first in-game execution of the play, Warner carried the ball and was able to run clear for 25 yards. However, as Warner was a guard and not a runner, he was incorrectly holding the ball, and fumbled upon being tackled.

== Coaching career ==
=== Iowa State, Georgia and Cornell ===
In the spring of 1895, Warner was asked for a reference to fill the vacant head coaching position at Iowa Agricultural College, in Ames, Iowa. (Note: In 1895, the university was known as the Iowa Agricultural College and Model Farm.) Instead of giving a reference, Warner himself applied for the job and received an offer for $25 per week (equivalent to $970 in 2025). At the same time, he decided to apply to other schools and received an offer of $34 per week (equivalent to $1,320 in 2025) from the University of Georgia in Athens, Georgia. (Note: For a ten-week season ($340), equivalent to $13,200 in 2025. For the 1895–96 academic year, Georgia's entire student body consisted of 126 students.) Because Iowa State began its season in August—almost one and a half months prior to the beginning in Georgia—Warner was able to work out a deal. For $150 (equivalent to about $5,800 in 2025), he would coach in Iowa from August until the second week of September, and then head to Georgia and begin coaching there.

==== Iowa State ====
Ultimately, not only did Warner end up coaching at Iowa State before his time at Georgia; but while in Athens, he also received weekly updates from Iowa and sent back telegraphs with detailed advice for the following week. One story recounts that in the middle of September (just before leaving for Georgia), Warner took his team north west for a previously agreed-upon game against the Butte Athletic Club of Butte, Montana. Apparently overconfident, Warner bet the entire sum of his Iowa State wages—$150 (equivalent to about $5,800 in 2025)—on his team's victory. At halftime, his team trailed 10–2. Warner decided to enter the game, filling in at the guard position. Though this had a positive impact, it was not sufficient as his team still lost 12–10. In a 1947 publication by Francis J. Powers, there is an alternate take on the causes of the Butte loss: "The game was played on a field as devoid of grass as a glacier and there was nothing green ... It was impossible for the center to snap the ball to the quarterback on the bounce or even roll it without chances for a fumble ... Whenever Iowa State threatened to score, the referee (a home towner) would make a decision which chilled the Cyclones' offense ... spectators, who followed up and down the sidelines, would whip out their six shooters and blaze away with enthusiasm, which also chilled the Iowa college boys." In order to try and make up for losing all of his Iowa State wages, Warner worked out a deal where, for $30 (equivalent to about $1,200 in 2025), he would stay in contact with Iowa State while at Georgia.

Soon after Warner left for Georgia, Iowa State had its first official college game of the season. In Evanston, just north of Chicago, underdog Iowa State defeated Northwestern 36–0. A Chicago Tribune headline read, "Struck by a Cyclone". Since then, Iowa State teams have been known as the Cyclones. The team finished with three wins and three losses and, like Georgia, retained Warner for the following season. In 1896, Iowa State had eight wins and two losses. Despite leaving Georgia for Cornell in 1897, Warner remained head coach at Iowa State for another three years, posting winning records.

==== Georgia ====
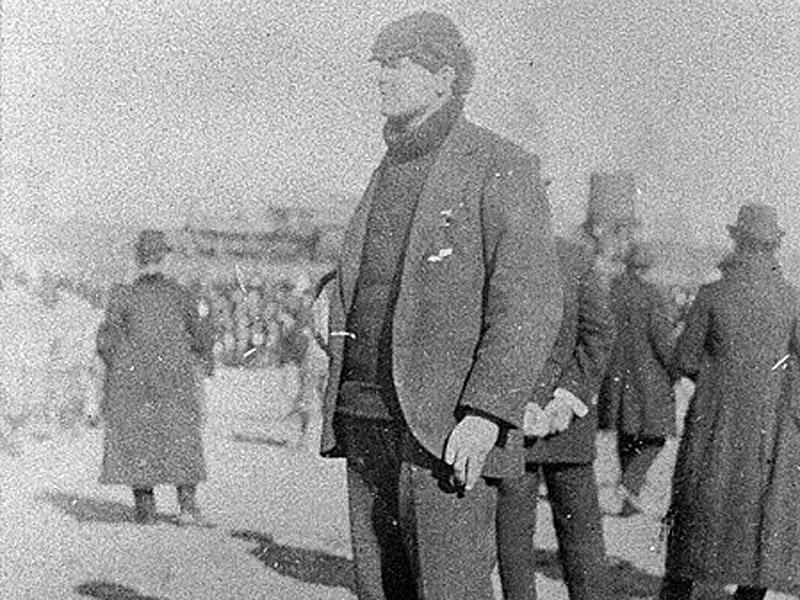
Warner on the Georgia sidelines

In Warner's first season at Georgia, he was hired at a salary of $34 per week. The school was a charter member of the Southern Intercollegiate Athletic Association (SIAA), the first athletic conference in the South. The football team had three wins and four losses, including a loss to North Carolina from a not-yet-legal forward pass. (Note: North Carolina was "in a punting situation and a Georgia rush seemed destined to block the ball. The punter (Joel Whitaker, out of desperation) with an impromptu dash to his right, tossed the ball and it was caught by George Stephens, who ran 70 yards for a touchdown." Warner complained to the referee that the play was illegal. However, the referee let the play stand because he did not see the pass. The teams played a second time and North Carolina won 10–6.) He was rehired at a salary of $40 per week, (Note: "I thought more of that contract than any I have ever received for coaching a football team" said Warner.) and the next season Georgia had one of the school's first great teams. With an undefeated record, the team won its first conference title. It also avenged the loss to North Carolina, winning 24–16, "For the first time in Southern football history the football supremacy of Virginia and North Carolina was successfully challenged."

During those two years Warner also played two games against John Heisman, another future coaching legend. Heisman was the head coach at Auburn University, and they faced each other in the 1895 and 1896 games of the "Deep South's Oldest Rivalry," an annual confrontation which has continued to the present day. In 1895, the Auburn Tigers defeated the Bulldogs 12–6. The Auburn team was led by quarterback Reynolds "Tick" Tichenor, known for his punt returns. Tichenor had executed the first "hidden-ball trick" in an earlier Auburn game against Vanderbilt, (Note: Auburn still lost to Vanderbilt 9–6, the first game in the south decided by a field goal.) and used it again against Georgia. The next year, Tichenor faced Georgia's Richard Von Albade Gammon, a star quarterback in his first year under Warner. Both quarterbacks played well and, unlike the previous year, Warner's team won 16–6. (Note: Richard Gammon died soon after the following season's game against the University of Virginia. Tichenor and Gammon played together in 1897 as Tichenor transferred to Georgia, taking Gammon's place as the starting quarterback, who shifted to fullback. In the game against Virginia, Gammon was playing defense and suffered a severe concussion after taking part in a tackle. With coaches' help Gammon was able to walk, but he lost his consciousness shortly after getting off the field. He remained unconscious and died early the next morning.) The second touchdown came right after the first onside kick in the South.

==== Cornell ====
After Georgia's outstanding 1896 performance, Warner returned to his alma mater Cornell at twice his Georgia salary. While remaining head coach at Iowa State, he coached Cornell to records of 5–3–1 in 1897 and 10–2 in 1898; in the latter season, Cornell outscored its opponents 296–29. Despite its 1898 success, tension existed within the team, as its assistant coach (backed by a large proportion of the players) lobbied to replace Warner. Acknowledging an issue with his leadership, Warner resigned.

===== Return to Cornell =====
In 1904, after five years at Carlisle (see below), Warner returned to Cornell but his 1904 team featuring Clemson transfer James Lynah was little improved over the previous year. The following two years were better, with the 1905 team losing to undefeated champion Penn by one point. Their game next year was a scoreless tie, and Cornell lost only one game that season (to Princeton).

=== Carlisle ===
After leaving Cornell the first time, Warner became head coach of the football team at Carlisle Indian Industrial School the first Native American boarding school. Its late-nineteenth- and early-twentieth-century football teams were nationally prominent, and Warner was paid $1,200 (equivalent to about $46,000 in 2025), an exceptionally high salary for a coach at the time.

His previous Cornell team had once faced Carlisle, and he had been impressed by his opponent's approach to the game. Since the players were outweighed by every other team in the nation, they relied on speed and agility instead of size and physical force. Despite those strengths, Cornell won the game 23 to 6. The referee was a former Cornell graduate and was accused of helping out Cornell during the game. After the match, while addressing the journalists, Warner acknowledged that there had been assistance from the referee. He stated that "We outscored 'em but we didn't defeat 'em, if you follow me." It has been said that after that game he considered Carlisle to be the future of college football.

The head coach dealt with young players who differed from the white, East-Coast students with whom he had previously worked. At the beginning, he used the then-customary coaching methods of rough language and a strict routine. The Native American students were unaccustomed to such an approach, and several key players stopped attending practices. Warner adjusted his technique, saying that he "found I could get better results. I don't think I ever swore at a player from that time. Maybe I did a little cussing, now and then, but never at players."

His coaching brought immediate improvement. In 1897 and 1898, the Carlisle teams had 6–4 records. In 1899 (Warner's first year), Carlisle won nine and lost two games—to the country's two best teams: Harvard and Princeton. That year saw Carlisle's first major victory, against one of the "Big Four" teams, (Note: The original term was the Big Three – the dominant programs of Harvard, Yale and Princeton. By the beginning of the century Penn also became considered one of the elite football schools.) beating Penn 16–5. At the end of the season, the school played Columbia at the Polo Grounds in New York City, a premier sports venue at the time, defeating them 42–0. (Note: Columbia had also previously upset one of the Big Four – having beaten Yale 5–0.) The Columbia game was the first time that a crouching start, a form of what is now known as a three point stance, was used by the running backs. Before Warner's innovation, the stance for a back before the ball was snapped was bent forward with his feet well apart and his hands on his knees. Warner realized that if his players took a stance similar to the one taken by sprinters, the legs would be bent, the back leaning forward, with one hand on the ground and the other arm cocked back to the thigh/hip region. Like with sprinters, this similar stance maximized the speed of his players. Shortly after, it became the standard football stance for both backs and linemen.

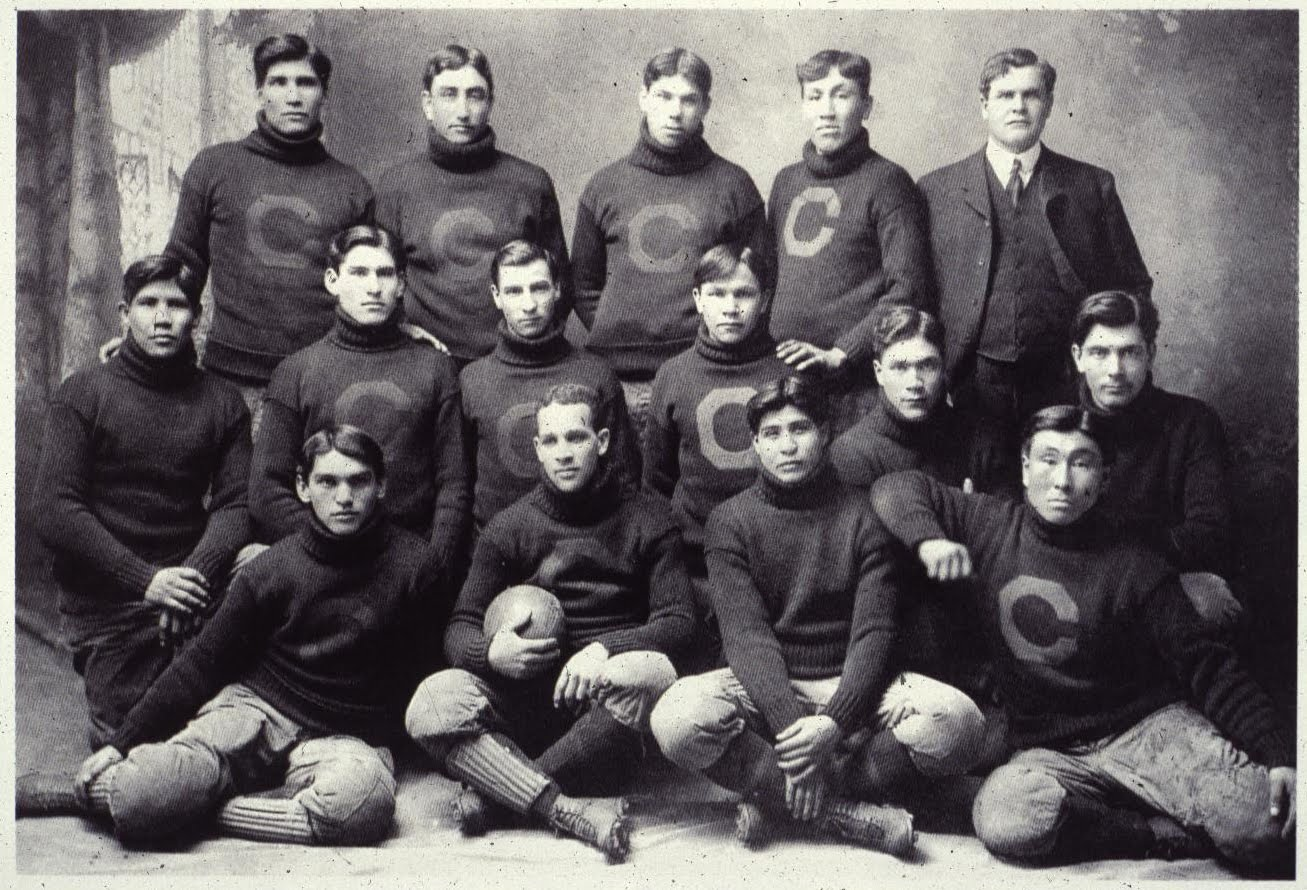
1903 Carlisle Indians, with Warner at top right

At the end of 1899, Warner was appointed the school's athletic director and his salary more than doubled. A track-and-field program was started that year. Warner knew little about the sport; to prepare as coach he bought every book available and consulted Jack Moakley and Mike Murphy, two of the era's leading head coaches. The program was successful; running was a Native American tradition, and students from the Southwest were known for their stamina in long-distance races.

Warner's next two years were less fruitful. The 1900 football team went 6–4–1, losing three games to the Big Four, and the 1901 season was a losing one, with Carlisle posting a 5–7–1 record. The following year, the team posted an improved 8–3 record, when Warner began implementing double (lateral) passes. Carlisle's quarterback Jimmy Johnson would make a lateral pass to the halfback running towards the sideline, bringing the defense with him as he tossed the ball back to the fast-running Johnson.

In 1902, Warner played one professional football game for the Syracuse Athletic Club during the first World Series of Football at Madison Square Garden. In the first professional indoor football game, Syracuse defeated the heavily favored New York team. During the series, Warner was seriously cut on the side of his head. Although he laughed it off at first, the injury turned out to be more serious and he was replaced with Blondy Wallace for the rest of the series. For the tournament, Warner and the other team members each earned $23 (equivalent to about $860 in 2025), although each player's expected share had been $300 (equivalent to about $11,000 in 2025); it was a financial failure.

Carlisle's 1903 season was a success, with only two losses. The 12–11 defeat by Harvard is known for the "hunch-back", or "hidden-ball", play which Warner learned from Heisman; he had a tailor sew elastic bands into the waists of several players' jerseys before the game so the play could be executed. It was used during a Harvard kickoff; when the ball was caught, Carlisle formed a circle around the returner and pushed the ball up the back of the player's (altered) jersey. Carlisle then broke the huddle and spread out in different directions. Each player except the returner (who had the hidden ball) pretended to carry the football. The ruse confused the Harvard players, who scrambled to find the ball carrier, and the returner (ignored, with both hands free) ran untouched into the end zone. Warner's next step was a brief return to Cornell.

==== Back to Carlisle ====
After three years at Cornell, Warner returned to Carlisle. He considered his second stint there his best. (Note: Warner was once asked by a reporter from the Carlisle Herald to name an all-time Carlisle football team. It included in the line: Albert Exendine, Martin Wheelock, Bemus Pierce, William Garlowe, Charles Dillon, Emil Hauser, Edward Rogers; and in the backfield: Jimmy Johnson, Jim Thorpe, Joe Guyon, and Pete Hauser.) From 1907 to 1914, the team won ten or more games a season five times.

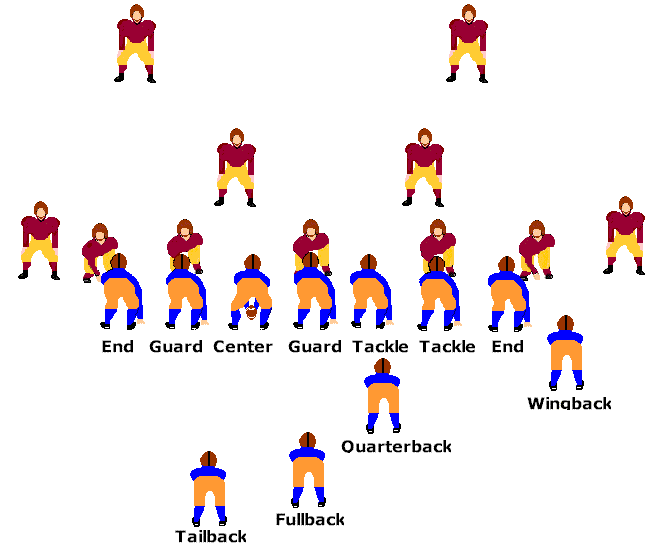
A single wing formation illustrated.

During this time at Carlisle, Warner made several significant contributions to football offense, including the body block technique and the single- and double-wingback formations. Under Warner, Carlisle quarterback Frank Mount Pleasant and fullback Pete Hauser became two of the first regular spiral passers in football (the forward pass was legalized in 1906). (Note: Warner credited Hauser with tossing the first one.) In 1908 he introduced the technique of body blocking, instead of blocking with the shoulders.

Warner considered the 1907 Carlisle team "about as perfect a football machine as I ever sent on the field". (Note: Quarterback Mount Pleasant was also on the 1904 and 1908 U.S. Olympic track and field teams, and at end was future member of the College Football Hall of Fame and future coach Albert Exendine.) The team posted a 10–1 record, outscored opponents 267–62 and pioneered an elegant, high-speed passing game; it was one of the first teams to regularly throw the ball deep downfield. For the first time in 11 years, Carlisle defeated Harvard on the road 23–15. Carlisle also won 26–6 over Penn. In the second play of the Penn game, Hauser threw a 40-yard spiral pass, hitting his receiver in stride. At the time such a pass was stunning and unexpected, and is considered by one journalist to be an evolutionary step in the game. The 1907 season is known for Warner's first use of the single-wing formation, characterized by laterals, trap and counter runs, and passing.

According to Sally Jenkins, in her Sports Illustrated article on Carlisle:

To take advantage of the Indians' versatility Warner drew up a new offense ..."the Carlisle formation," but later it would be known as the single wing. It was predicated on one small move: Warner shifted a halfback out wide, to outflank the opposing tackle, forming something that looked like a wing. It opened up a world of possibilities. The Indians could line up as if to punt – and then throw. No one would know whether they were going to run, pass or kick. For added measure Warner taught his quarterbacks to sprint out a few yards to their left or their right, buying more time to throw. The rest of the players flooded downfield and knocked down any opponent who might be able to intercept or bat away the pass.

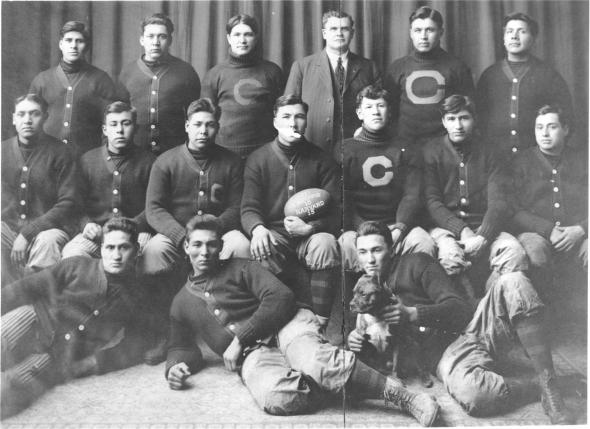
The 1911 Carlisle Indians pose with a game ball from their upset of Harvard

The 1907 team included a young Jim Thorpe, considered one of the greatest athletes who ever lived. Thorpe weighed just 155 lb (70 kg), light for a football player. Warner played him as a substitute, encouraging him to put his time into track and field. By 1909, Warner had Thorpe competing in track and field and he won 14 events. In 1911, Thorpe began training for the upcoming Olympics, and won gold medals in the pentathlon and decathlon at the 1912 Olympic Games in Stockholm. Thorpe’s Olympic victories in the pentathlon and decathlon at the 1912 Stockholm Games brought international attention to both Carlisle and Native American athletes; however, a year later the International Olympic Committee stripped him of his medals after it was revealed he had played semiprofessional baseball before the Games, violating the strict amateurism rules of the time, and only restored him as the sole champion in both events on the 110th anniversary of his victories in 2022. (Note: Lewis Tewanima, another Carlisle track and field athlete who competed in Stockholm where he won the silver medal in the 10,000 meter run, was considered a ward of the state with Thorpe. Warner was delegated to accompany them to the Olympics. Warner's 1907 quarterback Frank Mount Pleasant was also an Olympic athlete who competed in the 1908 Summer Olympics in London.)

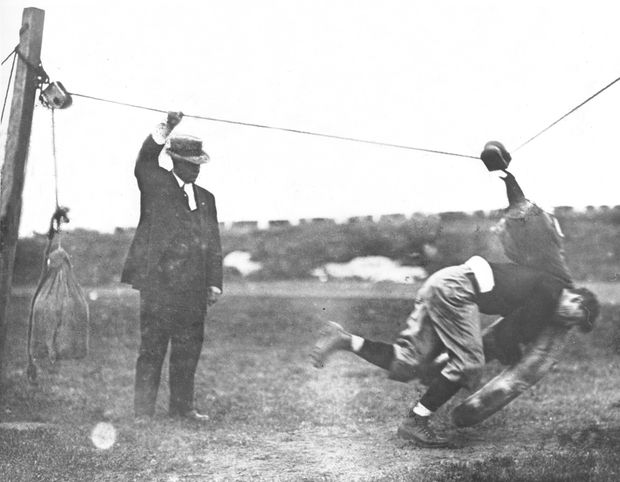
Jim Thorpe tackling a weighted dummy on a pulley with Warner supervising, 1912.

Carlisle football had another standout year in 1911, posting an 11–1 record. Thorpe had grown to 180 lb (82 kg), big enough to be a starter. The team defeated Harvard 18–15, with Thorpe scoring all of Carlisle's field goals. Walter Camp selected Thorpe as a first-team All-American. According to one source, Thorpe was "recognized as the greatest player of the year and a man whose kicking is likely to revolutionize the game".

Warner considered the 1912 team brilliant and adaptive, and experimented with new plays and formations. In its game against Army, Warner's team introduced a wrinkle to the wing-back system. According to Francis J. Powers, author of a book that concentrated on Warner's approach to football:

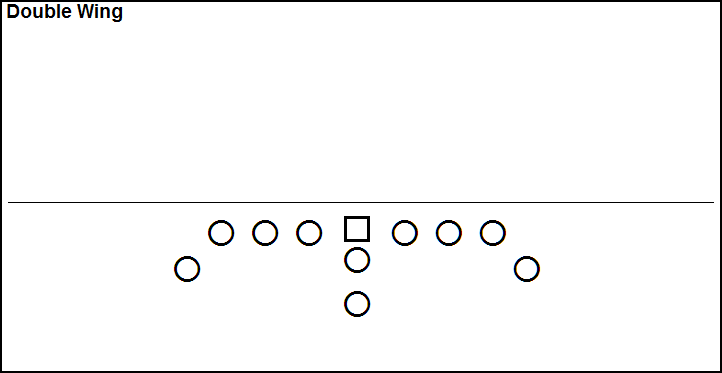
The double wing formation.

Warner had both halfbacks close to the line and flanking the defensive tackles. That was the start of the double wingback offense, which enjoyed tremendous popularity until the T formation was modernized with the man in motion. The double wing became the most effective of all systems for effective forward passing since it permitted the quick release of four receivers down the field.

Carlisle dominated the next two years, with the 1912 and 1913 teams losing only one game each. Warner's salary increased to $4,500 per season (equivalent to $150,000 in 2025).

In 1914 there was an administrative change in Washington, with federal money considered better spent in the Midwest than on schools like Carlisle. Many students left, and this affected the team (which had a 5–10–1 record). After that season, Warner left Carlisle to become head coach at Pittsburgh.

=== Pittsburgh ===
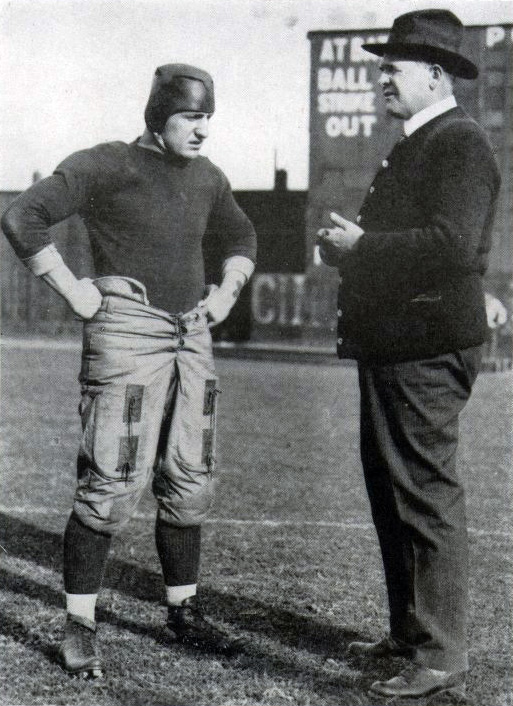
Warner and Pitt captain Bob Peck during the 1916 season.

When Warner arrived at the University of Pittsburgh in 1915, the 128-year-old school was on a new campus with 3,900 students. He inherited a team in good shape, full of future All-Americans, and coached the Pittsburgh Panthers to their first undefeated season. Six of their eight games (all shutouts) were played at home on Forbes Field, including a 45–0 victory over Carlisle. Warner coached his Pitt teams to 29 straight victories, and is credited with three national championships (1915, 1916 and 1918). Coaching Pittsburgh from 1915 to 1923, he compiled a 60–12–4 record.

Although the 1915 season was a success, the next year's team was one of the greatest of Warner's career. The Panthers were again undefeated and, like the previous year, six of the eight games were shutouts. Thirty-two of their 35 players were from Western Pennsylvania, near Pittsburgh. The team scored 255 points, conceding 25. Warner considered the team an improvement because its defense was more dominant than the previous year's. The Panthers were the consensus national champions, and Warner became recognized as one of football's greatest coaches.

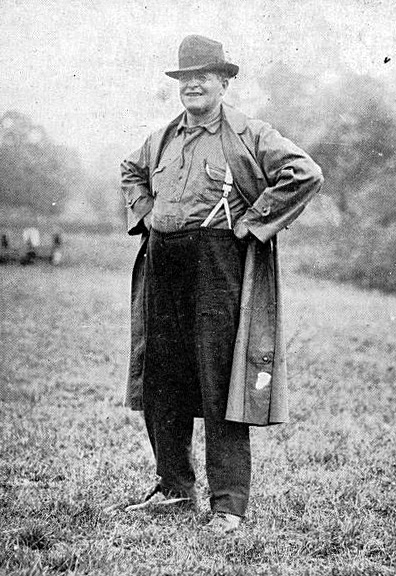
Warner during the 1917 season at Pittsburgh

In 1917 the United States entered World War I, and some players (including Andy Hastings and Jimmy Dehart) entered military service. Pittsburgh played an undefeated full season despite the war, although it was not awarded the national championship. (Note: The team was known as "The Fighting Dentists" because on occasion every position was filled by dental students.) Although the team lacked the previous year's punch, it dominated the opposition. A key aspect of its success was the opposing coaches' inability to address Warner's evolving strategies; according to Powers, "His reverse plays were a mystery, although Pop always was willing to explain them in detail to any other coach".

Faculties had to step in to stop a decisive, postseason national championship game with John Heisman's undefeated Georgia Tech team. The game was postponed until the following season, giving Tech the 1917 national championship (the first for any Southern school). On November 23, 1918, the two teams played at Pittsburgh. At the stadium the locker rooms were next to each other, with only a thin wall separating the two teams prior to the game. Heisman was first to begin an inspirational speech and it was said that he passionately described both heroes of Ancient Greece as well as the tragedy of a soldier found in his armor among the ruins of Pompeii. Because of Georgia Tech's players' silence the speech was crystal clear on the other side of the wall. Upon its finish Warner smiled and quietly told his players "Okay, boys. There's the speech. Now go out and knock them off." Pittsburgh defeated Georgia Tech 32–0.

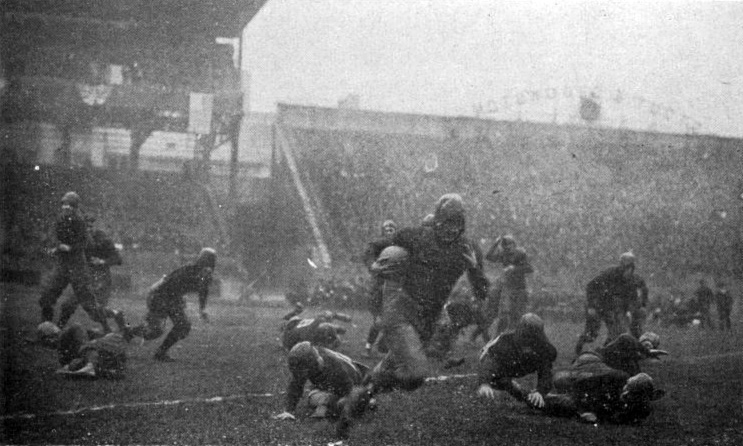
Tom Davies runs vs. Georgia Tech, 1918.

The 1918 season was cut short at the end of November due to the continuing effects of World War I and the influenza pandemic. Only five games were played, and the season's final game was in Cleveland against the Naval Reserve. Warner's first loss at Pitt, it was one of the most controversial games in school history. According to Warner and several reporters covering the game, Pitt was robbed by the officials. The referees said that the timekeeper's watch was broken, ended the first half before Pitt was able to score and allowed the Reserves extra time in the fourth quarter to pull ahead, 10–9. Although he refused to acknowledge the loss, (Note: According to Warner's timekeeper, the fourth quarter ran for 49 minutes and according to official statistics, there were 52 plays in the first half and 52 plays in the fourth quarter.) Warner's 29-game winning streak came to an end. Moon Ducote kicked the 41-yard, game-winning field goal for the Naval Reserve, and Warner called him "the greatest football player I ever saw". Despite the loss, a number of selectors named the 4–1 1918 Panthers national champion. The team was led by freshman running back Tom Davies, who averaged 150 yards per game over his four-year career.

The 1919 season began with high expectations; World War I was over, and key players had returned from service. However, things did not go Warner's way; at the beginning of the season, problems with the offensive line and on the flanks became apparent. Their first defeat was at Syracuse, where the Orangemen won 20–3. The 1919 Panthers had six wins, two losses and one tie.

They were undefeated in 1920, with ties against Syracuse and undefeated Penn State. In 1921 the team's record dipped to 5–3–1, but Pitt made college football history on October 8, 1921. Harold W. Arlin announced the first live radio broadcast of a college football game in the United States from Forbes Field on KDKA, as the Panthers defeated West Virginia 21–13 in the annual Backyard Brawl.

Although Warner announced before the 1922 season that he was leaving to take the head-coaching position at Stanford, he honored his contract and remained at Pitt through 1923. The 1922 team had an 8–2 record, and the season ended with the Panthers taking their first cross-country train trip to defeat Stanford 16–7 in Palo Alto (coached by two Pitt assistants, sent ahead by Warner). Andrew Kerr became head coach at Stanford during Warner's last two years at Pitt. Warner's final season was his worst at Pitt, as the Panthers stumbled to a 5–4 record in 1923. However, the Warner era ended on a high note with a 20–3 victory over Penn State on November 29.

=== Stanford ===
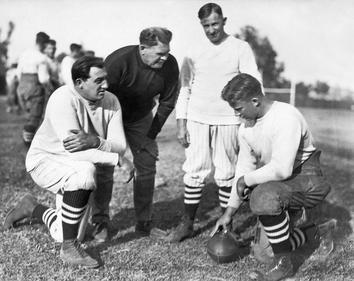
1924 Stanford team: line coach Claude E. Thornhill, Warner, assistant Andrew Kerr and team captain Jim Lawson.

Football on the Pacific Coast had been on the rise since the late 1910s. (Note: At the 1917 Rose Bowl, the University of Oregon defeated University of Pennsylvania 14 to 0. While at the 1920 Rose Bowl, Oregon lost to one of the recognized national champions, Harvard, by one point: 6 to 7. The next year, Andy Smith's University of California team beat an undefeated Ohio State 28 to 0, making California the widely agreed national champions of the 1920 season.) Early in 1922, Warner signed a contract with Stanford University in which he would begin coaching in 1924 (after his contract with Pitt expired). Health concerns, a significant pay raise and the rising status of Pacific Coast football made Warner make the big change. Years later, he wrote:

I felt my health would be better on the Pacific coast. Weather conditions at Pittsburgh during the football season are rather disagreeable, and much of the late season work had to be done upon a field which was ankle deep in mud. At the close of every season I would be in poor physical condition, twice being rendered incapable of coaching while I recuperated in a hospital. Doctors advised me that the climate of the Pacific coast would be much better for a man of my age and in the work in which I was engaged.

In 1924, Warner began his nine-year tenure at Stanford University. (Note: Stanford was founded in 1887 and had fielded a football team every year since 1892, with the exception of 1906 to 1918, when football was dropped due concerns over the sport's increasing numbers of injuries and deaths. Along with other west coast schools the sport of rugby was played instead.) When he began coaching, Stanford was one of nine teams in the Pacific Coast Conference (PCC). Warner inherited a notable squad from the previous year, including Ernie Nevers (whom Warner considered his greatest player) and All-American ends Ted Shipkey and Jim Lawson.

A season highlight was the final game against Stanford's arch-rival California at California Memorial Stadium, the last game of the regular season. Before the game, both teams were undefeated and Stanford had not beaten California since 1905. (Note: In 1906, concerned with the growing levels of violence in football, both schools stopped playing American football and switched to rugby as their university's main sport. California switched back to football in 1915, with Stanford waiting until 1919.) Nevers did not play due to a broken ankle. Late in the game, California was leading 20–3; California coach Andy Smith, sure the game was over, began substituting regular players. Warner seized the opportunity to combine passing with the trick plays for which he was known (a fake reverse and a full spinner), and Stanford made a comeback. The game ended in a 20–20 tie.

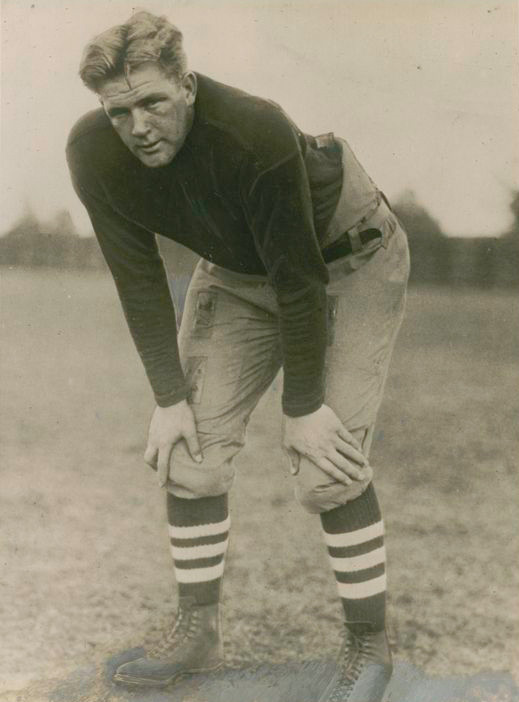
Ernie Nevers, whom Warner called his greatest player.

Because the game was California's second tie, Stanford was chosen to play in the Rose Bowl on New Year's Day against the University of Notre Dame's Fighting Irish coached by Knute Rockne. Like Warner, Rockne is considered one of the greatest coaches in football history. According to journalist Allison Danzig, "With the exception of Knute Rockne of Notre Dame, Pop Warner was the most publicized coach in football." The game was thus a test of two different and highly influential systems of football: "the Warner system with the wing backs, unbalanced line and gigantic power [and the] Knute Rockne system with its rhythmic, dancing shift, lightning speed, balanced line and finely timed blocking". Notre Dame's backfield was composed of the renowned Four Horsemen. Nevers played all 60 minutes of the game, and rushed for 114 yards, more yardage than the Four Horsemen combined. Warner's offense moved the ball but was unable to score, and Notre Dame won 27–10.

During the 1925 season, Stanford lost just one PCC game (to Washington); California was finally defeated, 27–7. It was the first year of a new rivalry, with coach Howard Jones and the University of Southern California (USC) team. (Note: Jones won 1921 and 1922 Big Ten conference titles while heading the University of Iowa.) In their first game, at the Los Angeles Memorial Colosseum, Stanford scored twice in the first half but had to hold off the charging Trojans in a 13–9 win. Because of the loss to Washington, Warner's team was not invited to the Rose Bowl.

Stanford won all its 1926 games, crushing California 41–7 and narrowly defeating USC 13–12. Warner's team was invited to the Rose Bowl to play Alabama. Like the game against the Fighting Irish, Stanford dominated but the result was a 7–7 tie. After the game, both teams were recognized as national champions by a number of publications. (Note: Parke H. Davis selected the Lafayette Leopards, coached by Herb McCracken, Warner's former player at Pittsburgh, as national champion.)

The 1927 season was one of underachievement and ultimate success. Stanford lost its third game to non-conference St. Mary's College. Stanford's next loss was against non-conference Santa Clara. The game against USC was a 13–13 tie.

However, that year, Stanford defeated California 13–6. The game included a bootleg play, the invention of which some credit to Warner. Powers stated that,

Stanford put the game on ice in the fourth period when Pop introduced the bootlegger play, which was to be widely copied and still is in use. On the original bootlegger, Warner made use of Biff Hoffman's tremendous hands. Hoffman would take the pass from center and then fake to another back. Keeping the ball, he would hide it behind him and run as though he had given it to a teammate. Sometimes defensive players would step out of Hoffman's path, thinking he was going to block. Hoffman "bootlegged" for the touchdown against California ...

Despite the two losses, Stanford finished the season as PCC co-champion. They were invited to the 1928 Rose Bowl against Pitt, Warner's former team now coached by protégé Jock Sutherland. Warner broke his losing Rose Bowl streak, defeating Sutherland 7–6. The win was Warner's last appearance at the Rose Bowl. In recognition of his Rose Bowl accomplishments, Warner was inducted into the Rose Bowl Hall of Fame in 2018.

The 1929 season is known for Warner's regular use of the hook and lateral, a play that involves a receiver who runs a curl pattern, catches a short pass and immediately laterals the ball to another receiver running a crossing route. According to the October 25, 1929 Stanford Daily, "The trickiness that Pop Warner made famous in his spin plays and passing is very evident ... The frosh have been drilling all week on fast, deceptive forward and lateral pass plays, and together with the reverses will have a widely varied attack". That season brought Warner his second straight loss to Jones, with Stanford defeated by the Trojans 7–0. USC won the conference, and went to the Rose Bowl. Jones went on to win every year thereafter, including 1932, Warner's last season at Stanford. Because of the five consecutive defeats, Warner was severely criticized by Stanford alumni. (Note: During Warner's latter years at Stanford, USC became the undisputed leader of the west, winning multiple national championships.) In all, Warner and Jones played eight games; Jones won five, Warner two and one was a tie. Against Stanford's main rival, California, Warner won five games, tied three and lost one.

=== Temple ===
Warner left Stanford for Temple University in Philadelphia, his final head-coaching job, after the 1932 season. (Note: Stanford replaced Warner with Claude "Tiny" Thornhill, his assistant coach and also one of his star players at Pittsburgh, for the 1933 season. That season Stanford beat USC 13–7, ending the Trojans' 23-game unbeaten streak. Stanford won the PCC and played in the Rose Bowl, but lost there to Columbia 7–0.) He was paid $75,000 for five years (equivalent to $1.9 million in 2025), one of the largest salaries ever offered a coach at the time. The 1934 team was undefeated during the regular season, losing to Tulane in the first Sugar Bowl. A star of the game was Dave Smukler, whom Warner considered one of his great fullbacks.

In later years Warner said he regretted his decision to leave Stanford for Temple. He left because of concern about the school's changing funding priorities. The university leadership was planning to make Stanford primarily a graduate school; because of an increase in the number of junior colleges in California, the administration saw less need for undergraduate instruction at Stanford. Because fewer students were admitted, higher grade requirements for incoming students made admission more difficult and student athletes began enrolling at USC and California instead of Stanford. Warner soon realized that he had made the wrong decision; due to the economic effects of the Great Depression, the number of applicants to Stanford decreased significantly and athletes were again admitted. Temple upset the Florida Gators, coached by future Temple coach Josh Cody, 20–12 in Warner's last game.

=== San Jose State ===
While coaching at Temple, Warner continued living in Palo Alto (where Stanford is located). After his 1938 retirement he was immediately recruited as an advisor to Dudley DeGroot, a former center at Stanford and now the head coach at San Jose State College (near Palo Alto). Officially an advisor, Warner was immediately put in charge of the offense. According to Powers, "DeGroot had been using a single back offense but Pop immediately changed to the double wing, much to the doubts of San Jose players. However, the formation began to click and San Jose not only enjoyed an undefeated season but was the highest scoring team in the nation." That year the San Jose State Spartans played against College of the Pacific, coached by Amos Alonzo Stagg. It was the first time the two coaches had met since 1907, when Warner was coaching Carlisle and defeated Stagg's University of Chicago 18–4. Warner and DeGroot's San Jose State defeated Stagg's Pacific Tigers, 39–0.

== Personal life and death ==
Warner married the former Tibb Lorraine Smith in Springville on June 1, 1899. He smoked Turkish Trophy cigarettes and drank so much alcohol; his trainers were instructed to supply him with "cough medicine". Warner enjoyed painting in watercolors and used the funds from his paintings to pay for his law school education at Cornell. He also had a woodworking shop in his garage.

Warner retired from San Jose State (and coaching) in 1940. Warner died on September 7, 1954, at age 83 in Palo Alto from throat cancer.

== Coaching legacy ==
For his contributions to football, the American Football Coaches Association (AFCA) gave Warner its Amos Alonzo Stagg Award in 1948.

His name is widely known for the Pop Warner Little Scholars program, which began in 1929 as the Junior Football Conference in Philadelphia to keep children busy and out of trouble. In 1934, soon after Warner joined Temple, he agreed to the program's renaming as the Pop Warner Conference, which still endures. As of 2016, about 325,000 children between the ages of 5 and 16 are mentored.

=== Innovation ===
Andrew Kerr, who was an assistant to Warner at Pittsburgh and Stanford, said he considered Warner "the greatest creative genius in American football." Morris Bishop, a Cornell professor of history, wrote that Warner "caused more rule changes than all the other coaches combined."

Warner invented the single and double wing formations, the three-point stance, and the modern body block technique. He introduced several plays, such as the trap run, the bootleg, the naked reverse, and the screen pass. He was among the first to use the huddle, to number plays, and to teach the spiral pass and spiral punt. He improved shoulder and thigh pads; and was the first to utilize adjustable fiber, rather than cotton. He also had his own helmet color-coding: red for backs and white for ends.

=== Coaching tree ===
Warner's coaching tree includes:

1. Charley Bowser, a Pitt end, coached at his alma mater.
2. Doc Carlson, also a star in basketball, became Pitt's basketball coach and led the team to the national championship.
3. Tom Davies, a back at Pitt, coached at Geneva and Allegheny.
4. James DeHart, a Pitt quarterback, became head coach at Washington and Lee and Duke Universities.
5. Dudley DeGroot, a center at Stanford, was the coach at San Jose State when Warner was an advisory coach. Later in his career, DeGroot was head coach of the NFL's Washington Redskins.
6. William Henry Dietz, a Carlisle tackle, coached at Washington State and Haskell and was the first coach of the Washington Redskins of the NFL.
7. Katy Easterday, a Pitt back, coached at Waynesburg.
8. Albert Exendine, a Carlisle end, coached at several universities (including Georgetown).
9. Skip Gougler, a Pitt back, assisted at his alma mater.
10. Andy Gustafson, a Pitt back, coached at VPI and the University of Miami.
11. Joe Guyon, a Carlisle back, coached at Union College.
12. Harvey Harman, a Pitt tackle, coached at Penn and Rutgers.
13. Pat Herron, a Pitt end, coached at Indiana and Duke.
14. Orville Hewitt, Pitt fullback who was an assistant at Alabama.
15. Jimmy Johnson, Carlisle quarterback, assisted at his alma mater.
16. Andy Kerr, Warner's assistant, coached at Colgate and preceded Warner as head coach at Stanford before Warner (still under contract at Pitt) arrived for the 1924 season. Kerr would later coach at Washington & Jefferson and Lebanon Valley.
17. Herb McCracken, a Pitt back, coached at Allegheny and Lafayette.
18. George 'Tank' McLaren, a two-time All-American, was a head coach for ten years after graduation at Emporia State, Arkansas, Cincinnati and Wyoming.
19. Charley Moran, a Carlisle assistant, coached at Texas A&M and Centre.
20. Frank Mount Pleasant, a Carlisle quarterback, coached at West Virginia Wesleyan and Buffalo.
21. Rufus B. Nalley, a Georgia back, coached at the Georgia Institute of Technology.
22. Ernie Nevers, a Stanford back, coached the NFL's Duluth Eskimos and Chicago Cardinals.
23. Bill Newman, center at Cornell who also assisted at Carlisle, coached at Georgetown.
24. Bob Peck, a Pitt center, was athletic director at Culver Military Academy.
25. Bemus Pierce, a Carlisle guard, coached at his alma mater and Buffalo.
26. Daniel A. Reed, a Cornell guard, coached at Cincinnati and Penn State.
27. Don Robesky, Stanford guard, was a line coach at Bakersfield College.
28. Eddie Rogers, a Carlisle end, coached at his alma mater.
29. Harry Shipkey, a Stanford player, coached freshman football at his alma mater.
30. Ted Shipkey, a Stanford end, coached for Arizona State and New Mexico.
31. Dale Sies, a Pitt guard, coached the Rock Island Independents.
32. Chuck Smalling, a Stanford fullback, assisted at Ole Miss.
33. Jake Stahl, a Pitt guard, coached at Duquesne.
34. Jock Sutherland, a Pitt end who became head coach (replacing Warner in 1924), coached Pitt for the next 14 years and later headed the Pittsburgh Steelers.
35. Fred H. Swan, a Stanford guard, coached at Temple.
36. Edwin Sweetland, a Cornell tackle, coached at several universities (including Kentucky and Syracuse).
37. Tiny Thornhill, a Pitt tackle, became a coach at Stanford.
38. Jim Thorpe, a Carlisle back, coached the Canton Bulldogs and was the first president of the National Football League.
39. Ed Walker, an end at Stanford, coached at Ole Miss.
40. Edgar Wingard, who assisted Warner at Carlisle, coached at Maine.
41. Frank Wilton, a Stanford back, coached at Miami (Ohio).

== Head coaching record ==
=== Football ===
Year	Team	Overall	Conference	Standing	Bowl/playoffs
Georgia Bulldogs (Southern Intercollegiate Athletic Association) (1895–1896)
1895	Georgia	3–4	2–2	3rd	
1896	Georgia	4–0	2–0	T–1st	
Georgia:		7–4	2–4		
Cornell Big Red (Independent) (1897–1898)
1897	Cornell	5–3–1			
1898	Cornell	10–2			
Carlisle Indians (Independent) (1899–1903)
1899	Carlisle	9–2			
1900	Carlisle	6–4–1			
1901	Carlisle	5–7–1			
1902	Carlisle	8–3			
1903	Carlisle	11–2–1			
Cornell Big Red (Independent) (1904–1906)
1904	Cornell	7–3			
1905	Cornell	6–4			
1906	Cornell	8–1–2			
Cornell:		36–13–3			
Carlisle Indians (Independent) (1907–1914)
1907	Carlisle	10–1			
1908	Carlisle	11–2–1			
1909	Carlisle	8–3–1			
1910	Carlisle	8–6			
1911	Carlisle	11–1			
1912	Carlisle	12–1–1			
1913	Carlisle	10–1–1			
1914	Carlisle	5–9–1			
Carlisle:		114–42–8			
Pittsburgh Panthers (Independent) (1915–1923)
1915	Pittsburgh	8–0			
1916	Pittsburgh	8–0			
1917	Pittsburgh	10–0			
1918	Pittsburgh	4–1			
1919	Pittsburgh	6–2–1			
1920	Pittsburgh	6–0–2			
1921	Pittsburgh	5–3–1			
1922	Pittsburgh	8–2			
1923	Pittsburgh	5–4			
Pittsburgh:		60–12–4			
Stanford Indians (Pacific Coast Conference) (1924–1932)
1924	Stanford	7–1–1	3–0–1	T–1st	L Rose
1925	Stanford	7–2	4–1	2nd	
1926	Stanford	10–0–1	4–0	1st	T Rose
1927	Stanford	8–2–1	4–0–1	T–1st	W Rose
1928	Stanford	8–3–1	4–1–1	3rd	
1929	Stanford	9–2	5–1	T–1st	
1930	Stanford	9–1–1	4–1	3rd	
1931	Stanford	7–2–2	2–2–1	T–5th	
1932	Stanford	6–4–1	1–3–1	7th	
Stanford:		71–17–8	31–9–5		
Temple Owls (Independent) (1933–1938)
1933	Temple	5–3			
1934	Temple	7–1–2			L Sugar
1935	Temple	7–3			
1936	Temple	6–3–2			
1937	Temple	3–2–4			
1938	Temple	3–6–1			
Temple:		31–18–9			
Total:		319–106–32			
National championship Conference title Conference division title or championship game berth

== See also ==
- List of college football career coaching wins leaders
- List of college football head coaches with non-consecutive tenure
- Pop Warner Trophy

== Sources ==
- Anderson, Lars (2007). Carlisle versus Army: Jim Thorpe, Dwight Eisenhower, Pop Warner, and the forgotten story of football's greatest battle. Random House. ISBN 978-1-4000-6600-1.
- Balthasar, Joel D. (2004). Pop Warner Little Scholars. Arcadia Publishing. ISBN 978-0-7385-3505-0.
- Bishop, Morris (September 9, 2014). A History of Cornell. Cornell University Press. ISBN 978-0-8014-5537-7.
- Bowling, Lewis (August 28, 2012). Alabama Football Tales. Arcadia Publishing. ISBN 978-1-61423-663-4.
- Bynum, Mike; Sciullo Jr., Sam; Eldridge Jr., Larry (1994). Greatest Moments in Pitt Football History. Nashville, TN: Athlon Sports Communications. ISBN 9781878839046.
- Cook, William (2011). Jim Thorpe: A Biography. McFarland. ISBN 978-0-7864-8577-2.
- Crawford, Bill (October 18, 2004). All American: The Rise and Fall of Jim Thorpe. Wiley. ISBN 978-0-471-55732-6.
- Danzig, Allison (1956). The History of American Football: Its Great Teams, Players, and Coaches. Englewood Cliffs, NJ: Prentice-Hall.
- Edwards, William Hanford (1916). Football Days: Memories of the Game and of the Men Behind the Ball. Moffat, Yard, and Company.
- Garbin, Patrick (2008). About Them Dawgs. Scarecrow Press. ISBN 978-0-8108-6040-7.
- Iowa State University (2006). Iowa State Cyclone Football (PDF). Archived from the original (PDF) on December 3, 2020.
- King, C. Richard (2015). Native Americans In Sports. Routledge. ISBN 978-1-317-46403-7.
- Kurz, Bob (1983). Miami of Ohio, the Cradle of Coaches. Troy Daily News.
- Long, Howie (May 26, 2015). Football for Dummies. John Wiley & Sons. ISBN 978-1-119-02263-3.
- Manchester, Alan V. (2012). Springville. Arcadia Publishing. ISBN 978-0-7385-9157-5.
- Menke, Frank G. (1950). The All-Sports Record Book. A. S. Barnes & Co.
- Miller, Jeffrey J. (August 3, 2015). Pop Warner. McFarland. ISBN 978-1-4766-2274-3.
- National Collegiate Athletic Association (2007). Official 2007 NCAA Division I Records Book (PDF).
- National Collegiate Athletic Association (August 2009). Official 2009 NCAA Division I Football Records Book (PDF). Indianapolis, Indiana: NCAA.
- National Collegiate Athletic Association (2015). NCAA Division I Football Records (PDF). NCAA.
- Nelson, David M. (1994). The Anatomy of a Game. University of Delaware Press. ISBN 978-0-87413-455-1.
- Otto, J. R. (1969). Football. Taylor & Francis.
- Pope, Edwin (1956). Football's Greatest Coaches. Tupper and Love.
- Powers, Francis J. (1969). Life Story of Glen S. (Pop) Warner, Gridiron's Greatest Strategist. Chicago, IL: The Athletic Institute.
- Reed, Thomas Walter (1949). History of the University of Georgia. Athens, GA: University of Georgia Press.
- Roza, Greg (September 18, 2008). Football in the SEC. Read How You Want. ISBN 978-1-4042-1919-9.
- Sciullo, Sam Jr., ed. (1991). Pitt Football: University of Pittsburgh Football Media Guide. Pittsburgh, PA: University of Pittsburgh Sports Information Office.
- Sciullo, Sam Jr. (2008). University of Pittsburgh Football Vault: The History of the Panthers. Atlanta, GA: Whitman Publishing. ISBN 978-0-7948-2653-6.
- University of Pittsburgh (2005). Record Book. Archived from the original on December 3, 2005.
- Stanly, Gregory Kent (1996). Before Big Blue – Sports at the University of Kentucky 1880–1940. The University Press of Kentucky. ISBN 978-0-8131-1991-5.
- Stegeman, John F. (2006). Echoes of Georgia Football: The Greatest Stories Ever Told. Triumph Books. ISBN 978-1-61749-048-4.
- Walsh, Christopher J. (July 18, 2006). Where Football Is King. Taylor Trade Publishing. ISBN 978-1-4617-3477-2.
- Warner, Glenn Scobey (1912). A course in football for players and coaches. Carlisle, Pennsylvania: Harvard University.
- Whittingham, Richard (2001). Rites of Autumn. Simon and Schuster. ISBN 978-0-7432-2219-8.
- Woodruff, Fuzzy (1928a). A History of Southern Football 1890–1928. Vol. 1.
- Woodruff, Fuzzy (1928b). A History of Southern Football 1890–1928. Vol. 2.
