= 1912 Carlisle Indians football team =

American college football season

1912 Carlisle Indians football
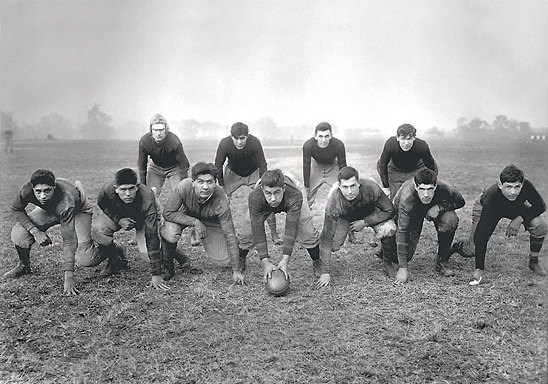
- Conference: Independent
- Record: 12–1–1
- Head coach: Pop Warner (11th season)
- Captain: Jim Thorpe
- Home stadium: Indian Field

1912 Eastern college football independents records
	Conf.			Overall
Team	W	L	T	W		L		T
Harvard		–		9	–	0	–	0
Penn State		–		8	–	0	–	0
Carlisle		–		12	–	1	–	1
Princeton		–		7	–	1	–	1
Swarthmore		–		7	–	1	–	1
Yale		–		7	–	1	–	1
Lehigh		–		9	–	2	–	0
Dartmouth		–		7	–	2	–	0
Wesleyan		–		7	–	2	–	0
Colgate		–		5	–	2	–	0
Washington & Jefferson		–		8	–	3	–	1
Rhode Island State		–		6	–	3	–	0
Bucknell		–		6	–	3	–	1
Temple		–		3	–	2	–	0
Penn		–		7	–	4	–	0
Army		–		5	–	3	–	0
Brown		–		6	–	4	–	0
Franklin & Marshall		–		6	–	4	–	0
Holy Cross		–		4	–	3	–	1
Rutgers		–		5	–	4	–	0
Tufts		–		5	–	4	–	0
Fordham		–		4	–	4	–	0
Villanova		–		3	–	3	–	0
Lafayette		–		4	–	5	–	1
Syracuse		–		4	–	5	–	0
Carnegie Tech		–		3	–	4	–	1
New Hampshire		–		3	–	4	–	1
Geneva		–		3	–	4	–	0
Vermont		–		3	–	5	–	0
Pittsburgh		–		3	–	6	–	0
Boston College		–		2	–	4	–	1
Cornell		–		3	–	7	–	0
NYU		–		2	–	6	–	0

The 1912 Carlisle Indians football team represented the Carlisle Indian Industrial School as an independent during the 1912 college football season. Led by 11th-year head coach Pop Warner, the Indians compiled a record of 12–1–1 and outscored opponents 454 to 120, leading the nation in scoring. It featured the Hall of Famers Jim Thorpe, Joe Guyon, and Gus Welch. Dwight D. Eisenhower was a halfback on the Army team defeated by Carlisle.

The 1912 season included many rule changes such as the 100-yard field and the 6-point touchdown. The first six-point touchdowns were registered in Carlisle's 50–7 win over Albright College on September 21.

== Schedule ==
Date	Opponent	Site	Result	Attendance	Source
September 21	Albright	Indian Field; Carlisle, PA	W 50–7		
September 25	Lebanon Valley	Indian Field; Carlisle, PA	W 45–0		
September 28	Dickinson	Indian Field; Carlisle, PA	W 32–0		
October 2	Villanova	Harrisburg, PA	W 65–0		
October 5	at Washington & Jefferson	Washington, PA	T 0–0	10,000	
October 12	at Syracuse	Archbold Stadium; Syracuse, NY	W 33–0		
October 19	at Pittsburgh	Forbes Field; Pittsburgh, PA	W 45–8	10,000	
October 26	at Georgetown	Georgetown Field; Washington, DC	W 34–20		
October 28	at Toronto All-Stars	Toronto, ON	W 49–7		
November 2	at Lehigh	Lehigh Field; Bethlehem, PA	W 34–14		
November 9	at Army	The Plain; West Point, NY	W 27–6		
November 16	at Penn	Franklin Field; Philadelphia, PA	L 26–34		
November 23	at Springfield YMCA	Springfield, MA	W 30–24		
November 28	at Brown	Andrews Field; Providence, RI	W 32–0		

== Players ==
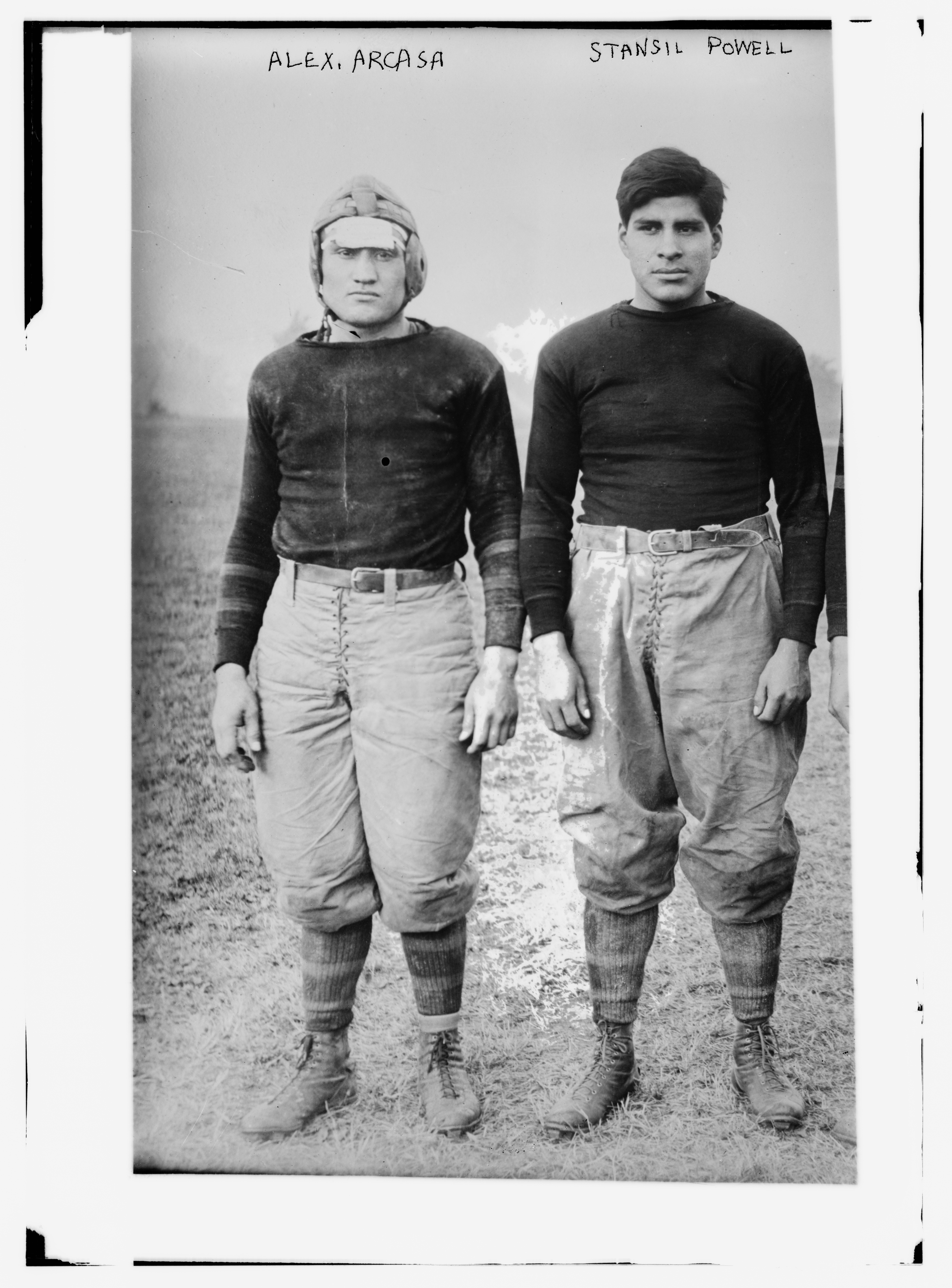
Alex Arcasa and Possum Powell.

=== Line ===
Player	Position	Games started	Hometown	Height	Weight	Age
Joseph Bergie	center			5'9"	168	20
Elmer Busch	guard		Potter Valley, California	5'10"	186	22
Pete Calac	tackle		Fallbrook, California	5'10	178	19
William Garlowe	guard			5'7"	173	
Joe Guyon	tackle		White Earth, Minnesota	5'10"	178	
Roy Large	end			5'8"	148	19
George Vetterneck	end			5'6"	140	

=== Backfield ===
Player	Position	Games started	Hometown	Height	Weight	Age
Alex Arcasa	halfback			5'8"	156	21
Stancil "Possum" Powell	fullback			5'10"	176	
Jim Thorpe	halfback		Stroud, Oklahoma	6'1"	180	
Gus Welch	quarterback		Spooner, Wisconsin	5'11"	152	21
