= Bemus Pierce =

American football player and coach (1875–1957)

Biographical details
- Born: February 27, 1875; Cattaraugus Reservation, Erie County, New York, U.S.
- Died: February 15, 1957 (aged 81); Loma Linda, California, U.S.

Playing career

Football
- 1894–1898: Carlisle
- 1899–1901: Homestead Library & Athletic Club
- 1902–1903: Sherman Institute
- Dec 1902–Jan 1903: All-Syracuse
- 1904 (November 26): Carlisle
- Position: Guard

Coaching career (HC unless noted)

Football
- 1899: Buffalo
- 1902–1903: Sherman Institute
- 1906: Carlisle
- 1907: Haskell
- 1908–1910: Kenyon
- 1911: Lafayette HS (NY)

Head coaching record
- Overall: 31–20–3 (college football)

Bemus Pierce (February 27, 1875 – February 15, 1957) was an American football player and coach. He played as a guard in the 1890s and 1900s. Pierce played college football for the Carlisle Indian School teams from 1894 to 1898 and played professional football for the championship teams from the Homestead Library & Athletic Club of 1900 and 1901. He also played for the All-Syracuse team in 1902, the first indoor professional football team. Pierce served as the head football coach at the University of Buffalo in 1899, at the Carlisle Indian School in 1906, and at Kenyon College from 1908 to 1910.

== Background and personal life ==
Bemus Pierce, a member of the Seneca nation, was born on February 23 or 28, 1873 on the Cattaraugus Reservation, Erie County, New York. He married Annie Gesis, a fellow Carlisle student, also from Cattaraugus, in April 1899 in the local Episcopal Church. Together they had three children.

== College ==
He attended the Carlisle Indian School where he played on the first great Carlisle football teams from 1894 to 1898. Pierce was a large player for the 1890s at six-feet, one and one-half inches, and 225 pounds. He was selected as captain of the Carlisle football teams of 1895, 1896, and 1897. He also became Carlisle's first All-American as a lineman in 1896. In an 1896 game between Carlisle and Illinois played in Chicago, Pierce returned three kick-offs for touchdowns.

At Carlisle, Pierce was teammates with his brother Hawley Pierce. The two brothers, each weighing over 200 pounds, were both among the best players of their day. In 1906, The Washington Post declared them the greatest pair of linesman brothers in the history of the sport:

"But the greatest pair of brother linesmen were the Indians, Pierce. Bemus Pierce and Hawley Pierce were right guard and left tackle in the Carlisle line in the old days when the redskin booters of the prolate had everything in the country scared. Two hundred pounds apiece they weighed, and they won games for their team in 97. Tackle back and guard back for a solid half was the Indian play and it was 400 pounds of Pierce into the opponents' line pretty steady. Bemus was captain of the team and one of the best men on the kick-off football has seen. He could measure and place his kicks accurately and every red knew where the ball was going before it soared."

During a game against Penn, Pierce faced off against Alfred E. Bull. Bull and Pierce faced each other on the line throughout the game, and on a play late in the game Pierce sent Bull to the ground, and the play went over him. After the play, Pierce cried out to the Penn players, "Look, look at Sitting Bull."

In 1919, more than 20 years after Pierce played his last college football game, one sports writer cited him as perhaps the greatest lineman of all time:

"When the great line men are discussed in these days and times, some of the veterans of football hark back to the days of Carlisle's glory on the gridiron and speak of the mighty Bemus Pierce. Pierce played with his brothers, Jerry and Hawley, on the same team ... Bemus Pierce scaled nearly 225 pounds, but he was tall and solid as a rock. Despite his great bulk he was fast as a streak, and no line player of recent years has shown more real ability."

Even after the successes of Carlisle's later stars Jim Thorpe, Joe Guyon and Albert Exendine, sports columnist Lawrence Perry opined in 1923 that Bemus Pierce was the greatest of all the American Indian football stars:

"But of all indian footballers old Bemus Pierce stands first in the affections of those who played against him. Bemus in the opinion of Princeton and Harvard opponents, was one of the greatest linemen that ever stood on a football field. Foster Sanford agrees with this and Foster knows a lineman when he sees one."

== Professional football ==
Pierce went on to play professional football in the early years of the sport. He played for Homestead in 1899 and then Bemus and Hawley Pierce played together on the line of the famous 1900 and 1901 Homestead Library & Athletic Club football team, the latter of which won the professional football championship of 1901.

In December 1902 and January 1903, Bemus and Hawley Pierce helped the All-Syracuse football team win the World Series of Football. On December 29, 1902, the Pierce brothers played in what was billed as the first professional football game played in New York City. The game, played in front of 3,500 spectators at Madison Square Garden, matched the All-Syracuse team featuring the Pierce Brothers and Pop Warner against a local New York City team.

The wood flooring of the arena was pulled up, and a gridiron was laid out on dirt, with a field 70 yards long and 35 yards wide. A newspaper from Syracuse credited the Pierce brothers with playing to win. Pop Warner and Bemus Pierce were credited with "tearing great holes in the Gotham line." And on offense, the paper wrote that "Bemus Pierce hurdled like a racehorse for distance." "Another interesting chapter occurred when the temper of Bemus Pierce was aroused and he threatened to mix it up with everybody in general."

On New Year's Eve 1902, the Pierce brothers made several big gains as Syracuse defeated the Knickerbocker Athletic Club with a score of 36 points. The championship game was held at Madison Square Garden in New York City, and Syracuse defeated the Orange Athletic Club by a score of 36 to 0. Bemus was unable to finish the game after he was kicked in the face during a scrimmage resulting in a badly broken nose. His brother Hawley, however, scored a touchdown for the All-Syracuse team.

== Coaching career ==
After retiring as a player, Pierce became a football coach. He coached the University of Buffalo football team in 1899 and gave that institution one of the best football teams it ever had. This likely made him the first Native head coach in college football. After spending the 1900 and 1901 seasons playing professional football for Homesetead, Pierce worked at the Sherman Institute at Riverside, California from 1902 to 1903. Pierce introduced football to the Sherman Institute, as the sport was new in the west. The team he coached was the Sherman Institute Braves. Photos and records of this team are part of the Sherman Indian Museum today. Pierce played on the Sherman teams that he coached in 1902 and 1903.

In 1904, Pierce was hired as an assistant football coach at Carlisle under head coach Eddie Rogers. The 1904 season marked the first time the Carlisle school had a Native American coaching staff:

"For the first time in its history, this season the Carlisle Indian football team will have full-blooded Indians as head coach and assistant coaches, with full authority to plan their own campaigns against the products of the white men's universities in the persons of Edward Rodgers, head coach, Frank Hudson and Bemus Pierce, assistants. Never before have the redskins been trusted to do the brainwork incident to the planning for a football season ... Assistant Coach Bemus Pierce is a former Carlisle pupil, and for the past two years has had charge of the Sherman Institute team, of California."

Rodgers, Pierce and Hudson replaced Pop Warner. As an assistant coach at Carlisle, he also played in the 1904 game vs Haskell at Francis Olympic Field in St. Louis, Missouri. Pierce also served as Carlisle's interim head coach in 1906. During the 1904 season, Pierce continued to play professional football. Between games he coached at Carlisle, Pierce played for a semi-professional team in northern New York that made a barnstorming tour.

Pierce also coached football at the Haskell Indian School in 1906 and at Kenyon College from 1908 to 1910. In 1911 he coached football at Lafayette High School in Buffalo, New York.

== Death and honors ==
Pierce died on February 15, 1957, in Loma Linda, California.

Pierce has been inducted into the American Indian Athletic Hall of Fame at Haskell in Kansas.

== Head coaching record ==
=== College football ===
Year	Team	Overall	Conference	Standing	Bowl/playoffs
Buffalo (Independent) (1899)
1899	Buffalo	6–0			
Buffalo:		6–0			
Carlisle Indians (Independent) (1906)
1906	Carlisle	9–3			
Carlisle:		9–3			
Haskell Indians (Independent) (1907)
1907	Haskell	2–6–1			
Haskell:		2–6–1			
Kenyon Lords (Ohio Athletic Conference) (1908–1910)
1908	Kenyon	7–1–1	3–1–1	2nd	
1909	Kenyon	6–4	4–4	T–5th	
1910	Kenyon	1–6–1	1–5	10th	
Kenyon:		14–11–2	8–10–1		
Total:		31–20–3			
