= Jimmy Johnson (quarterback) =

American football player, coach and dentist (1879–1942)

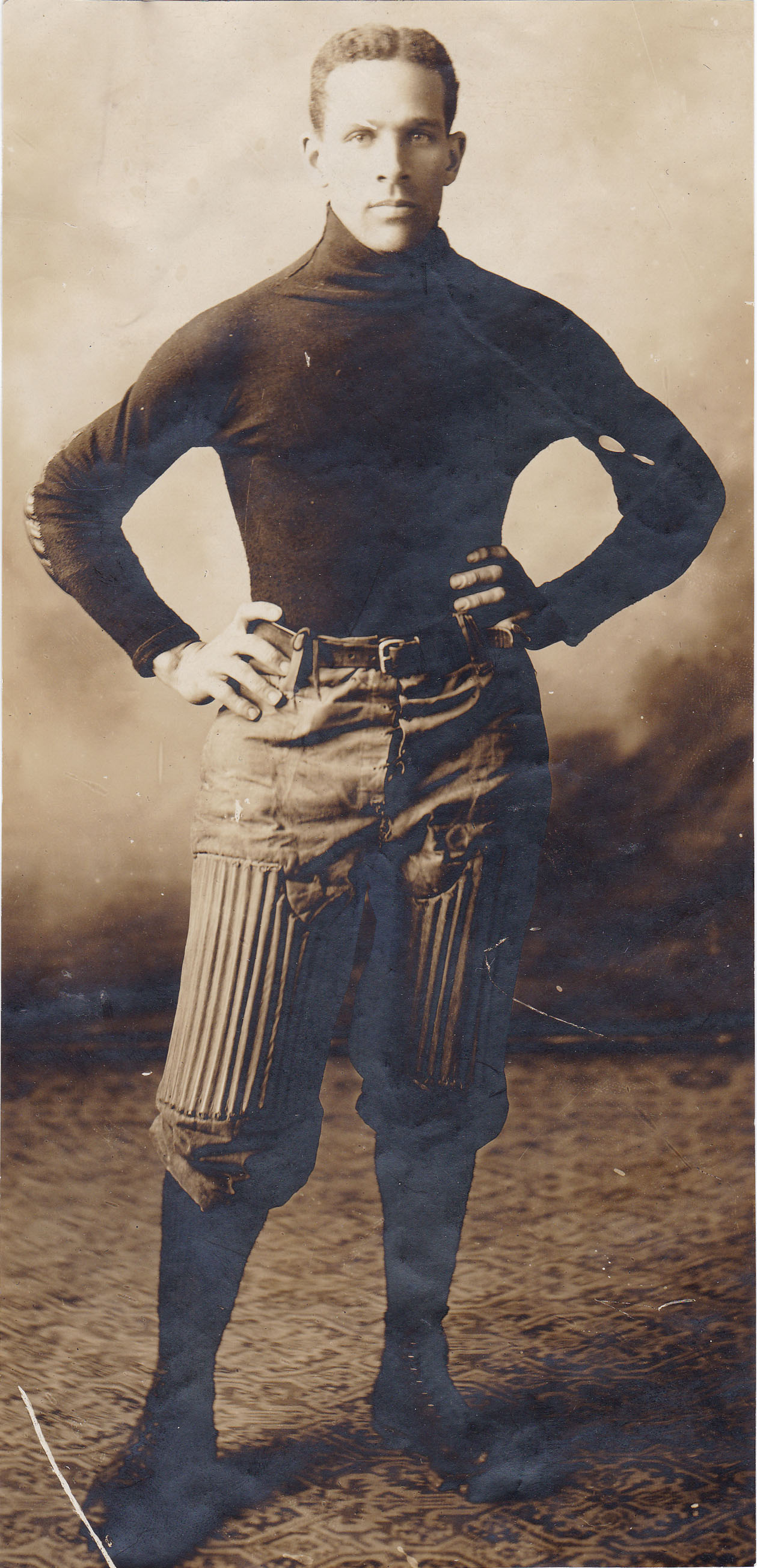

Biographical details
- Born: June 6, 1879; Edgerton, Wisconsin, U.S.
- Died: January 19, 1942 (aged 62); Rochester, Minnesota, U.S.

Playing career
- 1899–1903: Carlisle
- 1904–1905: Northwestern
- Position: Quarterback

Coaching career (HC unless noted)
- 1906: Carlisle (assistant)

Accomplishments and honors

Awards
- Consensus All-American (1903); Third-team All-American (1901)
- College Football Hall of Fame; Inducted in 1969 (profile)

James E. Johnson (June 6, 1879 – January 19, 1942) was an American football player. He was elected to the College Football Hall of Fame in 1969.

== Biography ==
Johnson was born on June 6, 1879, in Edgerton, Wisconsin. Johnson, one-half Stockbridge Indian, attended Carlisle Indian Industrial School from 1899 to 1903, where he starred on the Carlisle football team. Coached by Pop Warner, the team was composed entirely of American Indian students and was a true national powerhouse in the early 20th century. In 1903, Walter Camp named Johnson as the All-American quarterback. Johnson also served as Carlisle's team captain in the same season. Following his career at Carlisle, Johnson enrolled in Northwestern's Dental School and played on the football team during the 1904 and 1905 seasons, also becoming a team captain for Northwestern and leading the team to success despite a depleted roster. Following his playing career, Johnson became a dental surgeon in San Juan, Puerto Rico. He died at the Mayo Clinic in Minnesota in 1942.

Johnson was posthumously inducted into the College Football Hall of Fame in 1969.
