= Carlisle Indians football =

Football team of Carlisle Indian Industrial School

- First season: 1893
- Last season: 1917
- Location: Carlisle, Pennsylvania, U.S.
- NCAA division: Division I
- Conference: Independent
- All-time record: 173–92–13 (.646)

The Carlisle Indians football team represented the Carlisle Indian Industrial School in intercollegiate football competition. The program was active from 1893 until 1917, when it was discontinued. During the program's 25 years, the Indians compiled a 167–88–13 record and 0.647 winning percentage, which makes it the most successful defunct major college football program. During the early 20th century, Carlisle was a national football powerhouse, and regularly competed against other major programs such as the Ivy League schools. Several notable players and coaches were associated with the team, including Pop Warner and Jim Thorpe.

== History ==
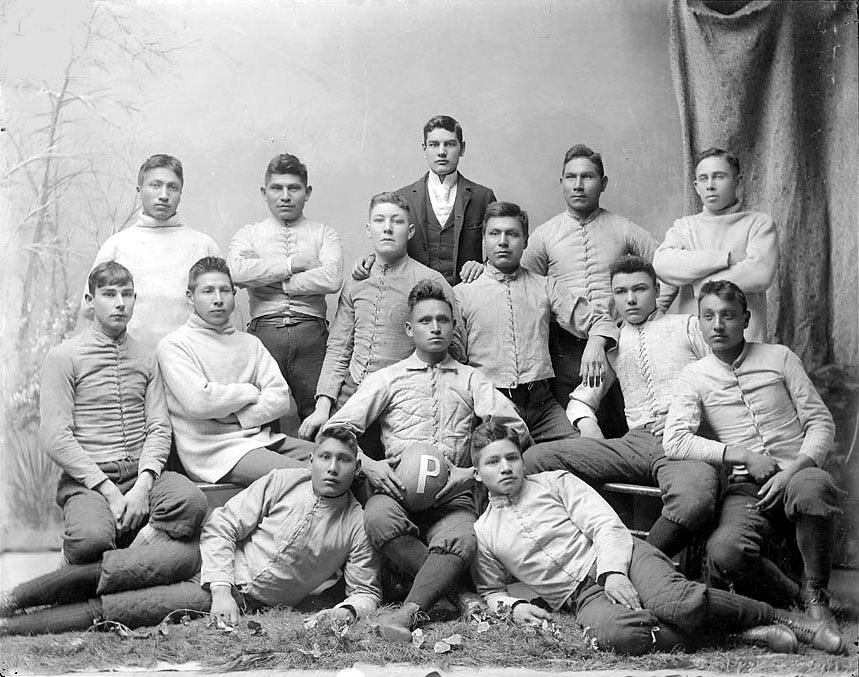
An early football team, called the "Pirates", at the Carlisle Indian Industrial School in 1879

The Carlisle Indian Industrial School was founded in 1879 by an American cavalry officer, Richard Henry Pratt, in Carlisle, Pennsylvania. Its purpose was to facilitate the assimilation of the Native American population into mainstream American society.

In 1893, the Indians played their first season recognized by the National Collegiate Athletic Association. The Indians were consistently outsized by the teams they scheduled, and they in turn relied on speed and guile to remain competitive. Carlisle's playbook gave rise to many trick plays and other innovations that are now commonplace in American football. The overhand spiral throw and hand-off fake are both credited to Carlisle. Other trick plays innovated by the Carlisle Indians cannot be used because the NCAA instituted rules specifically prohibiting them after Carlisle used them.

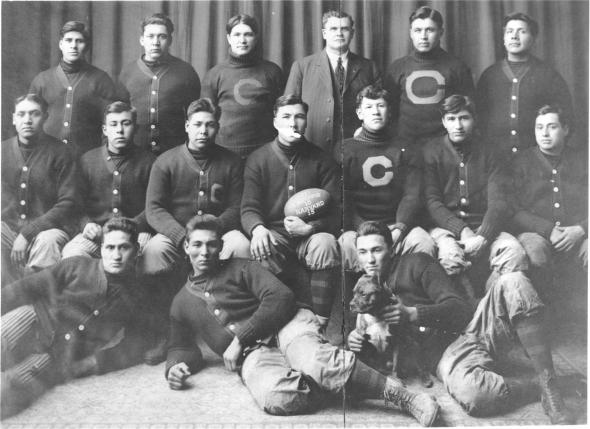
The 1911 Carlisle Indians football team pose with a game ball from the upset of Harvard. Coach "Pop" Warner (standing, third from right) and Jim Thorpe (seated, third from right) are pictured

In 1903, an Indian team coached by Pop Warner first employed its infamous "hidden-ball play" against heavily favored Harvard. Warner, as coach at Cornell, had already used it against Penn State in 1897, but it had not achieved much notice. Carlisle led Harvard at halftime, and hoping to keep the game's momentum, Warner elected to try the play on the ensuing kickoff. Harvard executed the kick, and the Indians formed a circle around the returner. With the aid of a specially altered jersey, the ball was placed up the back of the returner. The Indians broke the huddle and spread out in different directions. Each player feigned carrying the ball, except Dillon, the man with the ball up the back of his jersey. The ruse confused the Crimson players, and they scrambled to find the ball carrier. Dillon, with both his hands free, was ignored by the searching Harvard players, and he ran untouched into the end zone. With the score, Carlisle extended its lead to 11–0, but Harvard came back and eventually won 12–11. Nevertheless, the close match, and trick play, resulted in national attention. Warner had learned the trick from John Heisman while facing Auburn in 1895 during his tenure as coach of the Georgia Bulldogs. After the 1903 season, coach "Pop" Warner resigned from his position as head coach due to issues with a player and with Henry Pratt, who also resigned later that year. But right before the 1907 season,"Pop" Warner returned to the Carlisle Indians football team as the coach and with no Henry Pratt around, he was very much free to run the team all by himself with no supervision and it was during these years in the post- Pratt era that Carlisle Indians football team was able to defeat the biggest football teams in the country. In 1907, Jim Thorpe, undersized even for the Indians, persuaded Warner to allow him to try out for the team. Thorpe immediately impressed his coach and secured a starting position on the team. On October 26, 1907, Jim Thorpe and Carlisle trounced a powerful University of Pennsylvania team, 26–6, before an overflow crowd of 20,000 at Franklin Field. After graduating from Carlisle, he went on to stardom in numerous athletic endeavors, including as an Olympic athlete and professional player in football, baseball, and basketball.

In 1911, the Indians posted an 11–1 record, which included one of the greatest upsets in college football history. Against Harvard, Thorpe scored all of the Indians' points in a shocking upset over the period powerhouse, 18–15. The only loss for Carlisle came at the hands of Syracuse the following week, 12–11.

On November 9, 1912, Carlisle was to meet the U.S. Military Academy in a game at West Point, New York, between two of the top teams in the country. Pop Warner spoke to his team: "Your fathers and your grandfathers," Warner began, "are the ones who fought their fathers. These men playing against you today are soldiers. They are the Long Knives. You are Indians. Tonight, we will know if you are warriors." That dramatic evening Carlisle routed Army 27–6. That game, played just 22 years after the last Army battle with the Lakota/Sioux at the Wounded Knee, featured not only Jim Thorpe, but nine future generals including a linebacker named Dwight D. Eisenhower. "It was an exquisitely apt piece of national theater: a contest between Indians and soldiers."

The Indians' last season of play was 1917. The school folded at the end of the 1917–18 school year. Many of the Indians' players eventually ended up in the National Football League and at other professional football teams during the 1920s.

== Captains ==
Year	Captain
1893	
1894	Benjamin Caswell
1895	Bemus Pierce
1896	Bemus Pierce
1897	Bemus Pierce
1898	Frank Hudson
1899	Martin Wheelock
1900	Edward Rogers
1901	Martin Wheelock
1902	Charles Williams
1903	Jimmy Johnson
1904	Arthur Sheldon
1905	Nicholas Bowen
1906	Albert Exendine
1907	Antonio Lubo
1908	Emil Hauser (aka Waseuka)
1909	Joe Libby
1910	Pete Hauser
1911	Sampson Bird
1912	Jim Thorpe
1913	Gus Welch
1914	Elmer Busch (early season), Pete Calac (later)
1915	Pete Calac
1916	George May
1917	George Tibbetts

== All-time team ==
Coach Warner was once asked by a reporter of the Carlisle Herald to name an all-time team. It includes:
Line

- Albert Exendine, end
- Martin Wheelock, tackle
- Bemus Pierce, guard
- William Garlowe, center
- Charles Dillon, guard
- Emil Hauser, tackle
- Edward Rogers, end

Backfield

- Jimmy Johnson, quarterback
- Jim Thorpe, halfback
- Joe Guyon, halfback
- Pete Hauser, fullback

== Bibliography ==
- Anderson, Lars (2008) [2007]. Carlisle vs. Army: Jim Thorpe, Dwight Eisenhower, Pop Warner, and the Forgotten Story of Football's Greatest Battle (Paperback ed.). New York: Random House. p. 349. ISBN 978-0-8129-7731-8.
- Jenkins, Sally (2007). The Real All Americans: The Team That Changed a Game, a People, a Nation (First ed.). New York: Random House. pp. 343. ISBN 978-0-385-51987-8.
