= Eddie Rogers =

American football player and coach (1876–1971)

Biographical details
- Born: April 14, 1876; Libby, Minnesota, U.S.
- Died: October 17, 1971 (aged 95); Wayzata, Minnesota, U.S.

Playing career
- 1897–1900: Carlisle
- 1898: Dickinson
- 1901–1903: Minnesota
- 1904: Carlisle
- Position: End

Coaching career (HC unless noted)
- 1904: Carlisle
- 1905–1908: St. Thomas (MN)

Head coaching record
- Overall: 24–11–1

Accomplishments and honors

Awards
- Third-team All-American (1903)
- College Football Hall of Fame; Inducted in 1968 (profile)

Edward Lowell Rogers (April 14, 1876 – October 17, 1971) was an American college football player and coach. He played at the end at three different schools between 1897 and 1904: the Carlisle Indian Industrial School, Dickinson College, and the University of Minnesota. Rogers served as the head football coach at Carlisle in 1904 and the College of St. Thomas—now known as the University of St. Thomas—in Saint Paul, Minnesota from 1905 to 1908. He was inducted into the College Football Hall of Fame as player in 1968. Rogers was also elected to the American Indian Athletic Hall of Fame in 1973.

== Early life ==
Rogers was born in the forests of Minnesota to a pioneer lumberman, and Chippewa mother.

== Career ==
=== Football ===
Rogers attended school at both Carlisle Institute and the University of Minnesota. Rogers career spanned seven seasons, four as a member of the Redmen teams, which lifted Carlisle to national prominence, and three campaigns at Minnesota. After the close of Carlisle's 1898 season, Rogers and Frank Cayou played for Dickinson College, where they were enrolled in law school, in their Thanksgiving Day loss versus Penn State. Rogers served as team captain at Carlisle in 1900 and Minnesota in 1903. The 1903 Minnesota team had an 11–0–1 record. He was named a third-team All-American by Walter Camp in 1903. As coach at Carlisle, he also played in the game vs Haskell at Francis Olympic Field in St. Louis, Missouri. While at Minnesota Rogers was a member of professional law fraternity Phi Delta Phi.

=== Coaching ===
In 1904 Rogers was head coach at Carlisle, and had a 9–2 record. He was the head coach at St. Thomas from 1905 to 1908, compiling a record of 14–9–1.

=== Law ===
The following year after coaching Carlisle, he returned to Minneapolis and began practicing law. He practiced law for 62 years, from 1905 to 1966, retiring at the age of 90.

== Death ==
Rogers died on October 17, 1971, at Hillcrest Nursing Home in Wayzata, Minnesota.

== Head coaching record ==
Year	Team	Overall	Conference	Standing	Bowl/playoffs
Carlisle Indians (Independent) (1904)
1904	Carlisle	10–2			
Carlisle:		10–2			
St. Thomas Cadets (Independent) (1905–1908)
1905	St. Thomas	3–2			
1906	St. Thomas	2–1–1			
1907	St. Thomas	7–0			
1908	St. Thomas	2–6			
St. Thomas:		14–9–1			
Total:		24–11–1			
