= Albert Exendine =

American football player, coach, and lawyer (1884–1973)

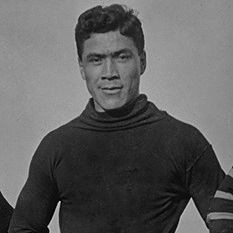

Biographical details
- Born: January 7, 1884; Bartlesville, Oklahoma, U.S.
- Died: January 4, 1973 (aged 88); Tulsa, Oklahoma, U.S.

Playing career

Football
- 1902–1907: Carlisle
- Position: End

Coaching career (HC unless noted)

Football
- 1909–1911: Otterbein
- 1914–1922: Georgetown
- 1923–1925: Washington State
- 1926–1927: Occidental
- 1928: Northeastern State
- 1929–1933: Oklahoma A&M (assistant)
- 1934–1935: Oklahoma A&M

Baseball
- 1932–1933: Oklahoma A&M

Head coaching record
- Overall: 94–63–15 (football); 19–13 (baseball)

Accomplishments and honors

Championships
- 3 SAIAA (1915, 1917, 1919)

Awards
- Consensus All-American (1907); Third-team All-American (1906)
- College Football Hall of Fame; Inducted in 1970 (profile)

Albert Andrew "Ex" Exendine (January 7, 1884 – January 4, 1973) was an American football player, coach, and lawyer. He played college football at the Carlisle Indian Industrial School where he was an All-American end. Exendine served as the head football coach at Otterbein College (1909–1911), Georgetown University (1914–1922), the State College of Washington—now known as Washington State University (1923–1925), Occidental College (1926–1927), Northeastern State Teachers' College—now known as Northeastern State University (1928), and Oklahoma Agricultural and Mechanical College—now known as Oklahoma State University (1934–1935). He was also the head baseball coach at Oklahoma A&M from 1932 to 1933, tallying a mark of 19–13. Exendine was inducted into the College Football Hall of Fame as a player in 1970.

Exendine was born in Indian Territory and played for Pop Warner's Carlisle Indians from 1902 to 1907. Though never having played the game before arriving at the institute, Exendine was named to Walter Camp's third-team All-American team in 1906. Vanderbilt upset Carlisle 4–0 in 1906. Vanderbilt running back Honus Craig called this his hardest game, giving special praise to Exendine as "the fastest end I ever saw."

From 1914 to 1922, Exendine coached at Georgetown and compiled a 55–21–3 record. His tenure there included a 9–1 season in 1916 and an 8–1 season in 1921. From 1923 to 1925, he coached at Washington State, tallying a mark of 6–13–4. From 1934 to 1935, he coached at Oklahoma A&M, where he compiled a 7–12–1 record.

Exendine earned a law degree at Dickinson School of Law while he was coaching at Georgetown. He later practiced law in Oklahoma and served with the Bureau of Indian Affairs. Exendine died on January 4, 1973, at a hospital in Tulsa, Oklahoma.

== Head coaching record ==
=== Football ===
Year	Team	Overall	Conference	Standing	Bowl/playoffs
Otterbein Cardinals () (1909–1911)
1909	Otterbein	4–3–1			
1910	Otterbein	5–1–1			
1911	Otterbein	6–3–1			
Otterbein:		15–7–3			
Georgetown Blue and Gray (South Atlantic Intercollegiate Athletic Association) (1914–1921)
1914	Georgetown	2–4–2	0–1–1	5th	
1915	Georgetown	7–2	2–0	T–1st	
1916	Georgetown	9–1	2–0	2nd	
1917	Georgetown	7–1	2–0	1st	
1918	Georgetown	3–2	0–0	NA	
1919	Georgetown	7–3	2–0	1st	
1920	Georgetown	6–4	3–1	T–4th	
1921	Georgetown	8–1	1–0	T–2nd	
Georgetown Blue and Gray (Independent) (1922)
1922	Georgetown	6–3–1			
Georgetown:		55–21–3	12–2–1		
Washington State Cougars (Northwest Conference / Pacific Coast Conference) (1923–1925)
1923	Washington State	2–4–1	2–2–1 / 1–3–1	T–3rd / T–6th	
1924	Washington State	1–5–2	1–4–2 / 0–4–1	8th / T–8th	
1925	Washington State	3–4–1	1–3–1 / 2–3	T–6th / T–6th	
Washington State:		6–13–4	5–11–4		
Occidental Tigers (Southern California Conference) (1926–1927)
1926	Occidental	4–4–1	3–2	T–4th	
1927	Occidental	3–5–1	2–3	T–5th	
Occidental:		7–9–2	5–5		
Northeastern State Redmen (Oklahoma Collegiate Athletic Conference) (1928)
1929	Northeastern State	4–1–2	2–1–2	4th	
Northeastern State:		4–1–2	2–1–2		
Oklahoma A&M Cowboys (Missouri Valley Conference) (1934–1935)
1934	Oklahoma A&M	4–5–1	1–1	T–3rd	
1935	Oklahoma A&M	3–7	0–3	7th	
Oklahoma A&M:		7–12–1	1–4		
Total:		94–63–15			
National championship Conference title Conference division title or championship game berth

=== Baseball ===
Record table
Season	Team	Overall	Conference	Standing	Postseason
Oklahoma A&M Cowboys (Missouri Valley Conference) (1932–1933)
1932	Oklahoma A&M	6–10			
1933	Oklahoma A&M	13–3			
Oklahoma A&M:		19–13 (.594)			
Total:		19–13 (.594)			
National champion Postseason invitational champion Conference regular season champion Conference regular season and conference tournament champion Division regular season champion Division regular season and conference tournament champion Conference tournament champion
