= 1912 All-Eastern football team =

American all-star college football team

The 1912 All-Eastern football team consists of American football players chosen by various selectors as the best players at each position among the Eastern colleges and universities during the 1912 college football season.

== All-Eastern selections ==
=== Quarterbacks ===
- Everett Bacon, Wesleyan (NYS-1)
- Vince Pazzetti, Lehigh (NYS-2; PP-1)
- Henry Burchell Gardner, Harvard (PP-2)

=== Halfbacks ===
- Charles Brickley, Harvard (NYS-1; PP-1)
- Huntington Hardwick, Harvard (NYS-1; PP-2)
- Leroy Mercer, Penn (NYS-2)
- Hobey Baker, Princeton (NYS-2; PP-1)
- Percy Wendell, Harvard (PP-2)

=== Fullbacks ===
- Jim Thorpe, Carlisle (NYS-1; PP-1)
- Pete Mauthe, Penn State (NYS-2)
- Wallace De Witt, Princeton (PP-2)

=== Ends ===
- Douglas Bomeisler, Yale (NYS-1; PP-1)
- Dexter Very, Penn State (NYS-1; PP-2)
- K. P. Gilchrist, Navy (NYS-2; PP-2)
- Sam Felton, Harvard (NYS-2; PP-1)

=== Tackles ===
- Robert Treat Paine Storer, Harvard (NYS-1; PP-1)
- Wesley Englehorn, Dartmouth (NYS-1; PP-2)
- Leland Devore, Army (PP-1)
- Joe Guyon, Carlisle (NYS-2)
- Rudy Probst, Syracuse (NYS-2)
- Phillips, Princeton (PP-2)

=== Guards ===
- John Brown, Navy (NYS-1; PP-2)
- Schenck, Princeton (NYS-1; PP-1)
- Talbot Pendleton, Yale (PP-1)
- John Munns, Cornell (NYS-2)
- Hamner Huston, Army (NYS-2)
- Stan Pennock, Harvard (PP-2)

=== Centers ===
- Hank Ketcham, Yale (NYS-1; PP-1)
- Derrick Parmenter, Harvard (NYS-2)
- Arthur Bluethenthal, Princeton (PP-2)

== Key ==
- NYS = New York Sun
- PP = The Paterson Press

== See also ==
- 1912 College Football All-America Team
