= Henry Ketcham =

Henry Ketcham may refer to:

- Hank Ketcham (1920–2001), American cartoonist
- Hank Ketcham (American football) (1891–1986), American college football player
- Henry H. Ketcham (born 1949), Canadian businessman

== See also ==
- Ketcham (surname)
- Henry Ketchum (1839–1896), Canadian railway engineer and businessman
