= Ketchum =

Ketchum may refer to:

== Places ==
=== United States ===
- Ketchum, Idaho, a city
- Ketchum, Oklahoma, a town
- Lake Ketchum, Washington, a census-designated place

=== Antarctica ===
- Ketchum Glacier
- Ketchum Ridge

== Other uses ==
- Ketchum (surname), a surname
- Ketchum Inc., a large public relations agency within Omnicom Group
- Ketchum Graham, Canadian politician
- Ketchum Award, presented by Woods Hole Oceanographic Institution

== See also ==
- Ketcham
