= Ketcham =

Ketcham is a surname. Notable people with the name include:

== Politicians ==
- John C. Ketcham (1873–1941), U.S. Representative from Michigan
- John H. Ketcham (1832–1906), U.S. Representative from New York
- William Ketcham (1819–1879), American politician in Wisconsin and lumber executive
- William A. Ketcham (1846–1921), American politician in Indiana and commander of the Grand Army of the Republic
- Winthrop Welles Ketcham (1820–1879), U.S. Representative from Pennsylvania

== Other ==
- Albert H. Ketcham (1870–1935), American orthodontist
- Dennis Ketcham (born 1946), son of Hank Ketcham and inspiration for Dennis the Menace
- Emily Burton Ketcham (1838–1907), American suffragist
- Hank Ketcham (1920–2001), creator of the American cartoon strip Dennis the Menace
- Hank Ketcham (American football) (1891–1986), American gridiron football player
- Henry H. Ketcham (born 1949), Canadian lumber executive, grandson of Hank Ketcham (American football)
- Jennifer Ketcham (born 1983), American former pornographic actress known under the pseudonym "Penny Flame"
- John Ketcham (Indiana surveyor) (1782–1865), American surveyor, building contractor and judge
- John Ketcham (producer-director), American producer
- Ralph Ketcham (1927–2017), American academic
- Robert T. Ketcham, (1889–1978), Baptist pastor and a founder of the General Association of Regular Baptist Churches
- Susan Merrill Ketcham (1841–1930), American painter
- Treddy Ketcham (1919–2006), United States Marine Corps officer
- William H. Ketcham (1868–1921), American Catholic missionary

== See also ==
- Ketchum (disambiguation)
- Roy C. Ketcham High School, a public school in Wappingers Falls, New York, U.S.
