= 1912 All-America college football team =

Official list of the best college football players of 1912

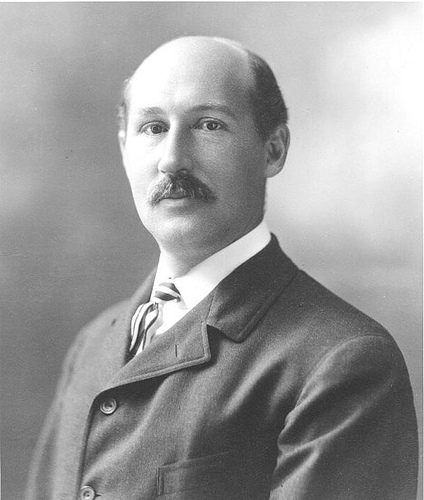
Walter Camp, the only "official" All-America selector in 1912

The 1912 All-America college football team is composed of college football players who were selected as All-Americans for the 1912 college football season. The only selector for the 1912 season who has been recognized as "official" by the National Collegiate Athletic Association (NCAA) is Walter Camp. Many other sports writers, newspapers, coaches and others also selected All-America teams in 1912. One writer, Louis A. Dougher, published a "Composite Eleven" in the Washington Times which consisted of his aggregating the first-team picks of 23 selectors.

The Harvard Crimson football team of 1912 finished the season with a perfect 10-0 record and outscored opponents 176 to 22. A total of 10 Harvard players were named first-team All-Americans by at least one selector. They are Charles Brickley, Gerard Driscoll, Sam Felton, Henry Burchell Gardner, Harvey Hitchcock, Huntington Hardwick, Francis Joseph O'Brien, Stan Pennock, Bob Storer, and Percy Wendell.

Only two players from schools outside of the Ivy League were selected as consensus first-team All-Americans. They are Bob Butler from Wisconsin and Jim Thorpe from Carlisle.

== Walter Camp's "official" selections ==
The only individual who has been recognized as an "official" selector by the National Collegiate Athletic Association (NCAA) for the 1912 season is Walter Camp. Accordingly, the NCAA's official listing of "Consensus All-America Selections" mirrors Camp's first-team picks. Nine of Camp's first-team All-Americans in 1912 played on teams from the Ivy League. The only two players recognized by Camp from outside the Ivy League were Jim Thorpe from the Carlisle School and Bob Butler of Wisconsin.

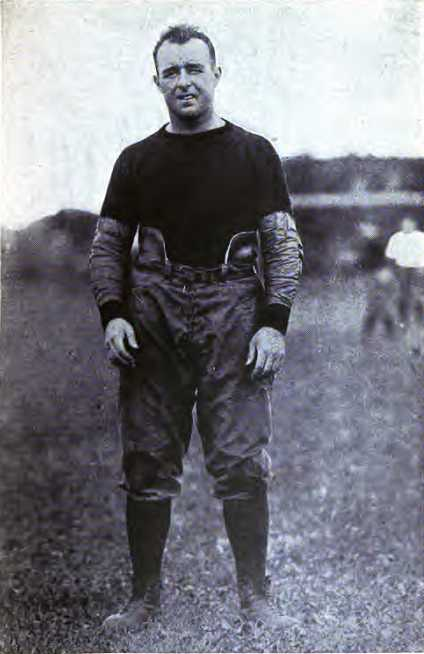
Charles Brickley of Harvard.

The dominance of Ivy League players on Camp's All-America teams led to criticism over the years that his selections were biased against players from the leading Western universities, including Chicago, Michigan, Minnesota, Wisconsin, and Notre Dame. Camp's first-team All-Americans in 1912 included:

- Douglas Bomeisler, end from Yale, inducted into the College Football Hall of Fame in 1972.
- Charles Brickley, halfback for Harvard, led Harvard to a perfect 9–0 record in 1912. and later served as the head football coach at Johns Hopkins, Boston College, and Fordham.
- Bob Butler, tackle from Wisconsin, inducted into the College Football Hall of Fame in 1972. Camp said of Butler, "He was powerful, active, and excellent at sizing up plays, good at blocking his man, and dangerous in his breaking through."
- George Crowther, quarterback at Brown, nicknamed "Kid" because he weighed between 130 and 135 pounds while playing at Brown.
- Wesley Englehorn, tackle for Dartmouth, later served as head coach at Washington State.
- Sam Felton, end for Harvard, was considered one of the best punters in the country.
- Hank Ketcham, center for Yale, inducted into the College Football Hall of Fame in 1968.
- Leroy Mercer, fullback for Penn, inducted into the College Football Hall of Fame in 1955.
- Stan Pennock, guard from Harvard, inducted into the College Football Hall of Fame in 1954.
- Jim Thorpe, halfback for Carlisle, inducted into both the College and Pro Football Hall of Fame. He won gold medals in the pentathlon and decathlon at the 1912 Summer Olympics, but had the medals taken back for violations of amateurism rules.

== Other selectors ==
By 1912, there was a proliferation of newspapers, sports writers, coaches and others choosing All-America teams. Recognizing the difficulties faced by any single person who could only watch one game per week, some began to seek better methodologies for selecting a true "consensus" All-America team. One writer, Louis A. Dougher of the Washington Times published a "Consensus Team" which he arrived at by aggregating the picks made by 23 newspapers, writers, coaches and football experts. The 23 All-America teams aggregated by Dougher included those picked by Walter Camp, football historian Parke H. Davis, Dartmouth coach Frank Cavanaugh, former Harvard star Hamilton Fish III, Fordham coach Tom Thorp, former Chicago star Tiny Maxwell, the New York American, The New York Globe, the New York World, The Evening World, the New York Tribune, the New York Press, The Sun (New York), The Philadelphia Inquirer, the Public Ledger (Philadelphia), The Philadelphia Press, the Philadelphia Evening Telegraph, The Baltimore Sun, the Baltimore News, the Pittsburgh Dispatch; the Pennsylvanian, and Dougher's own selections.

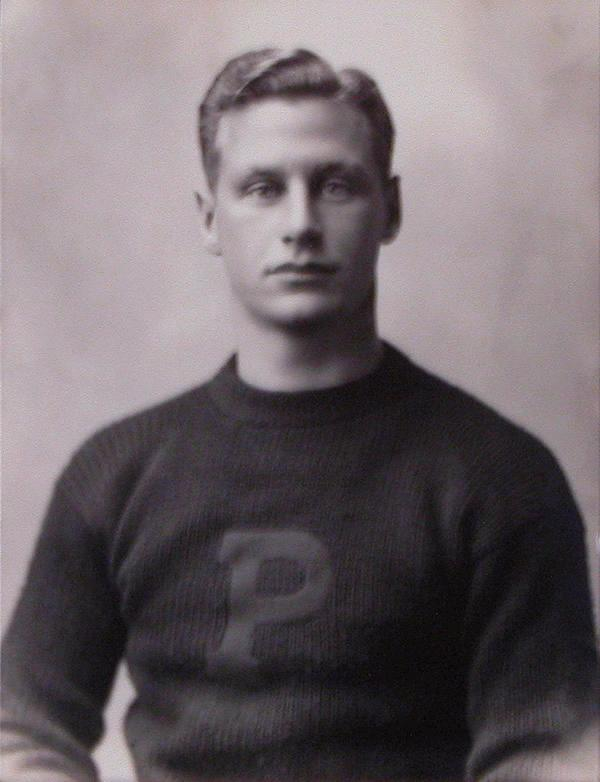
Hobey Baker of Princeton

Dougher's efforts revealed that a number of Camp's picks were not truly "consensus" picks. For example, five of the eleven players identified by Dougher as consensus picks were overlooked by Camp. They are:

- Robert Treat Paine Storer. Storer was a tackle at Harvard. He was selected as a first-team All-American by 21 of the 23 selectors polled by Dougher. Yet, Camp did not name Storer to his first, second or even third team.
- Rip Shenk. Shenk was a guard for Princeton. He was selected as a first-team player by 14 of Dougher's selectors. Yet, Camp did not name him to his first, second or third teams.
- John Brown. Brown was a tackle for Navy. He was inducted into the College Football Hall of Fame in 1951. He was selected as a first-team All-American by 13 of Dougher's selectors. He was selected by Camp for his third team.
- Hobey Baker. Baker was a halfback at Princeton. He has been inducted into Halls of Fame in two sports—the College Football Hall of Fame (in 1975) and the Hockey Hall of Fame (in 1945). Baker was selected as a composite All-American with votes from nine of Dougher's selectors. Camp placed Baker on his third team. F. Scott Fitzgerald was a fellow Princeton student who idolized Baker and included several references to him in his first novel, This Side of Paradise.
- Pat Pazetti. Pazetti of Lehigh was the consensus pick on Dougher's list with seven votes. Pazetti was chosen by Camp for his second team.

Dougher sought to explain the lack of representation of players from the West as follows: "The complete absence of any western players from all the selections except Camp's is easily explained in that western writers call their teams all-western instead of all-America as do the writers of the eastern sheets."

== All-Americans of 1912 ==
=== Ends ===
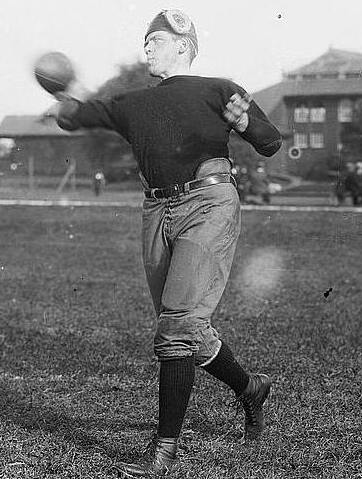
Sam Felton of Harvard

- **Douglas Bomeisler**, Yale (College Football Hall of Fame) (WC–1; COMP-1 (20); NYS-1; PI-1; CSM-1; BS; RE-1; WJM-1; TC-1; PHD-1; PW-1; TET-1; HF-1; PP-1; MDJ-2)
- **Sam Felton**, Harvard (WC–1; COMP-1 (13); NYS-2; PI-2; CSM-1; RE-1; WJM-1; ASH-1; PHD-1; TET-1; HF-1; PP-2; MDJ-1)
- Dexter Very, Penn. State (College Football Hall of Fame) (WC-2; COMP-2 (9); NYS-1; PW-1; PP-1; MDJ-2)
- K. P. Gilchrist, Navy (NYS-2; COMP-2 (3); PI-1; BS; HF-2; PP-3)
- Miller Pontius, Michigan (ASH-1)
- Busty Ashbaugh, Brown (WC-3; TC-1; HF-2)
- Francis Joseph O'Brien, Harvard (MDJ-1)
- Joseph Hoeffel, Wisconsin (WC-2)
- Al Jordan, Bucknell (WC-3)
- John O'Hearn, Cornell (PI-2)
- Lon Jourdet, Penn (PP-2)
- Harold R. Eyrick, Cornell (PP-3)

=== Tackles ===
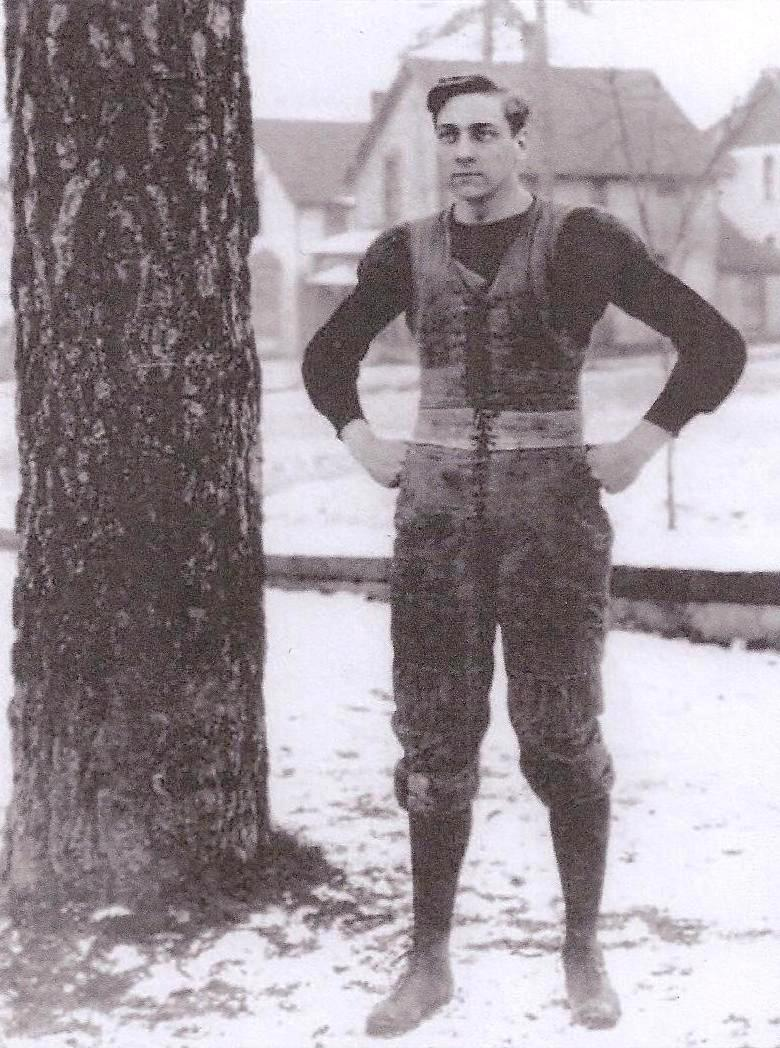
Wesley Englehorn of Dartmouth

- **Wesley Englehorn**, Dartmouth (WC–1; COMP-1 (15); NYS-1; PI-2; RE-1; TC-1; PHD-1; PW-1; HF-2 [g]; PP-1; MDJ-1)
- **Bob Butler**, Wisconsin (College Football Hall of Fame) (WC–1; ASH-1; HF-2)
- Bob Storer, Harvard (NYS-1; COMP-1 (21); PI-1; BS; RE–1; WJM-1; TC-1; PW-1; TET-1; HF-1; PP-1; MDJ-2)
- Leland Devore, Army (WC-3; COMP-2 (4); BS; CSM-1; HF-1; PP-3; MDJ-2 [g])
- Joe Guyon, Carlisle (College Football Hall of Fame) (COMP-2 (3); NYS-2; WJM–1; MDJ-2)
- Phillips, Princeton (PHD–1; TET-1; PP-2)
- Harvey Hitchock, Harvard (PI-2; CSM-1; HF-2; MDJ-1)
- Wilder Penfield, Princeton (PI-1)
- Jim Trickey, Iowa (WC-2; ASH-1)
- Rudy Probst, Syracuse (WC-2; NYS-2)
- Wagonhurst, Lafayette (PP-2)
- Clark Shaughnessy, Minnesota (College Football Hall of Fame) (WC-3)
- Al Wilson, Penn State (PP-3)

=== Guards ===
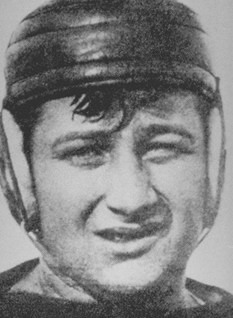
Stan Pennock of Harvard

- **Stan Pennock**, Harvard (College Football Hall of Fame) (WC–1; COMP-2 (6); PI-1; CSM-1; RE-1; ASH-1; TC-1; PHD-1; PW-1; TET-1)
- **John Logan**, Princeton (WC–1; ASH-1)
- John Brown, Navy (College Football Hall of Fame) (WC-3; COMP-1 (13); NYS-1; PI-2; CSM-1; BS; PHD-1; PW-1; HF-1; PP-1)
- Rip Shenk, Princeton (COMP-1 (14); NYS-1; PI-2; RE–1; TET-1; PP-1; MDJ-2)
- Ray L. Bennett, Dartmouth (WC-3; COMP-2 (5); BS; HF-1; PP-2; MDJ-1)
- Carroll T. Cooney, Yale (WC-2; WJM-1)
- Talbot Pendleton, Yale (PI-1; PP-2)
- George T. Howe, Navy (TC–1)
- Gerard Timothy Driscoll, Harvard (MDJ-1)
- D. H. Kulp, Brown (WC-2)
- John James Munns, Cornell (NYS-2)
- Hamner Huston, Army (NYS-2)
- Britain Patterson, William & Jefferson (PP-3)
- James "Red" Bebout, Penn State (PP-3)

=== Centers ===
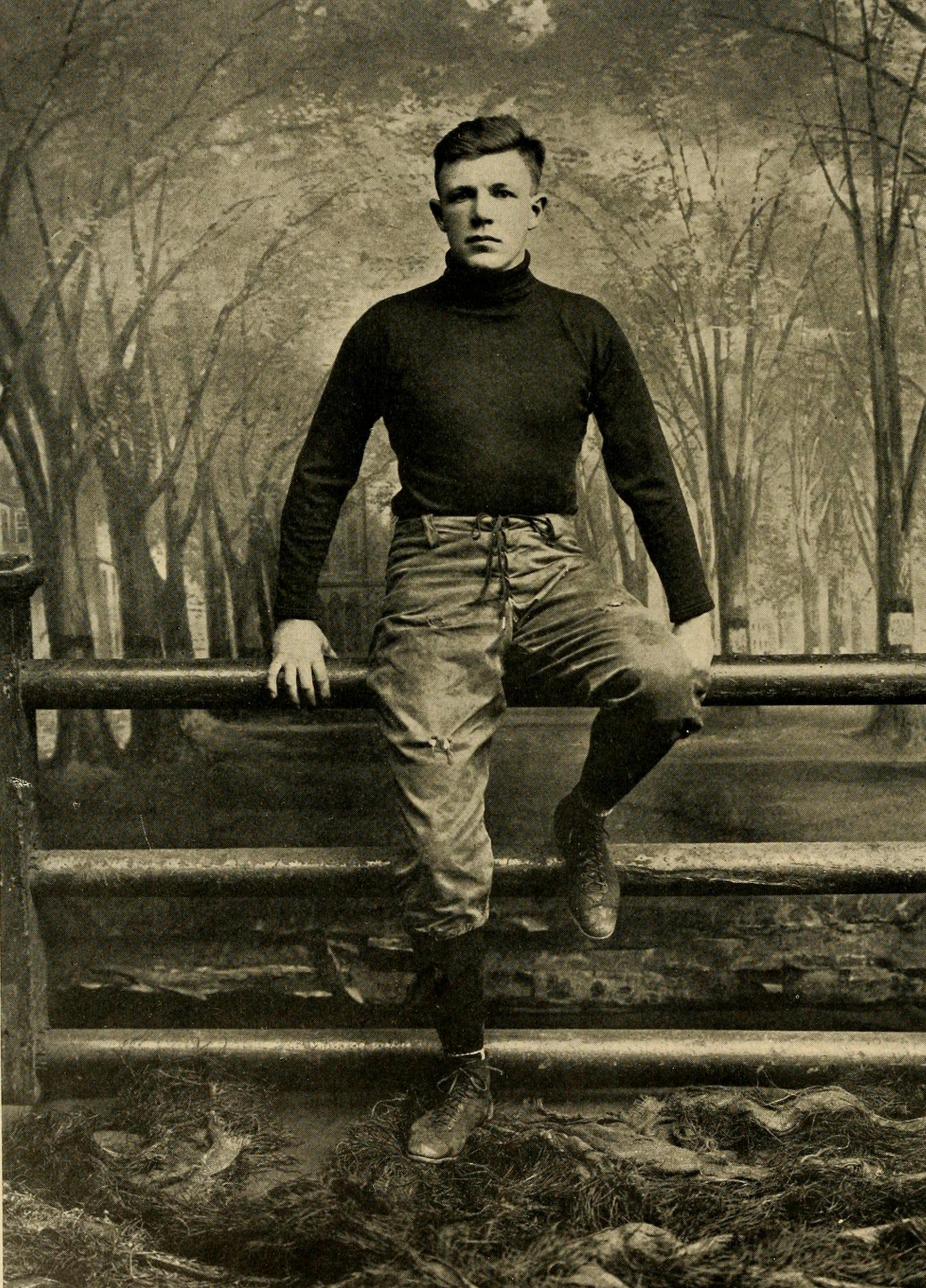
Hank Ketcham of Yale

- **Hank Ketcham**, Yale (College Football Hall of Fame (WC–1; COMP-1 (22); NYS-1; PI-1; CSM-1; BS; RE-1; WJM-1; ASH-1; TC-1; PW-1; TET-1; HF-1; PP-1; MDJ-1)
- Arthur Bluethenthal, Princeton (WC-3; COMP-2 (1); PI-2; HF-2 [g]; PP-3; MDJ-2)
- Howard L. Benson, Lafayette (PHD–1)
- Derric Choate Parmenter, Harvard (WC-2; NYS-2; HF-2)
- Simpson, Penn State (PP-2)

=== Quarterbacks ===
- **George Crowther**, Brown (WC–1; WJM-1)
- Pat Pazetti, Lehigh (WC-2; COMP-1 (7); NYS-2; PI-2; BS; PHD-1; PW-1; HF-2; PP-1; MDJ-2)
- Everett Bacon, Wesleyan (College Football Hall of Fame) (WC-3; COMP-2 (5); NYS-1; RE-1)
- Eddie Gillette, Wisconsin (CSM-1; ASH-1; TC-1)
- Henry Burchell Gardner, Harvard (PI-1; TET-1; PP-3)
- Harry Costello, Georgetown (MDJ-1)
- Shorty Miller, Penn State (College Football Hall of Fame) (COMP-2 (5); PP-2)

=== Halfbacks ===
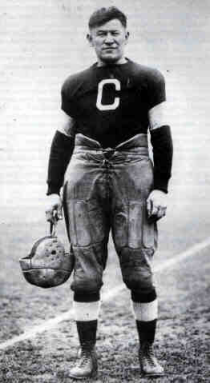
Jim Thorpe of Carlisle

- **Charles E. Brickley**, Harvard (WC–1; COMP-1 (23); NYS-1; PI-1; CSM-1; BS; RE-1; WJM-1; ASH-1; TC-1; PHD-1; PW-1; TET-1 [fb]; HF-1; PP-1; MDJ-1)
- **Jim Thorpe**, Carlisle (College Football Hall of Fame) (WC–1; COMP-1 (23) [f]; NYS-1 [fb]; PI-1; CSM-1; BS [fb]; RE-1; WJM-1; ASH-1; TC-1; PHD-1 [fb]; PW-1; TET-1; HF-1; PP-1 [fb]; MDJ-1 [fb])
- Hobey Baker, Princeton (College Football Hall of Fame) (WC-3; COMP-1 (9); NYS-2; BS; PHD-1; TET-1; HF-1 [qb]; PP-1; MDJ-1)
- Dave Morey, Dartmouth (WC-2; WJM-1 [guard]; MDJ-2)
- Nelson Norgren, Chicago (WC-2)
- Lewie Hardage, Vanderbilt (WC-3)
- Jesse Spalding, Yale (PI-2)
- E. Waller, Princeton (PI-2)
- Alex Arcasa, Carlisle (PP-2)
- L. Fred Gieg, Swarthmore (PP-3)
- S. W. Harrington, Penn (PP-3)
- Ted Hudson, Trinity (MDJ-2)

=== Fullbacks ===
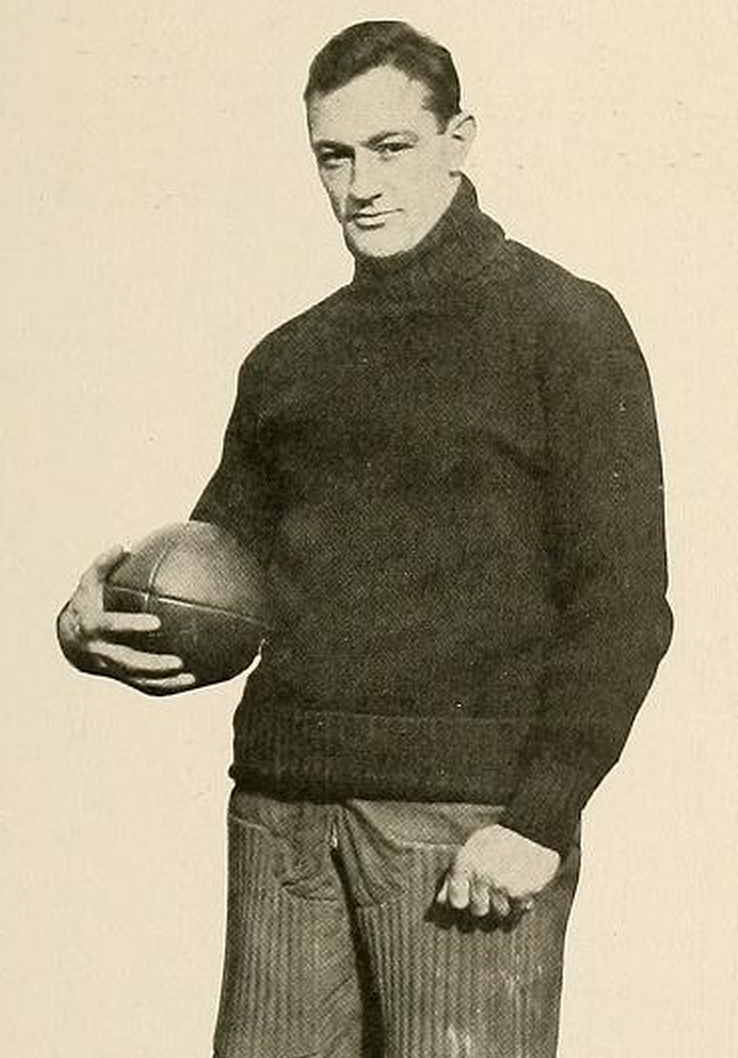
Leroy Mercer of Penn.

- **Leroy Mercer**, Penn (College Football Hall of Fame) (WC–1; NYS-2 [hb]; HF-2 [hb])
- Wallace "Butch" De Witt, Princeton (PI-1; RE–1; PP-2)
- Percy Wendell, Harvard (College Football Hall of Fame) (WC-2; COMP-2 (4); PI-2; CSM-1; WJM-1; HF-1; MDJ-2)
- Huntington Hardwick, Harvard (College Football Hall of Fame) (COMP-2 (2); NYS-1 [hb]; TC-1; HF-2 [hb]; PP-2 [hb])
- Pete Mauthe, Penn State (College Football Hall of Fame) (NYS-2; PW-1; PP-3)
- Spencer Armstrong Pumpelly, Yale (WC-3)
- Ray Eichenlaub, Notre Dame (College Football Hall of Fame) (ASH-1)
- George C. Thomson, Michigan (HF-2)

=== Key ===
NCAA-recognized selectors for 1912

- WC = Collier's Weekly as selected by Walter Camp

Other selectors

- COMP = Composite Eleven selected by Louis A. Dougher in the Washington Times
- PHD = Parke H. Davis, a noted football historian and Princeton's representative on the intercollegiate rules committee
- PW = Glenn S. "Pop" Warner, head football coach at Carlisle
- BS = The Baltimore Sun
- NYS = The New York Sun
- PI = The Philadelphia Inquirer
- PP = The Philadelphia Press
- MDJ = Meriden Daily Journal from New Haven County, Connecticut
- CSM = The Christian Science Monitor
- RE = Robert W. Edgren, a nationally syndicated newspaper reporter who served as the sports editor of The Evening World
- WJM = W.J. MacBeth
- ASH = Alfred S. Harvey of the Milwaukee Free Press
- TC = Tommy Clark
- TET = Trenton Evening Times
- HF = Hamilton Fish III

Bold = Consensus All-American

- 1 – First-team selection
- 2 – Second-team selection
- 3 – Third-team selection

== See also ==
- 1912 All-Southern college football team
- 1912 All-Western college football team
