= George Crowther =

George Crowther may refer to:

- George Calhoun Crowther (1849–1914), U.S. Representative from Missouri
- George Crowther, translated La Dentellière (The Lacemaker), into English in 1976
- George Crowther (American football) (1891–1963), American football player
- George Crowther (footballer) (1891–?), English footballer
- George Henry Crowther (1854–1918) founded Brighton Grammar School in 1882
