= S. W. Harrington =

American physician, surgeon, college football player and coach

Stuart William "Tack" Harrington
- Born: April 20, 1889; Blossburg, Pennsylvania, U.S.
- Died: March 1975 (aged 85); Rochester, Minnesota, U.S.
- Education: University of Pennsylvania (MD), University of Minnesota (MS)
- Occupations: Physician; Football Coach
- Employer(s): Howard Hospital; Dickinson College; Mayo Clinic
- Spouse: Gertrude Harrington

Stuart William "Tack" Harrington (April 20, 1889 – March 1975) was an American physician and surgeon, and college football player and coach.

== Early life ==
Harrington was born in Blossburg, Pennsylvania in 1889. In 1908 he entered Pennsylvania State College as a premedical student. He played one year of varsity football there under Tom Fennell. He then matriculated to the University of Pennsylvania (UPA), where he received the M.D. degree in 1913. While at UPA, he played 3 years of varsity football and was named an All-American halfback in 1912 by The Philadelphia Press.

== Medical career ==
After Medical School, Harrington interned at Howard Hospital in Philadelphia. In November 1914 he became a fellow in surgery at the Mayo Clinic. He earned a Master of Science degree in surgery from the University of Minnesota. In 1920, Harrington became head of a section of surgery at the Mayo Clinic, eventually becoming a full professor.

On the advice of William James Mayo, Harrington changed his subspeciality from gastrointestinal and urologic surgery to thoracic and breast surgery. Eventually Harrington developed an international reputation in the diagnosis and treatment of diaphragmatic hernias and mediastinal tumors. He was honored several times by the American Medical Association for work on chronic postpneumonic empyema, and pericardiectomy for chronic constrictive pericarditis. In 1937, Harrington was elected the 20th president of The American Association for Thoracic Surgery and in 1948 he helped found the American Board of Surgery. Harrington came on the staff at Mayo's in 1917 and retired in 1954. He started the department of Thoracic Surgery after a trip to Germany to study thoracotomy methods. He worked with anesthesiologist John Lundy to develop early methods of intubation and anesthesia for open chest cases. Harrington originated the trans-abdominal approach for the repair of hiatal and diaphragmatic hernias. He performed more than 25,000 mastectomies for breast cancer in his long career.

Harrington wrote 38 peer-reviewed articles in professional journals and lectured extensively.

== Football coach ==
S. W. Harrington
Playing career
- 1908–1909: Penn State
- 1910–1912: Penn
- Position: Halfback

Coaching career (HC unless noted)
- 1913–1914: Dickinson

Head coaching record
- Overall: 6–11

Accomplishments and honors

Awards
- Third team All-American (1912) by The Philadelphia Press

In order to supplement his income as a medical intern in Philadelphia, Harrington served as head football coach at Dickinson College in Carlisle, Pennsylvania for the 1913 and 1914 football seasons. His coaching record at Dickinson was 6–11.

== Retirement and death ==
Harrington retired from active medical practice in the early 1960s. He and his wife, Gertrude, enjoyed automobile trips around the U.S. until Harrington gradually lost his eyesight. He died in Rochester, Minnesota in 1975 and is buried there.
