= Dexter Very =

American football player and official (1889–1980)

- Very at Penn State

Penn State Nittany Lions
- Position: End
- Class: Graduate

Personal information
- Born: November 27, 1889; Fairdale, Pennsylvania, U.S.
- Died: September 27, 1980 (aged 90); State College, Pennsylvania, U.S.
- Listed weight: 165 lb (75 kg)

Career information
- College: Penn State (1909–1912)

Awards and highlights
- National champion (1911); 2× Second-team All-American (1911, 1912)

Dexter W. Very (November 27, 1889 – September 27, 1980) was an American college football player for the Penn State Nittany Lions football team of Pennsylvania State University.

== Biography ==
Very started at right end for the Nittany Lions in every game from 1909 to 1912. During that time, Penn State was undefeated in 1909, 1911 and 1912, while losing just two games in 1910.

Very was elected as the team's captain in 1911, and helped the Nittany Lions defeat the Penn Quakers, for its first victory over Penn in 18 years. That game he stripped the Quakers' Ray Mercer of the football and ran it back for a Penn State touchdown. In 1912, Very scored nine touchdowns in eight games. He never wore a helmet while playing. He was also the Middle Atlantic wrestling champion in 1915 at 158lbs. Very was a member of the Delta Upsilon fraternity, and was elected 1913 class president.

== Early life ==
Very was born in Fairdale, Greene County, in southwestern Pennsylvania. In 1907, he graduated from the Scotland Orphan Industrial School, in Scotland, Pennsylvania, which was later renamed the Scotland School for Veterans' Children.

For two years, before he enrolled at Penn State, Very attended Mercersburg Academy in Mercersburg, Pennsylvania.

== Later years and death ==
After college, Very worked as a manufacturer's representative in Pittsburgh and also had a long career as a football official. He officiated the 1927 Georgia vs. Yale football game. On January 2, 1933, Very officiated the Rose Bowl, and in 1942 he officiated the Army-Navy game. He was inducted into the College Football Hall of Fame in 1976. He died on September 27, 1980.
