= West Fraser Timber =

Canadian forestry company

West Fraser Timber Co. Ltd.

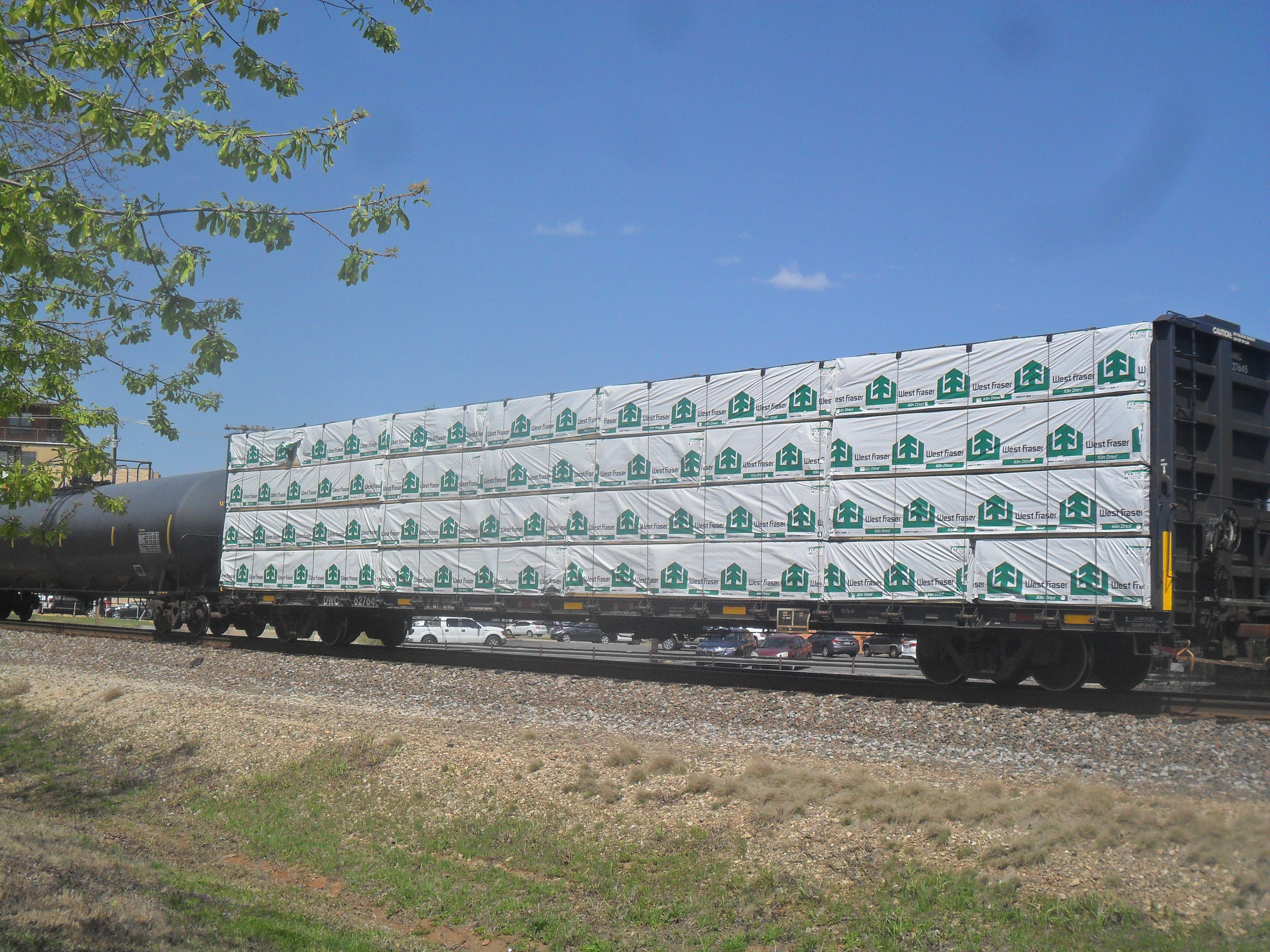
- A railcar loaded with West Fraser lumber
- Company type: Public
- Traded as: TSX: WFG; NYSE: WFG
- Industry: Forestry
- Founded: 1955; 71 years ago in Quesnel, British Columbia
- Headquarters: Vancouver, British Columbia, Canada
- Key people: Sean McLaren, President & CEO; Henry H. Ketcham, Chairman
- Products: Diversified wood-based building materials
- Revenue: ▼US$6.454 billion (2023)
- Operating income: ▼US$−284 millions (2023)
- Net income: ▼US$−167 millions (2023)
- Total assets: ▼US$9.415 billion (2023)
- Total equity: ▼US$7.223 billion (2023)
- Number of employees: 10,800 (2023)
- Website: www.westfraser.com

West Fraser Timber Co. Ltd., commonly known as "West Fraser", is a Canadian forestry company that produces lumber, laminated veneer lumber (LVL), medium-density fibreboard (MDF), oriented strand board (OSB), plywood, pulp, newsprint, and wood chips. Based in Vancouver, British Columbia, the company is a member of the Forest Products Association of Canada. As of 2023, West Fraser had been recognized eight times as one of Canada's Top 100 Employers.

== History ==
West Fraser Timber was founded in 1955 by three brothers from Seattle: Samuel Kendall Ketcham, Henry Holman ("Pete") Ketcham Jr., and William Peters Ketcham. Their father was Hank Ketcham, who played college football for the Yale Bulldogs and was inducted to the College Football Hall of Fame.

The three brothers decided to do business together and purchased a small planing mill in Quesnel, British Columbia. Samual Ketcham served as president of the company until his death in November 1977 in a helicopter crash. He was succeeded by Douglas Johnston, and later by Chester Johnson. Henry H. Ketcham, son of "Pete" Ketcham, became president in 1985. He led the company through an initial public offering in May 1986. Later, Ketcham also became CEO and oversaw the company until 2012. Ted Seraphim subsequently became president and then CEO, until being succeeded by Raymond Ferris as president in April 2018 and CEO in June 2019.

As of 2018, "West Fraser has become the largest lumber manufacturer in North America with 8,600 employees globally – about 5,000 in Western Canada – at about 50 locations."

In April 2020, it was revealed that Canadian business magnate Jim Pattison had upped his stake in West Fraser to 13.8% ownership, prompting speculation that the billionaire had plans to merge the company with Canfor, of which he owns 51%. In response, West Fraser adopted a shareholder rights plan or "poison pill" in order to defend against any attempts at a takeover.

== Operations ==
The company's operations are divided into three major business segments:

- Lumber
- Engineered Wood Products (EWP)
- Pulp & Paper
