= Douglas Bomeisler =

American football player (1892–1953)

Douglass Bomeisler
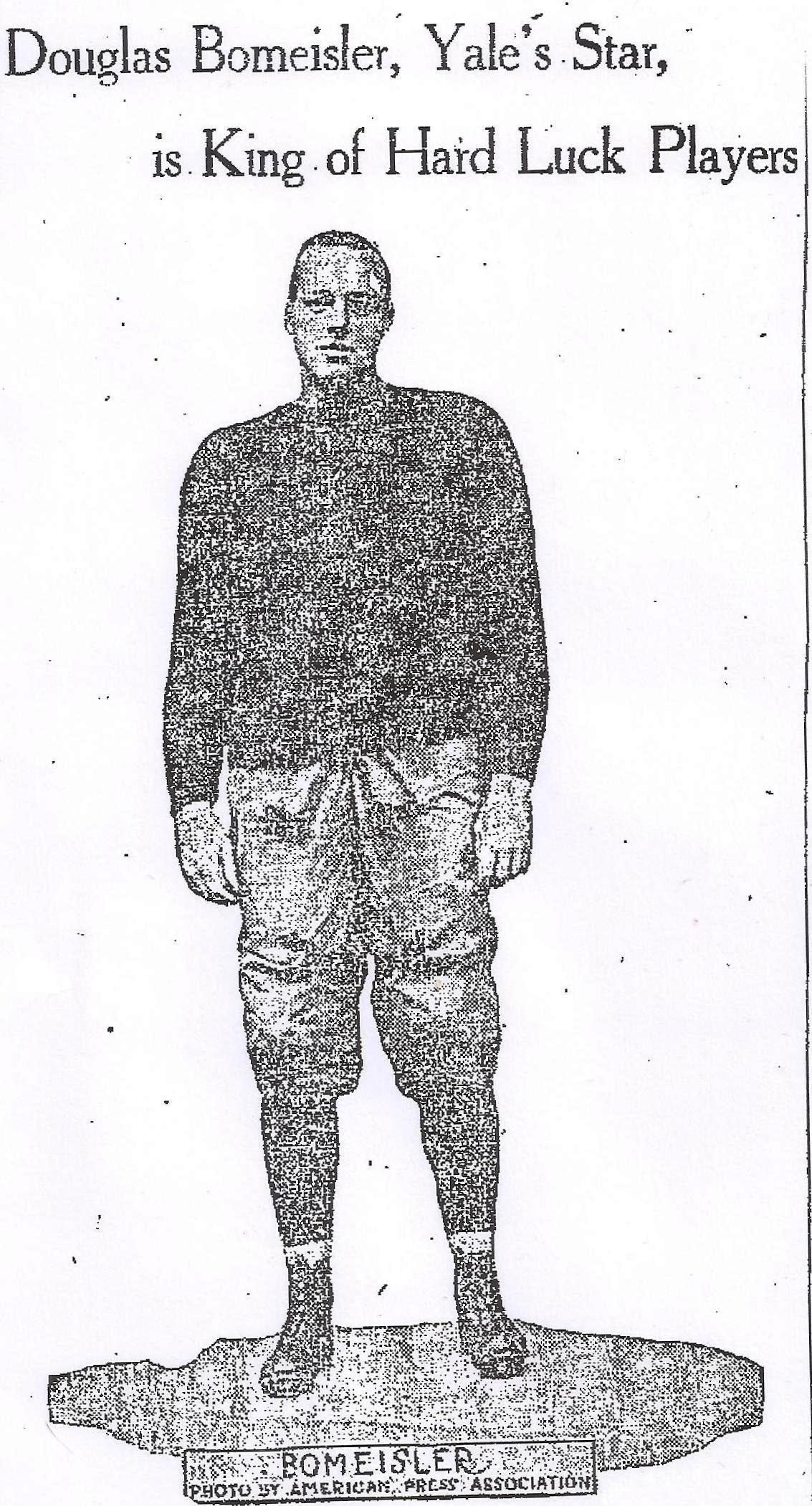

Yale Bulldogs
- Position: End

Personal information
- Born: June 20, 1892; Brooklyn, New York, U.S.
- Died: December 28, 1953 (aged 61); Greenwich, Connecticut, U.S.

Career information
- College: Yale (1910–1912)

Awards and highlights
- 2× Consensus All-American (1911, 1912)
- College Football Hall of Fame

Douglass M. "Bo" Bomeisler (June 20, 1892 – December 28, 1953) was an American college football player. He played for the Yale Bulldogs football team of Yale University from 1910 to 1912, and was selected as a consensus first-team All-American in 1911 and 1912. He was elected to the College Football Hall of Fame in 1972.

== Biography ==
=== Early life ===
Bomeisler was born in Brooklyn, New York. He graduated from what is now called Poly Prep Country Day School where he played football.

=== Yale University ===
He enrolled at Yale University where he played for the school's varsity football team in 1910, 1911 and 1912. Playing at the end position, Bomeisler developed a reputation as a fast and powerful player, "a hard and deadly tackler," and the strongest man on the Yale team.

In his first year of eligibility to play for Yale's varsity football team, Bomeisler was injured in the second game of the 1910 football season and missed the remainder of the season.

Early in the 1911 season, Bomeisler injured his shoulder in the Harvard game but continued to play with the injury. He injured his knee in Yale's 1911 game against Princeton. To allow him to continue to play, Bomeisler fabricated a knee brace from leather and steel. After playing through multiple injuries, Bomeisler was selected as a first-team All-American by Walter Camp and Charles Chadwick. He was also named to the "Football Honor List for 1911," as selected by coaches from the East and West for publication in "Outing" magazine. In selecting Bomeisler as an All-American, Camp wrote that Bomeisler was "powerful, thickset, fast, a terror to his opponents."

In May 1912, Bomeisler was overlooked by Yale's three senior secret societies -- Skull and Bones, Scroll and Key and Wolf's Head. The Washington Post noted that the omission of Bomeisler was one of the greatest surprises of "tap day," making it the first time in many years that the captain of Yale's football team did not make Skull and Bones.

In September 1912, Bomeisler returned to the Yale football team despite his injuries. A profile of the Yale team published early in the 1912 season noted that the Yale coaches were not working him very hard in the early part of the season to avoid aggravating his shoulder injury.

Because of his many injuries, he became known as the "King of the Hard Luck Players," as reflected in the photograph above. A syndicated newspaper report published in November 1912 noted:

"The crown of hard luck king certainly belongs to Douglass Bomeisler, the star Yale end. Injuries kept him out of the majority of games last season, but he recovered in time to make the All American by spectacular work in the game against Harvard. This season he was still more unfortunate, being laid out in the Holy Cross game and not getting into shape until the Princeton game."

In order to protect Bomeisler from further injuries, the Yale coaches kept him out of numerous games, nursing him along so that he would be at his best for Yale's most important matches against Princeton and Harvard. In November 1912, newspapers reported, "All Yale men were enthusiastic over the indicators that the 188 pound whirlwind Bomeisler would be at end." Though Yale lost to Harvard in 1912 by a score of 20–0, Bomeisler was a standout in the game. One newspaper reported:

"What the score might have been had not Bomeisler and Ketcham shown such speedy work in nailing Harvard backs and breaking up the crimson offense, was a subject for speculation tonight. The entire Yale defense seemed to rest on these two players and when Bomeisler was taken out in the second period the crimson offense again became very aggressive."

In selecting Bomeisler as a first-team All-American in 1912, New York sports writer, Monty, wrote:

"Bomeisler, Yale's marvel, was the year's most conspicuous open field tackler, particularly in spilling catches of kicks. He was out of the fray most of the year with a badly injured shoulder, but his sensational work while he lasted in the Harvard game alone would entitle him to the position. Besides these things, both Bomeisler and Felton are stars at taking forward passes."

Despite the injuries, Bomeisler was selected as a first-team All-American for a second time after the 1912 season. He was selected for the honor by Walter Camp for Collier's Weekly, Robert Edgren, Monty, W.J. MacBeth, Tommy Clark, and Parke H. Davis.

=== Post-college years ===
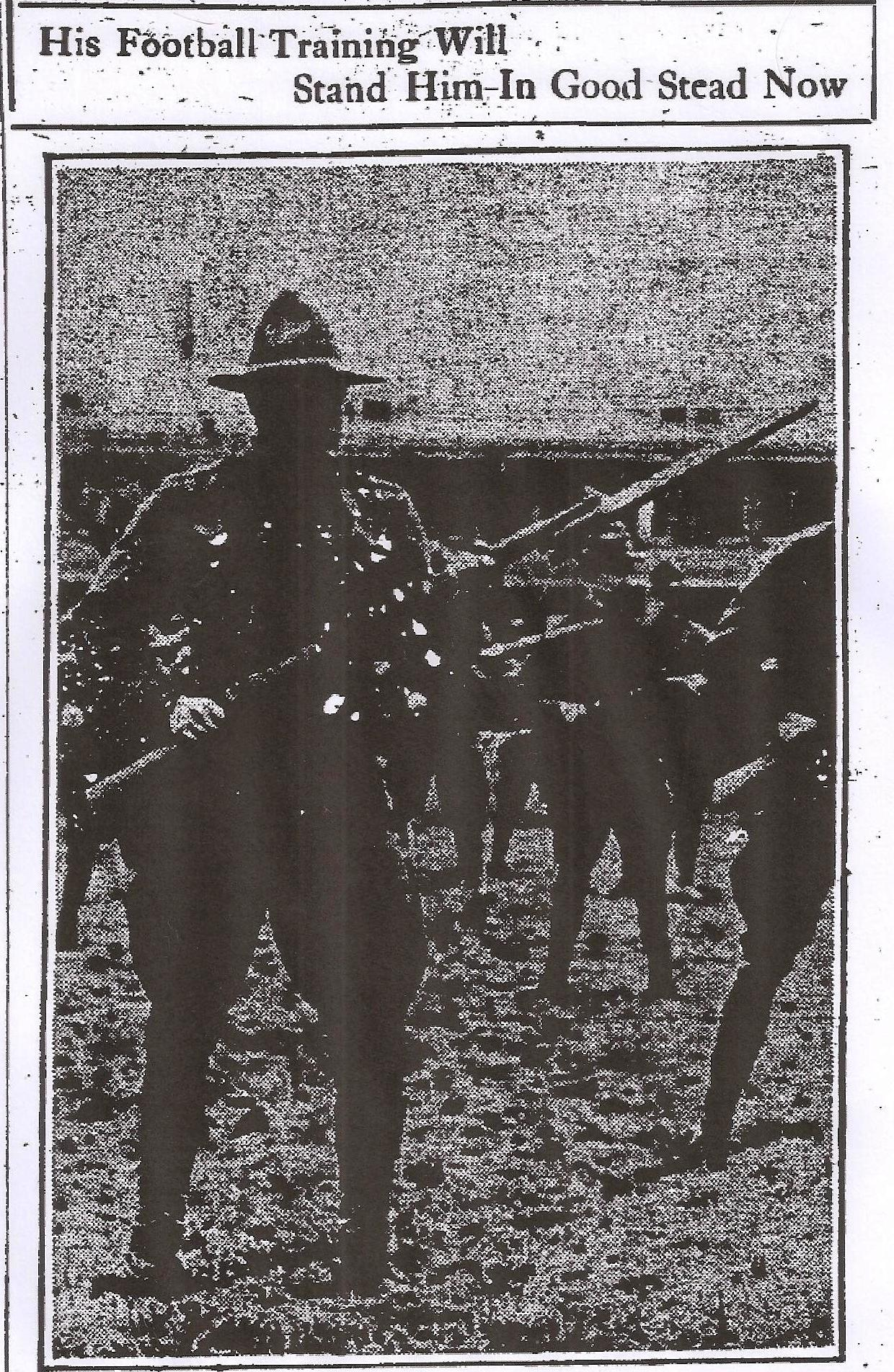
Bomeisler in a bayonet charge at Plattsburgh, New York, in 1917.

After graduating from Yale, Bomeisler went to work for a mill in Lawrence, Massachusetts. Bomeisler also served as an assistant coach for the Yale in 1913. He was an assistant to the Hall of Fame coach Howard Jones, who was Yale's first salaried resident football instructor.

In April 1914, he was seriously injured when he was struck by a trolley car at the corner of Flatbush Avenue and Livingston Street in Brooklyn. While escorting a young woman friend, a trolley car jumped the tracks, and Bomeisler got into the path of the car to protect his companion. His foot was crushed against a pillar, and the injury was so serious that it was anticipated that he may be "slightly crippled for life."

=== World War I ===
By 1917, Bomeisler had recovered sufficiently from his injury to enlist in the U.S. Army following the entry of the United States into World War I. After initial training at Plattsburgh, New York, Bomeisler was assigned to Camp Upton at Yaphank on Long Island, where he also played on the camp's football team along with former Harvard football star Bob Storer. Bomeisler' photograph, practicing a bayonet charge, was published under the headline, "His Football Training Will Stand Him In Good Stead Now." The article noted: "If Bomeisler ever gets a chance for action he, no doubt, will account for a few of the enemy. He is one of the finest specimens of manhood at the officer training camp. … Those who have seen him here say that he will make a splendid soldier."

=== Later life ===
In later years, Bomeisler went into the banking profession and served as the vice president of the Empire Trust Company of New York and a director of the Greenpoint Savings Bank of Brooklyn.

Bomeisler died at age 61 in 1953 at his home in Greenwich, Connecticut.

=== College Football Hall of Fame ===
In 1972, Douglass M. Bomeisler was posthumously inducted into the National Football Foundation Hall of Fame as part of a class that included Everett Strupper, Bart Macomber, Ray Eichenlaub and Percy Wendell.
