= Ketchum (surname) =

Ketchum is a surname that originated in England. Notable people and fictional characters with the surname include:

== People ==
- Annie Chambers Ketchum (1824–1904), religious name Sister Amabilis, American educator, lecturer and writer
- Daniel Ketchum (born 1981), American swimmer
- David Ketchum (1928–2025), American actor
- Gerald Ketchum (1908–1992), American US Navy officer
- Gus Ketchum (1897–1980), American baseball player
- Hal Ketchum (1953–2020), American singer-songwriter
- Henry Ketchum (1839–1886), Canadian engineer
- Jack Ketchum (1946–2018), American horror writer
- James S. Ketchum (1931–2019), American psychiatrist
- Jesse Ketchum (1782–1867), Canadian tanner and politician
- Menis E. Ketchum (born 1943), American politician and jurist
- Morris Ketchum (1796–1880), American banker and financier
- Richard Ketchum (1773–1845), American politician
- Richard M. Ketchum (1922–2012), American historian and magazine editor
- Robert Glenn Ketchum (born 1947), American photographer
- Rosemary Ketchum (born 1993), American politician and community organizer
- Tom Ketchum (1863–1901), a.k.a. "Black Jack" Ketchum, American outlaw
- Wesley Harrington Ketchum (1878–1968), American physician
- William Ketchum (mayor) (1798–1876), American politician
- William M. Ketchum (1921–1978), American businessman and politician
- William Scott Ketchum (1813–1871), US Army officer

== Fictional characters ==
- Ash Ketchum, a fictional Pokémon Trainer figure
  - Delia Ketchum, his mother
- Kevin Ketchum, an OZ prisoner
