= Fairdale, Pennsylvania =

Unincorporated community in Pennsylvania, US

- Census-designated place
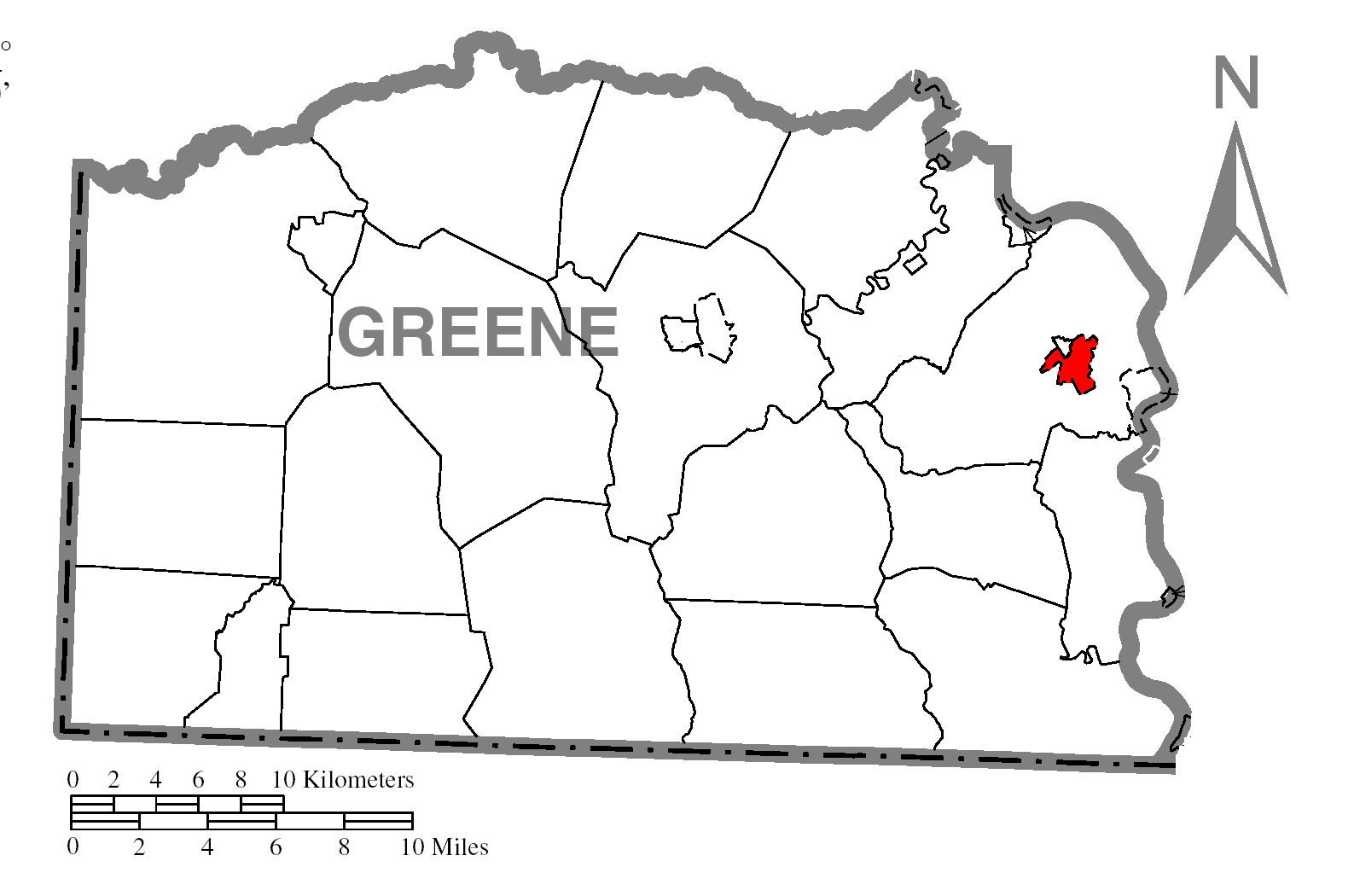
- Location of Fairdale in Greene County
- Coordinates: 39°53′34″N 79°58′22″W
- Country: United States
- State: Pennsylvania
- County: Greene
- Township: Cumberland

Area
  - Total: 1.45 sq mi (3.75 km^{2})
  - Land: 1.44 sq mi (3.74 km^{2})
  - Water: 0.0039 sq mi (0.01 km^{2})

Population (2020)
  - Total: 2,064
  - Density: 1,430.8/sq mi (552.43/km^{2})
- Time zone: UTC-4 (EST)
  - Summer (DST): UTC-5 (EDT)
- ZIP code: 15320
- Area code: 724
- FIPS code: 42-24544

Fairdale is a community and census-designated place (CDP) in Greene County, Pennsylvania, United States. The population was 2,059 at the 2010 census.

== Geography ==
Fairdale is located at 39°53′34″N 79°58′22″W (39.892667, -79.972691).

According to the United States Census Bureau, the CDP has a total area of 1.4 square miles (3.6 km^{2}), all land.

Fairdale is south of Carmichaels on PA 88.

== Demographics ==
Historical population
Census	Pop.	Note	%±
2000	1,955		—
2010	2,059		5.3%
2020	2,064		0.2%
U.S. Decennial Census

As of the census of 2000, there were 1,955 people, 868 households, and 540 families residing in the CDP. The population density was 1,378.2 inhabitants per square mile (532.1/km^{2}). There were 926 housing units at an average density of 652.8 per square mile (252.0/km^{2}). The racial makeup of the CDP was 98.72% White, 0.10% African American, 0.31% Native American, 0.05% Asian, 0.05% from other races, and 0.77% from two or more races. Hispanic or Latino of any race were 0.26% of the population.

There were 868 households, out of which 24.8% had children under the age of 18 living with them, 47.1% were married couples living together, 12.2% had a female householder with no husband present, and 37.7% were non-families. 34.7% of all households were made up of individuals, and 18.0% had someone living alone who was 65 years of age or older. The average household size was 2.20 and the average family size was 2.82.

In the CDP, the population was spread out, with 20.6% under the age of 18, 7.3% from 18 to 24, 24.5% from 25 to 44, 25.8% from 45 to 64, and 21.9% who were 65 years of age or older. The median age was 44 years. For every 100 females, there were 88.7 males. For every 100 females age 18 and over, there were 80.6 males.

The median income for a household in the CDP was $24,833, and the median income for a family was $34,750. Males had a median income of $41,193 versus $21,774 for females. The per capita income for the CDP was $15,275. About 14.8% of families and 23.5% of the population were below the poverty line, including 27.9% of those under age 18 and 20.4% of those age 65 or over.
