= Vince Pazzetti =

American football player (1890–1972)

Vince "Pat" Pazzetti
Profile
- Position: Quarterback

Personal information
- Born: January 1, 1890; Wellesley, Massachusetts, U.S.
- Died: August 3, 1972 (aged 82); Bethlehem, Pennsylvania, U.S.

Career information
- College: Wesleyan (1908–1909); Lehigh (1911–1912)

Awards and highlights
- Second-team All-American (1912)
- College Football Hall of Fame (Class of 1961)

Vince Pazzetti (January 1, 1890 – August 3, 1972) was an American football player, graduating from Lehigh University in 1912. He later went on to be the general manager of Bethlehem Steel's Bethlehem Plant. He was elected to the College Football Hall of Fame in 1961.
