= Wesley Englehorn =

American football player and coach (1890–1993)

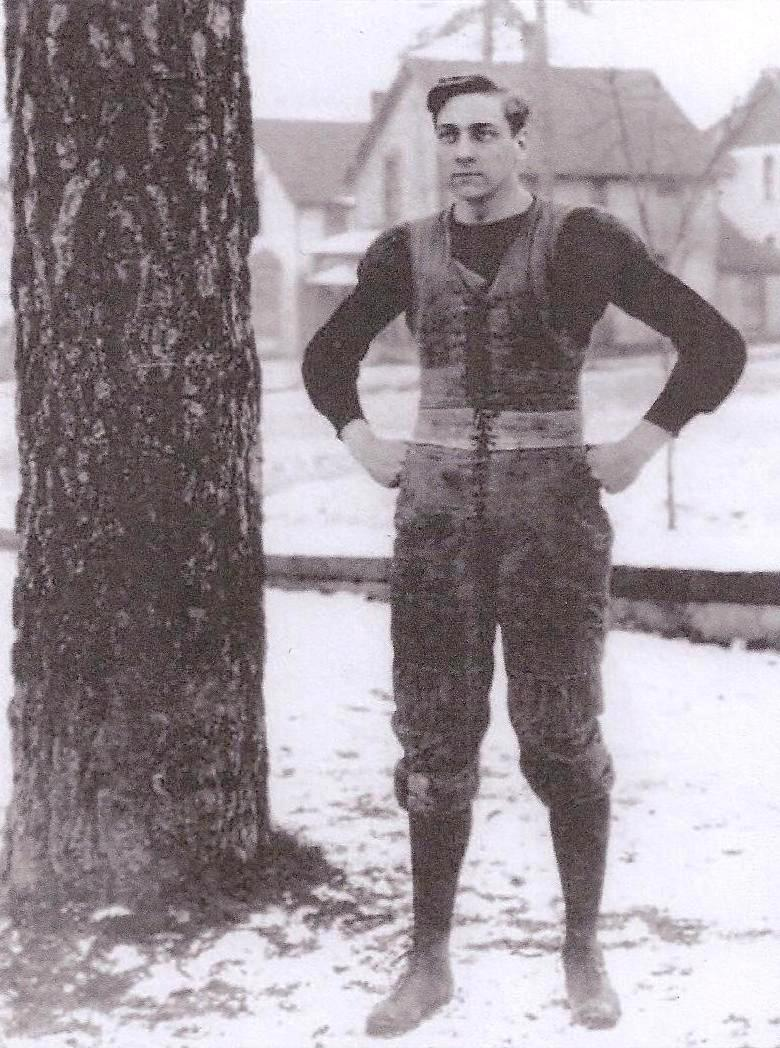
- Englehorn in 1912

Biographical details
- Born: January 21, 1890; Spokane, Washington, U.S.
- Died: September 3, 1993 (aged 103); Philadelphia, Pennsylvania, U.S.

Playing career
- 1909: Washington State
- 1911–1912: Dartmouth
- Position: Tackle

Coaching career (HC unless noted)
- 1913: Dartmouth (assistant)
- 1914–1916: Case
- 1920: Boston College (assistant)
- 1921: Amherst

Head coaching record
- Overall: 18–18–3

Accomplishments and honors

Awards
- Consensus All-American (1912)

Wesley Theodore "Moose" Englehorn (January 21, 1890 – September 3, 1993) was an American college football player and coach.

== Career ==
Englehorn was born on January 21, 1890, to Herman and Emma Lenz, Englehorn attended Spokane High School, where he played basketball, football, and track and field. While a junior, he was reportedly recruited by Princeton University to play football. Englehorn declined Princeton and instead played for two years for the All-Star Pacific Northwest basketball and football teams.

Englehorn chose to attend Washington State College, where he played football for the Cougars. After one year there, he transferred to Dartmouth College, where he played tackle for two years for the Big Green. In 1912, Englehorn was selected as a consensus pick for the College Football All-America Team.

Englehorn was elected team captain for the 1913 season, but was declared ineligible due to a "three-year rule". Instead, he and Jogger Elcock served as a team assistants, under coach Frank Cavanaugh, in 1913. Englehorn ultimately graduated from Dartmouth in 1914.

In 1914, Englehorn was hired as the head coach at the Case School of Applied Science in Cleveland. During his tenure at Case, in 1915, he married Viola S. Snead (1892-1978), with whom he had two children: Mary Louise (1917-1987) and Jane (1921-2001).

In 1917, Englehorn was hired as line coach and lead assistant for Colgate University. However, he resigned before the season began to become secretary of the Cleveland Advertising Club. He remained with the club until January 1, 1919, when he resigned to join the foreign trade department of the First National Bank of Boston. The following year, Englehorn reunited with coach Cavanaugh as an assistant at Boston College.

In 1921, Englehorn was hired as the head coach at Amherst College. Just a year later, he announced his retirement from coaching, and was replaced by Tuss McLaughry.

During the 1920s, Englehorn lived in California, where he was president of the Lee Investment Company and a director of the Central California Mortgage Company. He worked for the federal government from 1935 to 1960 and was the Philadelphia-based regional director for the War Manpower Commission during World War II.

Prior to his death on September 3, 1993, at the age of 103, Englehorn was living at Stapeley Hall, a retirement community in Germantown, and at the time, was the oldest living All-American college football player. He was buried at Chapel of the Chimes in Oakland.

== Head coaching record ==
Year	Team	Overall	Conference	Standing	Bowl/playoffs
Case (Ohio Athletic Conference) (1914–1916)
1914	Case	4–6	3–4	7th	
1915	Case	5–5–1	4–2–1	6th	
1916	Case	5–5	4–3	6th	
Case:		14–16–1	11–9–1		
Amherst Lord Jeffs (Little Three Conference) (1921)
1921	Amherst	4–2–2			
Amherst:		4–2–2			
Total:		18–18–3			

== See also ==
- List of centenarians (sportspeople)
