= Henry H. Ketcham =

Canadian business executive

Henry Holman Ketcham III (born December 1, 1949), also known as "Hank" Ketcham, (Note: Not to be confused with his paternal grandfather and namesake Henry Holman Ketcham, commonly known as Hank Ketcham (1891–1986).) is a Canadian business executive, best known for serving as president and CEO of West Fraser Timber.

== Biography ==
Ketcham became president of West Fraser Timber in 1985; later he also became CEO and oversaw the company until 2012. The company was founded by his father and two of his uncles; the three brothers were sons of Hank Ketcham, who played college football for the Yale Bulldogs and was inducted to the College Football Hall of Fame.

Ketcham was a 1996 recipient of the Order of British Columbia. In 1999, he was appointed an independent board member of TD Bank.
