= Robert Treat Paine Storer =

American football player (1893–1962)

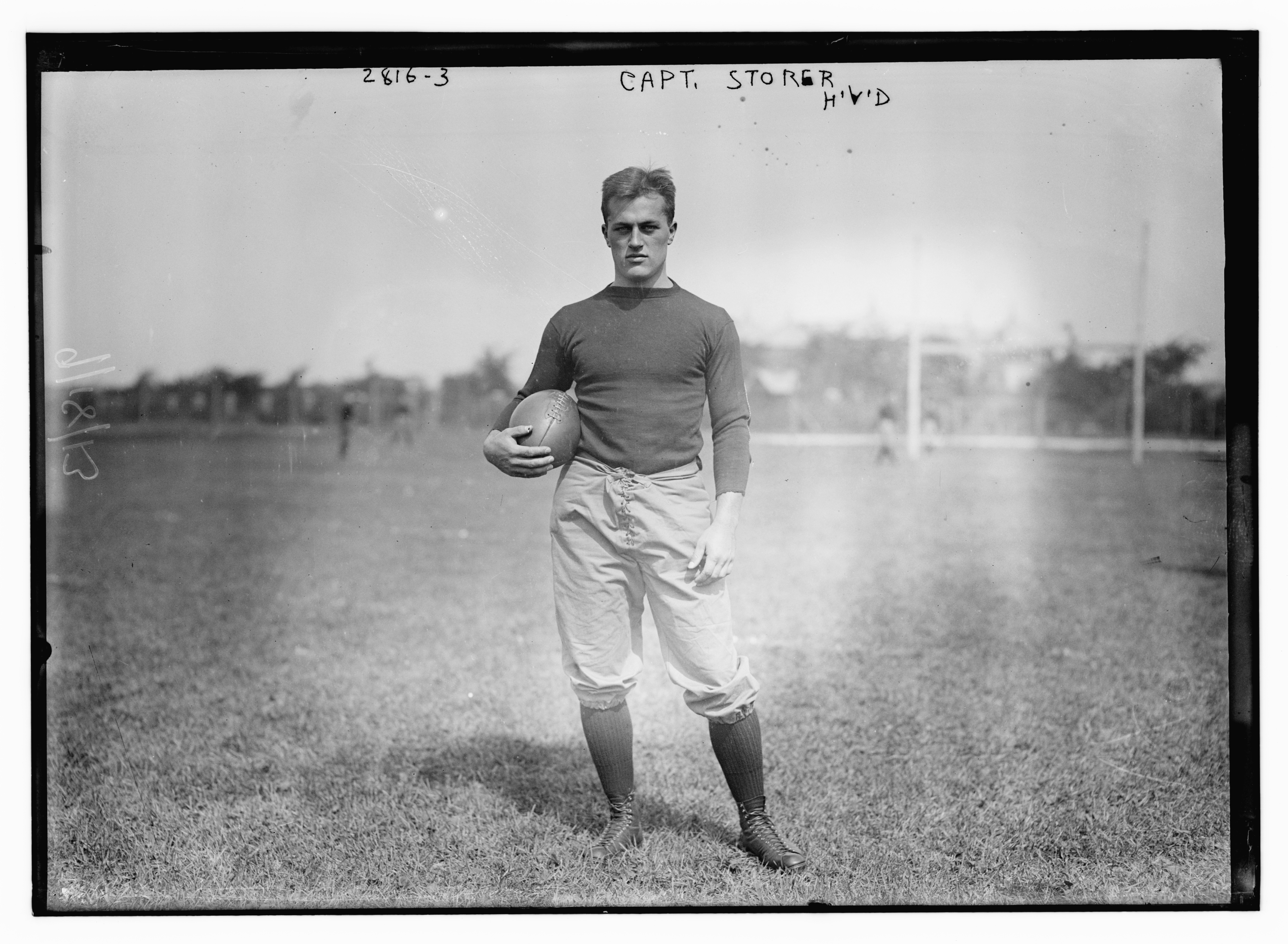

Profile
- Position: Tackle

Personal information
- Born: April 17, 1893; Boston, Massachusetts, U.S.
- Died: February 5, 1962 (aged 68); Cambridge, Massachusetts, U.S.

Career information
- College: Harvard

Awards and highlights
- 2× National champion (1912, 1913); First-team All-American (1912); Second-team All-American (1913)

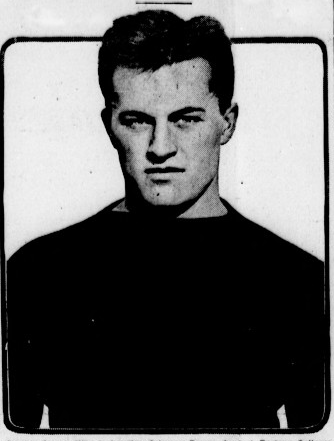
Robert Treat Paine Storer in the Chicago Eagle, 1913.

Robert Treat Paine Storer (April 17, 1893 – February 5, 1962) was an American football player for Harvard University. In 1912, he scored Harvard's first touchdown against Yale since 1901 and was selected as a first-team All-American at the tackle position. In 1913, he was captain of Harvard's last undefeated, untied football team until 2001. During World War I, Storer was cited for bravery for his actions in saving a French officer while on a reconnaissance mission.

== Biography ==
=== Early life ===
Storer was a native of Boston, Massachusetts, and the grandson of Dr. Horatio Robinson Storer (1830–1922), a Boston gynecologist. He was the son of John Humphreys Storer (b. 1859) and Edith Paine, daughter of lawyer Robert Treat Paine. Storer attended preparatory school at Noble and Greenough School in Boston, where he played football at the center position. He was 5 feet, 9 inches tall and weighed 180 pounds.

=== Harvard ===
Storer enrolled at Harvard University in 1910 and played at the center position on the freshman football team. As a sophomore in 1911, he played for Harvard's varsity football team, moving from center to the tackle position. He also played tackle for Harvard's football team in 1912 and 1913.

In 1912, Storer scored Harvard's first touchdown in the Yale game, making him the first Harvard player to score a touchdown against Yale since Thomas Graydon accomplished the feat in 1901. He was selected as a first-team All-American in 1912 by Robert Edgren, W.J. MacBeth, and Tommy Clark.

In January 1913, his teammates selected him as the captain of the 1913 Harvard football team. The 1913 team was the last undefeated, untied Harvard team (9-0-0) until the 2001 team matched the feat. Storer saved the perfect record in a close game with Princeton in 1913. Playing on a muddy field, Storer blocked a Princeton punt and fell on the ball. Teammate Charley Brickley then drop-kicked the ball from the 19-yard line for the only points scored in the game.

=== World War I ===
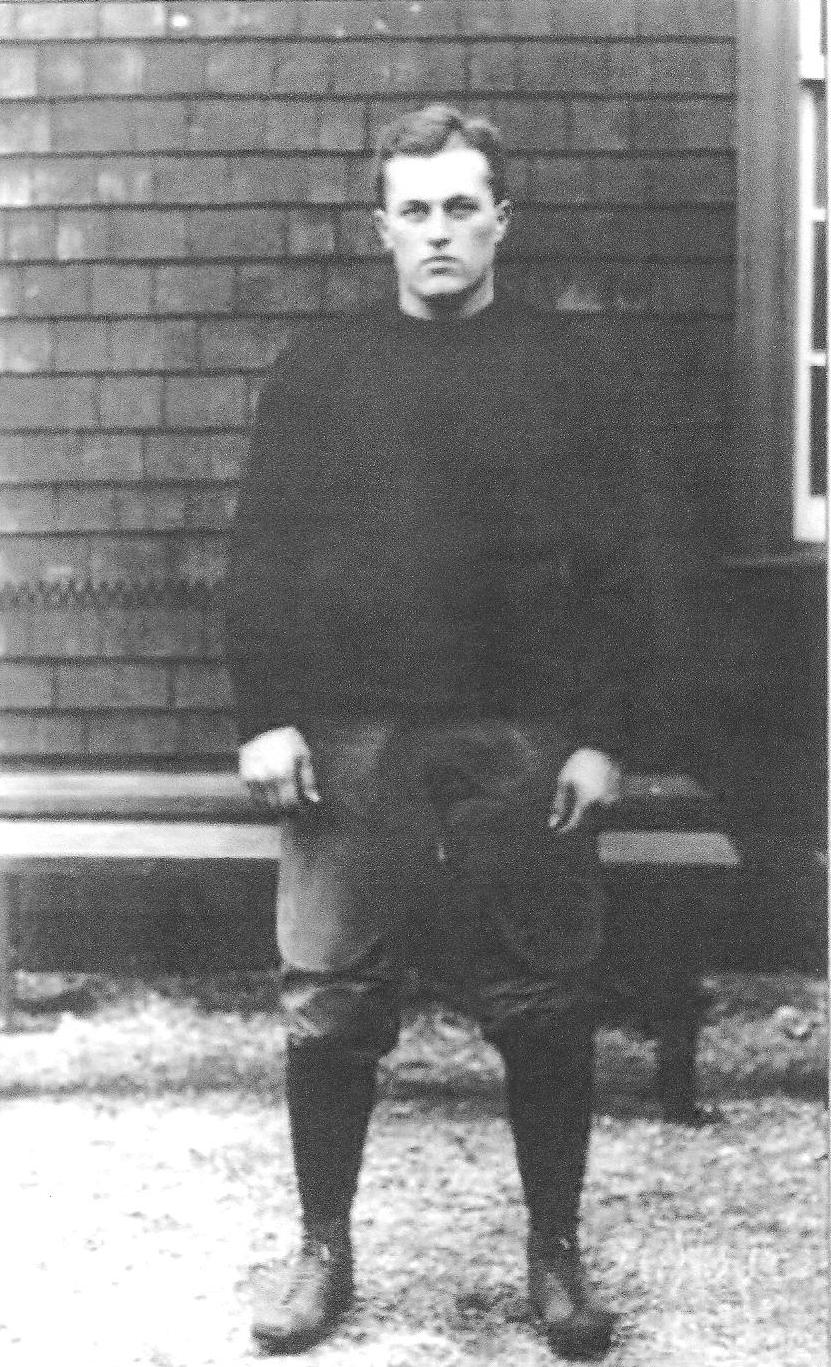
Bob Storer while playing for Harvard, c. 1913

During World War I, Storer served in the U.S. Army, attained the rank of major, and served as the commander of Battery E of the 305th Field Artillery. He was cited for bravery for his actions on September 6, 1918. While reconnoitering a forward position for his battery near Serval, France, Storer passed outside the American lines and carried on his reconnaissance until stopped by fire from German snipers that wounded a French officer accompanying Storer. "Although under carefully directed fire and in grave danger, he attended the French lieutenant and remained with him for four hours until under cover of darkness he was able to help him to a place of safety."

=== Later life ===
Storer served as a member of the board of directors of Boston YMCA starting in 1924 and was elected president of the organization in 1936. He also served as chairman of the management committee of the Army and Navy YMCA.

Storer was also the President of The Storer Associates, Inc., and had a long association with Boston's Northeastern University. He was a member of Northeastern's board of trustees from 1936 until at least 1960 and a member of the Executive Committee from 1936-1943.

Storer was married to his first cousin, Dorothy (Paine) Storer. Their son Robert Treat Paine Storer, Jr., was a noted real estate developer and philanthropist in Boston.

== See also ==
- 1912 College Football All-America Team
