= Sam Felton =

American football and baseball player

Samuel Felton
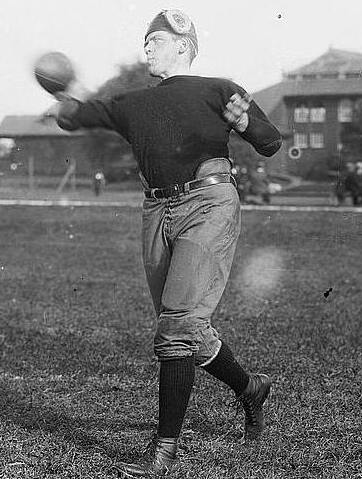

Profile
- Position: End

Career information
- College: Harvard

Awards and highlights
- National champion (1912); Consensus All-American (1912)

Samuel M. Felton was an American football and baseball player. He was an All-American end for Harvard University in 1912. After graduating from Harvard, Felton declined a record offer to play Major League Baseball for Connie Mack's Philadelphia Athletics.

== Biography ==
Felton attended Harvard University where he played American football at the end position in 1911 and 1912. He also handled punting and kicking duties for Harvard's football team.

As a junior in 1911, Felton was one of the leaders of a football team that opened the season 5–0 while outscoring opponents 72–6. However, Felton was seriously injured in the first period of the fifth game of the season—a win over Brown University. Felton was kicked in the side. The New York Times reported that, because Felton was not wearing any protective pads over his hips, the kick broke several blood vessels and formed a clot. Following the injury to Felton, the previously-undefeated Harvard team went 1–2–1 in its final four games.

Felton returned to the Harvard football team as a senior and helped lead the 1912 team to a perfect 9–0 record. Felton was regarded as the best punter in the country during the 1912 season, with punts averaging from 60 to 70 yards. Four decades later, sports writer Grantland Rice included Felton on his list of the finest college kickers he had ever seen. Felton and Charley Brickley were "credited with having won the intercollegiate championship for the [Harvard] Crimson" in 1912. At the end of the 1912 season, Felton was selected as a first-team All-American in 1912 by Walter Camp (for Collier's Weekly), Robert Edgren, W.J. MacBeth, Alfred S. Harvey of the Milwaukee Free Press, Parke H. Davis, and the Trenton Evening Times.

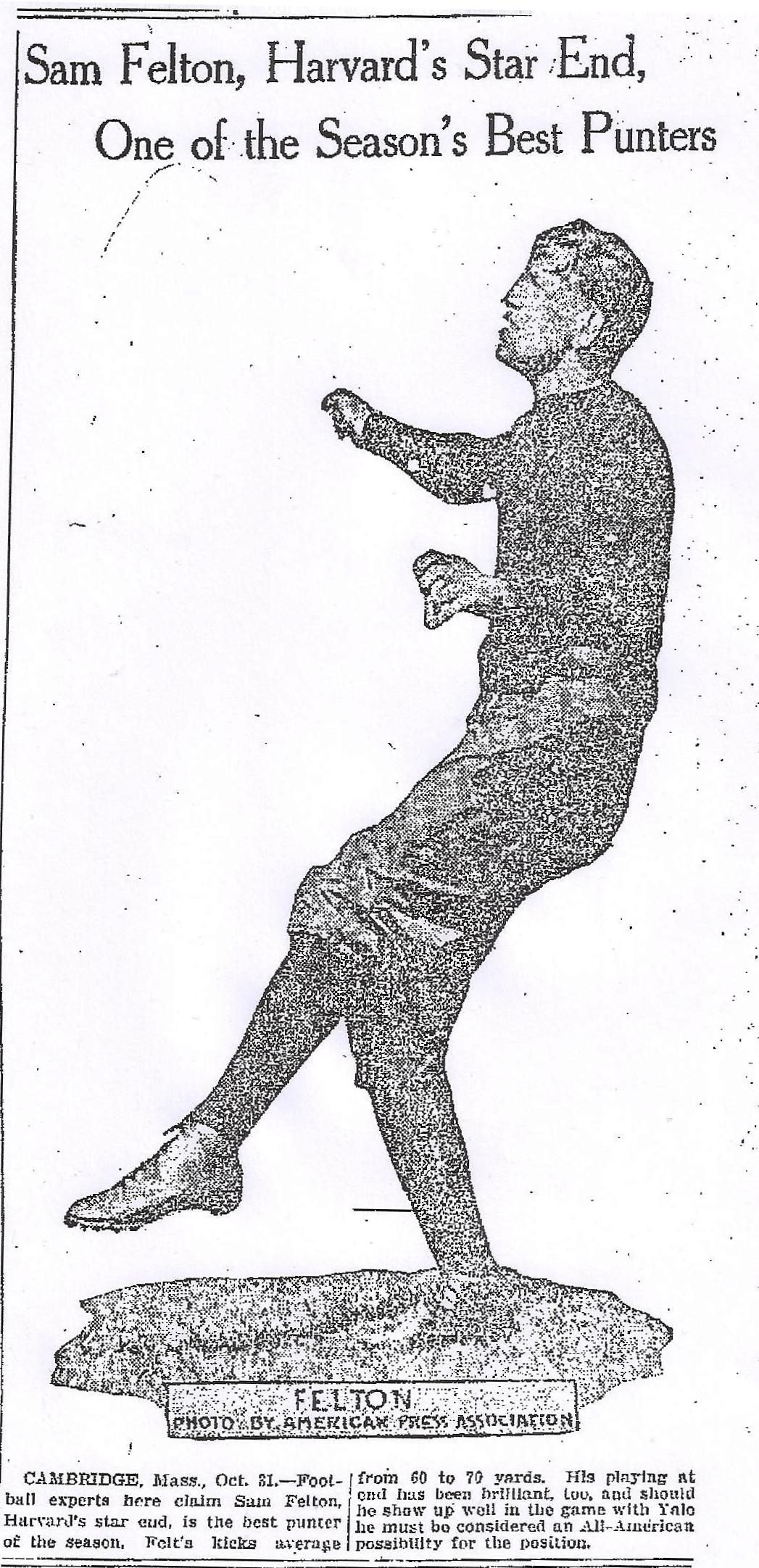
Felton of Harvard

Felton was also a star pitcher for the Harvard baseball team for three years from 1911–1913. In May 1913, Felton pitched a one-hit shutout against Amherst College. The New York Times reported on the game as follows: "Harvard shut out Amherst, 5 to 0, this afternoon because of the masterful pitching of Sam Felton, the former football end rush and punter. Felton held the visitors to one single, this being made in the first inning by Kimball, Amherst's first batter to face Felton. Kimball's hit was a scratch, being nearly smothered by Capt. Wingate ..." Felton's pitching also helped lead Harvard to win the series against Yale in 1913, and the team presented Felton.

Upon his graduation from Harvard in 1913, Connie Mack offered Felton a three-year contract to pitch for the Philadelphia Athletics for $15,000 per year. The offer was a record for a collegiate player and was turned down by Felton. Felton declined the offer to return to his home in Haverford, Pennsylvania and pursue a career in business. The Washington Post reported on the offer as follows:

"Manager Mack, of the Athletics, usually regarded as one of the most conservative bidders for ball players, recently made a record offer for a college player, and, after striving as he has never before done, failed to gain the coveted contract. This much sought collegian, whom Mack thinks would have made one of the greatest pitchers In the history of the game, is Samuel Felton, football and baseball star at Harvard for three years. Within the past month Mack offered Felton a flat contract of $15,000 for three years, agreeing to permit him to make his own terms and giving him the option of an unconditional release should he tire of professional ball, but the persuasion of the Athletics' manager failed. Felton, who lives at Haverford, Pa., comes of a wealthy family, and does not have to play ball for a living, besides being actively engaged in business here."

In October 1914, the Harvard baseball team presented Felton with a silver loving cup for his contributions to Harvard's success. On the day before his wedding in October 1913, The New York Times reported that Harvard's undergraduates "jammed the Union" to give Felton "a rousing send-off."

In 1921, he was selected to serve on the Harvard baseball team's advisory staff.
