= George Crowther (American football) =

American football player (1891–1963)

Brown Bears
- Position: Quarterback

Personal information
- Born: October 3, 1891; Fitchburg, Massachusetts, U.S.
- Died: July 23, 1963 (aged 71); Massachusetts, U.S.

Career information
- College: Brown

Awards and highlights
- Consensus All-American (1912)

George M. "Kid" Crowther (October 3, 1891 – July 23, 1963) was an American football player. He was named the consensus All-American at quarterback in 1912.

== Biography ==
A native of Fitchburg, Massachusetts, Crowther enrolled at Brown University where he played three years of varsity football. He was Brown's starting quarterback from 1910 to 1912. He scored 77 points on 14 touchdowns and a field goal during his career at Brown. Crowther was considered "a slippery runner with good speed." Crowther did not wear a helmet and instead played with a white elastic band around his head.

Various accounts indicate that he weighed between 130 and 135 pounds while playing football at Brown. He received the nickname "Kid" because of his small size. In a game against Harvard in 1912, the Harvard coach suggested that the diminutive Crowther should be removed for the game "for his own safety," and Crowther responded with a 48-yard run for a touchdown in the game. Crowther's run was Brown's only touchdown against Harvard; one newspaper described the play as follows: "The last period was played in twilight and it was then that Crowther, the Brown quarter back, ran half the length of the field for Brown's only touchdown."

Crowther also handled kickoff and punt returns for Brown, and in 1911 he tied the Brown record for the longest kickoff return with a 110-yard return against UMass. Crowther also had other long runs, including a 65-yard kickoff return against Bowdoin. He also led Brown to a 30–7 win over Penn, Crowther reportedly "returned punts like a demon, and crisply directed four touchdown drives that had the fans at old Andrews Field delirious with joy." At the end of the 1912 season, Crowthers was selected as a first-team All-American at the quarterback position by Walter Camp (for Collier's Weekly) and W.J. MacBeth.

Crowther also played baseball at Brown and later in semi-professional leagues around New England.

Crowther graduated from Brown in 1913. He later recalled playing against Jim Thorpe in a Thanksgiving Day game against the Carlisle Indian School. He described Thorpe as the "best I ever played against."

Crowther lived in Fitchburg, Massachusetts in his later years. His wife, Elizabeth Crowther, died in September 1962. Crowther died less than a year later in July 1963.

Crowther was posthumously inducted into the Brown University Hall of Fame in 1972.
