= Everett Bacon =

American football player (1890–1989)

Wesleyan Cardinals
- Position: Quarterback

Personal information
- Born: August 18, 1890; Westbrook, Connecticut, U.S.
- Died: February 1, 1989 (age 98); Southampton, New York, U.S.

Career information
- College: Wesleyan (1910–1912)
- College Football Hall of Fame

C. Everett "Ev" Bacon (August 18, 1890 – February 1, 1989) was an American football quarterback in college. He was also a star athlete in baseball, basketball, tennis, and golf.

Bacon was twice an All-American in football (1910 and 1912). He was "one of only two players not from an Ivy League institution on the 1912 team. One of the other All-Americans on the 1912 team was Jim Thorpe." As an undergraduate at Wesleyan University (class of 1913), Bacon helped pioneer the use of the forward pass.

In 1966, Bacon was inducted into the College Football Hall of Fame. Since 1936, Wesleyan has awarded the C. Everett Bacon Award to the institution's Most Valuable Football Player.

Wesleyan's Bacon Field House, a 70,000-square-foot (6,500 m^{2}) field house, was named to honor him.

He is interred at the Indian Hill Cemetery in Middletown, Connecticut.
