= Pete Mauthe =

American football player and coach (1890–1967)

- Mauthe during his college career at Penn State

Biographical details
- Born: July 8, 1890; Turkey City, Pennsylvania, U.S.
- Died: January 1, 1967 (aged 76); Youngstown, Ohio, U.S.

Playing career
- 1909–1912: Penn State
- Position: Fullback

Coaching career (HC unless noted)
- 1913: Gettysburg

Head coaching record
- Overall: 3–6–1

Accomplishments and honors

Championships
- 2× National (1911, 1912)
- College Football Hall of Fame; Inducted in 1957 (profile)

James Lester "Pete" Mauthe (July 8, 1890 – January 1, 1967) was an American football player who lettered four years as a fullback for the Penn State Nittany Lions from 1909 to 1912. During that timespan, Penn State was undefeated in 1909, 1911 and 1912, while losing just two games in 1910. In 1911, Mauthe scored a 35-yard field goal to defeat the rival Pitt Panthers, 3–0. In 1912 he was named the team's captain and led Penn State to an 8–0 record. That season, he scored a 51-yard field goal against Pitt.

Mauthe was a member of Phi Sigma Kappa fraternity while at Penn State.

In 1913, Mauthe was named the head coach for Gettysburg College and led that team to a 3–6–1 record. He later graduated from college with a degree in metallurgy. He then joined Youngstown Sheet and Tube Co. and later became that company's president. Other significant positions held include roles as president and director of the Olga Coal Company, the Buckeye Coal Company, and the Youngstown Mines Corporation, and he was a director of Carbon Limestone Company. He began his career as a blast furnace laborer with the Carnegie Steel Company.

In 1964, he was awarded the Distinguished Alumnus Award by Penn State. He served on the board of trustees at both Penn State and Youngstown State University and established a scholarship at Penn State for engineering students.

Mauthe was elected to the College Football Hall of Fame in 1957.
