= Percy Wendell =

American football player and sports coach (1889–1932)

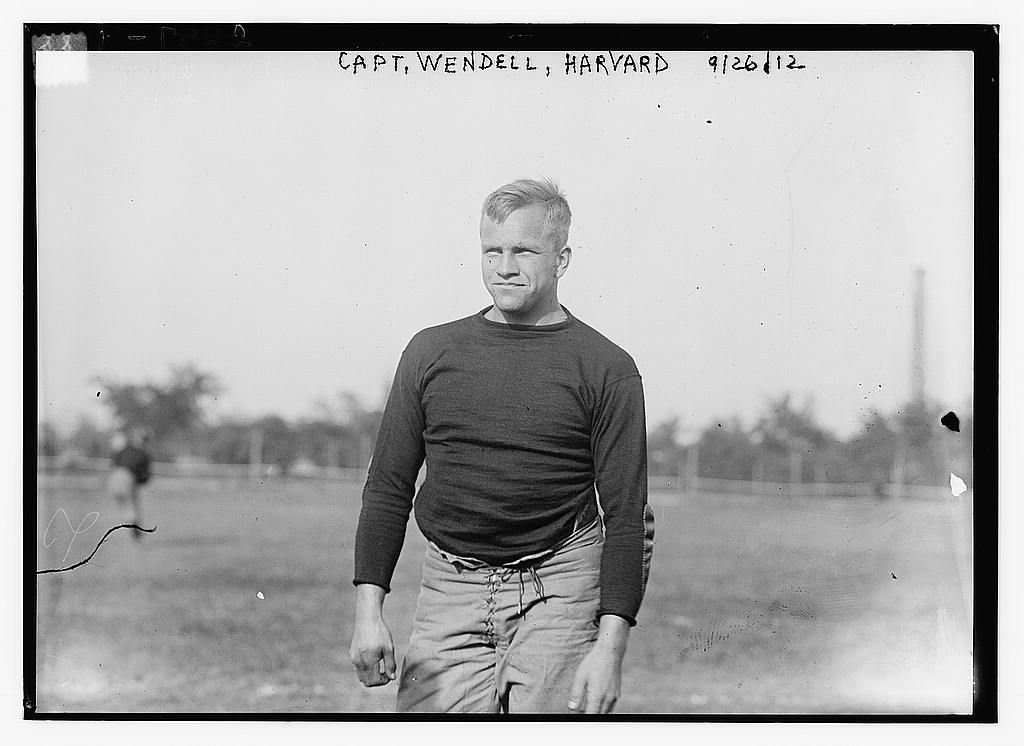
- Wendell at Harvard in 1912

Biographical details
- Born: July 16, 1889; Roxbury, Massachusetts, U.S.
- Died: March 13, 1932 (aged 42); Boston, Massachusetts, U.S.

Playing career

Football
- 1910–1912: Harvard
- Position: Halfback

Coaching career (HC unless noted)

Football
- 1920: Boston University
- 1921–1924: Williams
- 1925–1927: Lehigh

Basketball
- 1919–1920: Boston University

Head coaching record
- Overall: 30–33–4 (football); 0–6 (basketball)

Accomplishments and honors

Awards
- 2× consensus All-American (1910, 1911); Second-team All-American (1912)
- College Football Hall of Fame; Inducted in 1972 (profile)

Percy Langdon "Bullet" Wendell (July 16, 1889 – March 13, 1932) was an American football player and coach of football and basketball. He played college football at Harvard University, where he was a three-time All-American from 1910 to 1912. Wendell served as the head football coach at Boston University in 1920, at Williams College from 1921 to 1924, and at Lehigh University from 1925 to 1927, compiling a career college football coaching record of 30–33–4. He was also the head basketball coach at Boston University for one season, in 1919–20, tallying a mark of 0–6. Wendell was elected to the College Football Hall of Fame as a player in 1972.

== Biography ==
Wendell was born on July 16, 1889, in Roxbury, Massachusetts to Frank Thaxter Wendell and Helen Stamford. He attended the Roxbury Latin School and attended Harvard University from 1909 to 1913. He went on to attend two years of medical school.

Wendell was issued a patent (US 1043649) for a design of football nose armor (also referred to as a nose mask or nose guard), a piece of protective equipment used in the early days of football before helmets with face masks.

Wendell was the 16th head football coach at Lehigh University in Bethlehem, Pennsylvania and he held that position for three seasons, from 1925 until 1927. His record at Lehigh was 5–20–2.

Wendell died of pneumonia, on March 13, 1932, in Boston, Massachusetts.

== Head coaching record ==
=== Football ===
Year	Team	Overall	Conference	Standing	Bowl/playoffs
Boston University (Independent) (1920)
1920	Boston University	4–3–1			
Boston University:		4–3–1			
Williams Ephs (Independent) (1921–1924)
1921	Williams	5–2–1			
1922	Williams	2–6			
1923	Williams	7–1			
1924	Williams	7–1			
Williams:		21–10–1			
Lehigh Brown and White (Independent) (1925–1927)
1925	Lehigh	3–5–1			
1926	Lehigh	1–8			
1927	Lehigh	1–7–1			
Williams:		5–20–2			
Total:		30–33–4			
