= Hank Ketcham (American football) =

American football player (1891–1986)

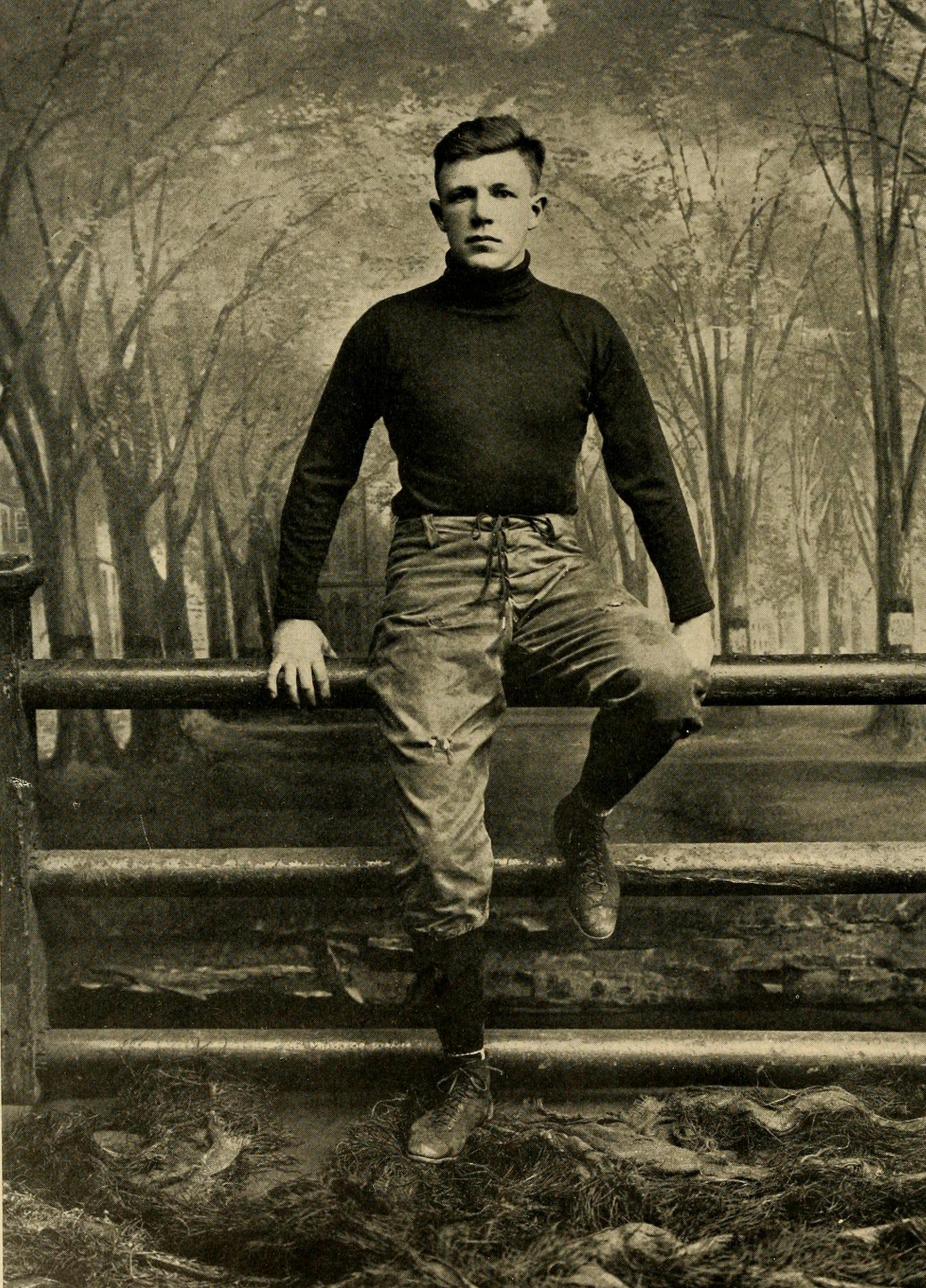
- Ketcham at Yale in 1913

Profile
- Positions: Center, guard
- Class: 1914

Personal information
- Born: June 17, 1891; Englewood, New Jersey, U.S.
- Died: November 1, 1986 (aged 95); Seattle, Washington, U.S.
- Listed height: 6 ft 0 in (1.83 m)
- Listed weight: 175 lb (79 kg)

Career information
- High school: Englewood (NJ); Hotchkiss School (CT)
- College: Yale (1911–1913)

Awards and highlights
- 2× Consensus All-American (1911, 1912); Second-team All-American (1913)
- College Football Hall of Fame (Class of 1968)

Henry Holman Ketcham (June 17, 1891 – November 1, 1986) was an American college football player who played at the center and guard positions for the Yale Bulldogs football team. Ketcham was a consensus All-America first-team selection in 1911 and 1912, and a second-team selection in 1913. He was inducted into the College Football Hall of Fame in 1968.

== Biography ==
Ketcham was born in Englewood, New Jersey, (Note: Ketcham's entry in his Yale class history gives his birth location as Highwood, which is an unincorporated community within Englewood.) and lived in Brooklyn, New York, and North Hatley, Quebec, during his youth. His father was a graduate of Yale and a lawyer. After attending the Hotchkiss School, Ketcham enrolled at Yale, where he was a member of Skull and Bones and the Psi Upsilon fraternity.

Ketcham played every game for Yale's varsity football team in 1911, 1912, and 1913. He helped lead Yale to a 7–2–1 record in 1911 and a 7–1–1 record in 1912 and was a consensus All-America Team selection for both of those seasons. In December 1912, Ketcham was selected as captain of the 1913 Yale football team. In a departure from past tradition at Yale, Ketcham subsequently appointed Howard Jones as the school's first salaried football coach.

Ketcham later recalled: "I played every varsity game for three years and was taken out only once for a slight injury … I am generally credited with having developed the term 'roving center'. (Note: Roving center is an outdated term for linebacker, coined during the era of the one-platoon system.) Except for today's platoon systems, football hasn't changed materially. We had the on-side kick, the ball was a bit larger in circumference and the drop kick was more popular than the place kick."

At the time he graduated from Yale, Ketchum expected to work in railroading, having worked during one summer for the Big Four Railroad.

Ketcham served in the United States Army as a lieutenant during World War I, from May 1917 to April 1919. He saw action as a member of the 103rd Field Artillery Regiment in the Battle of Saint-Mihiel and the Meuse–Argonne offensive, being slightly wounded in the latter.

Ketcham moved to Seattle and entered the lumber business, eventually owning a lumber wholesale business. In 1921, he married Katherine Eugenia Peters. Three of their sons went on to found the West Fraser Timber company.

In February 1968, Ketcham was selected as an inductee to the College Football Hall of Fame. He died in 1986, aged 95.
