= List of Mount Holyoke College people =

The following is a list of individuals associated with Mount Holyoke College through attending as a student, or serving as a member of the faculty or staff.

== Notable alumnae ==
=== Academics and scientists ===
- Clara Harrison Stranahan, 1849 – author; founder and trustee of Barnard College
- Harriet Newell Haskell, 1855 – educator and administrator
- Lucy Myers Wright Mitchell, 1864 – one of the first female classical archaeologists
- Cornelia Clapp, 1871 – zoologist and marine biologist
- Mary Cutler Fairchild, 1875 – pioneering librarian
- Alice Carter Cook, circa 1888 – botanist and later faculty, first female recipient of an American botany PhD
- Marian E. Hubbard, 1889 – zoology professor
- Alice Huntington Bushee, 1891 – Spanish literature professor at Wellesley College
- Martha Warren Beckwith, 1893 – anthropologist
- Abby Howe Turner, 1896 – founded Mount Holyoke's department of physiology
- Caroline Ransom Williams, 1896 – first female Egyptologist in North America
- Margaret Morse Nice, 1905 – ornithologist
- Alzada Comstock, 1910 – economics professor
- Mildred Sanderson, 1910 – mathematician
- Louise Freeland Jenkins, 1911 – astronomer
- Marion Elizabeth Blake, 1913 – classics professor
- Hazel E. Munsell, 1914 – chemist and researcher
- Helen G. Fisk, 1917 – vocational services educator
- Rachel Fuller Brown, 1920 – chemist who discovered Nystatin
- Mildred Trotter, 1920 – forensic anthropologist
- Elizabeth K. Worley, 1924 – zoologist, microbiologist
- Lucy Weston Pickett, 1925 – chemist
- Helen Sawyer Hogg, 1926 – astronomer
- Alice Standish Allen, 1929 – first female engineering geologist in North America
- Janet Wilder Dakin, 1933 – zoologist who was the youngest sister of Thornton Wilder and Charlotte Wilder
- Sara Anderson Immerwahr, 1935 – classical archaeologist
- Phoebe Stanton, 1937 – architectural historian, professor at Johns Hopkins University, and active in urban planning for the city of Baltimore.
- Virginia Griffing, 1940, physicist and chemist, first woman on the faculty of Catholic University of America's physics department
- Carolyn Shaw Bell, 1941 – economics professor
- Marie Mercury Roth, 1945 – synthetic organic chemist
- H. Catherine W. Skinner, 1952 – geologist and mineralogist
- Eva Moseley, 1953 – curator and archivist
- Mary McHenry, 1954 – professor of English credited with introducing African American literature to Mount Holyoke
- Margaret A. Dix, 1964 – British-Guatemalan botanist and taxonomist specializing in orchids
- Jane English, 1964 – physicist, translator, photographer
- Dolores Hayden, 1966 – professor of architecture, urbanism, and American studies
- Phyllis Young, 1966 – professor of Classical Studies
- Carolyn Collette, 1967 – professor of English
- Karen E. Rowe, 1967 – English professor at UCLA
- Susan Shirk, 1967 – professor of political science and former deputy assistant secretary of state for North Asia during the Clinton administration
- Lila M. Gierasch, 1970 – professor of chemistry, biochemistry and molecular biology
- Melissa McGrath, 1977 – astronomer; Chief Scientist at NASA Marshall Spaceflight Center
- Catherine Colello Walker, 2007 – planetary scientist at Woods Hole Oceanographic Institute

=== Activists ===
- Lucy Stone (attended 1839) – women's rights activist
- Olympia Brown (attended 1854–55) – women's rights activist
- Helen Pitts, 1859 – women's rights activist, second wife of Frederick Douglass, and founder of the Frederick Douglass Memorial and Historical Association
- Eliza Read Sunderland (graduated 1865) – writer, educator, lecturer, women's rights advocate
- Hortense Parker, 1883 – daughter of African American abolitionist, John Parker and the first African American student to graduate from Mount Holyoke College
- Alice Bradford Wiles, 1873 – Chicago clubwoman
- Elizabeth Holloway Marston, 1915 – the inspiration for Wonder Woman
- Ruth Muskrat Bronson, 1925 – poet, educator, Indian rights activist
- Sybil Bailey Stockdale, 1946 – founded the National League of Families of American Prisoners and MIAs in S.E. Asia; Lecturer; widow of '92 U.S. vice-presidential nominee, Adm. James Stockdale
- Nancy Skinner Nordhoff, 1954 – environmentalist and philanthropist; designated a Women's History Month Honoree by the National Women's History Project in 2006
- Gloria Johnson-Powell (Gloria Johnson), 1958 – child psychiatrist; important figure in the Civil Rights Movement and first African-American woman to attain tenure at Harvard Medical School
- Rose Dugdale – political activist and prominent member of the Provisional Irish Republican Army (IRA)
- Jody Cohen, 1976 – first female rabbi in Connecticut history; leader in the Women's Rabbinic Network and Union for Reform Judaism
- Lynn Pasquerella, 1980 – medical ethicist; president, Mount Holyoke College; president of the Association of American Colleges and Universities
- Louise C. Purington, 1864 – physician and temperance activist
- Mallika Dutt, 1983 – executive director of Breakthrough, an international human rights organization
- Kavita Ramdas, 1985 – president and CEO, Global Fund for Women
- Marcia Hofmann, 2000 – digital rights attorney and activist
- Mei Lum, 2012 – Chinese-American artist, activist, and entrepreneur

=== Actors, musicians, dancers and performers ===
- Elizabeth Eaton Converse – later known as Connie Converse, 1946 – singer and songwriter
- Caitlin Clarke (Katherine Clarke), 1974 – actress
- Michelle Hurst, 1974 – actress, known for her role as Miss Claudette on the Netflix series Orange Is the New Black
- Nancy Gustafson, 1978 – opera singer
- Melinda Mullins, 1979 – actress
- Zoë Lund (attended 1978–1979) – actress and writer
- Donna Kane, 1984 – actress
- Geneva Carr, 1988 – actress, Tony Award nominee, main cast member in CBS television series Bull
- Kimberly Hebert Gregory, 1994 – actress
- Zeb Bangash, 2004 – part of Pakistani music duo Zeb and Haniya
- Zoe Weizenbaum, 2014 – actress, known for her roles in Memoirs of a Geisha and 12 and Holding
- Sho Madjozi, 2015 – South African rapper
- Chmba, 2017 – Malawian DJ and social entrepreneur

=== Artists ===
- Esther Howland, 1847 – artist noted for her role in popularizing St. Valentine's Day cards
- Minerva J. Chapman, 1880 – painter
- Sarah A. Worden 1883–1891 – painter, art instructor
- Jane Hammond, 1972 – artist
- Susan Mohl Powers, 1966 – sculptor, painter
- Susan Jane Walp, 1970 – painter
- Maia Cruz Palileo, 2001 – artist
- Zehra Laila Javeri (year unknown) – artist

=== Athletes ===
- Stacy Apfelbaum – rowing cox; gold medal winner at the 1984 World Rowing Championships
- Margaret Hoffman, 1934 – swimmer who participated in both the 1928 Summer Olympics and 1932 Summer Olympics (200 m breaststroke)
- Imogene Opton Fish, 1955 – alpine skier who was captain of the U.S. women's 1952 Winter Olympics ski team
- Michele Drolet, 1976 – blind cross-country skier who was the first American woman to ever earn a Paralympic cross-country skiing medal – bronze at the 1994 Winter Paralympics
- Harriet (Holly) Metcalf, 1981 – executive director and founder of Row As One Institute who won a gold medal in rowing at the 1984 Summer Olympics
- Mary Mazzio, 1983 – filmmaker and Olympic athlete who participated in rowing at the 1992 Summer Olympics
- Olga Maria Sacasa, 1984 – cyclist; first woman to represent Nicaragua in cycling, at the 1992 Summer Olympics
- Katheryn Curi, 1996 – cyclist who placed first at the National Road Race Championships in Park City, Utah in June 2005

=== Businesswomen ===
- Elaine Greene – literary agent and founder of Elaine Greene Agency, later Greene & Heaton
- Maria J. Forbes (1853) – manager, Lunalilo Home
- Jean Picker Firstenberg, 1958 – director and CEO of the American Film Institute
- Mary Duffy, 1966 – feminist fashion expert, spokeswoman, entrepreneur, author, and motivational speaker, expanding concepts of beauty for the majority of women who do not fit ideal stereotypes popularized by fashion and media Big Beauties/Little Women, Ford Models
- Barbara J. Desoer, 1974 – CEO for Citibank N.A.; member of its board of directors
- Eileen Kraus, 1960 – trailblazing female banker and president of Connecticut National Bank
- Vicki Roberts, 1980 – attorney, on-air legal commentator, television and film personality
- Barbara Cassani, 1982 – first leader of London's successful bid for the 2012 Summer Olympics
- Sara Menker, 1982 – CEO, businesswoman, and food sustainability advocate
- Sheila Lirio Marcelo, 1993 – founder and CEO of Care.com

=== College presidents ===
- Susan Tolman Mills, 1845 – co-founder and first president of Mills College
- Ada Howard, 1853 – first president of Wellesley College
- Abbie Park Ferguson, 1856 – founder and president of Huguenot College
- Sarah Ann Dickey, 1869 – founder of Mount Hermon Female Seminary
- Florence M. Read, 1909 – former president, Spelman College
- Yau Tsit Law, 1916 – dean of women, Lingnan University
- Pauline Tompkins, 1941 – former president, Cedar Crest College
- Barbara M. White, 1941 – former president, Mills College
- Alice Stone Ilchman 1957 – former president, Sarah Lawrence College
- Elizabeth Topham Kennan, 1960 – former president, Mount Holyoke College
- Carol Geary Schneider, 1967 – president, Association of American Colleges and Universities
- Nancy J. Vickers, 1967 – president, Bryn Mawr College
- Elaine Tuttle Hansen, 1969 – president, Bates College
- Lynn Pasquerella, 1980 – president, Mount Holyoke College
- Vivian Blanche Small 1896, BA; 1912, Litt.D. – president, Lake Erie College
- Leocadia I. Zak, 2018 – president, Agnes Scott College
- Patricia Draves, 2024 – president, Monmouth College

=== Computer scientists and graphic designers ===
- Jean E. Sammet, 1948 – computer scientist who developed the FORMAC programming language
- Susan Kare, 1975 – original designer of many of the interface elements for the original Apple Macintosh.

=== Doctors, nurses and psychologists ===
- Nancy M. Hill, 1859 – Civil War nurse and one of the first female doctors in the U.S.
- Seraph Frissell, 1869 – physician, medical writer
- Mary Phylinda Dole, 1886, 1889 – became a doctor at a time when it was difficult for women to do so
- Dorothy Hansine Andersen, 1922 – doctor involved in cystic fibrosis research (first to identify the disease)
- Virginia Apgar, 1929 – doctor who developed the Apgar score for evaluating newborns; anesthesiologist
- Florence Wald 1938 – nurse, leader of the U.S. hospice movement
- Ellen P. Reese, 1948 – psychologist
- Abby Howe Turner – professor of physiology and zoology who founded the department of physiology at Mount Holyoke
- Gloria Johnson-Powell (Gloria Johnson), 1958 – child psychiatrist; an important figure in the Civil Rights Movement and the first African American woman to attain tenure at Harvard Medical School

=== Filmmakers, broadcast presidents, and producers ===
- Martha Atwell (attended, 1918–1919) – radio director
- Dulcy Singer, 1955 – former Emmy Award-winning producer of Sesame Street
- Julia Phillips (Julia Miller), 1965 – Hollywood producer and author
- Debra Martin Chase, 1977 – Hollywood producer
- Mary Mazzio, 1983 – filmmaker and Olympic athlete who participated in rowing at the 1992 Summer Olympics
- Sonali Gulati, 1996 – filmmaker and director of the film Nalini by Day, Nancy by Night
- Chloé Zhao, 2005 – Academy Award winner, director/filmmaker

=== Journalists ===
- Janet Huntington Brewster, 1933 – philanthropist, writer, and radio broadcaster; wife of Edward R. Murrow
- Beth Karas, 1979 – senior reporter, CourtTV
- Dari Alexander, c. 1991 – co-anchor of WNYW's weeknight 6 p.m. newscast, and previously a reporter and part-time anchor for the Fox News Channel

=== Judges ===
- Maryanne Trump Barry, 1958 – judge on the United States Court of Appeals for the Third Circuit; older sister of 45th president of the United States Donald Trump
- Janet Bond Arterton, 1966 – judge on the United States District Court for the District of Connecticut
- Janet C. Hall, 1970 – judge on the United States District Court for the District of Connecticut, chief judge of the District of Connecticut (2013–present)
- Glenda Hatchett, 1973 – judge on nationally syndicated television series, Judge Hatchett

=== Politics ===
- Louisa "Louise" Maria Torrey Taft, 1845 – mother of President William Howard Taft
- Frances Perkins, 1902 – first female cabinet member (U.S. secretary of labor 1933–1945 under President Franklin D. Roosevelt)
- Marion West Higgins, 1936 – first female Speaker of the New Jersey General Assembly
- Ella T. Grasso, 1940 – governor of Connecticut; the first female governor elected in her own right in United States history
- Jetta Jones, 1947 – lawyer in Chicago, served in Mayor Harold Washington's administration
- Joanne H. Alter, 1949 – activist and politician
- Nancy Kissinger (Nancy Maginnes), 1955 – philanthropist; wife of former U.S. Secretary of State Henry Kissinger
- Nita Lowey, 1959 – United States House of Representatives member (D-NY)
- Judith Kurland, 1967 – former regional director, United States Department of Health and Human Services
- Susan Shirk, 1967 – professor of political science and the former deputy assistant secretary of state for North Asia during the Clinton administration
- Jane Garvey (Jane Famiano), 1969 (M.A.T.) – former head of Federal Aviation Administration (FAA)
- Elaine Chao, 1975 – U.S. secretary of transportation, 2017–2021, U.S. secretary of labor, 2001–2009; director of the Peace Corps, 1991–1992; former national director, United Way
- Susan Longley, 1978 – state senator and judge of probate from Maine
- Karen Middleton, 1988 – legislator in the U.S. state of Colorado
- Mona Sutphen, 1989 – deputy White House chief of staff in the Obama administration
- Mahua Moitra, 1998 – member of Indian parliament, Lok Sabha
- Rabiya Javeri Agha, 1983 – a member of Pakistan Administrative Service, Pakistan Administrative Service
- Laura Loomer (transferred) – alt right conspiracy theorist

=== Writers ===
- Edna Dean Proctor, 1847 – poet
- Emily Dickinson (attended 1847–1848) – poet
- Emily Gilmore Alden, 1855 – author and educator
- Julia Harris May, 1856 – poet, teacher, school founder
- Mary Eleanor Wilkins Freeman (attended 1870–1871) – novelist and short story writer
- Louise Lamprey, 1891 – writer, children's literature
- Anne W. Armstrong (attended 1890–1892) – novelist
- Caroline Henderson, 1901 – Dust Bowl author
- Alice Geer Kelsey, 1918 – writer, children's literature
- Charlotte Wilder, 1919 – poet
- Kathryn Irene Glascock, 1922 – poet
- Constance McLaughlin Green, 1925 (master's degree) – historian who won the 1963 Pulitzer Prize for History for Washington, Village and Capital, 1800-1878
- Roberta Teale Swartz, 1925 – poet
- Virginia Hamilton Adair, 1933 – poet
- Martha Whitmore Hickman, 1947 – non-fiction author
- Nancy McKenzie, 1948 – Arthurian legend author
- Jean Rikhoff, 1948 – author
- Martha Henissart, 1950 – mystery author writing under the pen name of Emma Lathen with Mary Jane Latsis
- Nancy Bauer (Nancy Luke), 1956 – non-fiction author
- Elizabeth Topham Kennan, 1960 – author writing under the pen-name of Clare Munnings with Jill Ker Conway
- Nancy Bond, 1966 – writer, children's literature
- Olivia Mellan, 1968 – author of six books on money psychology
- Patricia Roth Schwartz, 1968 – poet
- Kathleen Eagle (Kathleen Pierson), 1970 – romance novelist
- Marisabina Russo, 1971 – writer, children's literature
- Wendy Wasserstein, 1971 – playwright who won the 1989 Tony Award for Best Play and the 1989 Pulitzer Prize for Drama for The Heidi Chronicles
- Lynne Barrett, 1972 – author
- Susan Shwartz, 1972 – science fiction and fantasy author
- Gjertrud Schnackenberg, 1975 – poet
- Kathleen Hirsch, 1975 – non-fiction author
- Judith Tarr, 1976 – science fiction and fantasy author
- Carol Higgins Clark, 1978 – mystery author
- Lan Cao, 1983 – novelist
- Suzan-Lori Parks, 1985 – playwright who won the 2002 Pulitzer Prize in Drama for Topdog/Underdog
- Liz Fenwick, 1985 – novelist
- Deborah Harkness, 1986 – author of the New York Times best selling novel A Discovery of Witches
- Sehba Sarwar, 1986 – novelist
- C. Leigh Purtill, 1988 – young adult author
- Sabina Murray, 1989 – screenwriter; wrote screenplay for The Beautiful Country
- Sherri Browning Erwin, 1990 – author of Thornbrook Park and Jane Slayre, member of Romance Writers of America
- Tahmima Anam, 1997 – author
- Susan J. Elliott, 2000 – non-fiction author
- Betsy James, writer
- Hanna Pylväinen, 2007 – author of We Sinners
- Katy Simpson Smith, ?2018 – novelist
- Hayeon Lim, 2017 – South Korean socialite and author

== Notable faculty, past and present ==
=== Artists ===
- Leonard DeLonga – professor of art
- William Churchill Hammond – organist, choirmaster, chairman of music department
- (Charles) Denoe Leedy – concert pianist and music journalist
- Harrison Potter – concert pianist and accompanist
- Henry Rox – professor of art
- David Sanford – professor of music
- Emmett Williams – artist in residence 1975–1976

=== Athletics ===
- Mary Ellen Clark – former head diving coach; diver who won two Olympic bronze medals at the 1992 Summer Olympics and the 1996 Summer Olympics

=== Authors, actors, poets, and playwrights ===
- Martha Ackmann – author and journalist
- Awam Amkpa – actor and playwright
- W.H. Auden – poet
- James Baldwin – Five Colleges faculty and novelist
- Sven Birkerts – author, The Gutenberg Elegies
- Joseph Brodsky – winner of the 1987 Nobel Prize in Literature, and Poet Laureate of the United States for 1991–1992
- Luis Cernuda – poet
- Anita Desai – novelist
- Anthony Giardina – novelist
- John Irving – author of The Cider House Rules and The World According to Garp
- Denis Johnston – playwright
- Brad Leithauser – author, poet
- Margaret Chai Maloney – author
- Jaime Manrique – author, poet
- Mary Olivia Nutting – librarian and historian
- Valerie Martin – novelist and short story writer
- Mary Jo Salter – poet and a coeditor of the Norton Anthology of Poetry
- Bapsi Sidhwa – novelist
- Paul Smyth – poet
- Ada L. F. Snell – poet
- Genevieve Taggard – poet
- Peter Viereck – 1949 Pulitzer Prize for Poetry for Terror and Decorum and professor of Russian History
- Richard Weber – Irish poet; visiting lecturer 1967–1970
- Douglas Whynott – author

=== Education ===
- Eunice Caldwell Cowles – assistant to Mary Lyon in the founding of Mount Holyoke Female Sminary
- Robert Hess (1938–1994) – president of Brooklyn College
- Mary Lyon – founder of Mount Holyoke Female Seminary in 1837 (later Mount Holyoke College)
- Vivian Blanche Small – president, Lake Erie College
- Beverly Daniel Tatum – president of Spelman College

=== Historians ===
- Michael Burns
- Joseph Ellis
- Robert Matteson Johnston
- Stephen F. Jones
- William S. McFeely
- Nellie Neilson
- Bertha Putnam
- Annah May Soule
- Peter Viereck

=== Humanities ===
- Christopher Benfey – professor of English
- Peter Berek – professor of English
- Marion Elizabeth Blake – classics professor
- Flora Bridges – taught Greek and English
- Gordon Keith Chalmers – professor of English
- Carolyn Collette – professor of English
- Emmanuel Chukwudi Eze – philosopher
- Leah Blatt Glasser – dean of first-year studies and lecturer in English
- Jeannette Augustus Marks – professor of English
- Mary McHenry – professor of English
- Indira Viswanathan Peterson – professor of Asian Studies
- William H. Quillian – professor of English
- Clara F. Stevens – professor of English, department head
- Ellen Bliss Talbot – professor of Philosophy and chair of the Department of Philosophy and Psychology for 32 years
- Jean Wahl – philosopher
- Donald Weber – professor of English
- Jon Western – professor of international relations
- Mary Gilmore Williams – professor of Greek

=== Journalists ===
- Todd Brewster – journalist, author, film producer, and current senior visiting lecturer in journalism

=== Politics ===
- Shirley Chisholm – U.S. representative, 1968–1983, founding member of the Congressional Black Caucus, and simultaneously the first woman and the first African-American to run for U.S. president
- Ellen Deborah Ellis – founder and first chair of the political science department at the college
- Jean Grossholtz – professor emeritus of politics; bodybuilder who won a silver medal at the 1994 Gay Games
- W. Anthony Lake – U.S. National Security Advisor, 1993–1997
- Christopher Pyle – professor of politics, journalist and whistleblower
- Margaret Rotundo – Maine State legislator
- Cyrus Vance – U.S. secretary of state, 1977–1980

=== Sciences and social sciences ===
- A. Elizabeth Adams – zoologist
- Katherine Aidala – physicist
- Mildred Allen – physicist
- Elisabeth Bardwell – astronomer
- Susan R. Barry – neurobiologist
- Grace Bates – mathematician
- John Bissell Carroll – psychologist
- Jill Bubier – environmental scientist
- Patty Brennan – evolutionary biologist
- Cornelia Clapp – zoologist and marine biologist
- Janet Wilder Dakin – zoologist, youngest sister of Thornton Wilder and Charlotte Wilder
- Ethel B. Dietrich – economist, foreign service officer
- Melinda Darby Dyar – planetary geologist, mineralogist, and spectroscopist
- Joanne Elliott – mathematician
- Alice Hall Farnsworth – astronomer, director of the John Payson Williston Observatory
- Anna Lockhart Flanigen – chemistry professor 1903–1910
- Dorothy Hahn – organic chemist
- Anna J. Harrison – organic chemist, first female president of the American Chemical Society
- Olive Hazlett – mathematician
- Amy Hewes – economist
- Karen Hollis – psychologist
- Janice Hudgings – physicist, former associate dean of faculty at Mount Holyoke College
- Elizabeth Laird – head of the physics department 1903–1940
- Flora Belle Ludington – librarian
- Emilie Martin – mathematician
- Mark McMenamin – paleontologist and geologist
- Ann Haven Morgan – zoologist
- Lucy Taxis Shoe Meritt, classical archaeologist and Greek scholar
- Kerstin Nordstrom – physicist
- Donal O'Shea – mathematician
- Harriet Pollatsek – mathematician
- Becky Wai-Ling Packard – educational psychologist
- Lucy Weston Pickett – chemist
- Ellen P. Reese – psychologist
- Margaret M. Robinson – mathematician
- Lydia Shattuck – botanist, founding member of the American Chemical Society
- Mignon Talbot – paleontologist who recovered and named the only fossils of the dinosaur Podokesaurus holyokensis
- Eleanor Townsley – Andrew W. Mellon professor of sociology
- Abby Howe Turner – founder of Mount Holyoke College's department of physiology
- Esther Boise Van Deman – archeologist
- Anne Sewell Young – astronomer, director of the John Payson Williston Observatory
- Antoni Zygmund – mathematician, co-founder of the Chicago school of mathematical analysis

=== Actors ===
- Michael Burns – Moondoggie in Gidget Gets Married, 1972

== Presidents ==
A number of individuals have acted as head of Mount Holyoke. Until 1888, the term "principal" was used. From 1888 to the present, the term "president" has been used.

No.	Image	President	Class	Term started	Term ended	Refs.
Principals of Mount Holyoke Female Seminary (1837–1888)
1		Mary Lyon (Note: Founder)	—	1837	March 5, 1849 (Note: died in office)	
2		Mary C. Whitman	1839	1849	1850	
acting		Mary W. Chapin	1843	1850	1852	
3		Mary W. Chapin	1843	1852	1865	
4 acting		Sophia D. Stoddard	1841	1865	1867	
5		Helen M. French	1857	1867	1872	
6		Julia E. Ward	1857	1872	1883	
7		Elizabeth Blanchard	1858	1883	1888	
acting		Elizabeth Blanchard	1858	1888	1889	
Presidents of Mount Holyoke Seminary and College (1888–1893)
elect		Mary A. Brigham	1849 (Note: non-graduate)	Died June 29, 1889 (Note: Brigham was unable to serve since she died before she was able to reach her new post.)		
8 acting		Louisa F. Cowles	1866	1889	1890	
Presidents of Mount Holyoke College (1893–present)
9		Elizabeth Storrs Mead	—	1890	1900	
10		Mary Emma Woolley	—	1900	1937	
11		Roswell G. Ham (Note: first male president)	—	1937	1957	
acting		Meribeth E. Cameron (Note: served as acting president for part of 1954 while President Ham was on leave)	—	1956	1956	
12		Richard Glenn Gettell	—	1957	1968	
acting		Meribeth E. Cameron (Note: served as acting president part of 1966 while President Gettell was on leave)	—	1966	1966	
13 acting		Meribeth E. Cameron	—	1968	1969	
14		David Truman	—	1969	June 30, 1978	
15		Elizabeth Topham Kennan	1960	July 1, 1978	June 30, 1995	
acting		Joseph Ellis (Note: served as acting president for part of 1984 while President Kennan was on leave)	—	1984	1984	
interim		Peter Berek (Note: served as interim president in fall 1995)	—	July 1, 1995	December 31, 1995	
16		Joanne V. Creighton	—	January 1, 1996	June 30, 2010	
acting		Beverly Daniel Tatum (Note: served as acting president for part of 2002 while President Creighton was on leave)	—	2002	2002	
17		Lynn Pasquerella	1980	July 1, 2010	June 30, 2016 (Note: resigned to lead the Association of American College & Universities)	
acting		Sonya Stephens	—	July 1, 2016	June 30, 2018	
18		Sonya Stephens	—	July 1, 2018	August 31, 2022 (Note: resigned to lead the American University in Paris)	
19 interim		Beverly Daniel Tatum	—	July 1, 2022	June 30, 2023	
20		Danielle Ren Holley	—	July 1, 2023	present	

Table notes:

== Commencement speakers ==
The following is a list of Mount Holyoke College commencement speakers by year.

- 2026: Beverly Guy-Sheftall, Asmi Shrestha ’26
- 2025: Maura Healey, Tehani Chandrasena Perera ’25
- 2024: Suchi Saria ’04, Mackenzie Windus '24
- 2023: Lan Cao '83, Nancy K. Welker '63, Imani Perry, Wilma Ambang Abam-DePass ’23
- 2022: Natalie Diaz, Katherine Butler Jones '57, Susannah Sirkin '76, Ocean Vuong
- 2021: Rabiya Javeri Agha '83, Yo-Yo Ma, Chloé Zhao '05, Casey Roepke '21
- 2020: (Note: Held in 2022 due to the coronavirus pandemic) Helen Drinan '69, Anita Hill, Lynn Pasquerella '80
- 2019: Adrienne Arsht '63, Barbara Smith '69, Gary Younge, Nada Taha Al-Thawr '19
- 2018: Nancy Pelosi, Aiza Amjad Malik '18
- 2017: Dolores Huerta, Anqa Khan '17
- 2016: Joia Mukherjee, Areeba Kamal ‘16
- 2015: Carol Geary Schneider ‘67, Olivia Papp ‘15
- 2014: Deborah Bial, Iman A. Abubaker '14
- 2013: Kavita N. Ramdas '85, Jenna M. Ruddock '13
- 2012: Azar Nafisi, Tamar S. Westphal '12
- 2011: Martha Nussbaum, Zehra Nabi '11
- 2010: Gail Collins, Sarah Elahi '10
- 2009: Mary McAleese, Caitlin M. Healey '09
- 2008: Carol Gilligan, Sally J. Brzozowski '08
- 2007: Wendy Kopp, Sara E. Richards '07
- 2006: Joyce Carol Oates, Margaret McDermott '06
- 2005: Nina Totenberg, Claudia Y. Calhoun '05
- 2004: Kim Campbell, Stacey R. Pulmano '04
- 2003: Judy Blume, Chiara D. Fuller '03
- 2002: Queen Noor of Jordan, Sara R. Curtin '02
- 2001: Suzan-Lori Parks '85, Lena K. Zuckerwise '01
- 2000: Mary Patterson McPherson, Elisabeth F. Snell '00
- 1999: Anna Quindlen, Caroline E. Green '99
- 1998: Johnnetta B. Cole, Meghan E. Freed '98
- 1997: Madeleine Albright, Chandra R.B.G. Dunn '97
- 1996: Donna Shalala, Devavani Chatterjea '96
- 1995: Ann Richards, Jennifer Lynch '95
- 1994: Nita Lowey '59, S. Rhae Parkes '94
- 1993: Judith Kurland '67
- 1992: Pat Schroeder
- 1991: Evelyn Fox Keller
- 1990: Wendy Wasserstein '71
- 1989: Glenn Close
- 1988: Joseph Brodsky
- 1987: Maya Angelou
- 1986: Xie Xide
- 1985: Nadine Gordimer, Gjertrud Schnackenberg ‘75
- 1984: Barbara B. Kennelly
- 1983: George Steiner
- 1982: Elizabeth Topham Kennan
- 1981: Shirley Chisholm
- 1980: John Irving
- 1979: Ellen Goodman '64
- 1978: David Bicknell Truman
- 1977: Ruth Ida Abrams
- 1976: Lillian Hellman
- 1975: Ella T. Grasso '40
- 1974: Beryl Robichaud Collins ‘40
- 1973: Matina Souretis Horner
- 1972: Barbara M. White
- 1971: David Bicknell Truman
- 1970: Ted Kennedy
- 1969: Kenneth Keniston
- 1968: David Riesman
- 1967: August Heckscher
- 1966: Philip Johnson
- 1965: James R. Killian, Jr.
- 1964: Lauris Norstad
- 1963: U Thant
- 1962: Abraham A. Ribicoff
- 1961: William O. Douglas
- 1960: Charles Malik
- 1959: Mildred McAfee Horton
- 1958: Norman Cousins
- 1957: Henry Steele Commager
- 1956: Edmund W. Sinnott
- 1955: Earl Warren
- 1954: Helen Rogers Reid
- 1953: Willard Thorp
- 1952: Frederick May Eliot
- 1951: Roswell G. Ham
- 1950: Frederick May Eliot
- 1949: Norman Makin
- 1948: Arnold Wolfers
- 1947: Katharine E. McBride
- 1946: Roswell G. Ham
- 1945: Robert F. Bradford
- 1944: Meta Glass
- 1943: Harold Beresford Butler
- 1942: Roswell G. Ham
- 1941: Christopher Morley
- 1940: Lillian M. Gilbreth
- 1939: Chauncey Brewster Tinker
- 1938: David Allan Robertson
- 1937: John Gilbert Winant
- 1936: William Allan Neilson
- 1935: William Ernest Hocking
- 1934: John Huston Finley
- 1933: Bruce Bliven
- 1932: George E. Vincent
- 1931: George W. Kirchwey
- 1930: James T. Shotwell
- 1929: Newton D. Baker
- 1928: Paul Shorey
- 1927: Frederick Carlos Ferry
- 1926: Frederick M. Davenport
- 1925: James Rowland Angell
- 1924: Henry Morgenthau, Kenneth C. M. Sills
- 1923: Alexander Meiklejohn
- 1922: Sergius A. Korff
- 1921: William Howard Taft
- 1920: Charles Zueblin
- 1919: Albert Parker Fitch
- 1918: George Edgar Vincent
- 1917: Henry Noble MacCracken
- 1916: Charles E. Jefferson
- 1915: William Ernest Hocking
- 1914: Charles S. Whitman
- 1913: Harry Emerson Fosdick
- 1912: Edward F. Sanderson, Charles R. Brown
- 1911: Henry Stiles Bradley
- 1910: Mary E. Woolley
- 1909: Hugh Black
- 1908: Rev. Henry A. Stimson
- 1907: Jane Addams
- 1906: Russell Briggs
- 1905: Judson Smith
- 1904: Talcott Williams
- 1903: Ira Remsen
- 1902: George Herbert Palmer
- 1901: James Hulme Canfield
- 1900: N. D. Hills
- 1899: William McKinley, Roger Wolcott, Judson Smith
- 1898: Charles M. Mead
- 1897: Charles Cuthbert Hall
- 1896: William Faunce
- 1895: A. J. Lyman
- 1894: Rev. Henry A. Stimson
- 1893: Chester David Hartranft
- 1892: Henry M. Storrs
- 1891: Elizabeth Storrs Mead, Merrill Gates
- 1890: Alexander McKenzie
- 1889: Luther Tracy Townsend
- 1888: N. G. Clark
- 1886: Henry L. Dawes
- 1884: J. H. Vincent
- 1883: Joseph L. Daryea
- 1882: William M. Taylor
- 1881: Albion W. Tourgee
- 1880: Samuel E. Herrick
- 1879: Theodore L. Cuyler
- 1878: William Seymour Tyler, Thomas P. Field
- 1877: Matthew Brown Riddle
- 1876: Alexander H. Bullock
- 1875: Julius H. Seelye
- 1874: Julius H. Seelye, Samuel Harris
- 1873: John M. Greene, William Seymour Tyler
- 1872: Harvey Denison Kitchel
- 1868: Edward N. Kirk
- 1867: George Nye Boardman
- 1864: Leonard Swain
- 1860: Roswell Dwight Hitchcock
- 1859: Austin Phelps
- 1856: Samuel W. Fisher
- 1853: Emerson Davis
- 1851: A. L. Stone
- 1850: William Chauncey Fowler
- 1849: Edward Hitchcock
- 1846: J. B. Condit
- 1845: Joel Hawes
- 1844: Edward N. Kirk
- 1842: Edward Hitchcock
- 1841: Bela Bates Edwards
- 1840: Mark Hopkins
- 1839: Rufus Anderson
- 1838: Joel Hawes
