= Inclusive excellence =

Inclusive excellence is a framework to advance diversity, equity, and inclusion (DEI). Used in organizational and educational contexts, this concept emphasizes the integration of diversity into the core missions and operational strategies of organizations.

== Overview ==
The term "Inclusive Excellence" was coined by Alma Clayton-Pederson, vice-president at the Association of American Colleges & Universities (AAC&U) in 2005. Moving beyond simple numeric diversity, it advocates for a more comprehensive approach that connects diversity with excellence. This framework influences not only policies like admissions and hiring but also everyday interactions, including those within academic honor societies, creating environments where a diverse array of individuals can thrive.

== Principles ==
Inclusive excellence revolves around key principles:

Access and Success: This involves ensuring equitable access to opportunities for all, including within honor societies, which historically have selective membership criteria that could benefit from more inclusive practices.

Climate and Intergroup Relations: Fostering a supportive and respectful environment is crucial in settings like honor societies, where diverse member interactions enhance the group's dynamism.

Education and Scholarship: Incorporating diverse perspectives into curricula and research, which honor societies can lead in their respective academic fields.

Institutional Infrastructure: Developing structures that support diversity and inclusion at every level, including in the governance of honor societies.

== Implementation ==
Organizations, including honor societies, implement inclusive excellence through:

Policy Development: Modifying policies to enhance equity, such as revising honor society membership criteria to be more inclusive.

Program and Curriculum Development: Designing programs that reflect and celebrate diversity, which honor societies can adopt to broaden their educational impact.

Outreach and Engagement: Ensuring a broad range of perspectives are included and valued, a key for honor societies seeking to enrich their membership's experience and representation.

Assessment and Evaluation: Continually assessing the effectiveness of DEI efforts, crucial for honor societies to remain relevant and impactful in a changing academic landscape.

== Impact ==
The application of inclusive excellence has proven to positively affect organizational performance and individual satisfaction by creating supportive and innovative environments. For honor societies, embracing these principles helps prepare members for success in a diverse world and ensures that these societies stay relevant and effective.

Inclusive excellence remains a dynamic and evolving approach to diversity and inclusion. As societies grow more diverse, the principles of inclusive excellence are increasingly important in shaping the future of institutions, including honor societies, driving them towards a more integrated and strategic effort to harness the benefits of diversity for organizational and educational success.

== See also ==
- Diversity, equity, and inclusion
- American Association of Colleges and Universities
- Honor society
