= Purtill =

Purtill is a surname. Notable people with the surname include:

- C. Leigh Purtill, American author
- Jim Purtill (born 1955), American football coach
- Joseph Purtill (1927–2014), American jurist, lawyer and legislator
- Kieron Purtill (born 1977), British rugby league player and coach
- Maurice Purtill (1916–1994), American swing jazz drummer
- Richard Purtill (1931–2016), American Philosophy professor and novelist
