= Katherine Aidala =

American physicist

Academic background
- Education: B.S., Applied Physics and Psychology, 2001, Yale University; M.A., Ph.D., Applied Physics, 2006, Harvard University
- Thesis: Imaging magnetic focusing in a two-dimension electron gas (2006)

Academic work
- Discipline: Physicists
- Sub-discipline: Condensed matter physics, materials science, atomic force microscopy
- Institutions: Mount Holyoke College

Katherine E. Aidala is an American physicist. She is a Fellow of the American Physical Society and a professor of physics at Mount Holyoke College in South Hadley, Massachusetts. She studies the fundamental properties of materials and devices, providing insight that could lead to technological innovation.

== Early life and education ==
Aidala obtained a B.S. in Applied Physics and Psychology from Yale University in 2001. At Yale, she was involved in the Rob Schoelkopf Lab, a quantum computing research lab with a focus on superconductors. She then received her M.A. in Applied Physics from Harvard University, followed by her Ph.D. in Applied Physics from Harvard in 2006. At Harvard, she was involved in building the He-3 cooled scanning probe microscope at the Robert Westervelt Group, eventually writing her dissertation based on her research with the group, titled "Imaging Magnetic Focusing in a Two-Dimensional Electron Gas."

== Career and research ==
Upon accepting a faculty position at Mount Holyoke College, Aidala received the Presidential Early Career Award for Scientists and Engineers, and an National Science Foundation CAREER award for her work in nanophysics. She was also named a Cottrell Scholar of 2009 by the Research Corporation for Scientific Advancement. In an effort to make science more approachable, Aidala started a bi-monthly SciTech Cafe and Organismic and Evolutionary Biology cafes in 2013 where local scientists could casually discuss their fields. Additionally, she established the Fimbel Maker & Innovation Lab to encourage women to enter STEM disciplines.

During her tenure at Mount Holyoke College, Aidala's research has focused on charge transport in nanocrystal quantum dots. She uses scanning probe microscopy to improve the efficiency of nanostructures and the devices that employ them.

In October 2020, Aidala was elected a Fellow of the American Physical Society "for her innovative development of scanning probe techniques to characterize soft materials, study disordered semiconductors, and apply azimuthal magnetic fields to magnetic nanostructured materials; for exceptional mentoring of undergraduate women in physics; and promoting public appreciation of science."

== Awards ==
- 2009 - Cottrell Scholar Award for Science Advancement from Research Corporation
- 2010 - National Science Foundation CAREER Award
- 2010 - Presidential Early Career Award for Scientists and Engineers
- 2015 - 40 under 40: Professors who Inspire
- 2016 - Meribeth E. Cameron Faculty Award for Scholarship
- 2020 - Prize for a Faculty Member for Research in an Undergraduate Institution, American Physical Society (APS)
- 2020 - Fellow of the American Physical Society
