= Marie Mercury Roth =

American chemist

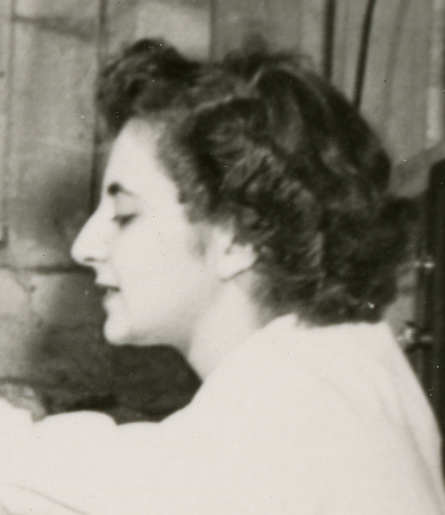
- Marie Mercury, circa 1947.
- Born: April 30, 1926; Boston, Massachusetts, USA
- Died: January 3, 2020 (aged 93); Wauwatosa, Wisconsin, USA
- Resting place: Mount Auburn Cemetery; Cambridge, Massachusetts, USA
- Education: B.A., 1945, chemistry, M.A., 1947, organic chemistry, Mount Holyoke College; Ph.D., 1951, chemistry, University of Wisconsin–Madison

Marie Mercury Roth (April 30, 1926 – January 3, 2020) was an American synthetic organic chemist. She was the first female Ph.D. candidate at the chemistry department of University of Wisconsin–Madison, where she worked with William Summer Johnson. She received her Doctorate of Philosophy in 1951 for the Application of the Favorskii rearrangement to the problem of angular methylation.

== Early life and education ==
Marie Louise Mercury was born in Boston, Massachusetts, on April 30, 1926, to Nicholas and Josephine (Borré) Mercurio. After graduating from Girls' Latin School, she attended Mount Holyoke College for her undergraduate studies. She graduated summa cum laude from Mount Holyoke in 1945 with a major in chemistry with minors in mathematics, physics and physiology. She was a member of Phi Beta Kappa and Sigma Xi. She then earned a master's degree in organic chemistry while working as a teaching assistant. Her professors included Anna J. Harrison, Mary Lura Sherrill, Emma Perry Carr, and Lucy Pickett.

== Education and career ==
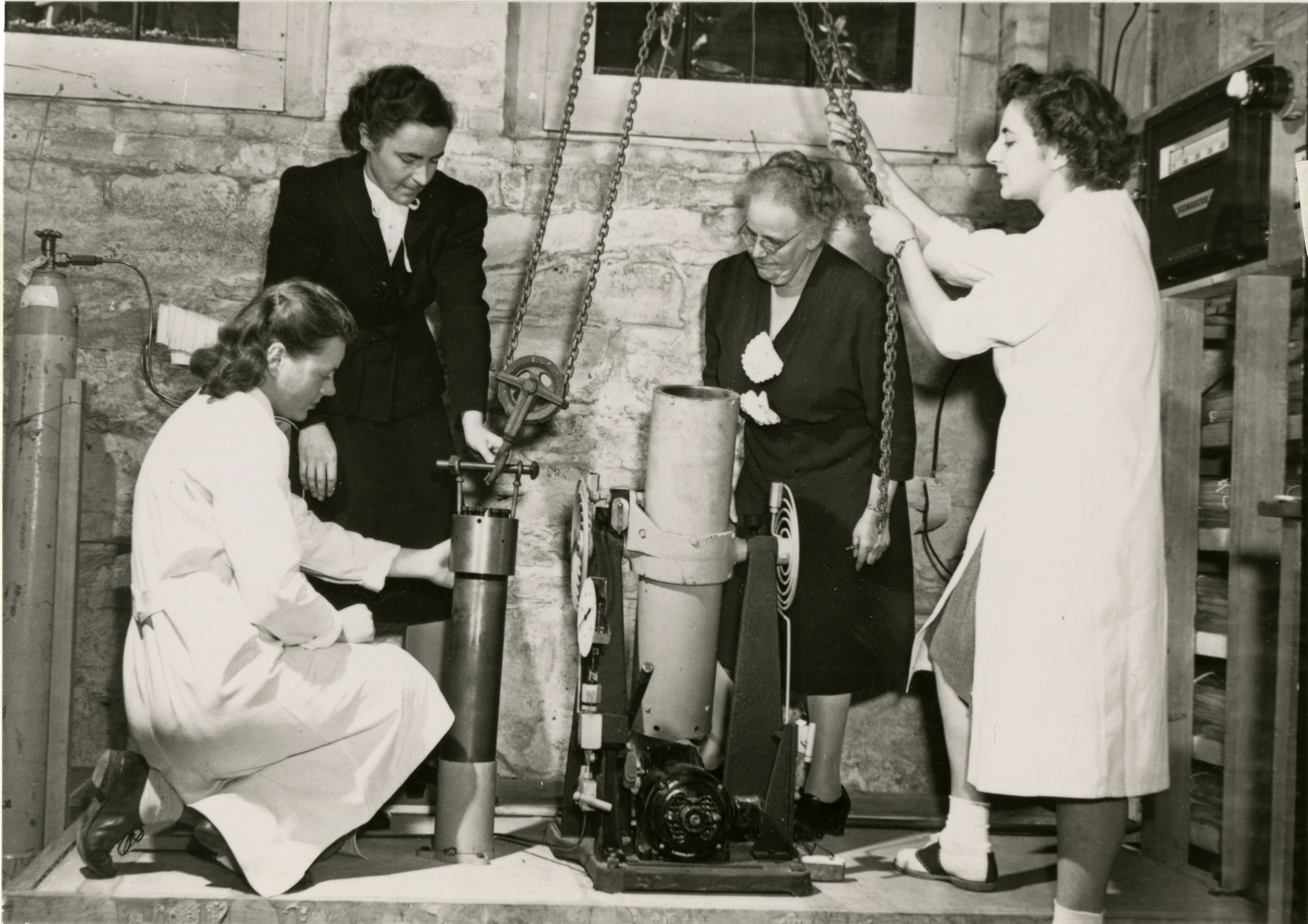
Kathleen Zier, Anna Jane Harrison, Mary Sherrill, Marie Mercury, c. 1947. Gift of Marie Mercury Roth, Science History Institute Collections

Although she was hired as a research chemist by Pittsburgh Paint, she was not allowed to work in laboratories once she became pregnant. Instead, she was reassigned to do library research work on emulsion polymerization. While her husband became a faculty member at the Medical College of Wisconsin, Marie Roth worked in private industry and taught undergraduate courses at various universities. She worked at the Medical College of Wisconsin in West Bend in the late 1970s.

In 1982, she was the editor of the Amalgamator, the bulletin of the Milwaukee section of the American Chemical Society. In 1985, she became chair of the Milwaukee section of the ACS.

== Family ==
Circa 1951, Marie Mercury married Donald A. Roth, who had obtained a Ph.D. from the same department in 1944. They had 4 children: Charles, Catherine, Joanne, and Nancy Ellen (born 1965). Joanne later pursued graduate studies in statistics at UW. Donald died in 2003. Charles died in 2016.
