= Elizabeth Storrs Mead =

American academic

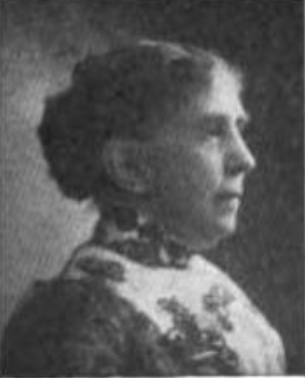

9th President of Mount Holyoke College
- In office 1890–1900
- Preceded by: Louisa F. Cowles
- Succeeded by: Mary Emma Woolley

Personal details
- Born: Elizabeth Billings; May 21, 1832 Conway, Massachusetts
- Died: March 25, 1917 (aged 84) Miami, Florida
- Resting place: Andover, Massachusetts
- Education: Ipswich Female Seminary
- Profession: Professor

Elizabeth Storrs Mead (née Billings; May 21, 1832 – March 25, 1917) was an American educator who was the 9th President of Mount Holyoke College from 1890 - 1900. She taught at Andover Seminary and Oberlin College, before becoming the first non-alumna president of Mount Holyoke.

== Biography ==
Elizabeth Storrs was born in 1832 in Conway, Massachusetts. She was educated in the common schools and at the Ipswich Female Seminary in Ipswich, Massachusetts. She received the degrees of M.A. from Oberlin College and L.H.D. from Smith College.

For one year, she taught in the high school of Northampton, Massachusetts. For six years, she conducted a family school with a sister of Andover, Massachusetts. For two years she taught in Oberlin College; and for six years taught at Abbott Seminary of Andover. In 1890–1900, she was president of Mount Holyoke college.

She married Reverend Hiram Mead. They were the parents of social psychologist George Herbert Mead.

She died in Coconut Grove, Miami, Florida on March 25, 1917.

== See also ==
- Presidents of Mount Holyoke College
