= Lynn Pasquerella =

American academic

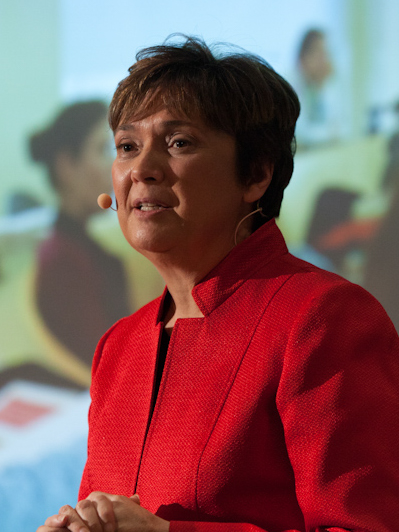
- Pasquerella speaking at TEDxPioneerValley on January 21, 2012

14th President of American Association of Colleges and Universities
- In office 2016–Present
- Preceded by: Carol Geary Schneider

18th President of Mount Holyoke College
- In office 2010–2016
- Preceded by: Joanne V. Creighton
- Succeeded by: Sonya Stephens

Personal details
- Born: December 8, 1958 (age 67)
- Spouse: John Kuchle (m. 1980)
- Children: 2
- Education: Quinebaug Valley Community College (transferred, 1978); Mount Holyoke College (B.A., 1980); Brown University (Ph.D., 1985)
- Profession: Professor

Lynn C. Pasquerella is an American academic and the 14th president of the American Association of Colleges and Universities. Before she assumed this position, she was the 18th president of Mount Holyoke College in South Hadley, Massachusetts, serving from 2010 to 2016. She was a professor of philosophy at the University of Rhode Island for 22 years before becoming URI's Associate Dean of the Graduate School. From 2006 to 2008 she was Vice Provost for Academic Affairs and Dean of the Graduate School at the University of Rhode Island. She was the Provost of the University of Hartford from 2008 to 2010. She also served as the President of Phi Beta Kappa society from 2018 to 2021.

== Education ==
Pasquerella is a 1979 summa cum laude graduate of Quinebaug Community College, a 1980 Phi Beta Kappa and magna cum laude graduate of Mount Holyoke College, and earned her Ph.D. in Philosophy in 1985 from Brown University.

== Career ==
Pasquerella is a philosopher whose area of interest is medical ethics. She was a fellow in the John Hazen White Sr. Center for Ethics and Public Service and a professor of medical ethics in Alpert Medical School’s Affinity Group Program.

Pasquerella has received funding through the United States Department of Energy to work on ethical issues related to the Human Genome Project. She has also received research grants from the National Endowment for the Humanities, the National Science Foundation, the William and Flora Hewlett Foundation, the American Bar Association, the Council of Graduate Schools, and the United States Office of Research Integrity. She was the principal investigator on a $3.5 million NSF ADVANCE grant to promote the careers of women in the science, technology, engineering and mathematics (STEM) disciplines and on a $750,000 NSF–Northeast Alliance for Graduate Education and the Professoriate grant to encourage recruitment of underrepresented groups into the professoriate in STEM fields.

Pasquerella has served on the boards of Paul Newman's Discovery Center and the Africa Center for Engineering Social Solutions, for which she has also been a project leader in Kenya. She has served on the board of directors of the Rectory School, Day Kimball Hospital’s ethics committee and as chair of its Institutional Review Board, the Rhode Island Bio Bank Steering Committee, the Rhode Island Health Department’s Institutional Review Board, and the advisory board for the Women’s Adult Correctional Facility in Rhode Island.

Since July 2010, Pasquerella has hosted The Academic Minute, a radio segment and podcast featuring a different university-based researcher each day. The Academic Minute is produced by Northeast Public Radio in partnership with the American Association of Colleges and Universities. In addition to Northeast Public Radio, The Academic Minute, which airs on WAMC, is syndicated to other stations throughout North America and streamed internationally via the web.

On January 4, 2016, Pasquerella announced that she would be stepping down as president of Mount Holyoke College at the end of the 2016 academic year. Pasquerella became the 14th president of the American Association of Colleges and Universities starting July 1, 2016. From 2018 to 2021, Pasquerella served as the president of the Phi Beta Kappa Society. She serves on the boards of several institutions and organizations, including the Lingnan Foundation Board of Trustees, the Heterodox Academy Advisory Council, the Olin College of Engineering Board of Trustees, and the national Trust for the Humanities. She is also a member of the editorial advisory boards of several academic publications, including the Journal of Public Integrity, LearningWell Magazine, the Journal of Brentano and the Aristotelian Tradition, and Public Philosophy Journal.

== Awards and recognition ==
In December 2022, Pasquerella was awarded the North Star Medal of Lifetime Achievement by the STAR Scholars Network. In October 2022, she received the Brown University Alumni Association’s William Rogers Award, and in May 2020, she received the Mount Holyoke College Alumni Association’s Elizabeth Topham Kennan Award. In May 2019, Pasquerella was named one of America’s Top 35 Women in Higher Education by Diverse: Issues in Higher Education.

Pasquerella has received the 2018 Algernon Sydney Sullivan Award for Distinguished Humanitarian Service and Altruism from Mary Baldwin College. On May 20, 2017, Pasquerella was the commencement speaker for Elizabethtown College's Class of 2017. On June 3, 2017, she received an honorary doctorate in Civil Law from Bishop's University in Quebec, Canada. Pasquerella delivered a commencement address and received an honorary doctorate degree at the University of Hartford’s graduate commencement ceremony on May 18, 2019. She also received honorary doctorate degrees during the commencement ceremonies of the University of South Florida on May 2, 2019, and the University of Rhode Island on May 19. She received honorary doctorates from Mount Holyoke College in 2020, from Concordia College in 2021, and from Bay Path University in 2022.

== Publications ==
- What We Value: Public Health, Social Justice, and Educating for Democracy, University of Virginia Press, January, 2022.
- Ethical Issues in Home Health Care. Co–authored with Rosalind Ladd and Sheri Smith. Charles C. Thomas Publishing, 2002.
- Ethical Dilemmas in Public Administration. Edited with Alfred Killilea and Michael Vocino. Praeger, 1996.
- "Brentano’s Theory of Value: Beauty, Goodness, and the Concept of Correct Emotions" with Wilhelm Baumgartner in The Cambridge Companion to Brentano, 2004. Pages 220–237.
