= Roswell G. Ham =

American academic

11th President of Mount Holyoke College
- In office 1937–1957
- Preceded by: Mary Emma Woolley
- Succeeded by: Richard Glenn Gettell

Personal details
- Born: March 11, 1891 Lemoore, California
- Died: July 20, 1983 (aged 92) Santa Barbara, California
- Education: University of California, Berkeley; Yale University
- Profession: Professor

Roswell Gray Ham (March 11, 1891 – July 20, 1983) was an American educator who served as the 11th President of Mount Holyoke College from 1937 to 1957. He was born in LeMoore, California and received his B.A. from University of California, Berkeley and his Ph.D. from Yale University. He taught at Yale for ten years before becoming the first male president of Mount Holyoke.

== See also ==
- Presidents of Mount Holyoke College

Academic offices
Preceded by Mary Emma Woolley	President of Mount Holyoke College; 1937–1957	Succeeded by Richard Glenn Gettell
