= Raymond G. Gettell =

American football coach

Raymond Gettell
Biographical details
- Born: March 4, 1881; Shippensburg, Pennsylvania, U.S.
- Died: October 9, 1949 (aged 68); Berkeley, California, U.S.
- Education: Ursinus (1904)

Coaching career (HC unless noted)
- 1908–1913: Trinity (CT)
- 1917–1920: Amherst

Head coaching record
- Overall: 51–20–6

Accomplishments and honors

Championships
- 2 Little Three (1919–1920)

Raymond Garfield Gettell (March 4, 1881 – October 9, 1949) was an American football coach and political science professor. He served as the head football coach at Trinity College in Hartford, Connecticut from 1908 to 1913 and at Amherst College from 1917 to 1920, compiling a career college football coaching record of 51–20–6; he also served as professor of political science from 1914 to 1923. His wife, Nelene Groff Gettell (née Knapp), taught at Amherst High School from 1921 to 1923; the 1923 Yearbook was dedicated to her. The Gettells moved to Berkeley, California in 1923 so that Gettell could assume the head of the political science department at the University of California, which he held until his death.

Raymond and Nelene Gettell were the parents of economist and college administrator Richard Glenn Gettell.

== Head coaching record ==
Year	Team	Overall	Conference	Standing	Bowl/playoffs
Trinity Bantams (Independent) (1908–1913)
1908	Trinity	4–3–1			
1909	Trinity	6–1–2			
1910	Trinity	7–1			
1911	Trinity	6–0–2			
1912	Trinity	6–3			
1913	Trinity	5–2–1			
Trinity:		34–10–6			
Amherst (Little Three) (1917–1920)
1917	Amherst	4–3	1–1	2nd	
1918	Amherst	2–2	1–1	2nd	
1919	Amherst	6–2	1–1	T–1st	
1920	Amherst	5–3	1–1	T–1st	
Amherst:		17–10	4–4		
Total:		51–20–6			
National championship Conference title Conference division title or championship game berth
