= Richard Glenn Gettell =

American academic

12th President of Mount Holyoke College
- In office 1957–1968
- Preceded by: Roswell G. Ham
- Succeeded by: Meribeth E. Cameron

Personal details
- Born: March 3, 1912 Hartford, Connecticut
- Died: August 14, 1988 (aged 76) Menlo Park, California
- Education: Amherst College; University of California, Berkeley
- Profession: Professor

Richard Glenn Gettell (March 3, 1912 – August 14, 1988) was an American educator who served as the 12th President of Mount Holyoke College from 1957 to 1968.

His mother, Nelene Groff Gettell (née Knapp), taught at Amherst High School from 1921 to 1923; the 1923 Yearbook was dedicated to her. His father was college football coach and political scientist Raymond G. Gettell. The family moved to Berkeley, California in 1923 after Raymond was appointed head of the political science department at the University of California, which he held until his death.

Gettell served in the Merchant Marines, then attended Deerfield Academy. He received his B.A. from Amherst in 1933, where he was president of its Alpha Delta Phi chapter, and his Ph.D. from the University of California in 1940. Before his appointment to Mount Holyoke, Gettell taught at Harvard University, Wellesley College, Yale University, and Columbia University.

== See also ==
- Presidents of Mount Holyoke College
