= Mary Emma Woolley =

10th President of Mount Holyoke College from 1900 to 1937

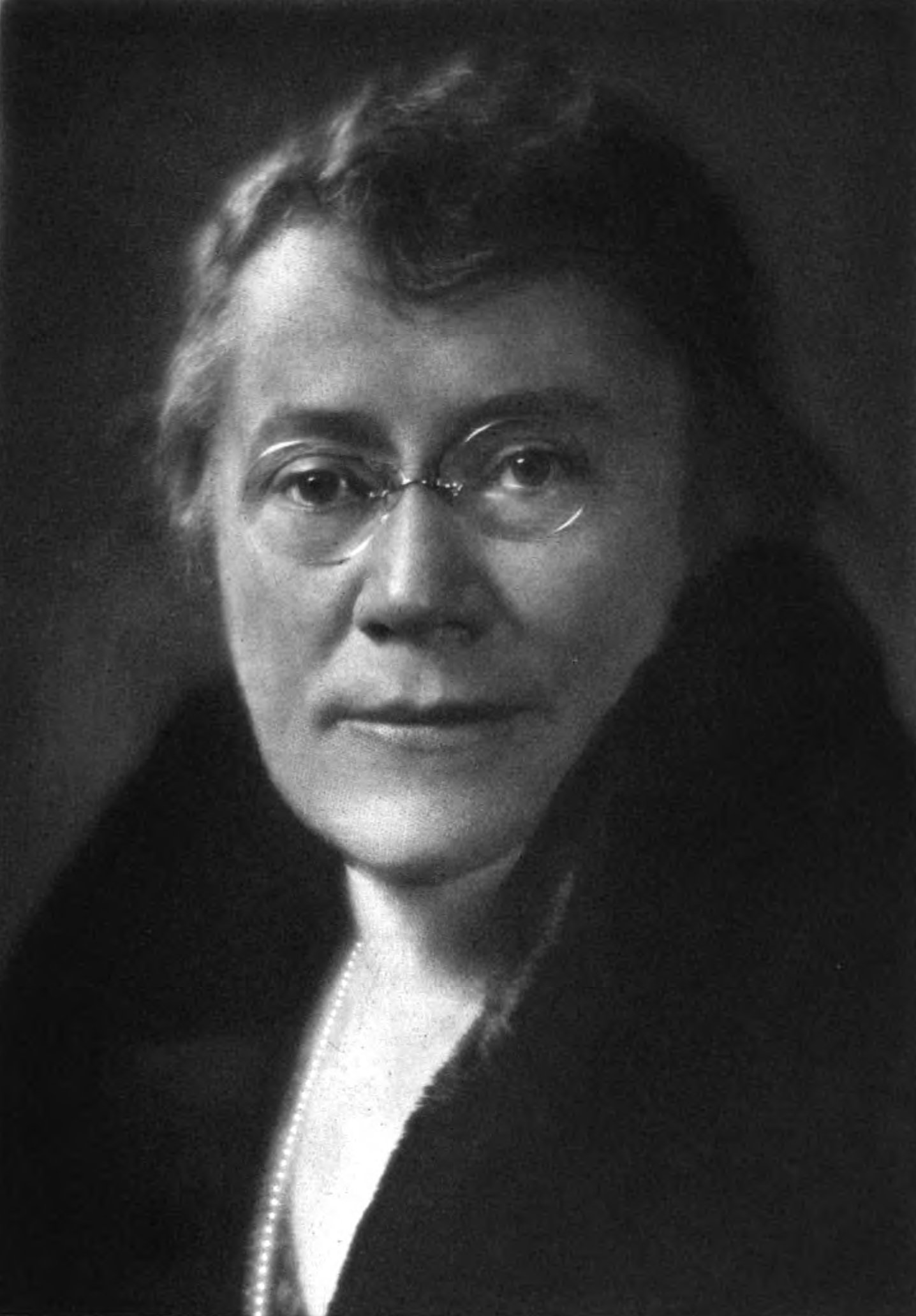

10th President of Mount Holyoke College
- In office 1900–1937
- Preceded by: Elizabeth Storrs Mead
- Succeeded by: Roswell G. Ham

Personal details
- Born: July 13, 1863 South Norwalk, Connecticut
- Died: September 5, 1947 (aged 84)
- Domestic partner: Jeannette Augustus Marks
- Education: Brown University
- Profession: Professor

Mary Emma Woolley (July 13, 1863 – September 5, 1947) was an American educator, peace activist and women's suffrage supporter. She was the first female student to attend Brown University and served as the 10th President of Mount Holyoke College from 1900 to 1937.

== Early life and education ==
Woolley was the daughter of Joseph Judah (J.J.) Woolley and his second wife, Mary Augusta Ferris. She was given the nickname May, and enjoyed a comfortable, nurturing childhood in New England. She was first raised in Meriden, Connecticut and, starting in 1871, Pawtucket, Rhode Island. Her father was a Congregational minister and his efforts to incorporate social work into religion, heavily influenced his daughter.

Woolley attended Providence High School and a number of smaller schools run by women before finishing her secondary schooling, in 1884, at the Wheaton Seminary in Norton, Massachusetts. Woolley returned to teach there from 1885 to 1891. After traveling through Europe for two months during the summer of 1890, she intended to attend Oxford University, but her father agreed with Elisha Benjamin Andrews, the president of Brown University, that Woolley should become one of the first female students at Brown. She began attending Brown in the fall of 1890, while still teaching at Wheaton. In 1894, she received her B.A. and in 1895, her M.A. for her thesis titled, The Early History of the Colonial Post Office.

== Teaching career ==
In 1895, Woolley began teaching biblical history and literature at Wellesley College. She was popular among her students and peers and, in 1896, she was made an associate professor. By 1899, she had been promoted to full professor. During her time at Wellesley, she made significant changes in the curriculum while gaining administrative experiences as the chair of her department. She also met Jeannette Augustus Marks, a student at Wellesley. Beginning in 1900, the two women lived in a life partnership for 47 years.

In December 1899, Brown offered Woolley a job as the head of the newly founded Women's College. Simultaneously, Mount Holyoke College offered her its presidency. Woolley took Mount Holyoke's offer and on January 1, 1901, at the age of 38, became one of the youngest college presidents in the United States.

Also in 1900, she became the first woman to receive an honorary degree from Amherst College.

== Mount Holyoke Presidency ==
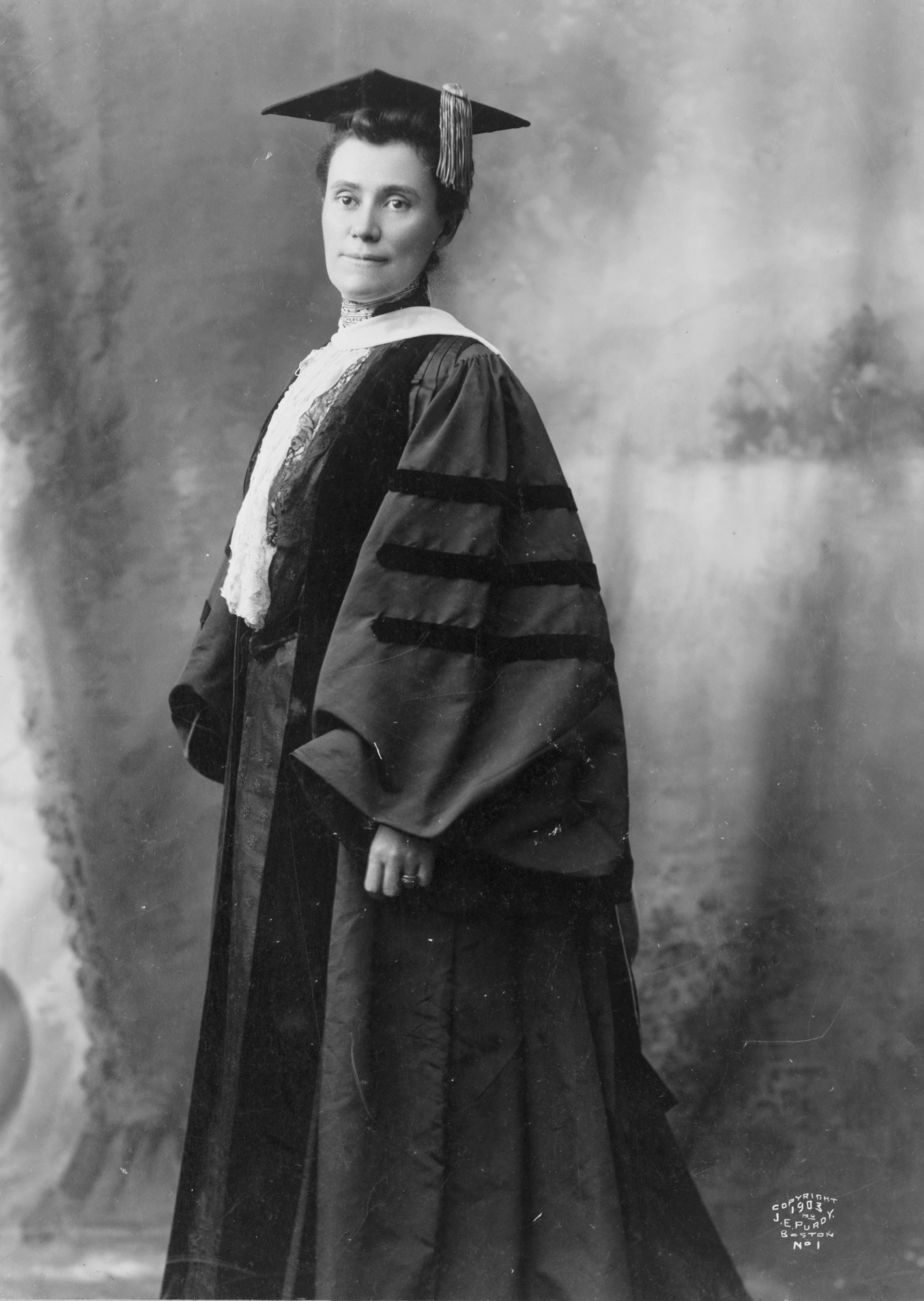
Woolley in 1903

Immediately upon arrival at Mount Holyoke, Woolley outlined her views on female education. While in the past, the college had placed an emphasis on women's education in service to society, Woolley stressed that in the future, a women's education would not need to be justified by anything but intellectual grounds. Woolley believed education was a preparation for life, and that an educated woman was able to achieve anything. She argued that if women had not succeeded in the past, it was because their education, or lack thereof, had held them back.

As the president of a women's college, one of her many responsibilities was to publicly support female education. During her 36-year presidency, she worked to end the prejudice of the era that contended that women had a natural learning disability and that intellectual work negatively affected their health. Woolley began to have influence within the academic community, and she led cooperative efforts with other women's colleges to raise funds, academic standards and public consciousness for women's education. During Woolley's presidency, she built a strong faculty, attracting scholars from the most prestigious graduate schools by offering increased salaries, fellowships, and sabbaticals.

Woolley also attempted to improve the quality of students admitted to Mount Holyoke, after raising admission standards, introducing honors programs and general examinations for seniors. The college endowment also grew from $500,000 to nearly $5 million and the campus added sixteen new building during her 36-year presidency. One of her most significant changes came when she abolished the domestic work system, instituted by the college's founder, Mary Lyon. When Lyon founded the college in 1837, students were required to cook and clean for economic reasons, and other women's colleges followed the example. By 1901, Mount Holyoke was the only women's college with the system still in place and Woolley thought the system was old fashioned and an obstacle in her goal of making Mount Holyoke intellectually equal to male colleges.

She also created a position for Jeanette Marks, who taught English and Theater at Mount Holyoke until her retirement in 1941. Though the women never publicly acknowledged a lesbian relationship, there were some undercurrents of resentment at the college for Woolley's alleged "favoritism" towards Marks.

== Organizational activity ==
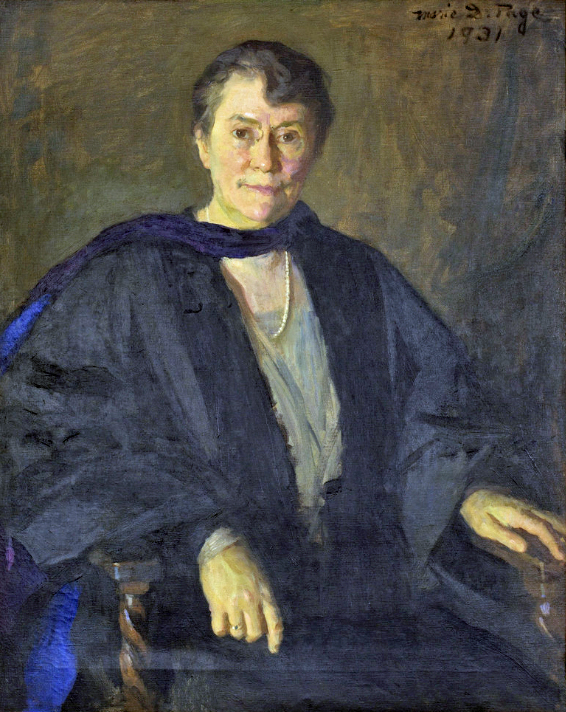
Portrait by Marie Danforth Page (1931)

Woolley also managed to devote her time to a number of organizations during her presidency, advocating for social reform of all kinds, including suffrage, pacifism and church matters. She served as the vice president of the American Civil Liberties Union (ACLU) and also worked on U.S. entry into the League of Nations. She also worked with President Herbert Hoover on women's rights and with President Franklin D. Roosevelt on pacifism. She was an early member of the Association of Collegiate Alumnae which later became the American Association of University Women. From 1927-1933, she served as President of AAUW. She gained international recognition after President Hoover appointed her as a delegate to the Conference on Reduction and Limitation of Armaments, which met in Geneva, Switzerland, in 1932.

She was on the board of electors of the Hall of Fame, the national board of the Y.W.C.A., the executive committee of the American School Peace League, the council of the National Institute for Moral Instruction, the Commission on Peace and Arbitration. She was a senator of the United Chapters of Phi Beta Kappa and honorary vice president of the National Consumers' League.

In 1909, Woolley was one of 60 signers of the "Call for the Lincoln Emancipation Conference to Discuss Means for Securing Political and Civil Equality for the Negro", a document that created the National Association for the Advancement of Colored People.

== Later years ==
Beginning in 1933, an effort began to gather steam among some male members of the Board of Trustees to make sure that when Woolley retired, she would be replaced by a male president. Many of the Board members who supported this approach believed that Mount Holyoke College had become "overfeminized" with most of the departments headed by women and male faculty in a small minority. Some looked to Mount Holyoke as a place where graduates of Yale University might find jobs and felt that hiring a male president would make that more likely.

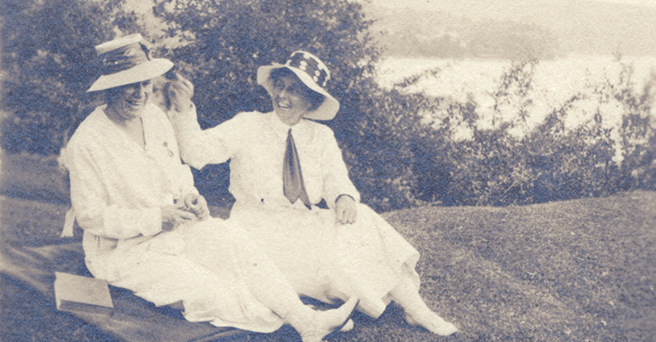
Woolley and Jeannette Augustus Marks

Woolley retired in 1937 at the age of 74. The appointment of Roswell Gray Ham to succeed her was a blow to opportunities for women to advance through higher education. She, members of the faculty, members of the AAUW and members of the alumnae group fought back strenuously. The vote at the June 6, 1936 Board meeting just achieved the required majority despite eloquent pleas from trustee Frances Perkins (a Mount Holyoke alumna and Secretary of Labor), Woolley and members of the faculty. After Ham was appointed, some alumnae attempted to rouse sufficient opposition to convince Ham to refuse the appointment but official Mount Holyoke closed ranks and the opposition was defeated. Woolley and her allies did have the "last word" at the college's centennial celebration in May 1937 (a month before Ham took office). He was not invited to attend and many of the speeches decried the actions of the Board of Trustees. After her retirement, Woolley never visited the Mount Holyoke campus again. She moved to the Marks family home in Westport, NY and lived there with Marks until her death in 1947.

Woolley remained an active social advocate during her retirement, and she spent much of her time lecturing at meetings and conferences. On September 30, 1944, in her Westport, New York home, she suffered from a cerebral hemorrhage which partially paralyzed her. She spent the final three years of her life in a wheelchair and Marks cared for her until her death in 1947.

== In popular culture ==
Woolley was the subject of a play, Bull in a China Shop, written by Mount Holyoke alumna Bryna Turner. The show premiered at the Lincoln Center on March 1, 2017.

== Works ==
In addition to her master's thesis, she wrote Development of the Love of Romantic Scenery in America and many educational articles.

== See also ==
- Presidents of Mount Holyoke College
