= Ellen P. Reese =

American psychologist

- Born: August 30, 1926
- Died: April 2, 1997 (aged 70)
- Occupation: Professor

Academic work
- Discipline: Psychology
- Institutions: Mount Holyoke College

Ellen P. Reese (August 30, 1926 – April 2, 1997) was the Norma Cutts Dafoe professor of psychology at Mount Holyoke College until 1994.

She received her B.A. in psychology from Mount Holyoke in 1948 and her M.A. in 1954. The Ellen P. Reese Grants for Faculty/Student Research has been established in her name. In 1997 Mount Holyoke held a conference dedicated entirely to her memory.

== Awards ==
Reese was honored in 1986 by the American Psychological Association (APA) with the Distinguished Contribution to Education in Psychology Award. In 1992, the APA included her in a list of the 100 most important women in psychology.
