= Alice Huntington Bushee =

American teacher (1867–1956)

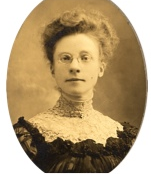
- Born: December 4, 1867; Worcester, Massachusetts
- Died: April 28, 1956 (aged 88); Woonsocket, Rhode Island

Academic background
- Education: Mount Holyoke College
- Alma mater: Boston University

Academic work
- Discipline: Hispanic studies
- Institutions: Wellesley College
- Notable works: Fundamentals of Spanish Grammar

Alice Huntington Bushee (December 4, 1867 – April 28, 1956) was an American librarian and early pioneer in Hispanic studies. She was a professor at Wellesley College and wrote several books, including Fundamentals of Spanish Grammar.

== Early years and education ==
Bushee was born on December 4, 1867, in Worcester, Massachusetts. She grew up in Morrisville, Vermont. Bushee graduated from the Peoples Academy in 1886. In 1891, she graduated from Mount Holyoke College. She was the class valedictorian.

== Career ==
After graduation, Bushee taught in schools in the United States.

In 1893, she traveled to Europe to be a missionary where she was slated to work in San Sebastian. In San Sebastian, she worked as a librarian, math teacher and Spanish literature teacher at the International Institute for Girls in Spain (IIGS). In 1904, she organized the IIGS. When her father died in 1907, Bushee returned to the United States.

Bushee graduated with a master's degree in Spanish from Boston University in 1909. She became a Spanish teacher at Wellesley College in 1911. Bushee published Fundamentals of Spanish Grammar in 1917 which was praised by Hispania as "nothing quite like it in modern language grammars published in this country." The grammar book used a deductive method of language instruction. In 1931, she became the Helen J. Sanborn Chair of Spanish literature at Wellesley. Other accomplishments include recovering a "lost" volume of the book, The Sucesos of Mateo Alemán, which helped fill in missing history about Mateo Alemán's life in Mexico. Hispanic Review called Bushee an early pioneer in Hispanic studies in the United States. She published Three Centuries of Tirso de Molina in 1939 about theater of writer, Tirso de Molina. She later published a study about de Molina called La prudencia en la mujer in 1948.

In 1936, Bushee retired to live with her family in Rhode Island. Bushee died on April 28, 1956, in Woonsocket in the hospital after an illness.
