= Becky Wai-Ling Packard =

American psychologist

- Awards: Presidential Early Career Award for Scientists and Engineers

Academic background
- Education: University of Michigan
- Alma mater: Michigan State University

Academic work
- Discipline: Psychology
- Institutions: Mount Holyoke College

Becky Wai-Ling Packard is Professor of Psychology and Education, and former Director of the Weissman Center for Leadership, Associate Dean of Faculty, and Founding Director of Teaching and Learning at Mount Holyoke College.

She received her B.A. from the University of Michigan and her Ph.D. from Michigan State University. She is the winner of the Presidential Early Career Award for Scientists and Engineers (PECASE), the highest honor awarded to young scientists in the country. In 2023, she was named a fellow of the American Association for the Advancement of Science.
