= Paul Smyth (poet) =

American poet

Paul Smyth (31 January 1944 – 17 December 2006) was an American poet, writer, and teacher.

== Background ==
Paul Smyth was born in Boston and raised in Holliston, Massachusetts. At the age of sixteen, he left home to hitchhike across the North America. During this time, he spent time in Mexico, the San Francisco Bay Area, and Provincetown. It was in Massachusetts that he got his first writing job as a freelancer for the New Beacon Newspaper.

He studied in Harvard University's extension program with poet Theodore Morrison. He received his B.A. in 1968.

Smyth was married three times, the third time to the poet Gjertrud Schnackenberg. He had two children from his second marriage.

== Career ==
He taught writing and literature at Mount Holyoke College and Bard College at Simon's Rock. Smyth eventually left academia after 10 years of teaching, and moved to Greece for a year. During his time spent on the Islands of Aegina and Crete, he continued to write. In addition to poetry, he wrote two novels and a prose-poem memoir before moving back to New England. Two of his books were illustrated by the artist Barry Moser, and several of his poems have been set to music by his half brother, trumpeter/composer John D'earth. He died in Charlottesville, Virginia, just after completing a book, A Plausible Light: New and Collected Poems.

== Publications ==
Smyth's poetry and writing were published in American Scholar, Atlantic Monthly, Beloit Poetry Journal, California Quarterly, Christian Science Monitor, Cyphers (Dublin), Kenyon Review, Lyric, Mississippi Review, Poetry, Sewanee Review, and Shenandoah, among others.

== Small Press Books ==
Plausible Light: New and Collected Poems (El Leon Literary Arts, 2008) Conversions (University of Georgia Press, 1974) The Cardinal Sins: A Bestiary (Pennyroyal Press, ill. Barry Moser, 1980) Thistles and Thorns: Abraham and Sarah at Bethel (Abattoir Editions, University of Nebraska at Omaha, ill. Barry Moser, 1977) Fifty Sonnets (Windy Row Press, 1973) Shadowed Leaves (Press Porcepic, 1973) Native Grass (Windy Row Press, 1972)

== Awards and honors ==
During his life, Paul Smyth won the Dillon Memorial Prize, a Mount Holyoke College Faculty Fellowship, and three annual awards from the Lyric Foundation.
