= Mary Gilmore Williams =

American college professor

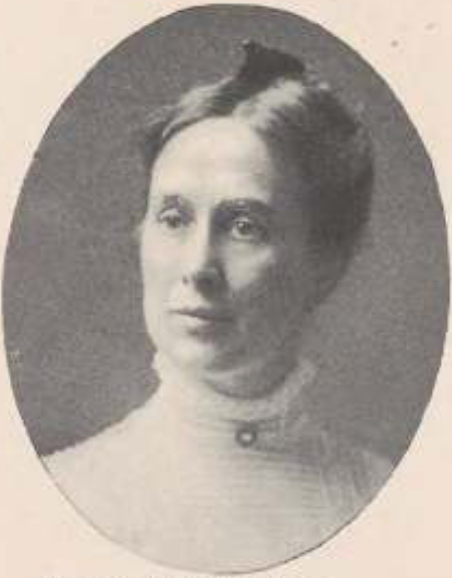
- Mary Gilmore Williams, from the 1910 Mount Holyoke College yearbook
- Born: June 9, 1863; Urbana, New York
- Died: May 30, 1938 (aged 74); Corning, New York
- Occupations: College professor, classics scholar

Mary Gilmore Williams (June 9, 1863–May 30, 1938) was an American college professor who taught Greek at Mount Holyoke College from 1898 to 1929 and wrote a study of Roman empresses.

== Early life and education ==
Mary Gilmore Williams was born in Urbana, New York, and raised in Corning, New York, the daughter of Francis Asbury Williams and Letitia Jane Clark Williams. Her father was an attorney.

Williams graduated from Mount Holyoke Seminary in 1885. In 1897, Williams completed doctoral studies at the University of Michigan, where she was the first woman student awarded the Elisha Jones Classical Fellowship, and one of the first women to receive a Ph.D. at Michigan. She pursued post-doctoral studies at the American School for Classical Studies in Rome.

== Career ==
Williams taught Latin at Kirkwood Seminary and Lake Erie College from 1889 to 1894. She taught Greek at Mount Holyoke College from 1898, became a professor in 1902, and was the head of the Greek department when she retired in 1929. She wrote a study of the lives of Roman empresses Julia Domna and Julia Avita Mamaea, which was published in 1902, and is still cited in classical scholarship, over a century later. She was a member of the Archaeological Institute of America, the American Philological Association, and the Classical Association of New England (CANE).

== Personal life ==
Williams lived with her mother and brother in Corning for much of her adult life. She died there in 1938, aged 74 years, and her grave is in Corning's Hope Cemetery.
