= Carol Geary Schneider =

Former Organization President

Carol Geary Schneider was president of the Association of American Colleges and Universities from 1998 to 2016.

Schneider received her B.A. in history from Mount Holyoke College, Phi Beta Kappa, magna cum laude in 1967. She received her Ph.D. in history from Harvard University and taught at the University of Chicago, DePaul University, Chicago State University and Boston University.

She has served in the past as a member of the Board of Trustees at Mount Holyoke.
