= Chmba =

Malawian social entrepreneur, DJ and music producer

Chmba Ellen Chilemba (born 25 March 1994), popularly known as Chmba, is a Malawian social entrepreneur, DJ, and music producer. She is the founder of Tiwale, a youth‑led organization based in Malawi that supports women and gender minorities through education, vocational training, and entrepreneurship.

== Early life and education ==
Chilemba was born in Blantyre, Malawi, and raised in Lilongwe. She graduated in 2010 from the African Leadership Academy in South Africa. She later attended Mount Holyoke College, earning a bachelor's degree in economics and studio art. At age 15, Chilemba witnessed a close friend being forced into marriage, which she has described as a formative experience that became a motivating factor behind her later work in education and community development. .

== Career ==
In 2012, Chilemba founded Tiwale, a youth‑led community organization focused on improving access to education and economic resources for women and gender minorities. The name “Tiwale” means “let us shine” in Chichewa. The organization was launched at a time when child marriage was still legal in Malawi.

Tiwale provides programs such as business and design workshops, vocational training (e.g., fashion design, sewing, tie‑dye), and classes in music tech, digital literacy, and STEM. It also offers education grants, classes, access to a library, and menstrual and mental health workshops. The organization partners with Malawi’s Ministry of Health to deliver sexual health education and distribute sanitary products.

As of 2021, Tiwale had supported over 367 women and gender minorities. Its microloan program saw a 100% repayment rate among the first 40 participants, many of whom started their own businesses. During the COVID‑19 pandemic, Tiwale distributed over 26,000 masks and reached more than 20,000 youth through awareness campaigns. Supporters include The Headley Trust, Frida Fund, Global Changemakers, and The Shawn Foundation.

Under the name Chmba, Chilemba has performed internationally. Her style blends Afro‑electronic, indie, and house influences, with themes of culture, identity, and mental health. She began experimenting with music at a young age and received her first DJ controller at 18. She has performed at the World Economic Forum, BBC Radio 6 Music, Women Deliver, Tumaini Festival, and Madonna's private Oscars event. She has shared lineups with Angélique Kidjo, Nile Rodgers, Metro Boomin, and Laura Mvula.

Her 2020 debut EP, Mtima Rising, received over 10,000 streams. She featured in DJ Mag, BBC Radio, and was named ISGUBHU Artist of the Month by Apple Music. She signed to the music distribution platform Platoon.

== Awards and recognition ==
Chilemba was named a Global Teen Leader in 2013 by the We Are Family Foundation and was featured on Humans of New York. In 2015, she was included in Forbes Africa’s “30 Under 30” list, received the Powell Exemplary Leader Award and she was a finalist in that years Commonwealth Youth Awards.

In 2016, she received the Humanitarian Award from the We Are Family Foundation. In 2017, she was named Glamour Magazine’s College Woman of the Year. She has been a Goalkeeper with the Gates Foundation, a Global Citizen Youth Advocate, a One Young World Ambassador, and an Ashoka Future Forward Awardee. In 2021, she was named a Kofi Annan Changemaker and received a Seed Award from the Prince Claus Fund. She became a Director of the Youth To The Front Fund at the We Are Family Foundation.
