= David Truman =

American academic

14th President of Mount Holyoke College
- In office 1969–1978
- Preceded by: Meribeth E. Cameron
- Succeeded by: Elizabeth Topham Kennan

Dean of Columbia College
- In office 1963–1967
- Preceded by: John Gorham Palfrey
- Succeeded by: Henry S. Coleman (interim)

Personal details
- Born: June 1, 1913 Evanston, Illinois
- Died: August 28, 2003 (aged 90) Sarasota, Florida
- Education: Amherst College; University of Chicago
- Profession: Professor

David Bicknell Truman (June 1, 1913 – August 28, 2003) was an American academic who served as the 14th president of Mount Holyoke College from 1969–1978. He is also known for his role as a Columbia University administrator during the Columbia University protests of 1968. Truman was an elected member of both the American Philosophical Society and the American Academy of Arts and Sciences.

== Background and family ==
Truman was born and raised in Evanston, Illinois. He received his B.A. from Amherst College and his doctorate from the University of Chicago. He is the father of economist Edwin M. Truman.

== Political science ==
Truman was a prominent political scientist and is known for his contributions to the theory of political pluralism.

== Administrative roles ==
He taught at a number of institutions before joining Columbia University in 1950. There, in addition to teaching political science, he undertook a number of administrative roles, serving successively as head of the department of public law and government (1959–61), Dean of Columbia College (1962–67), and Vice-President and Provost (1967–69). In 1969, Truman "stepped down after a tumultuous year of student unrest. During the student-lead [sic] takeover of the University, Truman was continually mentioned as a University administrator who retained the student body's respect."

Truman became president of Mount Holyoke College in 1969 and stayed until 1978. Truman oversaw the decision to remain a woman's college in 1971.

His obituary from Mount Holyoke noted, "both at Columbia and Mount Holyoke, Truman was involved in dealing with the significant student unrest of the late 1960s and 1970s. At both campuses he faced student protests and takeovers regarding such difficult issues as race and the Vietnam War. Despite these challenges, which were common on college campuses during the Vietnam Era, Truman left a lasting legacy as a warm and caring leader."

== Scholarship ==
- Administrative Decentralization (1940)
- The Governmental Process: Political Interests and Public Opinion. New York: Knopf, 1951
- The Congressional Party (1959)

Academic offices
Preceded by Meribeth E. Cameron	President of Mount Holyoke College; 1969–1978	Succeeded by Elizabeth Topham Kennan
Preceded by John Gorham Palfrey	Dean of Columbia College; 1963–1967	Succeeded by Henry S. Coleman (acting)
