= Gloria Johnson-Powell =

American child psychiatrist

Gloria Johnson-Powell (born Gloria Johnson, 1936 – October 11, 2017) was a child psychiatrist who was also an important figure in the Civil Rights Movement and was one of the first African-American women to attain tenure at Harvard Medical School.

== Background and career ==
She grew up in Boston, Massachusetts and attended Boston Latin Academy. She received her B.A. in economics and sociology from Mount Holyoke College in 1958 and her M.D. in 1962 from Meharry Medical College in Nashville, Tennessee. She completed her residency at UCLA and was on the faculty there for fifteen years before joining the Harvard Medical School (where she was on the faculty for ten years).

She was the University of Wisconsin School of Medicine and Public Health associate dean for cultural diversity and a professor of psychiatry and pediatrics.

=== Civil Rights Movement ===
In his 1999 book, The Children, David Halberstam includes her as one of the key figures in the Civil Rights Movement.

=== Scholarship ===
Her text, Black Monday's Children, discusses the effect of desegregation on southern black children and she has continued working with minority children. Johnson-Powell has also published a book about the impact of sexual abuse on children. In addition, with her daughter, she wrote the biography of her mother.

== Death ==
Johnson-Powell died on October 11, 2017, in Hamburg, Germany. She was 81.

== Works ==
- Black Monday's Children: A Study Of The Effects Of School Desegregation On The Self-Concepts Of Southern Children
- The Psychosocial Development of Minority Children editor Brunner/Mazel New York 1983 ISBN 0-87630-277-0
- Lasting Effects of Child Sexual Abuse co-editor with Gail Elizabeth Wyatt, Sage Publications 1998 Newbury Park ISBN 0-8039-3256-1
- The House On Elbert Street: The Biography Of A Welfare Mother
- Transcultural Child Development: Psychological Assessment and Treatment co-editor with Joe Yamamoto Wiley New York 1997 ISBN 0-471-17479-3
