= Peter Berek =

American Shakespeare scholar

- Born: Brooklyn, New York
- Occupation: Professor
- Writing career
- Genre: Renaissance literature
- Subject: Shakespeare
- Notable works: Cross-Dressing, Gender and Absolutism in the Beaumont and Fletcher Plays

Peter Berek is a Professor of English and Shakespearean scholar at Amherst College. He also served as the dean of faculty and provost of Mount Holyoke College from 1990 to 1998. He was the interim president of Mount Holyoke College in Fall 1995.

== Background ==
Berek was born in Brooklyn, New York. He received a B.A. from Amherst College in 1961, M.A. from Harvard University in 1963, and Ph.D. from Harvard University in 1967. He resided in the English department at Williams College from 1967 to 1990. He joined the English department at Mount Holyoke in 1990.

== Notable Career Oppertunities ==
Berek has worked with the Shakespeare Association of America (SAA) where he contributed as a visiting scholar, to the 2020 seminar titled Evaluating Shakespeare Adaptations.

== Publications ==
- "Cross-Dressing, Gender, and Absolutism in the Beaumont and Fletcher Plays." SEL: Studies in English Literature 1500–1900, vol. 44, no. 2, pp. 359–77, Spring 2004.
- "The Jew as Renaissance Man." Renaissance Quarterly, vol. 51, no. 1, pp. 128–62, Spring 1998.
- "Text, Gender, and Genre in The Taming of the Shrew." In Charney, Maurice (ed.). 1988. Bad" Shakespeare: Revaluations of the Shakespeare Canon. (pp. 91–104). Rutherford, NJ: Fairleigh Dickinson.
- "Locrine and Selimus." In Bowers, Fredson (ed. and foreword). 1987. Elizabethan Dramatists. (pp. 369–72). Detroit, MI: Gale.
- "The 'Upstart Crow,' Aesop's Crow, and Shakespeare as a Reviser." Shakespeare Quarterly, vol. 35, no. 2, pp. 205–07, Summer 1984.
- "Artifice and Realism in Lyly, Nashe, and Love's Labor's Lost." SEL: Studies in English Literature 1500–1900, vol. 23, no. 2, pp. 207–21, Spring 1983.
- "Tamburlaine's Weak Sons: Imitation as Interpretation before 1593." Renaissance Drama, vol. 13, pp. 55–82, 1982.
- "Doing and Undoing: The Value of Action in Antony and Cleopatra." Shakespeare Quarterly, vol. 32, no. 3, pp. 295–304, Fall 1981.
- "Locrine Revised, Selimus, and Early Responses to Tamburlaine." Research Opportunities in Renaissance Drama, vol. 23, pp. 33–54, 1980.
- "Interpretation, Allegory, and Allegoresis." College English, vol. 40, no. 2, pp. 117–32, Fall 1978.
- " 'As We Are Mock'd with Art': From Scorn to Transfiguration." SEL: Studies in English Literature 1500–1900, vol. 18, no. 2, pp. 289–305, Spring 1978.
- "The Voices of Marvell's Lyrics." Modern Language Quarterly, vol. 32, pp. 143–57, 1971.

== Awards ==
- The Monroe Kirk Spears Award for the best essay of the year published in the journal Studies in English Literature, 1500–1900 (for "Cross-Dressing, Gender, and Absolutism in the Beaumont and Fletcher Plays")
