= Jetta Jones =

American lawyer (1926–2021)

- Jetta A. Norris, from a 1946 issue of The Crisis
- Born: Jetta Ann Norris; February 24, 1926; Philadelphia, Pennsylvania
- Died: April 9, 2021 (aged 95); Los Angeles, California
- Occupation(s): Lawyer, city official

Jetta Ann Norris Jones (February 24, 1926 – April 9, 2021) was an American lawyer, city official, and philanthropist based in Chicago. She was the first Black woman trustee at the Art Institute of Chicago, and served on the boards of the NAACP Legal Defense Fund and the National Urban League.

== Early life ==
Jetta Anne Norris was born in Philadelphia, the daughter of lawyer and newspaperman J. Austin Norris and Marie Mitchell Norris. She attended Northfield Mount Hermon Academy, graduated from Mount Holyoke College in 1947, and completed a law degree at Yale Law School.

== Career ==
During law school and while she was serving a clerkship with Judge Herbert E. Millen, Norris also worked in the Philadelphia office of the Pittsburgh Courier, a prominent Black newspaper. She interviewed a lynching victim's mother for the paper in 1947. In 1948, she was elected vice-president of the Young Democratic Clubs of Pennsylvania.

Jones moved to Chicago with her husband in the late 1950s, where she worked as a lawyer in the firms of Claude Holman and Cyril Robinson. She was inducted into the Alpha Gamma Pi professional sorority in 1964. She was Mayor Harold Washington's Director of External Affairs in the 1980s, and worked for the City of Chicago as Chair of the Joint Human Relations Council. In 1991, she and her husband hosted a fundraiser for Virginia gubernatorial candidate Douglas Wilder in their Hyde Park home.

Jones was co-chair of the Legal Defense Fund of the NAACP, and served on the boards of the National Urban League, the Lincoln Park Zoological Society, the Mount Holyoke College Museum of Art. She was the first Black woman trustee of the Art Institute of Chicago. She was active on the Women's Boards at the University of Chicago and Northwestern University, and in The Girl Friends, Inc., a national Black women's organization. She was a founding member of the Women's Foundation of Chicago. Jones and her husband had a noted and eclectic art collection, and donated art to the Art Institute of Chicago, the Museum of Contemporary Art, Chicago State University, and other institutions.

== Personal life ==
Jetta Norris married obstetrician and gynecologist James E. Jones in 1953, the day after he graduated from medical school. They lived in England for two years in the 1950s, while he was in the United States Air Force. They had three children together. She was widowed when her husband died in 2006. She had dementia in her last years, and died in 2021, aged 95 years, in Los Angeles, California.
