= Melissa McGrath =

Astronomer

- Born: Nebraska
- Occupation: Planetary Scientist
- Known for: Study of Atmospheres and Magnetospheres of Planets
- Spouse: James Kinnally

Academic background
- Education: Mount Holyoke College
- Thesis: (1988)

Academic work
- Discipline: Astronomy

Melissa McGrath (born 1955) is an astronomer whose expertise is the atmosphere and magnetosphere of the Solar System planets and their moons. Her main interest has focused on imaging and spectroscopic studies of Jupiter’s Galilean moons. She is currently co-investigator on the ultraviolet spectrometer instrument on ESA JUICE mission to Ganymede, and co-investigator on two proposed instruments on the NASA Europa Clipper mission. McGrath is senior scientist at SETI Institute in Mountain View, California.

== Biography ==
Originally from Grand Island, Nebraska, McGrath lives in Huntsville, Alabama with her husband. Her first connection to outer space was in high school, when she slept outside to watch the night sky and saw the Perseid meteor shower. She attended Mount Holyoke College, in South Hadley, Massachusetts and received her BA in Physics and Astronomy in 1977. Originally, Dr. McGrath intended to be a French major, but switched to a double major in physics and astronomy after an introductory astronomy class, followed by an inter-term class, featuring Carl Sagan. She then attended the University of Virginia and received her Masters in Astronomy in 1984, followed by her Doctorate in Astronomy in 1988. This led to a postdoctoral fellowship at Johns Hopkins University in Baltimore.

== Work experience ==
From 1992 to 2003, The Space Telescope Science Institute, earning the title of Full Astronomer. 2005, NASA Deputy Director of the Science and Technology Directorate at NASA's Marshall Space Flight Center. Later 2005, One year detail as Deputy Director of Science Mission Directorate's Planetary Science Division at NASA HQ. 2006, Chief Scientist at Marshall, until retired from NASA in January 2015.

== Affiliations ==
Served as Chair of American Astronomical Society's Division of Planetary Science President of International Astronomical Union's Commission 16 (Physical Studies of Planets and Satellites)

She was elected a Legacy Fellow of the American Astronomical Society in 2020.

== Current activities ==
Editor of the Astronomical Journal and the Astrophysical Journal Letters Co-investigator of Ultraviolet Spectrometer instrument on ESA JUICE mission to Ganymede, launching in 2022. Co-investigator on two proposed instruments for NASA's Europa Clipper Mission.
