= Kerstin Nordstrom =

American physicist

Kerstin N. Nordstrom
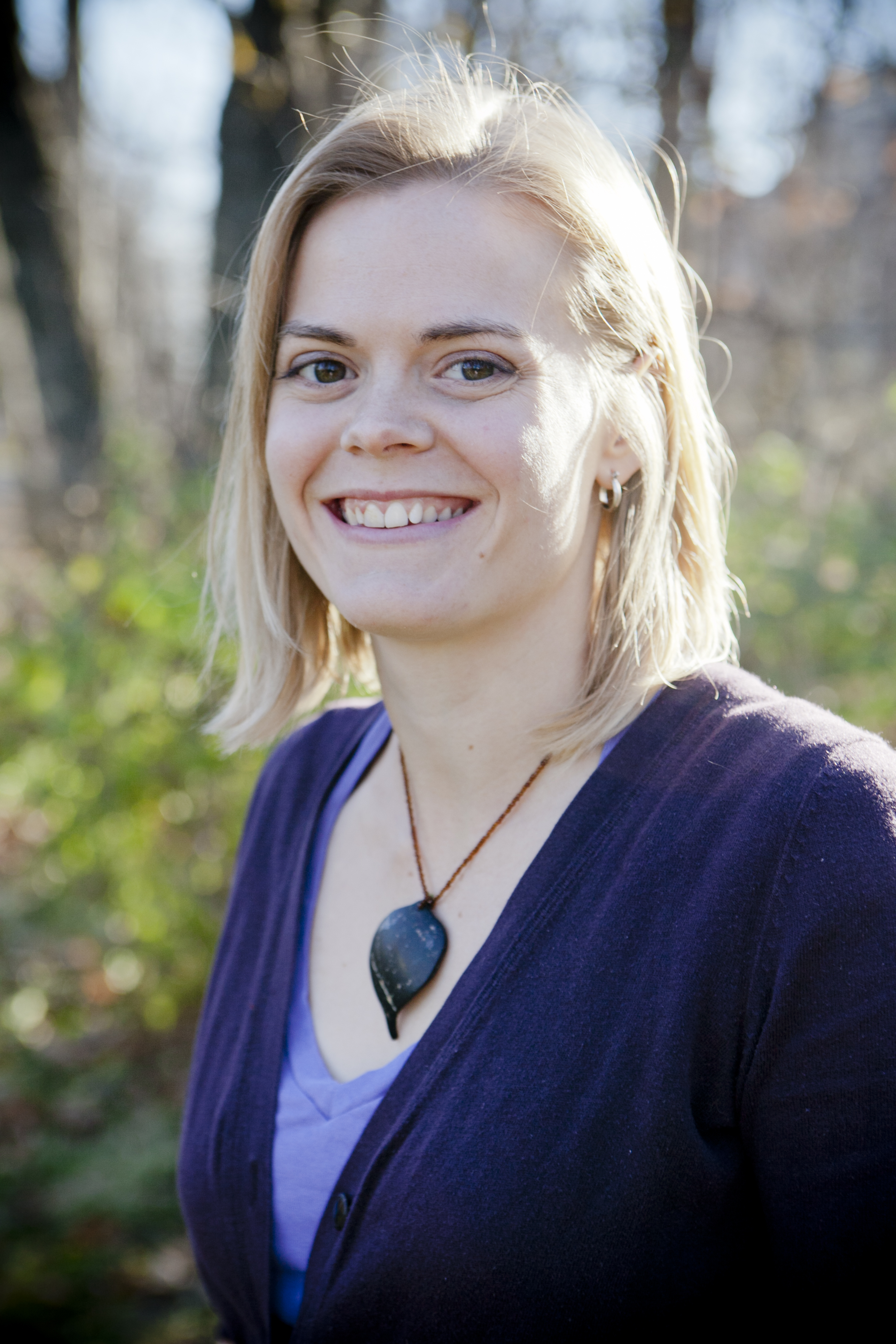
- Education: Bryn Mawr College; University of Pennsylvania
- Awards: NSF Career Award
- Scientific career
- Thesis: Jamming and Flow of Soft Particle Suspensions (2010)
- Website: https://kerstinnordstrom.com/

Kerstin N. Nordstrom is an American physicist who is the Clare Boothe Luce Assistant Professor of Physics in the Department of Physics at Mount Holyoke College. Her research focuses on soft matter physics; her work has been featured in the LA Times and in the BBC News.

== Early life and education ==
Nordstrom completed a bachelor's degree in physics and mathematics at Bryn Mawr College in 2004. She joined the University of Pennsylvania as a graduate student, earning a Master of Science in 2006 and a PhD in 2010. Her doctoral thesis focused on the "Jamming and flow of soft particle suspensions." In 2011, Nordstrom joined the University of Maryland, College Park as a postdoctoral researcher. At the University of Maryland, Nordstrom worked on several topics, including how beds of granular materials respond to impact and how razor clams burrow in sand.

== Research and career ==
In 2014, Nordstrom joined Mount Holyoke College as an assistant professor. She is interested in complex fluid flows, including the systems of solid particles found in granular materials.

== Awards and honors ==
- 2012 AAAS Mass Media Fellow
- 2018 Cottrell Scholar Award
- 2019 National Science Foundation CAREER Award

== External media ==
- In 2016, Nordstrom appeared on Jeopardy!.
