= Jill Bubier =

American academic

Jill L. Bubier
- Education: PhD., McGill University, Physical Geography, 1994 M.S., University of Vermont, Botany, 1989 J.D., University of Maine School of Law, 1978 B.A., Bowdoin College, 1974
- Known for: Studying greenhouse gas exchange in boreal, sub-arctic, and arctic area.
- Scientific career
- Workplaces: Professor Emeritus at Mount Holyoke College

Jill L. Bubier is an American academic who is professor emerita of environmental science at Mount Holyoke College (MHC). Her research examines how Northern ecosystems respond to climate change.

== Education ==
Bubier graduated from Bowdoin College in 1974 with a bachelor's degree in government and history. She then studied in University of Maine School of Law to earn her Juris Doctor (J.D.) degree in 1978. She earned a Master of Science (M.S.) in botany at the University of Vermont in 1989. She then earned her PhD in physical geography at McGill University in 1994. Bubier's PhD thesis "Methane flux and plant distribution in northern peatlands" examined at how floristic pattern relates to methane emission in the mid-boreal clay belt region of Canada, and sub-arctic region of Quebec.

== Career and research ==
Bubier worked briefly as a staff attorney in the Marine Law Institute. Among her responsibilities were researching the management decisions made by fisheries. As part of this work, she attended the New England Fishery Management Council, and discovered differences in perspective between fishermen and biologists that she viewed as irreconcilable, because the biologists were thinking more long-term than the fishermen, and the fishermen were disinterested in evidence of significant population declines. As a result, she observed, the negotiations regarding gear restrictions and the number of fishing license to issue were "just nickel-and-diming," rather than facing the problem head-on.

At the Coastal Zone 85 Conference in Baltimore, she presented a paper on "The Atlantic Striped Bass Conservation Act" in 1985.

Bubier is a professor emeritus in the Environmental Science department of Mount Holyoke College where she began working in 1998. Her research focused at peatland, wetland ecology, plant ecology, greenhouse gases exchange, and the related feedbacks connected to climate change. Moreover, in Bubier's time as a professor, she did not abandon her role as a field scientist, working in the peatland systems of boreal, sub-arctic, and Arctic regions in Canada, Alaska, and Scandinavia. One of her most cited papers, "Spatial and Temporal Variability in Growing-Season Net Ecosystem Carbon Dioxide Exchange at a Large Peatland in Ontario, Canada" addressed the net ecosystem exchange (NEE) of carbon dioxide (CO_{2}) across the peatland in Ottawa to better understand and predict the ecosystem response to climate change.

Bubier also has received funding awards from multiple organizations including the NSF and NASA. In 1999, she received a grant of $350,000 study boreal system's atmospheric exchange. She received ~$500K from NSF for her research titled "Strategies for Understanding the Effects of Global Climate and Environmental Change on Northern Peatlands" in 2004. She also received another grant of ~$885K for her research titled "Ecosystem responses to atmospheric N deposition in an ombrotrophic bog: vegetation and microclimate feedbacks lead to stronger C sink or source?" in 2014.

Some of her notable publications include:

- Spatial and Temporal Variability in Growing-Season Net Ecosystem Carbon Dioxide Exchange at a Large Peatland in Ontario, Canada.
- Ecological controls on methane emissions from a Northern Peatland Complex in the zone of discontinuous permafrost, Manitoba, Canada.
- The Relationship of Vegetation to Methane Emission and Hydrochemical Gradients in Northern Peatlands.
- Methane Emissions from Wetlands in the Midboreal Region of Northern Ontario, Canada.
- Seasonal patterns and controls on net ecosystem CO_{2} exchange in a boreal peatland complex.

== Awards and honors ==
From 2007 to 2009, she was a member of the Advisory Committee for Environmental Research and Education in the National Science Foundation (NSF), on which she helped set guidelines for the priorities of Environmental Science research. She was awarded with Editors' Citation for Excellence in Refereeing in 2003 for reviewing Global Biogeochemical Cycles.
