= Mary McHenry =

American literary scholar (1933–2021)

- Born: Mary Elizabeth Williamson; January 23, 1933 Washington, D.C., U.S.
- Died: March 1, 2021 (aged 88) Washington, D.C., U.S.
- Occupation: Academic
- Genre: African-American literature
- Spouse: Harry Saunders Murphy Jr. (1954-1959; divorced); Donald F. McHenry (1962-1976; divorced)
- Children: 3

Mary McHenry (née Mary Elizabeth Williamson, formerly Murphy; January 23, 1933 – March 1, 2021) was "credited with bringing African-American literature to Mount Holyoke College," where she taught from 1974 to 1988, retiring as Emeritus Professor of English.

McHenry introduced her student, future Pulitzer Prize-winning playwright Suzan-Lori Parks, to Five Colleges faculty member James Baldwin during the 1980s. Parks referred to McHenry as her favorite English teacher at Mount Holyoke College.

== Background ==
McHenry was born Mary Elizabeth Williamson in Washington, D.C., to Alphonso Williamson (who worked with the Library of Congress) and Elizabeth Bennett Williamson (a teacher). She graduated from Oakwood School in Poughkeepsie, New York, in 1950, received her B.A. in English literature from Mount Holyoke College in 1954, her M.A. from Columbia University in 1960, and continued further graduate work at George Washington University from 1961 to 1964.

McHenry was married and divorced twice. Her first marriage was to Harry Saunders Murphy Jr. The couple married on July 31, 1954, and divorced around 1959. They had a son together. Three years later in 1962, she married Donald McHenry, a diplomat who went on to become United States Ambassador to the United Nations. Donald and Mary have two daughters together and divorced on August 8, 1976. One of her daughters, Elizabeth McHenry, is a professor of English at New York University.

== Career ==
McHenry taught at Howard University (1960–1963), George Washington University (1964–1969), and Federal City College (1969–1974). McHenry then taught at Mount Holyoke from 1974 until her retirement in 1998 "and was also a member of the American Studies and the Black (later African-American) Studies departments."

The Mary McHenry Papers (1933–1996) were exhibited from October 29 - November 26, 2007, at Mount Holyoke College.

McHenry received recognition for her contributions to Mount Holyoke College. In 2001, McHenry's daughter, Elizabeth, honored her mother at the Elizabeth T. Kennen Lecture where she gave a presentation entitled, "Forgotten Readers: The Lost History of African American Literary Societies." The lecture highlighted "black readers and reading societies from the nineteenth- and early twentieth-centuries." Furthermore, personal documents were on display in the Mount Holyoke College in the Archives and Special Collections Lobby in Dwight Hall from October 26-November 27, 2007. Documents of her life are divided into eleven different sections and cover her life between 1933 and 1996. The files include personal correspondence, writings and speeches, yearbooks, and more ranging from her childhood to her time on faculty at Mount Holyoke College.

She impacted Mount Holyoke College by incorporating the field of African American literature into the college. Her contributions as a professor "continue to enrich many students' experience in studying literature". When she first arrived in the early 1950s as a student, there were only five African American women in the entire college. She graduated in 1954. Twenty years after graduation, she returned to Mount Holyoke College in 1974 to take up a position as an English professor. When she returned to join the faculty, there were 140 African American students attending Mount Holyoke College. Her daughter, Elizabeth McHenry, followed in her steps, teaching African American literature.

Mary McHenry died on March 1, 2021, aged 88, at her home in Washington, D.C.
