= Anna Lockhart Flanigen =

American chemist

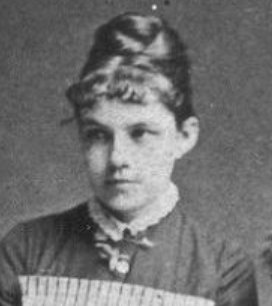
- Anna Lockhart Flanigen, photographed in the 1870s, from an 1899 publication
- Born: January 26, 1852; Philadelphia
- Died: February 19, 1928; Philadelphia
- Other names: Annie L. Flanigan
- Occupation(s): Chemist, college professor

Anna Lockhart Flanigen (January 26, 1852 – February 19, 1928) was an American scientist. She was one of the first two women students at the University of Pennsylvania, and later taught chemistry at Mount Holyoke College.

== Early life and education ==
Flanigen was born in Philadelphia, the daughter of William C. Flanigan and Jane Adams Flanigan. (Her family name is spelled variously in sources as Flanigen, Flanigan, Flanagan; she used the first spelling in publications.)

Flanigen attended the Women's Medical College of Pennsylvania. She enrolled at the University of Pennsylvania's Towne Scientific School as a "special student" in 1876, along with Gertrude Klein Pierce; they were the first women students at Penn. They were allowed to take courses but were considered ineligible for a degree, instead receiving "certificates of proficiency" in 1878. Flanigen pursued further studies in Berlin and London, worked with William Ramsay, and returned to Penn to complete a Ph.D. in 1906. Her doctoral thesis under Edgar Fahs Smith was titled "The electrolytic precipitation of copper from an alkaline cyanide electrolyte" (1906).

== Career ==
Flanigen taught physics and chemistry at Penn after college, and worked as a chemist and assayer at the Keystone Watch Case Company from 1883 to 1898. She was secretary of the New Century Guild of Working Women when it formed in Philadelphia in 1886. She attended the Lake Placid Conference on Home Economics in 1903. She was an assistant professor of chemistry at Mount Holyoke College from 1903 to 1910.

== Personal life ==
Flanigen died in 1928, in Philadelphia, aged 76 years.
