= Elizabeth K. Worley =

American zoologist

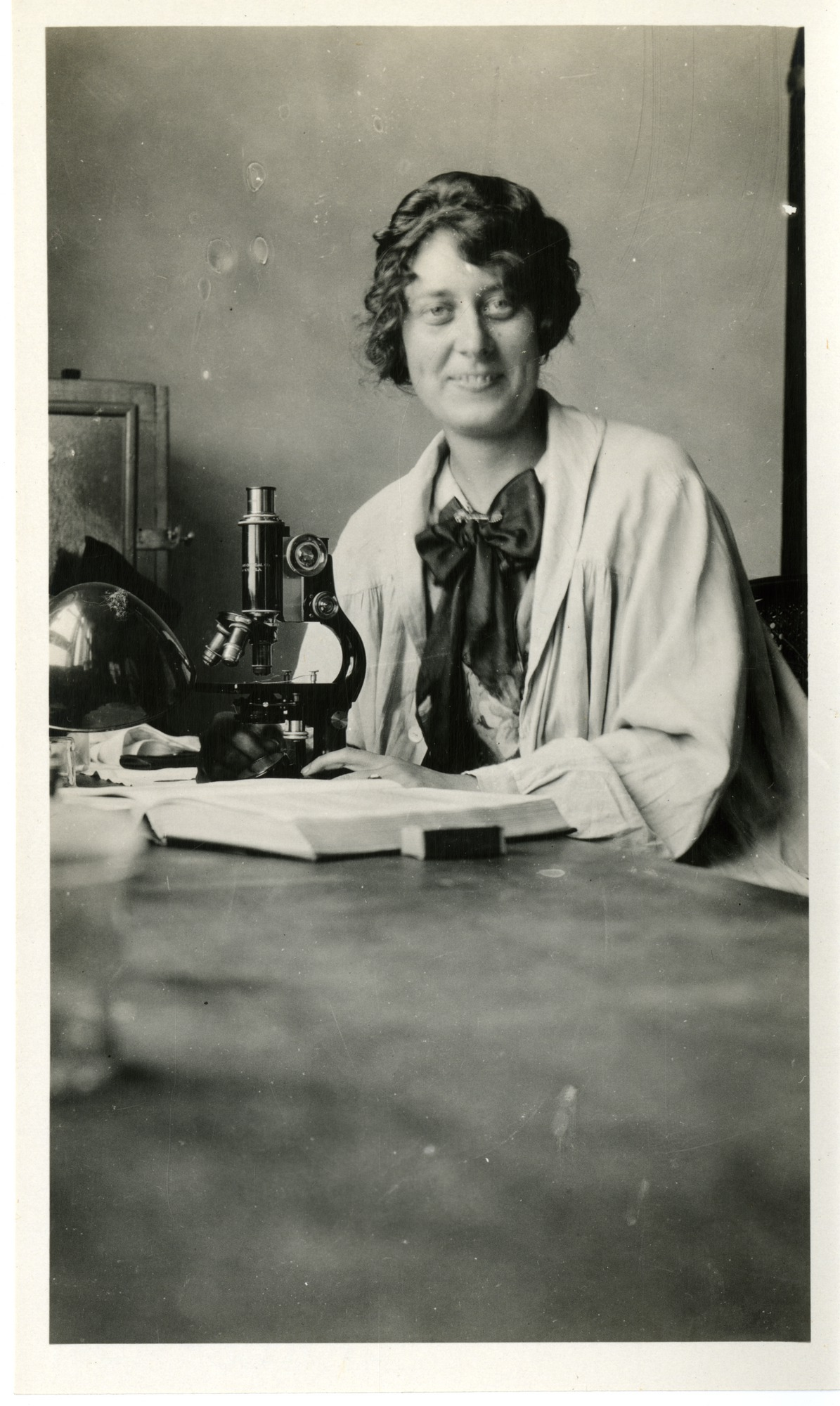
- Elizabeth Tucker Kinney at a microscope, from the Smithsonian Institution
- Born: Elizabeth Tucker Kinney; January 5, 1904; South Hadley, Massachusetts
- Died: May 5, 2004 (aged 100); Seattle, Washington
- Occupations: Zoologist, microbiologist
- Spouse: Leonard G. Worley

Elizabeth Tucker Kinney Worley (January 5, 1904 – May 5, 2004), was an American zoologist and microbiologist.

== Early life and education ==
Kinney was born in South Hadley, Massachusetts, the daughter of Asa S. Kinney and Jean B. Tucker Kinney. Her father was a professor of botany and plant science at Mount Holyoke College. To mark her birth, her father planted a copper beech tree near Williston Library on the campus of Mount Holyoke; that tree "has become a fixture on campus: enchanting members of the campus community and visitors alike through the seasons".

Kinney graduated from Mount Holyoke College in 1924, and was active in Mount Holyoke alumnae activities. She pursued further studies at Washington University, where she earned a master's degree in 1926; she was elected to membership in Sigma Xi while there. She completed a doctorate at Columbia University in 1940, with a dissertation titled "A Study of the Sperm-Forming Components in Three Species of Decapoda" (1939).

== Career ==
Kinney taught zoology, anatomy, and physiology courses at Washington University, New York University, and the University of Pittsburgh. At Barnard College she taught courses and co-led the annual Camp Leadership Course for student leaders. Worley and her biologist husband both taught at Brooklyn College. In the 1940s, they collaborated on research on Golgi bodies, and he acknowledged her contributions to his publications. As E. K. Worley, she was still co-authoring research papers on marine invertebrates in the 1970s and 1980s.

== Personal life ==
Kinney married biology professor Leonard George Worley in 1931. They had two daughters and lived in Manhasset, New York. Her husband died in 1960. She died in 2004, aged 100 years, in Seattle. Two of her diaries are in the Mount Holyoke College Archives.
