= Eva Moseley =

American curator and archivist

Eva Steiner Moseley (born 1931), is an American curator and archivist. She has served as the curator of the Schlesinger Library on the History of Women at Radcliffe College in Cambridge, Massachusetts. Moseley has written on women in archives and has been involved in many institutions and organizations in at least administration level. Moseley has been involved with the Society of American Archivists as Council Member (1984–1987), served on multiple committees, and a frequent contributor and editor of the American Archivist (1982).

== Early life and education ==
Moseley was born on December 25, 1931, to Leopold and Isabella Steiner in Vienna, Austria. She and her family came to the United States in 1939 as refugees. She attended Mount Holyoke College for a Bachelor of Arts in philosophy, which she earned in 1953. She went on to Radcliffe College for her Master of Arts in Sanskrit and Indian Studies, graduating in 1955.

== Career ==
Since graduating with her Masters, Moseley has held various positions in libraries and archives around the world. She has also served as editor and contributor to journals and publications over her career. Some of her past employers include: Asia Foundation (San Francisco), Boolean Law Library and Institute of Commonwealth Studies (Oxford), and most notably, her roles as curator and director at Schlesinger Library at Radcliffe College, where she served from 1970 until her retirement in 1999.

=== Affiliations ===
- Founded the Harvard Hams in 1977
- President of Sara R. Ehrmann Foundation, 1980–1983.
- American Civil Liberties Union Foundation of Massachusetts: Member 1978–1980, Board of Directors 1980–1984, Public Education and Colloquium Committee Chair 1983–1984, Trustee since 1982, Secretary since 1990.
- Medford (Massachusetts) Historical Society: Chair Acquisitions Committee 1979–1987, Program Committee 1983–1989
- Society of American Archivists: Program Committee 1979, Manuscript Repositories Section Chair 1979–1980, Nominating Committee 1981, Local Arrangements Committee 1982, Committee on Goals and Priorities 1986–1989, Distinguished Service Award Subcommittee 1992–1995
- Academy of Certified Archivists: member, Examination Committee 1991–1994
- New England Archivists: Chair Program Committee 1975, 1979, 1982, Newsletter Editor 1975–1978, Associate Editor 1980–1983, Vice President, Chair of Long-Range Planning Committee 1988–1989, President 1989–1990, Chair of the Nominating Committee 1990–1991, Distinguished Service Award Committee 1995
- Boston Archivists Group: Co-founder 1977, Coordinator 1977–1982
- Harvard Radcliffe Manuscripts/Archives Group: Co-founder 1979, Steering Committee Member since 1980, Chair Publications Committee 1986–1990
- Berkshire Conference on the History of Women: Panel Chair, Speaker 1974, 1978, 1990, 1993, Phi Beta Kappa.

=== Selected publications ===
Moseley's writings have been cited by other archivists and scholars researching women in history. In her work, Moseley often considers the impact of feminism on history and archives and reflects the uncertainty of women's history when it was still a new field. However, she embraces the new field of women's history as "a welcome challenge, rather than an irritating distraction from collecting and research on the big names, female or male, of history." She notes the responsibility of archivists to preserve women's papers, while reluctant to be radical as an 'activist archivist.'

- "Women in Archives: Documenting the History of Women in America", American Archivist, 1973, JSTOR 40291488.
- "Sources for the 'New Women's History'", American Archivist, 1980, JSTOR 40292290 40292290.
- "One Half Our History", Harvard Library Bulletin, 1984, .
- "Labor Holdings at the Schlesinger Library, Radcliffe College", Labor History, 1992, doi:10.1080/00236569000890031.
- Women, Information, and the Future: Collecting and Sharing Resources Worldwide (edited), Highsmith Press, 1995.
- "Skirting History: Holocaust Refugee to Dissenting Citizen," Northampton, MA: Olive Branch Press, 2022.

== Recognition ==
A festschrift in honor of Moseley, A Sampling of Innocent Documents: Essays Dedicated to Eva Steiner Moseley, was published by Radcliffe College in 1999.
