= Marcia Hofmann =

American attorney

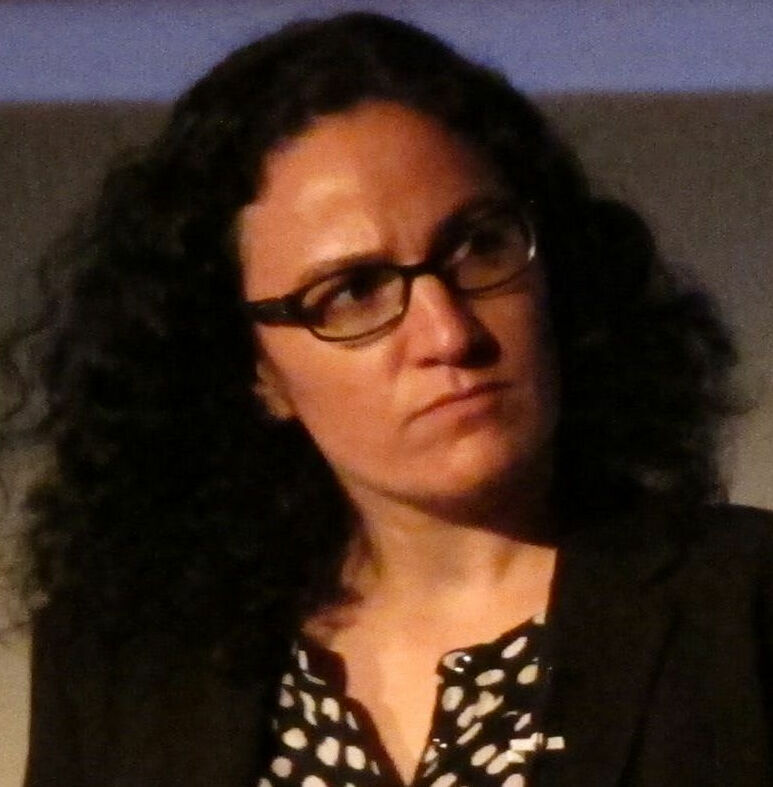
- Hofmann in 2014
- Born: Marcia Clare Hofmann; Ohio, U.S.
- Education: Mount Holyoke College, University of Dayton School of Law

Marcia Clare Hofmann (/ˈmɑːrʃə ˈhɔːfmɪn/) is an American attorney and US-UK Fulbright Scholar. Hofmann is known for her work as an advocate of electronic privacy and free expression, including defending individuals charged with high-profile computer crimes, such as Marcus Hutchins and Weev.

== Education ==
Hofmann is a graduate of Mount Holyoke College and the University of Dayton School of Law.

== Career ==
From 2003 to 2006, Hofmann served as staff counsel and director of the Open Government Project at the Electronic Privacy Information Center.

In 2006, Hofmann joined the Electronic Frontier Foundation as a staff attorney, where she continues to serve as special counsel. In addition to litigating many cases against federal agencies under the Freedom of Information Act, Hofmann is known for defending programmers and security researchers against charges related to security disclosures.

Between 2010 and 2014, Hofmann was a non-residential fellow with the Stanford Center for Internet and Society.

Hofmann left the EFF in 2013 to begin a private practice. Since then, she has helped represent Freedom of the Press Foundation in its ongoing lawsuits against the Justice Department, filed amicus briefs on behalf of several entities in Twitter's lawsuit against the Justice Department over the right to reveal surveillance requests, submitted comments on behalf of the EFF, Internet Archive, and Reddit to the New York State Department of Financial Services concerning its proposed BitLicense regulation, and commented to the United States Copyright Office on an exemption for security research to the prohibition of circumventing copyright protection systems in vehicles.

In 2020, Hofmann joined Twitter as product counsel.

Hofmann has taught as an adjunct professor at University of California Hastings College of the Law and University of Colorado Law School, and has been a featured speaker at many electronic privacy-related conferences.

== Notable cases ==
=== United States v. Auernheimer ===
Hofmann was part of the team that represented Andrew Auernheimer on appeal of his 2012 conviction for identity fraud and hacking conspiracy following his involvement in the exposure of a security flaw in an AT&T website. Among other issues, the defense argued that accessing a publicly available website does not constitute unauthorized access under the Computer Fraud and Abuse Act and Auernheimer should not have been charged in New Jersey (he was in Arkansas, while AT&T's servers were in Georgia and Texas during the events described in the indictment). The appeal was successful: the Third Circuit held that bringing the case in New Jersey was improper, vacated his conviction, and ordered him released from prison.

=== United States v. Under Seal ===
Hofmann represented Lavabit, an e-mail service provider, and its founder, Ladar Levison, in their appeal of a contempt order for refusing to hand over the company's private encryption keys to the government. The target of the investigation was widely speculated to be Edward Snowden.
