= Sonya Stephens =

American academic administrator

13th President of the American University of Paris
- Incumbent
- Assumed office September 1, 2022
- Preceded by: Celeste Schenck

18th President of Mount Holyoke College
- In office July 1, 2016 – August 31, 2022
- Preceded by: Lynn Pasquerella
- Succeeded by: Beverly Daniel Tatum (interim)

Personal details
- Spouse: John Triggs
- Children: 2
- Education: University of Cambridge (BA, PhD); Université de Montréal (MA)

Sonya Stephens is the current president of the American University of Paris and former president of Mount Holyoke College. She is the author of Baudelaire's Prose Poems: The Practice and Politics of Irony as well as the editor of A History of Women's Writing in France and Translation and the Arts in Modern France.

== Education ==
Stephens studied at New Hall, a college for women at the University of Cambridge that is now known as Murray Edwards College, where she received her B.A. in modern and medieval languages. She holds a master's degree in French studies from the Université de Montréal and a doctorate in French from the University of Cambridge.

== Faculty career ==
She was chair of the Department of French at Royal Holloway, University of London and later chaired the Department of French and Italian and served as the first vice provost for undergraduate education at Indiana University Bloomington. She joined Mount Holyoke College in 2013 as dean of faculty and vice president for academic affairs. She became acting president in July 2016, following the resignation of Lynn Pasquerella. Stephens was officially named president on April 23, 2018. On March 2, 2022, Stephens announced she will be resigning in August 2022 to lead the American University of Paris. Beverly Daniel Tatum succeeded her as interim president, beginning in July 2022.

== Selected works ==
- Stephens, Sonya (1999). Baudelaire's Prose Poems: The Practice and Politics of Irony. Oxford University Press. ISBN 978-0198158776.
- Stephens, Sonya, ed. (2009). History of Women's Writing in France. Cambridge University Press. ISBN 9780511554025.
- Stephens, Sonya, ed. (2017). Translation and the Arts in Modern France. Indiana University Press. ISBN 9780253026149.
