= Judith Kurland =

Regional Director for the United States Department of Health and Human Services

Judith Kurland was a Regional Director for the United States Department of Health and Human Services during the second Clinton administration. She was appointed by Secretary of Health and Human Services Donna Shalala in 1997.

Kurland received her B.A. in political science from Mount Holyoke College in 1967. She served as the first Female Commissioner of the Boston Department of Health and Hospitals, Massachusetts from 1988 to 1993 and served on the faculty of the Harvard School of Public Health, Simmons College, and the medical schools of Boston University and Tufts University. From 1983 to 1988, she was vice president of strategic planning at the New England Medical Center.

Kurland began her public career in 1967 as legislative director for Thomas P. O'Neill, Jr., Speaker of the United States House of Representatives, and later served as chief of staff for former Congressman Michael J. Harrington of Massachusetts in 1973. She was on the board of trustees of Mount Holyoke College until 2000.

She served as Chief of Staff to Boston Mayor Thomas Menino from 2006 until January 2009, when she stepped down to take a job as Menino's chief of programs and partnerships. She currently is Executive Director Center for Community Democracy and Democratic Literacy McCormack Graduate School of Policy and Global Studies UMass Boston.

== Awards ==
- Distinguished Service Awards from the Massachusetts Pediatric AIDS Society and the National Society to Prevent Blindness.
