= C. Leigh Purtill =

American author of young adult fiction

- Born: May 26; Germany
- Education: Mount Holyoke College; Boston University (MS)
- Occupation: Novelist
- Writing career
- Period: 2007–present
- Genre: Young adult fiction
- Website: www.leighpurtill.com

C. Leigh Purtill (b. May 26) is an American author of young adult fiction.

== Biography ==
Purtill was born in Frankfurt, Germany and grew up on the east coast of the United States, mostly in the suburbs of Connecticut and Pennsylvania. Purtill graduated from Mount Holyoke College with degrees in anthropology and dance. She graduated magna cum laude and Phi Beta Kappa. She later received a Master of Science in film production at Boston University. Film work took her to New York City where she became a script supervisor on films, music videos and commercials.

In early 2000, she moved to Los Angeles with her husband where she worked as a broadcast standards editor (network censor) for The WB Television Network later renamed The CW Television Network on such shows as The Gilmore Girls and 7th Heaven.

Purtill currently resides in West Hollywood with her husband. Her latest book, Chasing the Falls, was self-published after having two books published by Penguin Group the author decided to go it alone.

== Bibliography ==
=== Novels ===
- Chasing the Falls (2012)
- Jennifer Aniston is My Best Friend - AKA: Love, Meg (2007 -2012)

=== Fat Girls in L.A. series ===
- Fat Girls in L.A. (Book 1: All About Vee) - AKA: All About Vee (2008 - 2011)
- Fat Girls in L.A. (Book 2: The Rise of Ginny) (forthcoming 2012)
