= Lucy Weston Pickett =

American chemist (1904-1997)

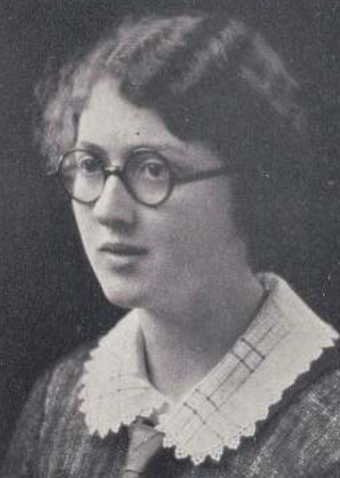
- Lucy Weston Pickett, from the 1925 yearbook of Mount Holyoke College
- Born: January 19, 1904; Beverly, Massachusetts
- Died: November 23, 1997 (aged 93); Bradenton, Florida
- Education: Mount Holyoke College (class of 1925) University of Illinois Royal Institution, London (fellowship 1932–1933) University of Liège and Harvard Educational Foundation Fellowship (1939)
- Employer(s): Professional experience: Goucher College, instructor (1927–1928) Mount Holyoke, instructor of chemistry (1930–1935), associate professor (1940–1945), professor of chemistry (1945–1968), chair of Department of Chemistry (1954–1962) The University of California, visiting professor (1947–1948)
- Honours: American Chemical Society, Garvan Medal, 1957; memorialized by Luck Pickett fund, Mount Holyoke (1968)

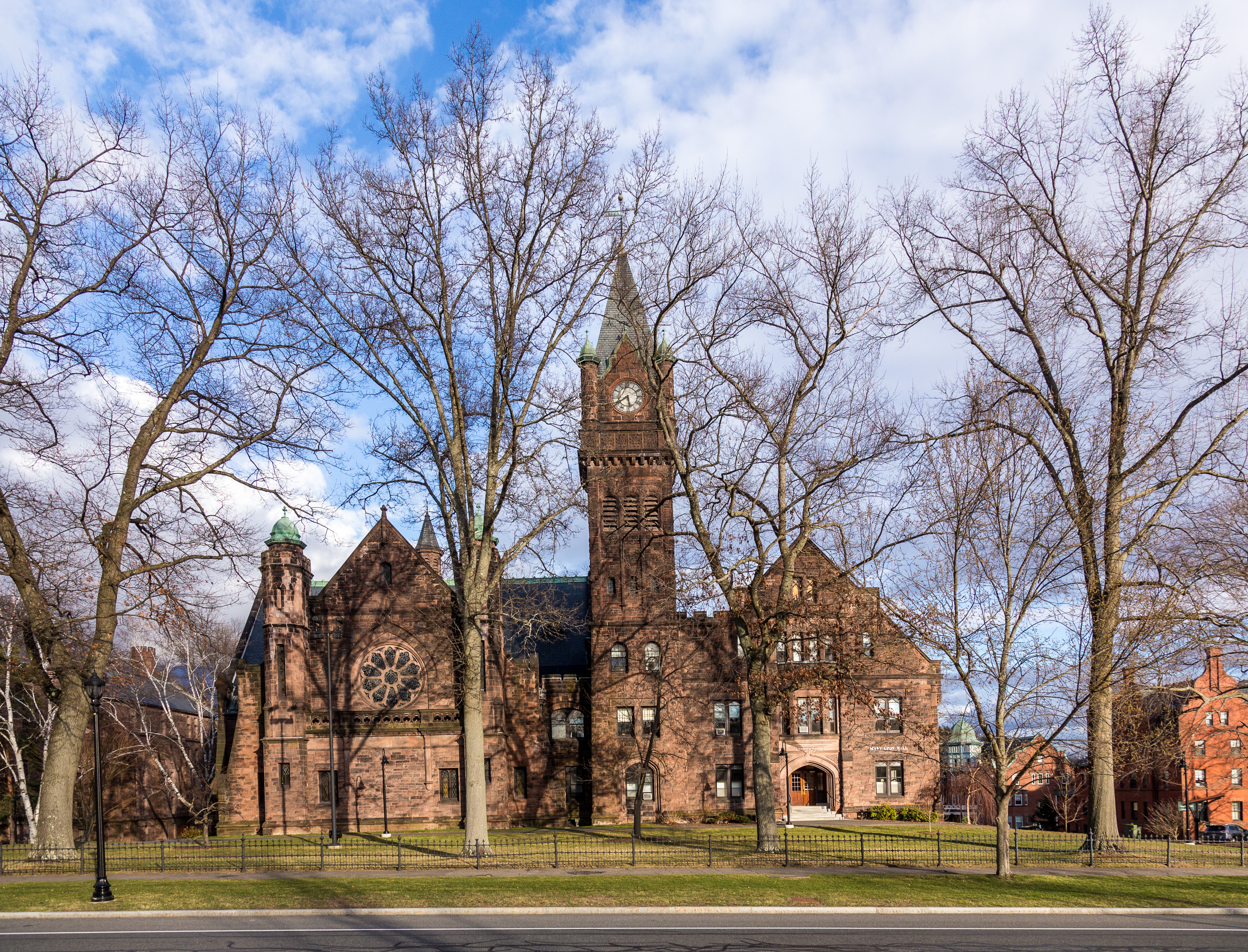
Mount Holyoke College Mary Lyon Hall

Lucy Weston Pickett (January 19, 1904 – November 23, 1997) was a Mary Lyon Professor and Camille and Henry Dreyfus Chair in Chemistry at Mount Holyoke College.

Her research on X-ray crystallography and ultraviolet absorption spectroscopy of organic molecules received numerous honors and was supported by grants from the Office of Naval Research, the National Science Foundation and the Petroleum Research Fund of the American Chemical Society.

== Early life ==
Pickett was born on January 19, 1904, in Beverly, Massachusetts, to Lucy Weston, a former school teacher and elementary school principal, and George Ernest Pickett, a former seaman. She had one brother, Thomas Austin Pickett, who also became a chemist. Both Lucy and Thomas led similar academic and professional lives, while still holding a close relationship.

== Education ==
Lucy W. Pickett attended high school in Beverly and later entered Mount Holyoke College in South Hadley, Massachusetts, in 1921 and graduated in 1925. Lucy planned on majoring in Latin but changed her mind to work in the sciences, having an attraction to chemistry. She double majored in chemistry and mathematics.

In, 1925, Pickett graduated with summa cum laude, both in chemistry, and in mathematics at Mount Holyoke. She continued to a master's degree in two years before moving to the University of Illinois, where she studied for her doctoral degree. Lucy earned a Ph.D. from the University of Illinois majoring in analytical chemistry with minors in both physical chemistry and physics. Her dissertation research explored the effects of X-rays on chemical reactions and the X-ray structures of organic compounds.

== Career ==
Pickett taught at Illinois and Goucher College before returning to Mount Holyoke in 1930. She would stay there until she retired in 1968. During her 1932–1933 leave she worked with the famous X-ray crystallographer and Nobel laureate Sir William Bragg at the Royal Institution, London. In 1939, on an Educational Foundation Fellowship she worked with Victor Henri at University of Liège, Belgium, and with George Kistiakowsky at Harvard.

As much as Lucy would have liked to have continued her work in X-ray crystallography, she returned to Mount Holyoke College to join in an active team of researchers, including Emma Perry Carr and Mary Sherrill, who were investigating molecular structures through spectroscopy. In 1939, Pickett went to Belgium to the University of Liege, where she began her work with spectroscopist, Victor Henri, and in the same year, to Harvard to work with molecular spectroscopist, George Kistiakowsky. In 1942, Pickett and Carr traveled to Chicago to attend a conference on spectroscopy organized by Robert S. Mulliken. Lucy worked with Milliken in 1952 on theoretical interpretations of the spectrum of the benzenium ion.

Her colleagues and students created The Lucy Pickett Lectureship, a lectureship designed to bring outstanding speakers to the Mount Holyoke campus. The first speaker was Robert Mulliken, 1966 Chemistry Nobel laureate, with whom Pickett had published a paper in 1954. In the 1970s, Pickett requested that the funds be used to honor women scientists.

== Publications ==
- The effect of X-rays on chemical reactions...An X-ray study of the structure of organic compounds.

== Honors and awards ==
- Fellow of the American Academy of Arts and Sciences in 1955.
- In 1957 she received the Francis P. Garvan Medal from the American Chemical Society for her research in molecular spectroscopy.
- Honorary D.Sc. from Ripon College in 1958
- Honorary D.Sc. from Mount Holyoke College in 1975
- Upon her retirement, colleagues, students, and friends honored Pickett's many contributions to Mount Holyoke by establishing a lectureship in her name. The chemistry department's Lucy W. Pickett annual lecture series, which brings outstanding women scientist to campus, continues to this day.
- In 1975, awarded the honorary doctor of science
