= Meribeth E. Cameron =

American academic (1905–1997)

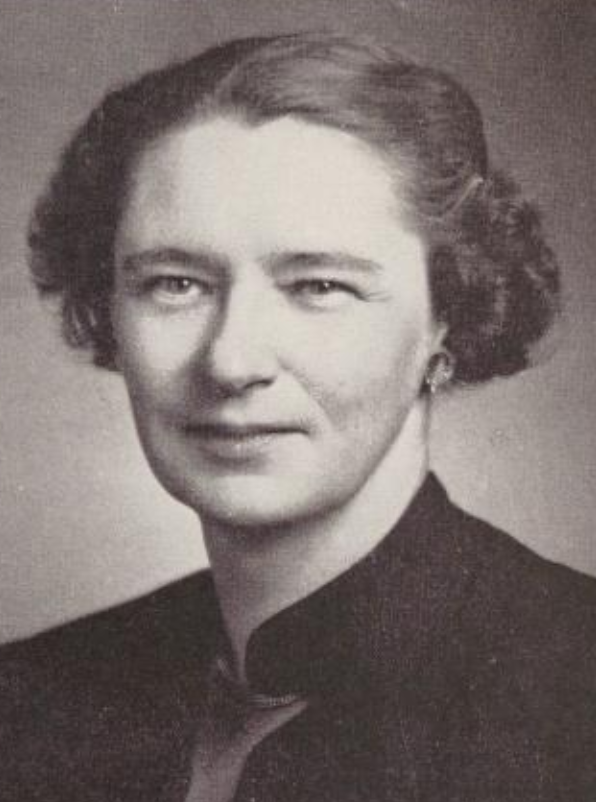
- Meribeth E. Cameron, from the 1947 yearbook of Milwaukee-Downer College

13th President of Mount Holyoke College (Acting)
- In office 1968–1969
- Preceded by: Richard Glenn Gettell
- Succeeded by: David Truman

Personal details
- Born: May 22, 1905 Ingersoll, Ontario, Canada
- Died: July 12, 1997 (aged 92) South Hadley, Massachusetts, U.S.
- Education: Stanford University; Radcliffe College
- Profession: Professor

Meribeth Elliott Cameron (May 22, 1905 – July 12, 1997) was an American sinologist, historian of China and academic who served as the 13th (Acting) President of Mount Holyoke College from 1968-69.

She was a professor of Chinese History at Mount Holyoke from 1948-1970. She served as Dean and briefly as Acting President in 1954 (during the period of President Ham) and 1966 (during the period of President Gettell).

== Academic training and career ==
Cameron graduated from Santa Monica High School in Santa Monica, California, in 1921 and was awarded a B.A. from Stanford University in 1925 and an M.A. in 1926. While at Stanford she was a member of Phi Beta Kappa and studied the history of East Asia. She took a M.A. degree in history at Radcliffe College in 1927, then returned to Stanford to finish her dissertation, "The Reform Movement in China, 1898-1912", for which she was awarded a Ph.D. in History and Political Science in 1928.

She then taught at Reed College (1928-1934), Flora Stone Mather College of Western Reserve University (1934-1937). She was Dean of the College and Professor of history at Milwaukee-Downer College (1941-1948), and in 1948 Academic Dean and Professor of history at Mount Holyoke College, where she remained until she retired in 1970.

During these years she was a productive historian of China. She was one of the founding editors of Far Eastern Quarterly (later called The Journal of Asian Studies), of which she was book review editor 1941-51. She contributed to the basic reference for Qing dynasty history, Eminent Chinese of the Ch'ing Period (1943). Among her journal articles and books were The Reform Movement in China, 1898-1912 and a co-authored book, China, Japan and the Powers.

== Selected works ==
- ——— (1926). The Shantung Negotiations at the Versailles, Washington, and Peking Conferences. History (Master's thesis). Stanford University.
- ——— (1931). The Reform Movement in China 1893-1912. Stanford, London: Stanford University Press.
- ——— (1950). The United States and Eastern Asia, a Study Guide. Washington: American Association of University Women.
- ——— (1952). China, Japan and the Powers. New York: Ronald Press.
