= American Association of Colleges and Universities =

American industry group

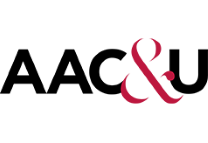
- Logo of AAC&U

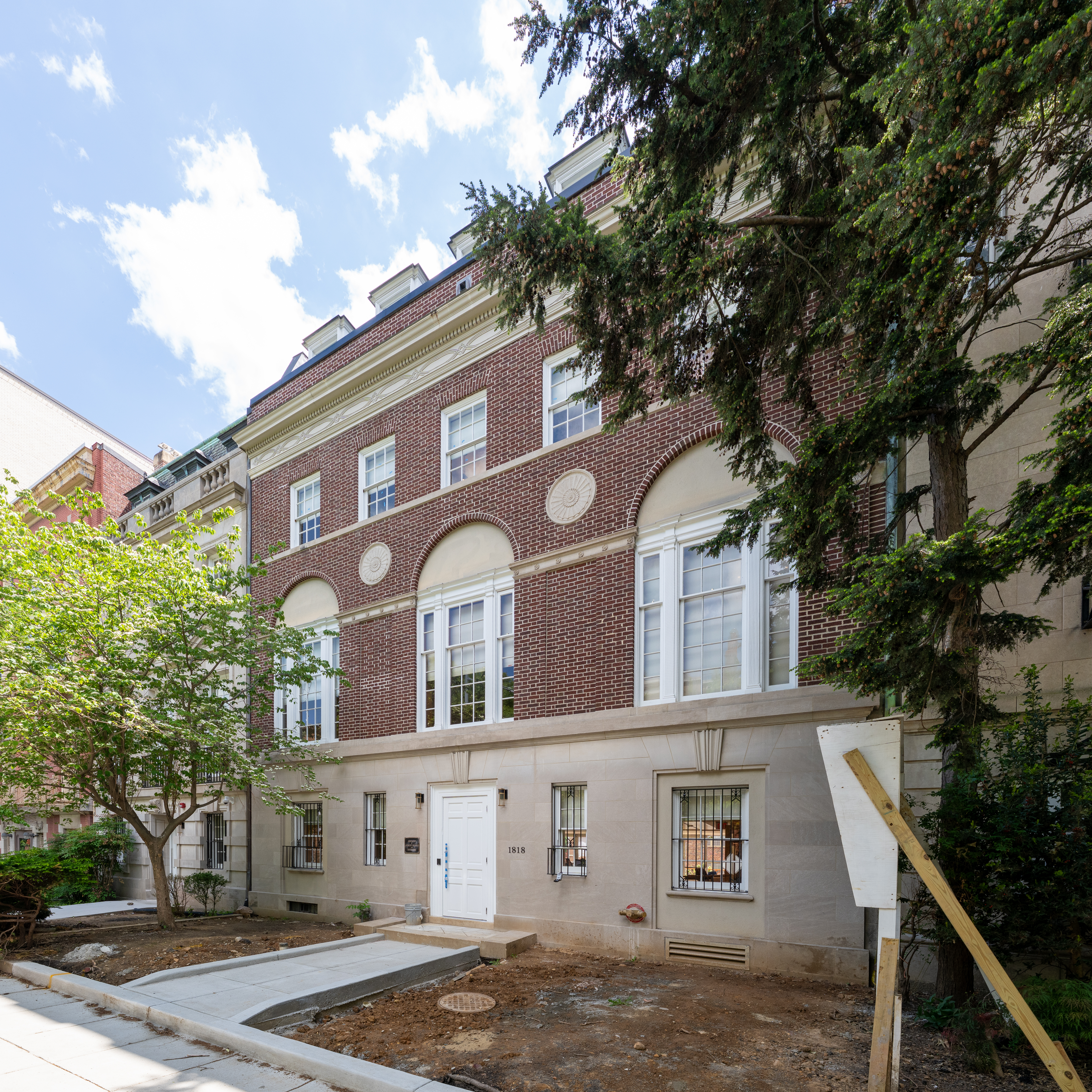
- Headquarters in Washington D.C.
- Formation: 1915; 111 years ago
- Type: Non-profit organization
- Purpose: Improving undergraduate education and advancing liberal education
- Headquarters: 1818 R Street NW, Washington, D.C., U.S.
- Members: 1000 institutions
- President: Lynn Pasquerella
- Main organ: Liberal Education
- Website: www.aacu.org
- Formerly called: Association of American Colleges (1915–1995); Association of American Colleges and Universities (1995–2022)

The American Association of Colleges and Universities (AAC&U) is a global membership organization headquartered in Washington, D.C., United States. It works to improve quality and equity in undergraduate education and advance liberal education.

Founded in 1915 as the Association of American Colleges, AAC&U comprises more than 1,000 member institutions in the US and abroad, including accredited public and private colleges, community colleges, research universities, and comprehensive universities. It was renamed the Association of American Colleges and Universities in 1995, and acquired its current name in 2022.

== History ==
The organization was founded in Chicago in 1915.

In 1976, it ended its role in federal lobbying and spun-off this work to the newly created National Association of Independent Colleges and Universities. Today, it focuses on "advancing the vitality and democratic purposes of undergraduate liberal education" and hosts conferences, workshops and an annual meeting.

== Publications ==
AAC&U publishes Liberal Education magazine, sponsors meetings and institutes for campus teams and publishes reports and monographs.

Peer Review was a quarterly magazine published by the association from 2000 to fall 2019 that reported "emerging trends and key debates in undergraduate liberal education".

== The Multi-State Collaborative to Advance Quality Student Learning ==
The Multi-State Collaborative to Advance Quality Student Learning was a collaboration led by the AAC&U and the state higher education executive officers from approximately 2014 to 2018. As of October 2016, the project involved 900 faculty members at 80 public two- and four-year institutions in 13 states. The project aimed to produce a cross-institutional method of evaluating student learning by getting faculty from different institutions to agree on a set of general education outcomes by using a common rubric, the AAC&U Value Rubrics, for evaluating student work. The leaders of the collaboration hoped that the results of the project would "paint an accurate picture of learning nationwide and, in turn, spark continuing improvement. The notability of the project is its "subject of analysis: the authentic stuff of college – the homework, problem sets, and papers that students regularly produce."
