= Hannah Lyman =

American educator; first Lady Principal of Vassar College (1816–1871)

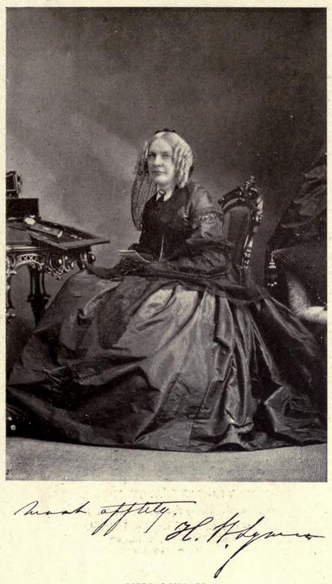
- Born: Hannah Willard Lyman; 1816; Northampton, Massachusetts, US
- Died: February 21, 1871 (aged 54–55); Poughkeepsie, New York, US
- Resting place: Mount Royal Cemetery, Montreal, Canada
- Education: Ipswich Female Seminary
- Occupation: Lady Principal of Vassar College
- Relatives: Henry Lyman (brother)
- Writing career
- Notable work: The Martyr of Sumatra: A Memoir of Henry Lyman

Hannah Willard Lyman (1816 – February 21, 1871) was an American educator. She was the first woman principal of Vassar College. Lyman took an active interest in missionary operations through her whole life, maintained a constant correspondence with several distinguished Christian missionaries in foreign lands, and did much by the power of her enthusiasm to kindle and foster the missionary spirit, not only among her pupils, but in the wide circle of social influence which she filled for many years. In Montreal, she began a class for young women which quickly grew into a seminary, which she ran for 22 years. Her reputation as a successful and inspiring teacher had been so widespread that she received frequent invitations to take the superintendence of large public educational institutions, which she always declined. In 1865, however, she received an urgent request to become principal of a newly organized woman's college on a very large scale -Vassar College, Poughkeepsie, New York- an institution founded on a munificent bequest, with aims and resources greater than perhaps any other such institution in the world.

== Early life and education ==
Hannah Willard Lyman was born in Northampton, Massachusetts, in 1816. She was of Puritan ancestry. Along with the Edwardses, the Stoddards, the Strongs, and others, the Lymans were members of old families who originally settled that region. Her parents were Theodore Lyman and Susan Willard Whitney. She was a sister of Henry Lyman, the missionary, who, with his colleague, Samuel Munson, was murdered in Sumatra. His martyrdom made a deep impression on her, as was evinced in the biography of him which she wrote years after. Other brothers included Theodore Lyman and S. J. Lyman.

Lyman's advantages of early education were the best that New England afforded for her gender. While she was yet a child, her parents removed to Amherst, Massachusetts, where she grew up amid the intellectual and social influences characteristic of a New England college town, and formed numerous acquaintances with educated and professional people, that were of immense value to her in subsequent life.

At the Ipswich Female Seminary, she was associated with various instructors including Mrs. Girard, sister of the historian George Bancroft, and with Zilpah P. Grant Banister, the school's principal, with whom Mary Lyon, the founder of Mount Holyoke College, was at that time a co-worker.

== Career ==
Lyman began to teach at a very early age, filling subordinate positions successfully at Gorham Academy, Maine; in Massachusetts; and at Mrs. Gray's Seminary for Ladies in Petersburg, Virginia.

=== Montreal ===
In 1839, she went to Montreal, where several members of her family were then settled, and opened a select school for young women on an independent basis. The enthusiasm of her nature, her intelligence, her exalted ideal of feminine culture, and her talent (amounting almost to genius) for the profession to which she had devoted herself, made this enterprise a success from the beginning. Her school soon gained the confidence of the public, till it drew its pupils from all parts of Canada and the northern and eastern U.S.

While a resident of Montreal, she was recognized as a most active member of the Christian church, and an influential promoter of movement for the intellectual as well as the moral and religious benefit of the community. For a long time, she met a large class of British soldiers, who came weekly to her parlors for Bible instruction. Many of them became Christians. Lyman's Christianity was of a definite orthodox type, pronounced and aggressive, though tempered by a naturally genial spirit, and catholic on principle toward those who differed from her on points she deemed unessential. With such convictions, she could not fail to give a prominent place in her system to the religious training of her pupils. Very many of them became Christians under her influence.

In the summer and fall of 1863, Lyman visited Europe, where she formed many valuable acquaintances among educators and clergymen, especially in England, and studied the methods of female education, in many respects inferior to our own.

=== Vassar College ===
She continued the school in Montreal until 1865, when, at the age of 49, she was summoned back to the U.S. to aid in the organization and direction of Vassar, a college for women, whose aims were, in some respects, higher than those of any similar institution in the world. She brought to it no ordinary qualifications. She was in the full maturity of her abilities, skills, and knowledge. Her New England training, her knowledge of college life, her extensive acquaintance with educationists at home and abroad, her familiarity with the critical questions then under discussion respecting woman's education, her varied observation of men and manners, and her life-long experience in the management of the young, all made her counsel invaluable in the moulding of this institution.

The direction of the whole domestic life of the college, and the supervision of the personal interests of its students; the care of their health, the cultivation of their manners, their moral and spiritual welfare-in a word, the maternal care of a family of more than three hundred and fifty young women, with their thirty resident teachers, devolved immediately on her; and though she had able supporters in the resident physician of the college, and other faithful associates, her office as responsible head of the system was no sinecure.

== Death and legacy ==
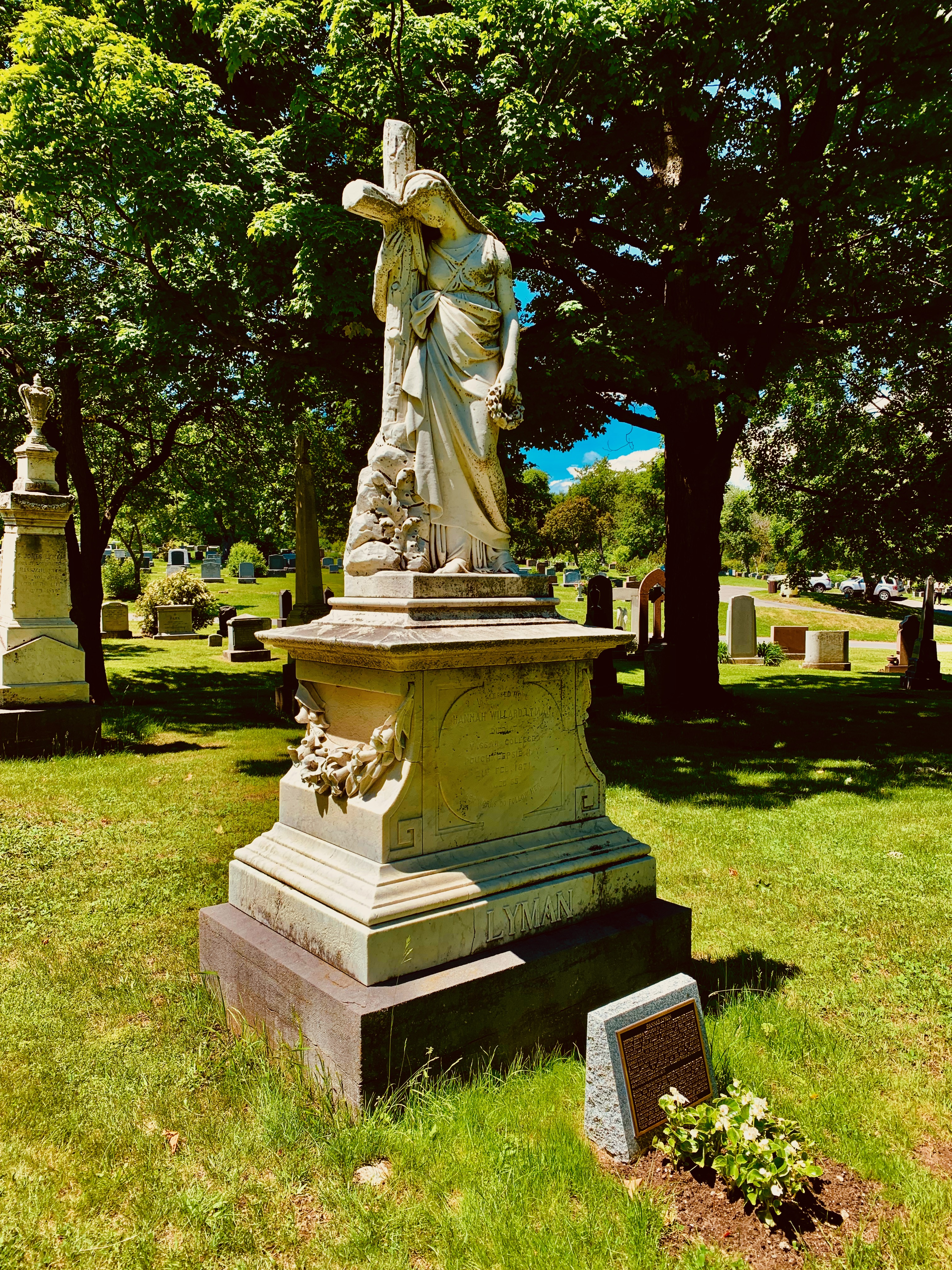
Funeral monument of Hannah Lyman at Mount Royal Cemetery(Montreal, Québec, Canada)

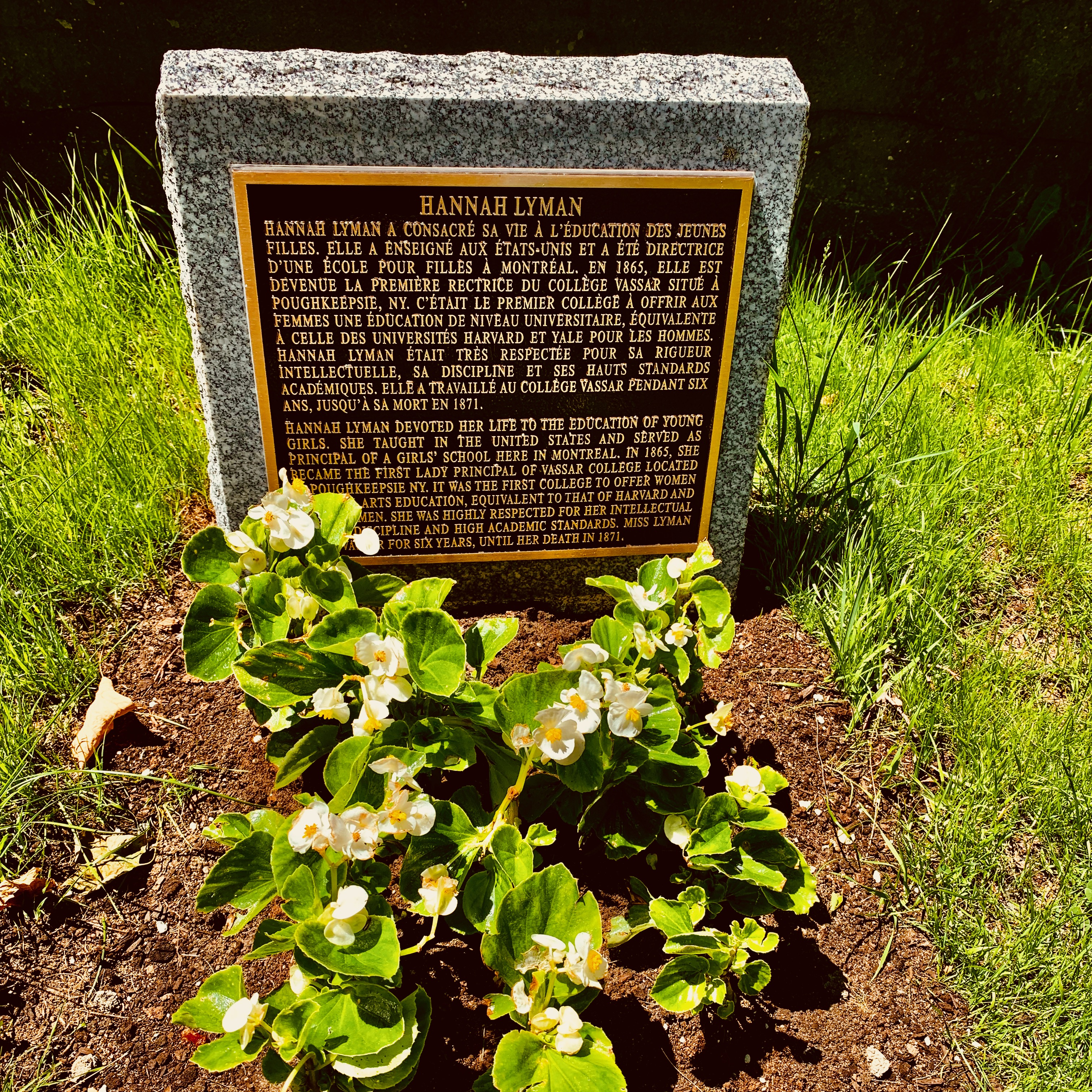
Hannah Lyman commemorative plaque at Mount Royal Cemetery (Montreal, Québec, Canada).

Lyman never married. Delicate in health, she suffered a long and painful struggle at the end of her life. Remaining at Vassar to the last, she died of tuberculosis at Poughkeepsie, February 21, 1871. After services in the chapel of the college, her remains were conveyed to Montreal for burial at Mount Royal Cemetery, where a monument was erected.

In 1880, a memorial in her honor was preserved in McGill University by the "Hannah Willard Lyman Fund", raised by subscriptions from her former pupils, and invested as a permanent endowment to furnish annually a scholarship or prizes in a college for women affiliated to the university, or in classes for the higher education of women.

== Selected works ==
- The Martyr of Sumatra: A Memoir of Henry Lyman, 1856
- To the parents of students , 1867
