= Louise Manning Hodgkins =

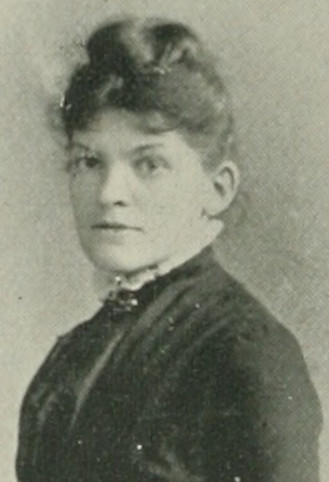
- Photo in A Woman of the Century
- Born: August 5, 1846; Ipswich, Massachusetts, U.S.
- Died: November 28, 1935 (aged 89); East Northfield, Massachusetts
- Resting place: Woodland Dell Cemetery, Wilbraham
- Education: Ipswich Female Seminary, Pennington Seminary, Wilbraham Wesleyan Academy, Lawrence College
- Occupations: educator; author; editor

Louise Manning Hodgkins (August 5, 1846 – November 28, 1935) was an American educator, author, and editor from Massachusetts. After completing her studies at Pennington Seminary and Wilbraham Wesleyan Academy, she became a teacher and preceptress at Lawrence College, before receiving a Master of Arts degree from that institution in 1876. She taught at Wellesley College for over a decade before turning her attentions to writing and editing. Her main works included Nineteenth Century Authors of Great Britain and the United States, Study of the English Language, and Via Christi. She served as editor of The Heathen Woman's Friend, the first organ of the Woman's Foreign Missionary Society of the Methodist Episcopal Church, and also edited Milton lyrics : L'allegro, Il penseroso, Comus, and Lycidas and Matthew Arnold's Sohrab and Rustum. She died in 1935.

== Early life and education ==
Louise Manning Hodgkins was born in Ipswich, Massachusetts, August 5, 1846, the daughter of Daniel Lummus and Mary (Willett) Hodgkins. She was descended from a line of soldiers reaching back to American Revolutionary War times. Her education was begun in the Ipswich Female Seminary under Mrs. Eunice P. Cowles, continued in Pennington Seminary, New Jersey, and in Wilbraham Wesleyan Academy, Wilbraham, Massachusetts where she was graduated in 1870. In addition to the usual curriculum, she had given much extra attention to the French language, and had become proficient in music. In 1876, she received the degree of Master of Arts, from Lawrence College, Appleton, Wisconsin, where she had also been engaged as a teacher and preceptress.

== Career ==
Immediately after her graduation from Wilbraham, Hodgkins accepted the position of second lady teacher in Lawrence University. She began her services in the fall term of 1870, giving instruction in English branches in addition to French language and botany. Having early on shown aptitude and skill as an instructor, after four years in this position, she was, in 1874, on the resignation of Miss Evans, elected Preceptress. With a somewhat higher range of work and large responsibilities in the way of government, she showed increasing competence and skill. In 1876, she was elected professor of English literature in Wellesley College, with leave of absence abroad for study, returning to her position in the following year. Beginning in 1877, she served as professor of English literature at Wellesley College, arranging a course of study in her department suited to the needs of the times. She remained till June, 1891, making two visits to Europe during these years. The resignation so that she could concentrate on literary work. This included editing John Milton's Lyrics and Matthew Arnold's Sohrab and Rustum.

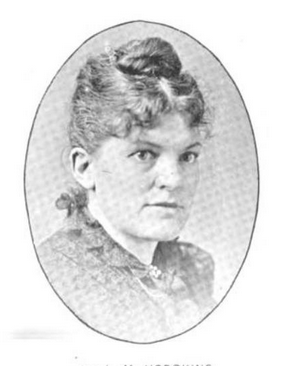
Hodgkins in History of the Wesleyan Academy (1893)

Although well known as a teacher, Prof. Hodgkins was called the "Poet-Professor" in Wellesley. During her term of service, she contributed poems, stories and educational articles to magazines and periodicals. Her chief service to literature was associated closely with her work and is known under the title of A Guide to the Study of Nineteenth Century Literature; there were also three books in the "English Classics" series. Among the books she authored are, Nineteenth Century Authors of Great Britain and the United States, Study of the English Language, and Via Christi.

Via Christi (Macmillan, October, 1902) was a volume of missionary annals, which in less than two years reached a sale of nearly 50,000 copies. During the Ecumenical Missionary Conference, held in New York, April 21-May 1, 1900, a long-contemplated plan to unite all Women's Boards of Missions in the United States and Canada in a more thorough study of missions had taken shape. At a meeting held at the close of the conference, a representative committee was appointed, and was given discretionary power to arrange the course of study and provide the method to pursue it. Via Christi, an Introduction to the Study of Missions, was the first of a series proposed by the committee, to be followed by studies of India, China, Japan, and other countries, each volume treating of the history of all missions in the country to which it was devoted, and beginning, in each case, with the 19th century. William Fairfield Warren, President Boston University, said of it, "Via Christi shows scholarly estimate of the value and enjoyableness of historic sources, as contrasted with rhetorical elaboration merely suggested by the sources. Though but a little US$0.50 volume, it would be hard to find in any book three times its size an equal number of prayers, hymns, and striking appeals, written by the great historic representatives of the missionary spirit themselves." The Christian Endeavor World remarked, "One of the results of the Ecumenical Missionary Conference of 1900 was the uniting of all the Women's Missionary Boards in the United States and Canada for the publication of a thorough and complete course of a study of missions. The initial volume is entitled Via Christi, and is by a most competent and attractive writer, Miss Louise Manning Hodgkins. In six chapters the reader is conducted through the vast course of history, extending from the days of Paul to those of Carey and Judson. The author has not made the mistake of putting in so much that the charm and vividness of the narrative are crowded out. One of the most attractive features of the volume is the set of selections from the period under review at the close of each chapter and the effectively arranged chronological tables." The New York Tribune also reviewed the book, stating, Via Christi gives a bird's-eye view of the missionary efforts of the world from the time of Paul to the nineteenth century. Contemporaneous events in the secular world are mentioned, with names of prominent people and places of the period, giving a perspective as satisfying as it is unusual."

Unanimously selected by the Woman's Foreign Missionary Society of the Methodist Episcopal Church, Hodgkins was Harriet Merrick Warren's successor in the editorial chair of The Heathen Woman's Friend. To that publication, Hodgkins was said to have "given a fresh impetus on many lines, and it is not surprising that its subscription list lengthens each year." She urged that a more prominent place should be given to missionary magazines in the family, and among the standard periodicals of the day; that they should be seen on the news stands, and on home tables, and that there should be earnest personal effort to increase their circulation. She stated that missionary literature ought to attract us and become a part of our culture, because "the proper study of mankind is man." No shelf of books omitting could compare with one containing the following missionary classics: Dr. Griffith's Mikado Empire, Dr. Butler's Land of the Veda, Dr. Lansdell's Central China, Bishop Thoburn's India and Malaysia, Dr. S. Wells Williams' Middle Kingdom, Miss Ficlde's Pagoda Shadows and a Corner in Cathay, Dr. Nevius' China and the Chinese, Miss Bacon's Japanese Girls and Women, Isabella Bird's (Mrs. Bishop) Unbeaten Tracks in Japan, J. F. Clarke's Great Religions of the World, with this generous dozen of biographies and autobiographies added: The lives of Livingstone, Hamlin, Bishop Ilannington, the .MofTatts, William Carey, Alexander Duff, John G. Paton, Bishop Patteson. Xeesima, General Gordon, Harriet Newell, the Mrs. Judsons, Fidelia Fiske, and Henry Martyn.

== Personal life ==
Hodgkins visited Europe four times for special studies, attending lectures at the College Francais in Paris, studying in the Girls' Normal School at Hanover, and with private tutors in Leipzig and Berlin, also in the University of Oxford. She resided in Auburndale, Massachusetts. Hodgkins died in East Northfield, Massachusetts, November 28, 1935, and is buried at Woodland Dell Cemetery in Wilbraham.

== Selected works ==
- 1884, Three Marys : three interpretations of Mark 16:15
- 1887, Byron
- 1887, Shelley
- 1887, Macaulay
- 1887, Robert Browning
- 1887, Charles Dickens
- 1887, Wordsworth
- 1887, Mrs. Browning
- 1887, Coleridge
- 1887, Scott
- 1887, Thackeray
- 1887, Lamb
- 1888, Lowell
- 1888, Whittier
- 1888, Longfellow
- 1888, Carlyle
- 1888, Irving
- 1888, Tennyson
- 1888, Holmes
- 1888, Eliot
- 1888, Bryant
- 1888, Hawthorne
- 1889, Ruskin
- 1889, Arnold
- 1889, Webster's First Bunker-Hill Oration
- 1890, A Guide to the study of nineteenth century authors
- 1896, The roll call : an introduction to our missionaries, 1869-1896
- 1902, Via Christi : an introduction to the study of missions
