= Women's college =

Undergraduate college consisting entirely or predominantly of women

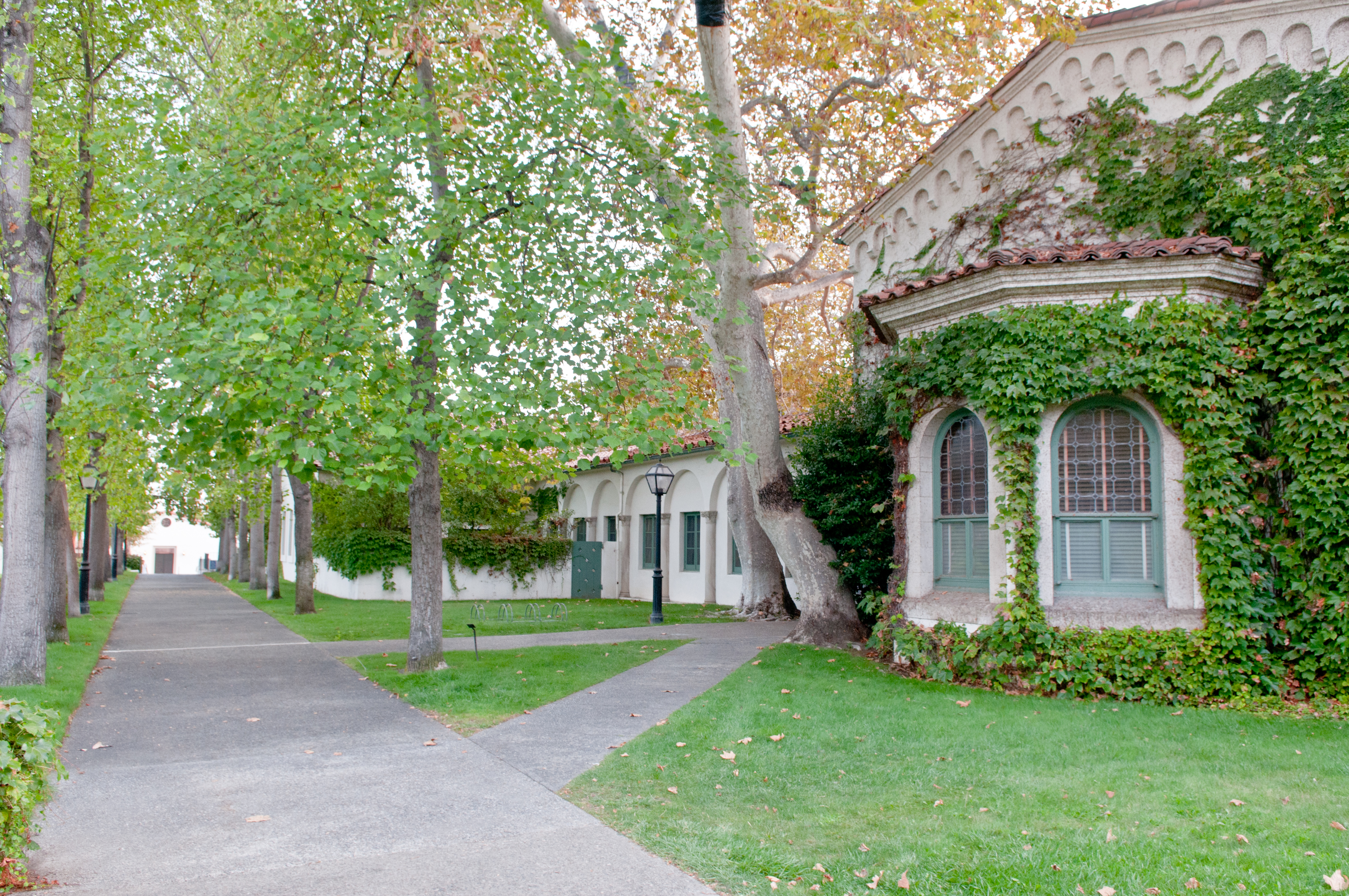
Scripps College, a women's college in Claremont, California, United States.

Women's colleges in higher education are undergraduate, bachelor's degree-granting institutions, often liberal arts colleges, whose student populations are composed exclusively or almost exclusively of women. Some women's colleges admit male students to their graduate schools or in smaller numbers to undergraduate programs, but all serve a primarily female student body.

== Distinction from finishing school ==
A women's college offers an academic curriculum exclusively or primarily, while a girls' or women's finishing school (sometimes called a charm school) focuses on social graces such as deportment, etiquette, and entertaining; academics if offered are secondary.

The term finishing school has sometimes been used or misused to describe certain women's colleges. Some of these colleges may have started as finishing schools but transformed themselves into rigorous liberal arts academic institutions, as for instance the now defunct Finch College. Likewise the secondary school Miss Porter's School was founded as Miss Porter's Finishing School for Young Ladies in 1843; now it emphasizes an academic curriculum.

A women's college that had never described itself as a finishing school can acquire the misnomer. Throughout the 114-year history of the women's college Sweet Briar, students and alumnae have objected to calling it a finishing school. Nonetheless the finishing school characterization persisted, and may have contributed to declining enrollment, financial straits, and the school's near closure in 2015.

== Declining number ==
The continuing relevance of women's colleges has been questioned. While during the 1960s there were 240 women's colleges in the U.S., only about 40 remain as of 2015. In the words of a teacher at Radcliffe (a women's college that merged with Harvard): "[i]f women’s colleges become unnecessary, if women’s colleges become irrelevant, then that’s a sign of our [women's] success."

== Africa ==
=== Somaliland ===
- Barwaaqo University, Baliga Cas (estd. 2017)

=== Sudan ===
- Ahfad University for Women

== Asia ==
- Asian University for Women, Chittagong, Bangladesh (estd. 2008)
- Jyoti Nivas College, Bangalore, India, Karnataka, Bengaluru (estd. 1966)
- Bethune College, the first women's college in South Asia (estd. 1879)
- Govt. Begum Rokeya College, Rangpur, Bangladesh (estd. 1963)
- Indraprastha College for Women, Delhi (estd. 1924)
- Jinnah University for Women, Karachi, Pakistan (estd. 1998)
- Keisen University in Japan (estd. 1988)
- Lady Irwin College, New Delhi (estd. 1932)
- Lahore College for Women University, Lahore (estd. 1922)
- Kinnaird College for Women, Lahore (est. 1913)
- Miranda House, New Delhi (estd. 1948)
- Women's College, Aligarh, India (estd. 1906)

=== Philippines ===
- Assumption College San Lorenzo, Makati City (estd. 1959)
- Miriam College in Quezon City (estd. 1926)
- Philippine Women's University, the first women's university in the Philippines and Asia (estd. 1919)
- St. Paul University Manila (estd. 1912)
- St. Scholastica's College Manila (estd. 1906)

=== South Korea ===
- Duksung Women's University in Seoul, South Korea. (estd. 1920)
- Dongduk Women's University in Seoul, South Korea. (estd. 1950)
- Ewha Womans University in Seoul, South Korea. (estd. 1886)
- Seoul Women's University in Seoul, South Korea (estd. 1961)
- Sookmyung Women's University in Seoul, South Korea (estd. 1906)
- Sungshin Women's University in Seoul, South Korea. (estd. 1936)

== Canada ==
Brescia University College was Canada's only university-level women's educational institution until it merged with Western University in 2024.

Mount Saint Vincent University in Halifax, Nova Scotia was originally founded as a women's college in 1875, but became co-educational in 1967.

== Middle East ==
=== Kingdom of Bahrain ===
- Royal University for Women

=== United Arab Emirates ===
- Dubai Women's College

=== Kuwait ===
- Box Hill College Kuwait
- College for Women, a separate faculty at Kuwait University

=== Kingdom of Saudi Arabia ===
Most major universities in Kingdom of Saudi Arabia are composed of two branches: a women-only branch and a similar male-only branch. This includes the following universities:

- King Saud University
- Al-Imam University
- King Abdulaziz University
- King Faisal University
- Prince Sultan University

The following are female-only institutions:

- Effat University
- Princess Noura University

=== Iran ===
- Alzahra University, Tehran

== United Kingdom ==
Mary Astell advocated the idea that women were just as rational as men, and just as deserving of education. First published in 1694, her Serious Proposal to the Ladies for the Advancement of their True and Greatest Interest presents a plan for an all-female college where women could pursue a life of the mind. The first college to partially realise Astell's plan was Whitelands College, a women's teacher training college opened in 1841 by the Church of England's National Society and since 2004 part of the University of Roehampton. Whitelands was followed by two colleges in London, Queen's College in 1848 and Bedford College in 1849. Queen's College developed into a girls' public school and Bedford College became part of the University of London before merging with another women's college. The first of the Cambridge women's colleges, Girton, which opened in 1869 initially in Hitchin, claims to be the first residential college in Britain to offer degree level education to women. Somerville and Lady Margaret Hall in Oxford opened in 1879.

Existing women's colleges:

- Murray Edwards College, Cambridge (established 1954, formerly New Hall)
- Newnham College, Cambridge (established 1871)

Former women's colleges:

Former women's colleges in UK
College	Established	Became co-educational
Bedford College, London	1849	1965
Bishop Otter College, now University of Chichester	1873	1957
Digby Stuart College, Roehampton University	1874	1971
Froebel College, Roehampton University	1892	1965
Girton College, Cambridge	1869	1976
Hughes Hall, Cambridge	1885	1973
Lady Margaret Hall, Oxford	1878	1979
Lucy Cavendish College, Cambridge	1965	2020
Royal Holloway, University of London	1879	1965
St Aidan's College, Durham	1947	1981
St Anne's College, Oxford	1879	1979
St Hild's College, Durham (merged to form co-educational college)	1858	1975
St Hilda's College, Oxford	1893	2008
St Hugh's College, Oxford	1886	1986
St Mary's College, Durham	1899	2005
Somerville College, Oxford	1879	1994
Southlands College, Roehampton University	1872	1965
Trevelyan College, Durham	1966	1992
Westfield College, London	1882	1964
Whitelands College, Roehampton University	1841	1965

== United States ==
=== Early history ===
Women's colleges in the United States were a product of the increasingly popular private girls' secondary schools of the early- to mid-19th century, called "academies" or "seminaries." According to Irene Harwarth, et al., "women's colleges were founded during the mid- and late-19th century in response to a need for advanced education for women at a time when they were not admitted to most institutions of higher education." While there were a few coeducational colleges (such as Oberlin College founded in 1833, Lawrence University in 1847, Antioch College in 1853, and Bates College in 1855), most colleges and universities of high standing at that time were exclusively for men.

Critics of the girls’ seminaries were roughly divided into two groups. The reform group, including Emma Willard, felt seminaries required reform through “strengthening teaching of the core academic subjects.” Others felt seminaries were insufficient, suggesting “a more durable institution--a women’s college--be founded, among them, Catharine E. Beecher. In her True Remedy for the Wrongs of Women (1851), Beecher points out how “seminaries could not offer sufficient, permanent endowments, buildings, and libraries; a corporation whose duty it is to perpetuate the institution on a given plan.”

Another notable figure was Mary Lyon (1797-1849), founder of Mount Holyoke College, whose contemporaries included Sarah Pierce (Litchfield Female Academy, 1792); Catharine Beecher (Hartford Female Seminary, 1823); Zilpah P. Grant Banister (Ipswich Female Seminary, 1828); George Washington Doane (St. Mary's Hall, 1837 now called Doane Academy). Prior to founding Mount Holyoke, Lyon contributed to the development of both Hartford Female Seminary and Ipswich Female Seminary. She was also involved in the creation of Wheaton Female Seminary (now Wheaton College, Massachusetts) in 1834.

=== Women's College Coalition ===
The Women's College Coalition is an association of women's colleges and universities (with some observers/participants from the single-sex secondary/high schools) that are either two- and four-year, both public and private, religiously-affiliated and secular. It was founded in 1972, at a time in which the "Civil Rights Movement", the "Women's Rights Movement", and Title IX, as well as demographic and technological changes in the 1960s brought about rapid and complex social and economic change in the United States. These societal changes put increasing pressure of perceived "unpopularity" and "old fashioned" perceptions and opinions placing the concept of "single-sex education" for both women and men on the most drastic downward spiral in its history. Additionally, the landscape of education dramatically changed as many previously all-male high schools (both private/independent and public) along with the colleges, many of which were either forced by official actions or declining attendance figures to become coeducational, thereby offering women many more educational options. At the same time with the similar changes forced on women's institutions, both private and public secondary schools along with the colleges/universities, forced a number of the larger number of girls schools to also coeducate. By the late 1970s, women's enrollment in college exceeded the men's and, in the 2020s, women make up the majority of undergraduates (57% nationally) on college/university campuses. Women earn better college grades than men do, and are more likely than men to complete college.

During the past several decades, the Women's College Coalition engaged in research about the benefits of a women's high school and/or college education in the 21st century. Drawing upon the findings of research conducted by the National Survey of Student Engagement (NSSE) and Hardwick-Day on levels of satisfaction among students and alumnae at women's colleges and coeducational institutions, as well as the Association of American Colleges and Universities, NAICU and others, the Coalition makes the case for women's education and women's high schools and colleges to prospective students, families, policy and opinion makers, the media, employers and the general public.

=== Women's colleges and universities in North America ===
- Agnes Scott College
- Alverno College
- Barnard College
- Bay Path University
- Bennett College for Women
- Brenau University
- Brescia University College
- Bryn Mawr College
- Cedar Crest College
- College of Saint Benedict
- Cottey College
- Douglass Residential College of Rutgers University, (the State University of New Jersey)
- Hollins University
- Mary Baldwin University
- Meredith College
- Moore College of Art and Design
- Mount Holyoke College
- Mount Mary University
- Mount St. Mary's College
- Notre Dame of Maryland University, (formerly College of Notre Dame of Maryland)
- St. Catherine University
- Saint Mary's College (Indiana)
- Salem College
- Scripps College
- Simmons University
- Smith College
- Spelman College
- Stephens College
- Sweet Briar College
- Trinity Washington University
- Ursuline College
- Wellesley College
- Wesleyan College
- Wheaton College (Massachusetts)
- The Women's College of the University of Denver

== See also ==
- Higher education in the United States
- History of higher education in the United States
- Female education
- Men's college
- Men's colleges in the United States
- Mixed-sex education
- Single-sex education
