= Mary Cummings =

American philanthropist (1839–1927)

A young Mary Cummings

Mary Phelps Cowles (Hall) Cummings (August 5, 1839 in Elyria, Ohio – December 23, 1927 in Woburn, Massachusetts) was a late 19th-century and early 20th-century philanthropist. She was highly educated for her time and among her family, husbands and their friends were prominent figures of the day.

== Early life and education ==
Mary was the eldest child of Reverend John P. Cowles and Eunice Caldwell Cowles. John was an abolitionist and a professor of Greek, Latin, Syriac, French, German, and Italian. at Oberlin College shortly after its founding, from 1835 until he had a falling out with the President over the theory of Christian Perfection five years later. Eunice was from an old Ipswich, Massachusetts family and was educated at the original Ipswich Female Seminary. She was the first principal of Wheaton Female Seminary, now Wheaton College. She was also the Associate Principal at Mount Holyoke Female Seminary (now Mount Holyoke College) at its founding by Mary Lyon.

It appears she had two sisters and two brothers. Roxana Caldwell Cowles born in 1841 also in Elyria, Ohio. When Roxana died and left Mary money, Mary created a scholarship for Ipswich girls. John Phelps Cowles Jr was born in Oberlin, Ohio, in 1844. He married Sigourney Trask in Fuzhou, China on January 6, 1885, and disappeared in Nicaragua on his final return trip from China to Massachusetts in 1893. Sigourney asked for help from the State Dept. to locate John, but no trace of him was found. His children were in Mary’s will: “Henry T. Cowles of Porto Rico” (born in 1887 in Dover, Massachusetts and died in 1976 in Wellesley) and “Eunice Cowles Cooper of Barcroft, Virginia” (born 1885. She was deaf per a letter of her mother to Alexander Graham Bell.). Henry Augustine Cowles was born in 1846 in Ipswich and died a soldier in the Civil War in 1864. Susan was born in 1848 in Ipswich.

In 1844, Mary and her family moved to Ipswich, Massachusetts, to reopen the Ipswich Female Academy upon the request of the town. She was educated at the Academy which was run by her parents until they closed it in 1876. Because her parents followed Lyon's philosophy of an academically rigorous education for girls, Mary received the equivalent of a college education. A history of the town describes her as the "brilliant daughter".

== Career ==
From 1859 through 1862, Mary taught at Abbot Academy (founded in 1829 as the first school for girls in New England and merged with Phillips Academy in 1973) in Andover.

On November 21, 1864, Mary married Dr. Adino Brackett Hall, a prominent Boston physician who was also an active member of the Boston School Board and councilor in the Massachusetts Medical Society. During the Civil War, Dr. Hall had served as a volunteer surgeon in McClellan's Army. They lived in Boston until Dr. Hall died in 1880. Later, in 1885, Mary would donate the funds to build a library in her late husband's name, located in Dr. Hall's original hometown of Northfield, New Hampshire.

On September 1, 1881, Mary Cummings married John Cummings, from a prominent Woburn family who owned so much land in the area it was called "Cummingsville". He owned a tannery and a farm which lay partly in Woburn and the larger part in neighboring Burlington. He had many ties to Boston, including his job as president of the Shawmut Bank of Boston for nearly thirty years and as one of the founders of the Massachusetts Institute of Technology (MIT) and its treasurer from 1872 to 1889. John Cummings also served in the Massachusetts House of Representatives and Massachusetts Senate representing Woburn. Besides being credited with saving MIT with his personal funds, his philanthropy also included providing land for a fire station in Woburn and donating his natural history specimen collection to the Woburn Public Library. After John died in 1898, Mary remained in their mansion and maintained the farm while traveling abroad.

== Death and legacy ==
Will of Mary Cummings

Mary Cummings died on December 23, 1927, leaving her 236-acre (0.96 km^{2}) farm in trust to the City of Boston for use as a recreational park for the public, now known as Mary Cummings Park. Along with the land, she left a substantial maintenance and care trust fund to be supported by income from an office building next to Faneuil Hall in downtown Boston.

She was inspired by the park and playground movements that swept the country during the late 19th and early 20th century. In fact, Mary made the Playground and Recreation Association of America (later renamed the National Recreation and Park Association) as the alternate trustee in case Boston decided not to accept the terms of her trust. Joseph Lee, a son of another Boston banker and a contemporary of her later years, was the President of the PRAA for many years and considered the "Father of the Playground Movement". Mary also donated 6 acres (24,000 m^{2}) for a playground in Woburn, later renamed Gonsalves Park.

Mary entrusted the park to the City of Boston, according to friends who were quoted in the newspaper after her death, because she believed that a Greater Boston would formally incorporate its suburbs just as New York City had incorporated the surrounding towns as boroughs and other American cities had followed a similar model. Boston had already incorporated several formerly adjacent towns such as Roxbury, Dorchester, Brighton and Hyde Park.

Although she specified the City of Boston as the trustee, the "public" are the beneficiaries. She had a vision for her park that it was to be enjoyed by all.
