= Sigourney Trask =

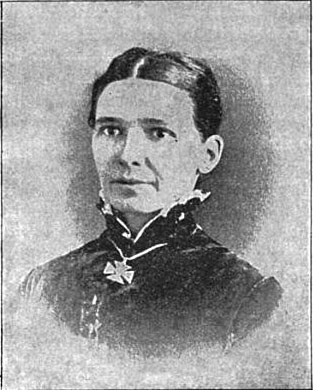
Sigourney Trask

Sigourney Trask (June 14, 1849 - March 20, 1936) was an American physician and missionary. She is remembered as being the first woman physician at Fuzhou, China sent by the Methodist Episcopal Church missionaries.

== Biography ==
Trask was born June 14, 1849, in Spring Creek, Pennsylvania. Her mother died while Trask was young, and thereafter, she was raised by her paternal grandparents, who resided in Youngsville, Pennsylvania. At the age of 14, she joined the Methodist Episcopal Church. She graduated from the Pennsylvania Female College (now Chatham University) in Pittsburgh, and then at the Elizabeth Blackwell Woman's Medical College of New York City.

In 1874, Trask received her appointment to Fuzhou. In January 1875, the mission asked for US$5,000 to build a hospital and residence for Trask, which was appropriated by the General Executive Committee the following May. The hospital officially opened in 1877. At the close of the second year, Trask reported the number of patients registered as 1,208. After six years, she made a visit to the US in 1880 for a few months, and then returned to China. Her student during this time was a local Fuzhounese girl named Hü King Eng, who Trask saw much promise in. She wrote to her colleagues at the Woman's Mission in Philadelphia, who made arrangements for Hü to receive her medical education in the US. Trask's intention was for Hü to run the hospital after completing her education. January 6, 1885, Trask married John Phelps Cowles, Jr., in Fuzhou. His parents, Rev. John and Eunice Cowles, were presidents of Ipswich Female Seminary. while his sister, Mary, was an educator and philanthropist.

Trask died March 20, 1936, in Barcroft, Virginia.

== Bibliography ==
- Zaccarini, Maria Cristina (2001). The Sino-American Friendship as Tradition and Challenge: Dr. Ailie Gale in China, 1908-1950. Lehigh University Press. ISBN 978-0-934223-70-6.
