= Charlotte Perkins =

Charlotte Perkins may refer to:

- Charlotte Perkins Gilman (1860–1935), American humanist, writer and lecturer for social reform
- Charlotte Bass Perkins (1808–1897), American Christian missionary
