= John Cummings (Massachusetts banker) =

American businessman

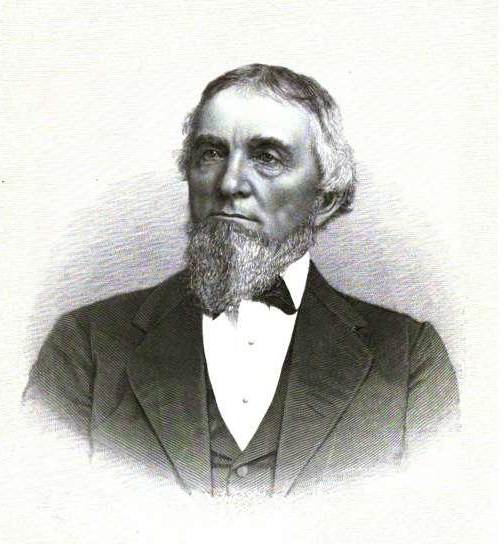
- Born: October 19, 1812; Woburn, Massachusetts, US
- Died: December 21, 1898 (aged 86); Woburn, Massachusetts, US
- Occupation: Banker
- Spouses: Sarah Phillips, Mary Cummings
- Children: died in infancy
- Parent(s): John Cummings and Marcia Richardson

Signature
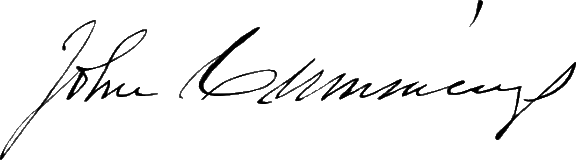

John Cummings (October 19, 1812 – December 21, 1898) served as the president of Shawmut Bank for 30 years, from 1868 until 1898. Owner of a farm and tannery in Woburn, Massachusetts, John Cummings also served in both the Massachusetts House of Representatives and Massachusetts Senate. He ran for Congress, unsuccessfully, in 1876.

== Work ==
John Cummings Laboratory at MIT

John Cummings was affiliated with many institutions, but the one in which he took the most interest was the Massachusetts Institute of Technology, for which he served as treasurer between 1872 and 1889, and he was also a member of its executive committee. By a vote of the Corporation in 1889, when he retired from the office of Treasurer, Mr. Cummings' name was applied to the laboratories of Mining Engineering and Metallurgy in recognition of his services.

He was a trustee of the Woburn Public Library and member of the school's committee at the Warren Academy of Woburn.

John Cummings was a director of the Perkins Institution for the Blind.

== Interests ==
It is also said that his great recreation was the study of Natural History and "he became so interested in that, that he was led to join the Boston Natural History Society, where he became much interested in Botany, and was chairman of the Botany section."

Mr. Cummings took a great interest in his large farm in Woburn which he had bought from the heirs of his grandfather. Today his farm is kept as a public pleasure ground known as Mary Cummings Park. It was named after his second wife, who gave the farm on Babylon Hill to the City of Boston to be kept in trust "forever open as a public pleasure ground".

Cummings died at his home in Woburn on December 21, 1898.
