= Paradise Lust =

2011 book by Brook Wilensky-Lanford

Paradise Lust: Searching for the Garden of Eden
- Author: Brook Wilensky-Lanford
- Language: English
- Genre: Nonfiction
- Publisher: Grove Press
- Publication date: 2011
- Publication place: United States
- Media type: Print (Hardcover)
- ISBN: 978-0-8021-1980-3

Paradise Lust: Searching for the Garden of Eden is a 2011 book by Brook Wilensky-Lanford that discusses efforts to locate the Garden of Eden.

Wilensky-Lanford writes that more people began to search for the garden to reassert the truth of the Bible after the advent of Darwinism. The book focuses on 20th-century individuals who have sought to locate the garden. Wilensky-Lanford profiles several individuals who have discussed the location of the garden, including William Fairfield Warren and the author(s) of The Urantia Book. Paradise Lust also discusses the work of archaeologist Juris Zarins.

Associated Press writer Carl Hartman applauded the book as "witty and exhaustively researched", though he notes that the title could confuse readers. (Wilensky-Lanford chose the book's title as a reference to Paradise Lost by John Milton, not to indicate sexual content.) Writing in The New York Times, Andrea Wulf praised the book as an "enjoyable parade of oddities" that is an "appealing mix of serious research and tongue-in-cheek humor", but noted that it occasionally felt like a repetitive list of bizarre characters.
