= Eunice Caldwell Cowles =

American educator (1811–1903)

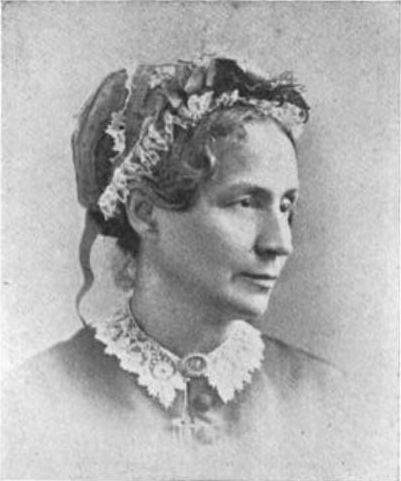
Eunice Caldwell Cowles

Eunice Caldwell Cowles (February 4, 1811 – September 10, 1903) was an American educator who influenced hundreds of women in the U.S. and abroad. She was the first associate of Mary Lyon in the opening of Mount Holyoke Seminary (now Mount Holyoke College). She had previously graduated under Lyon and Zilpah Grant from Ipswich Seminary (later known as, Ipswich Female Seminary) in 1829, where she was afterwards principal from 1844 to 1876. She also served as the first principal of Wheaton Seminary (now Wheaton College). She was also affiliated with the Christian Woman's Board of Missions (C.W.B.M.), having co-founded the Essex North Branch and serving as its president.

== Early life and education ==
Eunice Caldwell was born in Ipswich, Massachusetts, February 4, 1811. Her parents were Capt. John and Eunice (Stanwood) Caldwell. Her father drowned in 1835.

Cowles graduated from the Ipswich Female Seminary with the first class in 1829.

== Career ==
For ten years before her marriage, she was a pupil or teacher with Zilpah Grant or Mary Lyon. In 1834, she became the first principal of Wheaton Seminary at Norton, Massachusetts, leaving that position to fulfill a promise made to Lyon to be her associate in the opening of Mt. Holyoke Seminary.

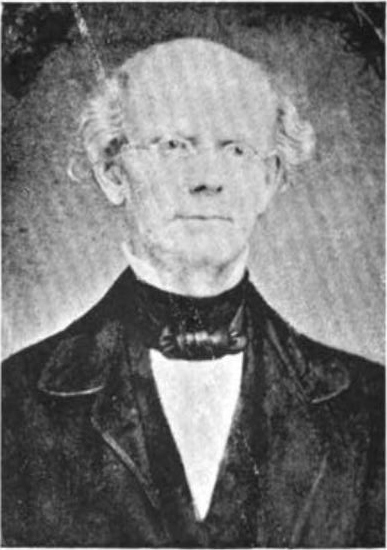
John Phelps Cowles

While serving as teacher there, she made the acquaintance of Rev. John Phelps Cowles, marrying him October 16, 1838. She removed to Oberlin, Ohio with him, he being a professor of Hebrew at Oberlin College. They remained there until 1844.

Returning to Ipswich in 1844, they served as joint presidents over Ipswich Seminary, her role including instruction and direction. Her area of specialization was Mathematics. The seminary was continued under the direction of the Cowles until 1876, when it was closed, advancing years of the couple compelling them to retire from active educational work.

== Personal life ==
The Cowles had five children: three daughters and two sons. Mary Phelps Cowles Cummings, born in 1839, was the eldest child; she became a philanthropist. Roxana Caldwell Cowles was born in 1841, and upon her death, left Mary money, which Mary used to create a scholarship for Ipswich girls. John Phelps Cowles Jr was born in 1844; he married Sigourney Trask in Fuzhou, China and disappeared in Nicaragua on his final return trip from China to Massachusetts in 1893. Henry Augustine Cowles was born in 1846 and died a soldier in the Civil War in 1864. Susan Cowles was born in 1848.

Cowles became a member of the First Congregational church when she was 13 years old, and for nearly 80 years, was affiliated with it. She was deeply interested in foreign missions and was one of the original members of the Sunday school.

The Essex North Branch of the C.W.B.M. was organized in 1879, Cowles being prominent in its establishment. For three years, she served as president of the Branch. After she resigned the active duties, she was accorded the title of Honorary President of the Branch until her death.

== Death and legacy ==
Cowles died at her home in Ipswich, September 10, 1903, after a short illness, survived by her three daughters, her husband and sons having preceded her in death.

Using the pen name "Madame Hale", Julia A. Eastman wrote a book, Beulah Romney's School Days, regarding Cowles and the Ipswich seminary.

The Eunice Caldwell Cowles Papers are held in the Five College Compass Digital Collections.
