= Mary W. Chapin =

American educator

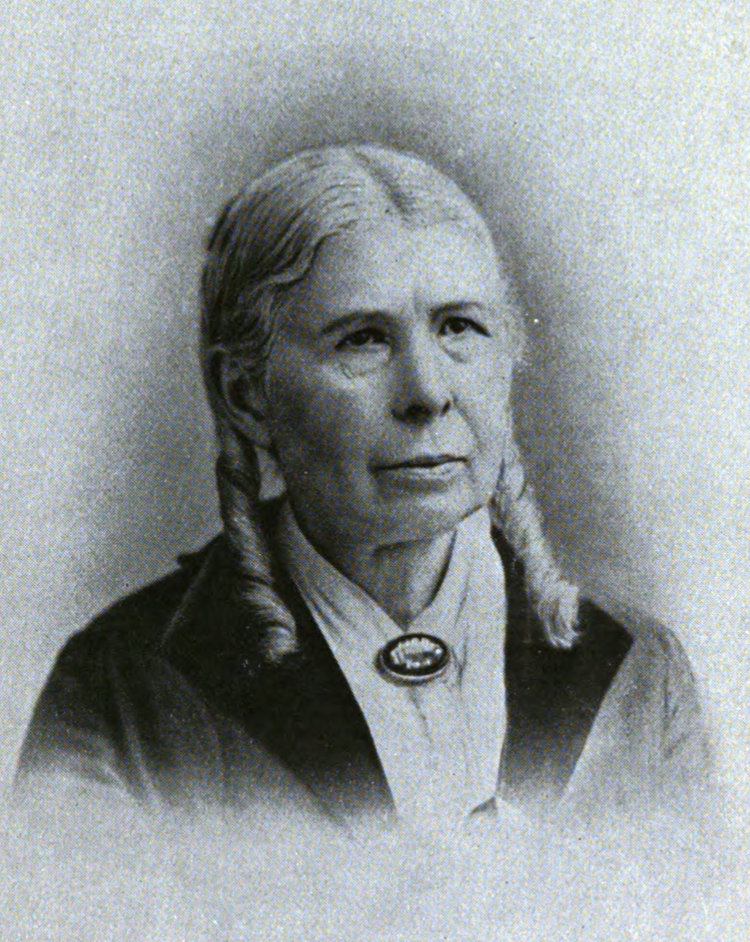

3rd President of Mount Holyoke College (Acting Principal and Principal)
- In office 1850–1865
- Preceded by: Mary C. Whitman
- Succeeded by: Sophia D. Stoddard

Personal details
- Born: 1820
- Died: 1889 (aged 68–69)
- Education: Mount Holyoke College (Mount Holyoke Female Seminary)
- Profession: Professor

Mary W. Chapin (1820–1889) was an American educator who served as the third president (referred to at that time as "acting principal" and "principal") of Mount Holyoke College (then Mount Holyoke Female Seminary) from 1850 to 1852 and Principal from 1852 to 1865. She graduated from Mount Holyoke in 1841 and taught there for seven years before becoming Head.

== See also ==
- Presidents of Mount Holyoke College
