= Sophia D. Stoddard =

Sarah D. Stoddard

4th President of Mount Holyoke College (Acting Principal)
- In office 1865–1867
- Preceded by: Mary W. Chapin
- Succeeded by: Helen M. French

Personal details
- Born: July 23, 1820 Hartford, Vermont
- Died: March 4, 1891 (aged 70) Northampton, Massachusetts
- Education: Mount Holyoke College (Mount Holyoke Female Seminary)
- Profession: Professor

Sarah D. Stoddard (July 23, 1820 - March 4, 1891) (Sarah D. Hazen) was an American educator who served as the fourth president (referred to at that time as "acting principal") of Mount Holyoke College (then Mount Holyoke Female Seminary) from 1865 to 1867. She graduated from Mount Holyoke in 1841 and taught there for eight years before becoming Head.

== See also ==
- Presidents of Mount Holyoke College
