= Helen M. French =

American educator

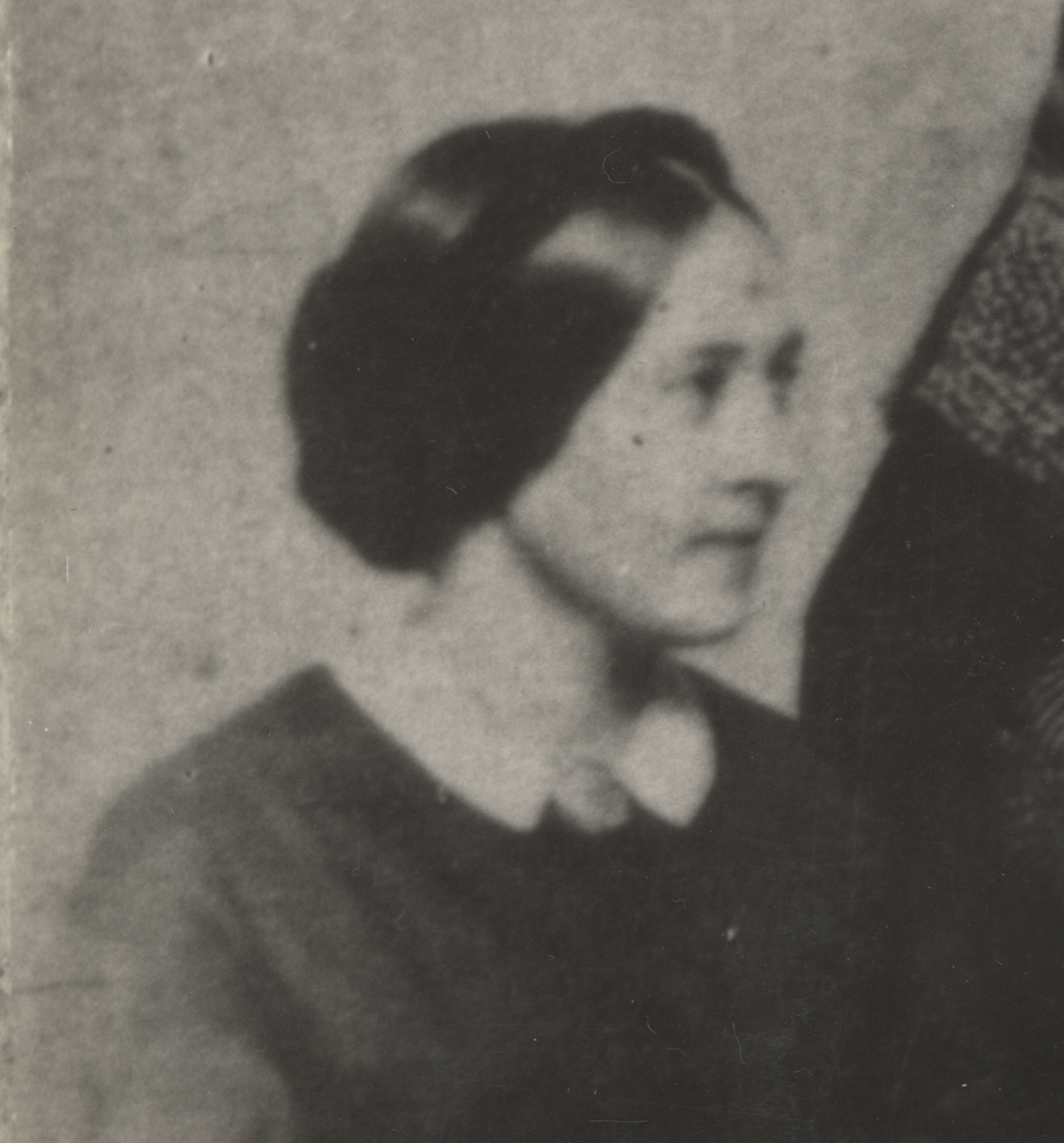

5th President of Mount Holyoke College (Principal)
- In office 1867–1872
- Preceded by: Sophia D. Stoddard
- Succeeded by: Julia E. Ward

Personal details
- Born: 1832
- Died: 1909 (aged 76–77)
- Education: Mount Holyoke College (Mount Holyoke Female Seminary)
- Profession: Professor

Helen M. French (1832–1909) was an American educator who served as the fifth president (referred to at that time as "principal") of Mount Holyoke College (then Mount Holyoke Female Seminary) from 1867 to 1872. She graduated from Mount Holyoke in 1857 and taught there for ten years before becoming principal.

== See also ==
- Presidents of Mount Holyoke College
