= Mary C. Whitman =

2nd President of Mount Holyoke College (Principal)
- In office 1849–1850
- Preceded by: Mary Lyon
- Succeeded by: Mary W. Chapin

Personal details
- Born: 1809
- Died: 1875 (aged 65–66)
- Education: Mount Holyoke College (Mount Holyoke Female Seminary)
- Profession: Professor

Mary C. Whitman (1809–1875) was an American educator who served as the second president (referred to at that time as "principal") of Mount Holyoke College (then Mount Holyoke Female Seminary) from 1849 to 1850. She graduated from Mount Holyoke in 1839, taught there from 1840 to 1842, and was Associate Principal from 1842 to 1849 before becoming Head.

== See also ==
- Presidents of Mount Holyoke College
