= Louisa F. Cowles =

American academic

Louise F. Cowles

8th President of Mount Holyoke College
- In office 1889–1890
- Preceded by: Mary A. Brigham
- Succeeded by: Elizabeth Storrs Mead

Personal details
- Born: 12 October 1842 Norfolk, Connecticut
- Died: 6 May 1924 (aged 81) South Hadley, Massachusetts
- Education: Smith College
- Profession: Professor

Louise Frances Cowles (12 Oct 1842–6 May 1924) was an American educator who was the 8th president (Acting) of Mount Holyoke College from 1889 to 1890. She was born on 12 October 1842 in Norfolk, Connecticut. Her brother Joseph N. Cowles was elected to the Connecticut State Senate in 1888.

She graduated from Mount Holyoke College in 1866 and received a master's degree from Smith College in 1892. She did additional graduate work at the Worcester Institute of Technology, Boston School of Technology, Amherst College, and Cornell University.

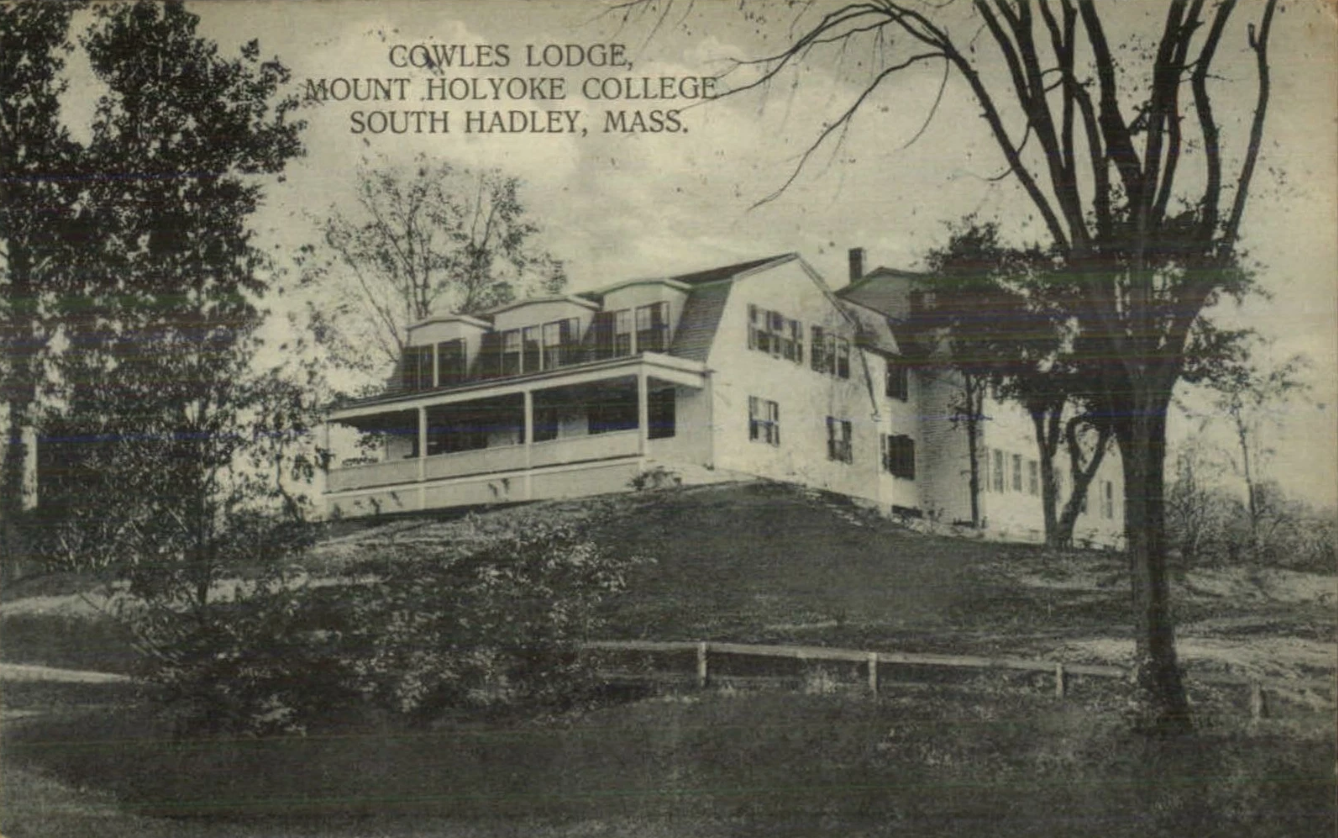
A postcard of Cowles Lodge at Mount Holyoke, named in honor of Professor Louise F. Cowles

In 1867, Cowles began teaching at Mount Holyoke as a Professor of Geology and Mineralogy; she also sometimes taught math and other subjects. As head of the Department of Geology, she played a crucial role in expanding the college's collection of fossils and minerals. Cowles was a member of the American Association for the Advancement of Science and the secretary of Mount Holyoke's national alumnae association for 15 years. She was made a Professor Emeritus after her retirement in 1904 and maintained strong connections to the college. Cowles Lodge, built as a freshman dorm in 1910, was named in her honor. It was demolished in 1965.

Cowles never married. She died at the university's Peterson Lodge on 6 May 1924.

== See also ==
- Presidents of Mount Holyoke College
