= Henry Lyman (missionary) =

American Baptist missionary murdered in Sumatra

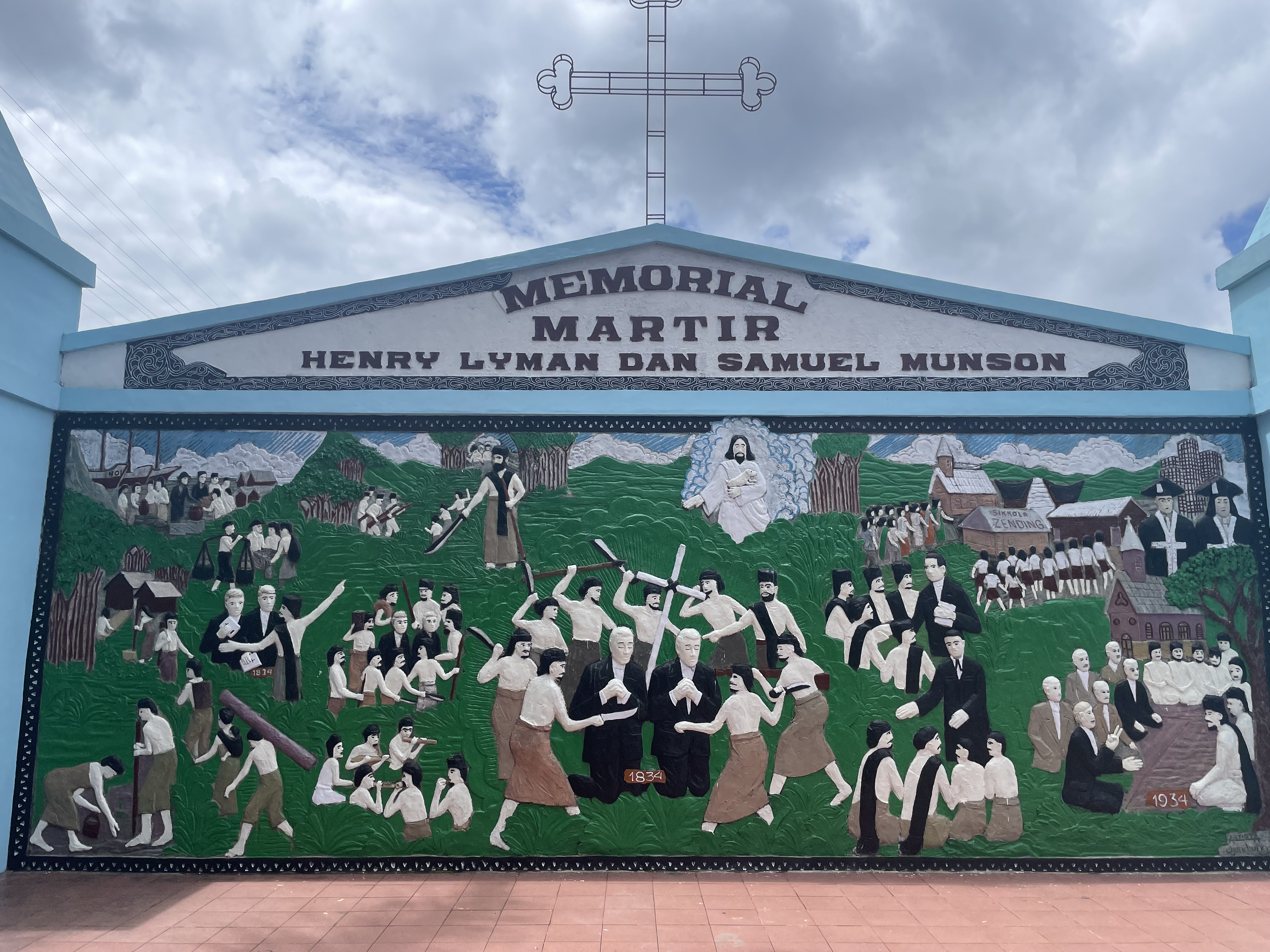
Memorial of Lyman and Munson in North Tapanuli Regency, North Sumatra

Henry Lyman (Northampton, Massachusetts November 23, 1809–Sacca village, Lobu Pining, Tarutung, Sumatra June 28, 1834) was an American Baptist missionary murdered in Sumatra together with his colleague Samuel Munson.

His parents were Theodore Lyman and Susan Willard Whitney, his wife Eliza Pond. His sister, Hannah Lyman, was the first Lady-Principal of Vassar College.
