= Mary A. Brigham =

American academic

Mary Ann Brigham
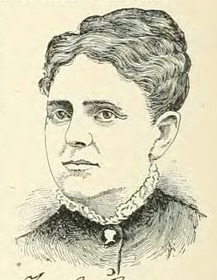

President Elect of Mount Holyoke College
- In office 1889–1889
- Preceded by: Elizabeth Blanchard
- Succeeded by: Louisa F. Cowles

Personal details
- Born: December 6 1829 Westborough, Massachusetts
- Died: 29 June 1889 (aged 59) New Haven, Connecticut
- Spouse: never married
- Education: Mount Holyoke Female Seminary
- Profession: Professor
- Website: Mt. Holyoke College Archives

Mary Ann Brigham (6 December 1829 – 29 June 1889) was an American educator who, after teaching for a few years, was elected President of Mount Holyoke College in 1889, but died in a railway accident before she could take up her appointment."

== Biography ==
Mary Ann Brigham was born 6 December 1829 in Westborough, Massachusetts to Dexter Brigham and Mary Ann (Gould) Brigham. She was a descendant of Thomas Brigham and Edmund Rice, early immigrants to Massachusetts Bay Colony. She was educated at Mount Holyoke Female Seminary, as part of the 1849 class.

Brigham began her academic career in 1855, teaching at Mount Holyoke. In 1858 she was named assistant principal at Ingham University, remaining in that post until 1863. From 1863 to 1889 she served as a teacher and associate principal at Brooklyn Heights Seminary. She served for several years as president of the Mt. Holyoke Alumnae Club in New York City, and shortly after the 1888 charter of Mount Holyoke College, she was elected as 7th President of her alma mater. On 29 June 1889, as she was traveling from New York to South Hadley, Massachusetts to assume her post, the train crashed at New Haven, Connecticut. She died in the wreck. In 1897 a dormitory was erected by the New York Alumnae Club on the Mt. Holyoke campus. It was named The Mary Brigham Hall.
