= Elizabeth Eggert =

Elizabeth Avery Eggert (1848–1935) was an English-American homeopathic physician, businesswoman, clubwoman, and activist who advocated for women's suffrage in Ohio. She contributed to the nationwide reform of public health, philanthropy and women's suffrage during the end of the 19th and beginning of the 20th centuries.

== Early life and education ==
Born Elizabeth Avery in 1848 in Oxfordshire, England, Eggert moved to the United States in 1853 with her family, where they settled in Connecticut. Eggert studied at the Ipswich Female Seminary in Massachusetts. By the end of the 1860s she graduated from the Homeopathic Hospital College for Women, in Cleveland, Ohio.

== Career ==
Eggert moved to Lawrence, Kansas, where she opened a homeopathic medical practice. In 1872, she became the first woman in Kansas to be admitted to any medical society in that state when she joined the Kansas Homeopathic Medical Society.

In 1873, she married Frederick Eggert (May 30, 1843 – April 26, 1918) of Milwaukee, Wisconsin. In 1876 the two arrived in Albany, Oregon, where Frederick supported them working in dry goods. In 1882 the Eggerts moved again, to Portland, Oregon, where the couple opened a shoe store called Eggert, Young & Company. The business grew throughout the Pacific Northwest, opening several branches. Frederick continued to manage the home store in Portland until 1918, when he died at the age of 75. Elizabeth continued as the vice president of Eggert-Young Company in Portland.

== Suffragist ==
Eggert was active for about 25 years in the women's suffrage movement in Oregon. She was the president of the Portland Woman's Club in 1912, when women in Oregon gained the right to vote with the passing of the Oregon Equal Suffrage Amendment. As a member of the club's Suffrage Campaign Committee and an organizer and speaker on the movement's behalf, she likely played a key role in the success of the campaign.
