= Elizabeth Blanchard (educator) =

American academic administrator

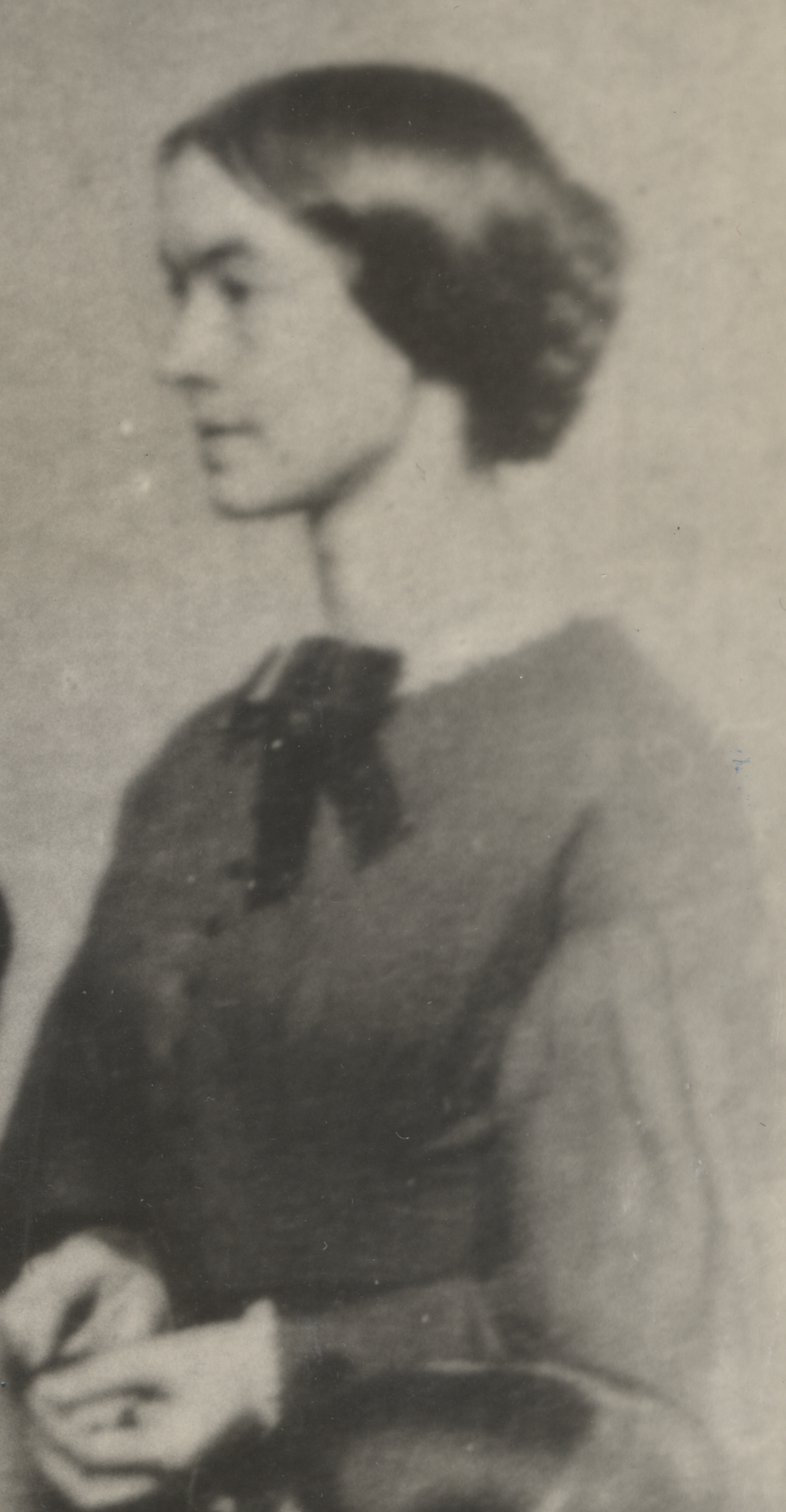

7th President of Mount Holyoke College (Principal and Acting President)
- In office 1883–1889
- Preceded by: Julia E. Ward
- Succeeded by: Mary A. Brigham

Personal details
- Born: 1834
- Died: 1891 (aged 56–57)
- Education: Mount Holyoke College (Mount Holyoke Female Seminary)
- Profession: Professor

Elizabeth Blanchard (1834–1891) was an American educator who was the seventh president of Mount Holyoke College (as Principal and Acting President).

Blanchard graduated from Mount Holyoke Female Seminary in 1858, and taught there for twelve years before becoming the Associate Principal from 1872-1883. She served as Principal from 1883-1888. When Mount Holyoke Female Seminary received its collegiate charter and became Mount Holyoke College, she served as Acting President from 1888-1889.

== See also ==
- Presidents of Mount Holyoke College
