= Julia E. Ward =

American educator

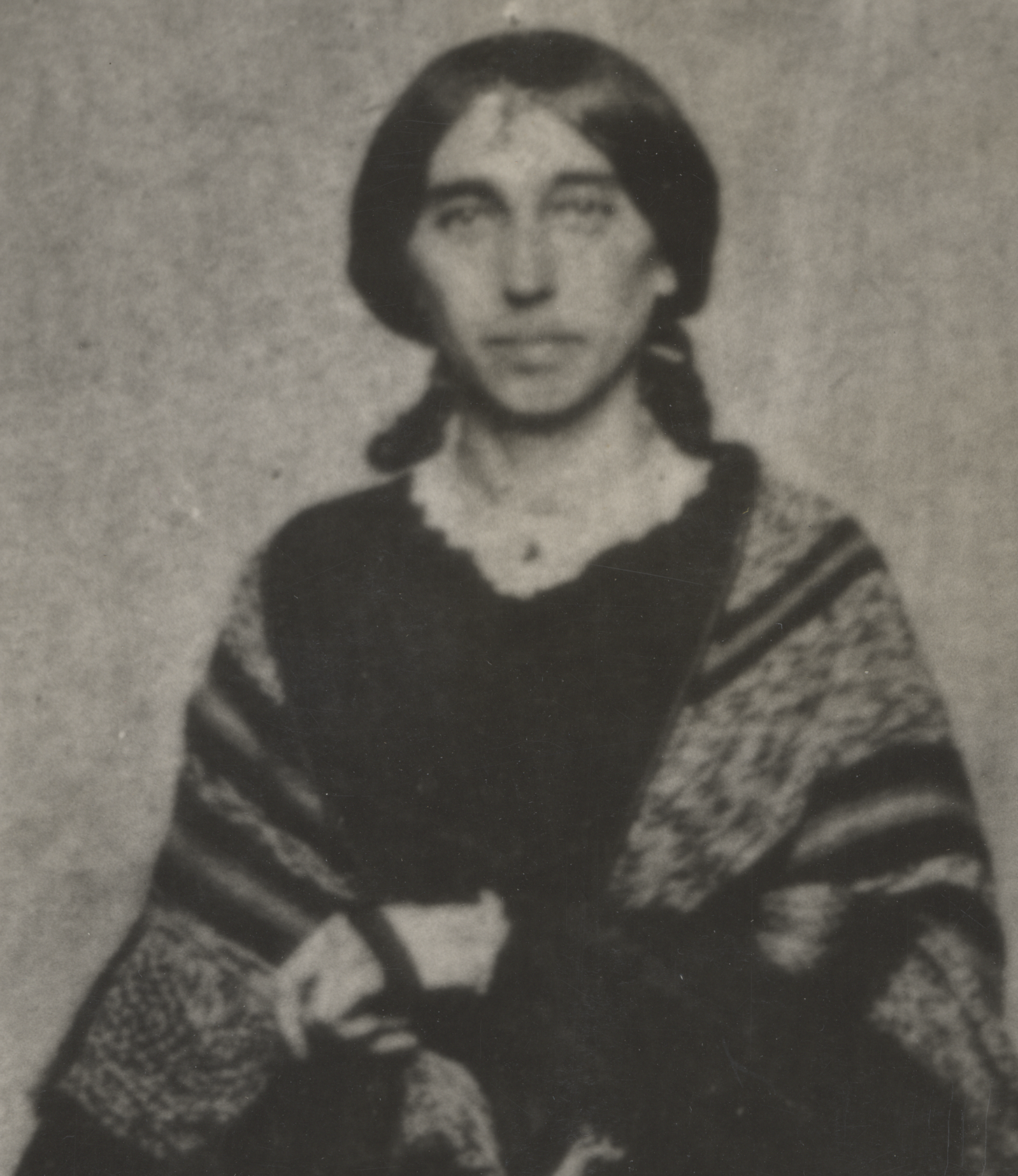

6th President of Mount Holyoke College (Principal)
- In office 1872–1883
- Preceded by: Helen M. French
- Succeeded by: Elizabeth Blanchard

Personal details
- Died: 1921
- Education: Mount Holyoke College (Mount Holyoke Female Seminary)
- Profession: Professor

Julia E. Ward (died 1921) was an American educator who served as the sixth president (referred to at that time as "principal") of Mount Holyoke College (then Mount Holyoke Female Seminary) from 1872 to 1883. She graduated from Mount Holyoke in 1857 and taught there for five years before becoming principal.

== See also ==
- Presidents of Mount Holyoke College
