= Samuel Munson =

American Baptist missionary

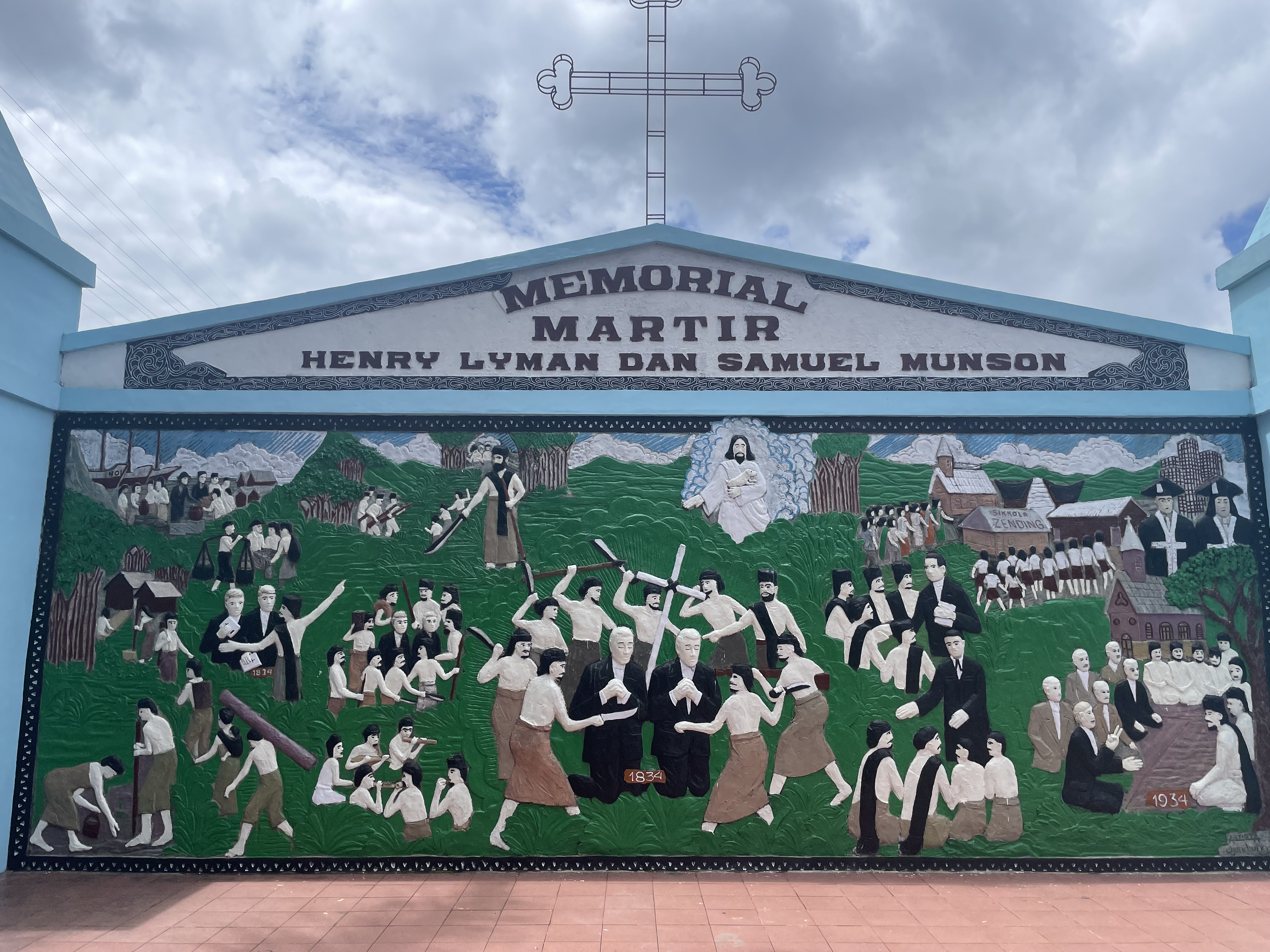
Memorial of Lyman and Munson in North Tapanuli Regency, North Sumatra

Samuel Munson (1804 in New Sharon, Maine – June 28, 1834 in Sacca, Lopu Pining, Tapanuli, Sumatra) was an American Baptist missionary who, together with his colleague Henry Lyman, was murdered and cannibalised in Sumatra.
