= Charlotte Bass Perkins =

American Christian missionary

Charlotte Bass Perkins (August 2, 1808 – December 15, 1897) was an American Christian missionary. She lived at the mission in Urmia, Iran, from 1835 to 1857; her husband Justin Perkins was also a missionary.

== Biography ==
Charlotte Bass was born in Middlebury, Vermont, to William and Fidelia Bass. She attended Ipswich Female Seminary in 1832 and married Justin Perkins in July 1833. Earlier that year, Justin had accepted a commission to work among the “Nestorians” (Assyrian Church of the East members, also referred to as East Syriac Christians) from the American Board of Commissioners for Foreign Missions. In September 1833, Justin and Charlotte departed the United States from Boston, ultimately destined for Persia. They stayed with other missionaries in Istanbul, Turkey for five months before moving on in May 1834. Charlotte Perkins became the first American woman to cross the Black Sea during their continued journey. She also delivered her first child during their journey on August 26, 1834, while in Tabriz, Iran. She was ill and unaware of the birth of her daughter for the first three days. Charlotte survived, though her husband later said that she never did fully recover from the effects of this illness. Eventually, the Perkinses, along with Asahel Grant and Judith Grant, arrived in November 1835 to Urmia, where they would establish their mission.

Justin and Charlotte remained at the Urmia Mission from then until July 1841 when they left to journey to the United States on account of Charlotte's health. They reached New York in January 1842 and remained in the United States until in March 1843 they again left to return to the mission in Urmia. Charlotte continued to live and work at the mission until 1857. By then, she had had seven children: four who died before the age of 1, one who died at age 3, one who died at age 12, and one who would live into adulthood. The loss of her twelve-year-old daughter Judith Grant Perkins especially effected Charlotte's health and well-being.

In September 1857 Charlotte and her only surviving son, Henry Martyn Perkins, left Urmia to return to the U.S. on account of her health and for his education. Justin returned to the United States in 1858. When Justin again left the United States to return to Persia in 1862, Charlotte was committed to the McLean Asylum for the Insane in Somerville, Massachusetts. In 1863 she wrote a letter to the directors asking that she be released, but this request was denied. At an unknown later date, Perkins was released from the asylum. She was with her husband Justin when he died in 1869 in Chicopee, Massachusetts. Charlotte was living with her son Henry Martyn Perkins in Woolwich, Maine, when she died in 1897 in her ninetieth year of age.
