= William Fairfield Warren =

President of Boston University

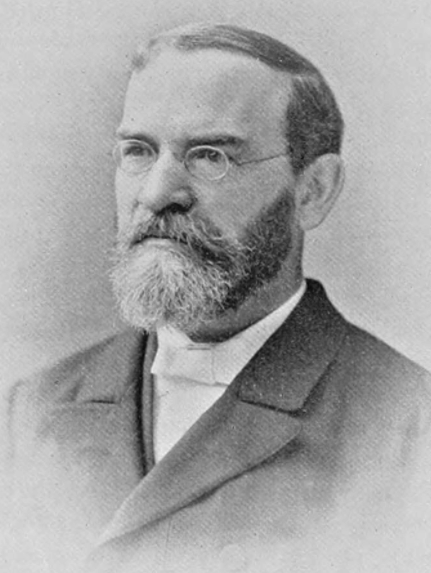
- Warren in an 1896 publication
- Born: March 13, 1833; Williamsburg, Massachusetts
- Died: December 7, 1929 (aged 96); Brookline, Massachusetts
- Education: Wesleyan University; Andover Theological Seminary
- Occupations: Clergyman, educator
- Spouse: Harriet Merrick Warren (m. 1861)

William Fairfield Warren (March 13, 1833 – December 7, 1929) was the first president of Boston University.

== Biography ==
Born in Williamsburg, Massachusetts, he graduated from Wesleyan University, Middletown, Connecticut (1853), and there became a member of the Mystical Seven. He later studied at Andover Theological Seminary and at Berlin and Halle. He entered the New England Conference in 1855 and was professor of systematic theology in the Methodist Episcopal Missionary Institute at Bremen, Germany (1860–1866). He was acting president of the Boston University School of Theology (1866–1873), president of Boston University (1873–1903), and dean of the Boston University School of Theology (1903–1911). After 1873 he was also professor of comparative theology and philosophy of religion. He published:

- The True Key of Ancient Cosmology (1882)
- Paradise Found—the Cradle of the Human Race at the North Pole (1885)
- The Quest of the Perfect Religion (1886)
- In the Footsteps of Arminius (1888)
- The Story of Gottlieb (1890)
- Religions of the World and the World Religion (1900)
- The Earliest Cosmologies (1909)
- The Universe as Pictured in Milton's Paradise Lost (1915)

When Boston University was chartered in 1869, he helped make it the first university in the country fully open to women. He also helped create Wellesley College in 1870. He was the brother of Henry White Warren.

In 1861, he married Harriet Merrick Warren, the first editor of The Heathen Woman's Friend. He died at his home in Brookline, Massachusetts on December 7, 1929, at the age of 96.

== Cradle of the Human Race at the North Pole ==
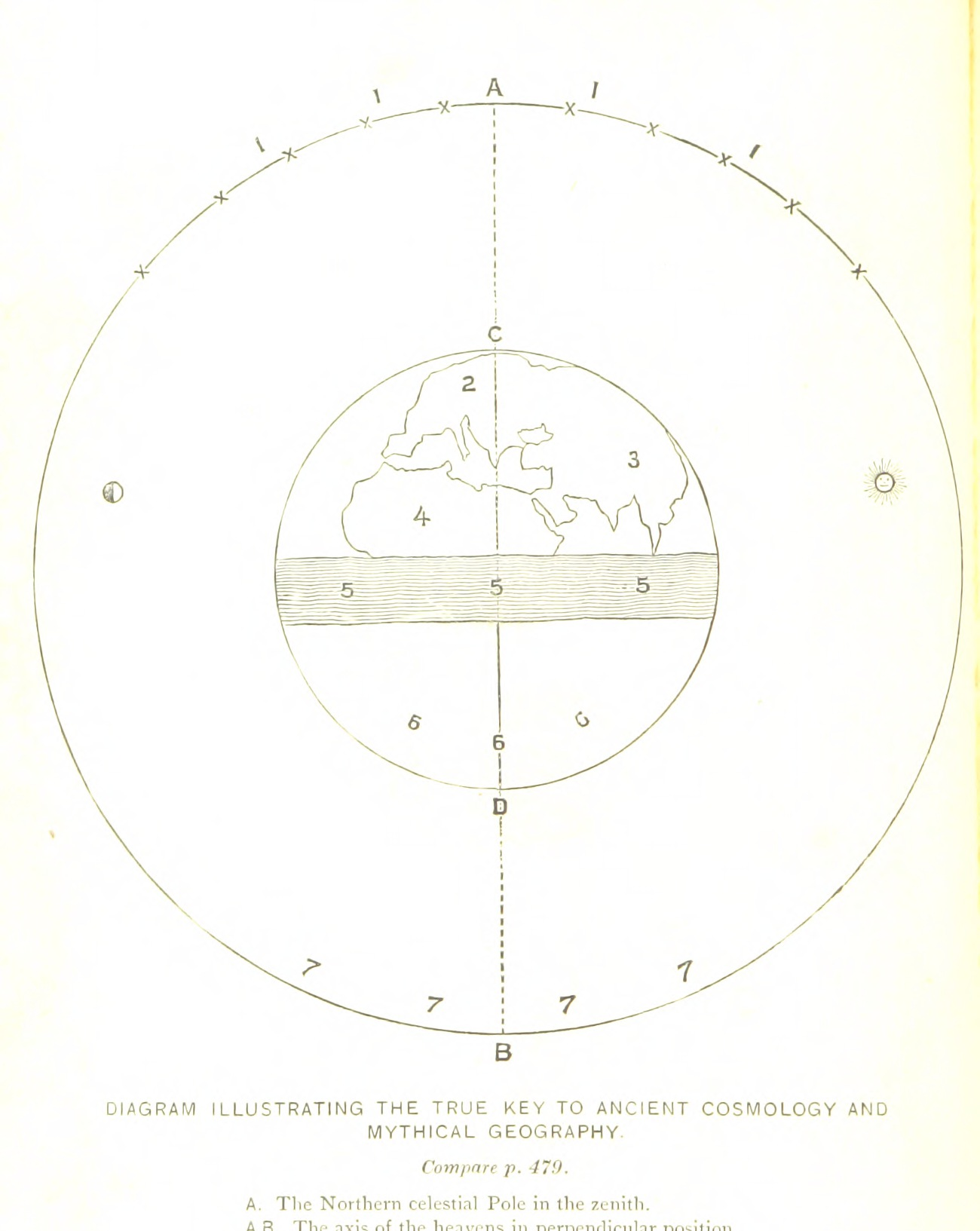
"Diagram illustrating the true key to ancient cosmology and mythical geography", page 10 of Paradise Found...

Warren wrote a book promoting his belief that the original centre of mankind once sat at the North Pole entitled Paradise Found: The Cradle of the Human Race at the North Pole (1885). In this work Warren placed Atlantis at the North Pole, as well as the Garden of Eden, Mount Meru, Avalon and Hyperborea. Warren believed all these mythical lands were folk memories of a former inhabited far northern seat where man was originally created.

Warren's identification of Atlantis with the North Pole was maintained by positioning Atlas in the far north by mapping out ancient Greek cosmology. Warren equated the primordial Titan Atlas of Greek mythology who supported the Heavens on his shoulders (or supported the earth on a pillar) to the Atlas described in Plato's dialogue Critias as the first ruler of Atlantis (Critias, 114a). In Warren's view, all the axis mundi or cosmic-axis of ancient legends (Yggdrasil, Irminsul and Atlas' pillar) had to be in the far north "at the top of the world":

...To locate these in right mutual relations, one must begin by representing to himself the earth as a sphere or spheroid, and as situated within, and concentric with, the starry sphere, each having its axis perpendicular, and its north pole at the top. The pole-star is thus in the true zenith, and the heavenly heights centring about it are the abode of the supreme god or gods.

Warren noted how Homer, Virgil and Hesiod all placed Atlas or his world pillar at the "ends of the earth", meaning in his view the far northern arctic regions, while Euripides related Atlas to the Pole Star. Therefore, in Warren's view Atlantis sat in the far north, at the North Pole, since the Atlas in his ancient Greek cosmological mapping stood in the far northern zenith, under the Pole Star.

Bal Gangadhar Tilak, an Indian nationalist and historian, quotes extensively from this book and presents his own studies of Vedas and Persian Avesta in his book The Arctic Home in the Vedas arguing for the presence of ancient humans in the Arctic.
