= Harriet Merrick Warren =

American journalist

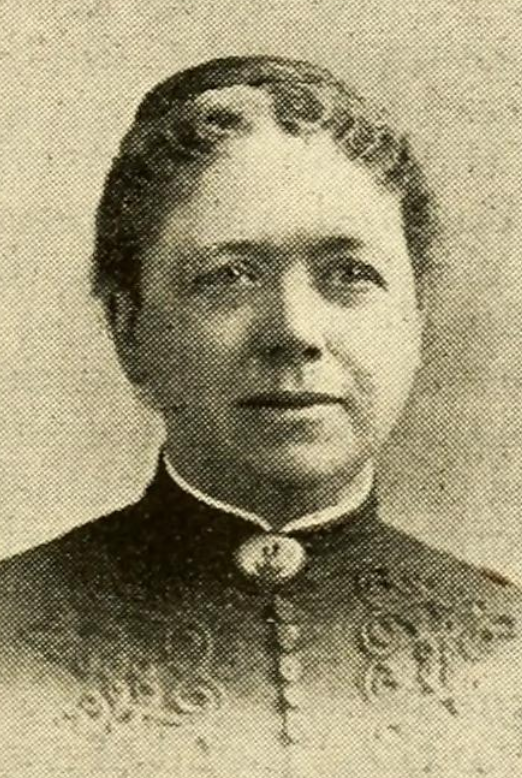
- Harriet Merrick Warren, from a 1918 publication
- Born: Harriet Cornelia Merrick; September 15, 1843; Wilbraham, Massachusetts
- Died: January 7, 1893 (aged 49)
- Occupation: Editor of religious periodicals
- Spouse: William Fairfield Warren

Harriet Merrick Warren (September 15, 1843 – January 7, 1893) was an American editor. She was also an untiring worker in the Woman's Foreign Missionary Society, its first recording secretary, and for years, president of the New England Branch. Warren is remembered as a "major leader of 'Woman's Work for Woman'" movement.

== Early life and education ==
Harriet Cornelia Merrick was born at Wilbraham, Massachusetts, September 15, 1843. Her parents were John M. and Mary J. Merrick. John was a leading citizen of Wilbraham and of Hampden County, occupying many important public positions, both civil and ecclesiastical. He was a trustee of Wesleyan Academy, and a member of the board.

She was educated at Wilbraham Academy, of which her father was a trustee; and the academy of which Dr. Miner Raymond served as principal.

== Career ==
On April 14, 1861, she married Rev. William Fairfield Warren, who became the first president of Boston University. At the time of marriage, he was professor of the Missions-Anstalt at Bremen, Germany, under the direction of the Missionary Society of the Methodist Episcopal Church. She traveled with her husband in England, France, Germany, Switzerland, Italy, Austria, Bulgaria, Turkey and Greece. While there, she pursued advanced studies in history, literature, languages, art and music, and became adept in French, German, and Italian.

She returned to the US after five years and pursued religious and benevolent ways to occupy her time. From the first, she was in the Woman's Foreign Missionary movement. She was the editor of The Heathen Woman's Friend from its beginning, and made it one of the best missionary periodicals published. Two years, she additionally edited the German organ, the Heiden Frauen Frdund.

=== Heathen Woman's Friend ===
The first number of the society's first periodical, the Heathen Woman's Friend, appeared in June, 1869. Warren was its editor for 24 years, beginning at the time when women editors were so rare as to make the position one of isolation. Financially, it was questionable, there being no money behind the paper and no influence, except that a handful of women were devoted to sending to foreign fields their first missionaries. But the result proved to be a financial success, for in 30 years it not only paid its own expenses, but contributed over US$30,000 for the publication and scattering of leaflets and other missionary literature. Warren penned her last editorial, "The Bugle-call," on Thursday, January 5, 1893, two days before she died.

== Affiliations ==
Warren was president of the New England Branch of the Methodist Episcopal Church, a member and frequently chairman of the General Executive Committee, and a member of various other committees. She was also active in the management of the Massachusetts Society for the University Education of Women; a trustee of the New England Conservatory of Music; an officer in the Cambridge Indian Rights Association; a committee worker for the Cambridge Hospital; and a member and officer of the American Maternal Association.

== Death ==
She died at Cambridge, Massachusetts, January 7, 1893.
