= The Heathen Woman's Friend =

American Christian newspaper

- "The women that publish the tidings are a great host"
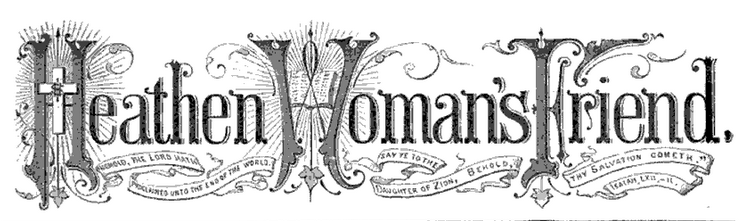
- Type: monthly
- Owner: Woman's Foreign Missionary Society of the Methodist Episcopal Church
- Founder(s): Lois Lee Parker and Clementina Rowe Butler
- Editor: Harriet Merrick Warren
- Founded: The Heathen Woman's Friend, vol. 1, no. 1 (May 1869)
- Ceased publication: vol. 27, no. 6 (December 1895)
- Relaunched: continued as Woman's Missionary Friend, vol. 27, no. 7 (January 1896)-vol. 73, no. 7 (August 1940)
- Language: English
- City: Boston, Massachusetts
- Country: U.S.
- Sister newspapers: Der Heiden-Frauen-Freund (established 1885)

The Heathen Woman's Friend (1869-1896; renamed Woman's Missionary Friend, 1896–1940) was a Christian women's monthly newspaper. Established in May 1869, it was published by the Woman's Foreign Missionary Society of the Methodist Episcopal Church in Boston, Massachusetts. The monthly magazine describe conditions in the mission fields of the church, document the work of the society, and provide assistance to missionaries. The Heathen Woman's Friend was launched with volume 1, number 1 in May 1869. Its final issue, volume 27, number 6, was issued December 1895. The publication was relaunched as the Woman's Missionary Friend with volume 27, number 7 in January 1896, and ended with volume 73, number 7 in August 1940.

The paper was able to pay its expenses and gave large sums to the Society. From 1882 to 1893, it contributed $26,000 to other forms of church work, and aided in carrying the miscellaneous literature published by the Society, the annual reports, uniform studies, maps of mission fields, life membership certificates for adults and for children, and a great variety of missionary leaflets.

== Organization ==
At the very beginning of the Society, it was proposed that a monthly paper be issued, and the following prospectus was printed: "The" paper will be devoted more especially to the interests of the work among heathen women, and will be filled with interesting facts and incidents illustrating that work, furnished by those laboring in heathen lands. Information will be given concerning the customs and social life of the people, the various obstacles to be overcome in their Christianization, and the success which attends the various departments of missionary labor among them. The design is to furnish just such a paper as will be read with interest by all the friends of the cause, and one which will assist in enlisting the sympathies of the children also, and educate them more fully in the missionary work. The price of the paper .will be only thirty cents per annum, so that it will be within the reach of all."

The monthly magazine was launched to describe conditions in the mission fields of the church, document the work of the society, and provide assistance to missionaries. The paper was able to pay its expenses and gave large sums to the Society. From 1882 to 1893, it contributed $26,000 to other forms of church work, and aided in carrying the miscellaneous literature published by the Society, the annual reports, uniform studies, maps of mission fields, life membership certificates for adults and for children, and a great variety of missionary leaflets. Subscriptions ranged from 3,500 in 1869, to 21,000 in 1870, and 92,591 in 1929. Subscriptions could start in July, October, January, or April, though July and January were preferable.

== History ==
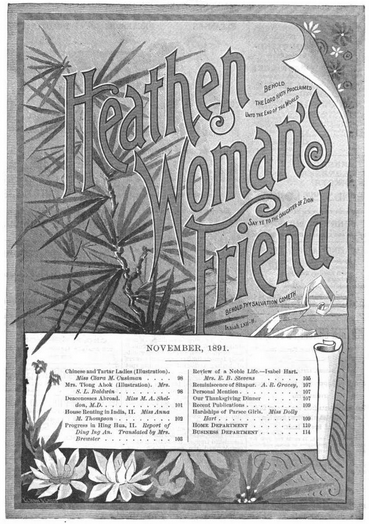
Heathen Woman's Friend 1869-1895

=== 1869 ===
After the decision was reached to publish a paper, Harriet Merrick Warren was selected as editor. She was then only 25 years old. At that time, papers and magazines conducted by women were something of a novelty, the field new and untried. She immediately went to work, and the first issue of the paper, eight pages, appeared in May, 1869. Lewis Flanders stood ready with US$500 to meet deficiencies, if at the end of the year it was needed. Others also promised financial assistance. At the close of the first year, its subscription list had reached 4,000; it paid all running expenses, and had a margin on hand. It was then enlarged to 12 pages. James P. Magee acted as general agent.

=== 1870s ===
A 20,000 edition was required in 1870. The subscription price was raised from $0.30 to $0.35, and Lydia Hill Daggett was appointed agent. The July number in 1871 contained a map, giving all the missions of the Methodist Episcopal Church in India, in their relation to each other and to large cities. It was prepared by Isabella Thoburn, and was the first cartographic view of these missions ever printed for the Methodist Episcopal Church.

In July, 1872, four more pages were added, and it became a 16-page paper. Its circulation reached 25,000. During the first seven years, a strong corps of contributing editors was annually elected. In May, 1872, the paper appeared with its first illustration. The engraving was that of the Mission House and Orphanage at Bareilly. Thereafter, this was a prominent feature. In 1875, the paper was increased to 24 pages, with a new heading, and the subscription price was raised to $0.50. In that year, a new feature was added, called the "Home Department," the material being contributed by the Branch Secretaries. During the first five years of publication, the paper focused primarily on India and China. Volume VIII began with the addition of Mary Bannister Willard as editor of the Children's Department. She filled this position for two years, and was then reluctantly excused. During the 10 year, owing to financial depression, the subscription decreased to 13,388. Three years later, the number again reached 20,000. From 1878, it furnished the outline of what was entitled the "Uniform Study" of each month, by means of which the women of the Societies united in pursuing a systematic course of study of missionary subjects.

=== 1880s ===
In November, 1882, Daggett's resignation was accepted, and Pauline J. Walden, the publishing agent, was again appointed. The paper published full reports of the General Executive Committee in annual session, and the acknowledgment of all moneys to the Society through the Branch Treasurers, and kept the thread of the history of the work on every mission field abroad, as well as much of the detail of the work by the Auxiliaries at home. The German language edition, Heiden Frauen Freund, was established in 1885. Four more pages were added in 1886. The salary of the editor and the publisher was raised in 1888 from $500 to $700, and a sum sufficient to cover incidental expenses.

=== 1890s ===
The February number of 1893 contained an unwritten page with the name "Harriet Merrick Warren," and underneath two dates, "September 15, 1843—January 7, 1893", announcing her death. For 24 years, she had been the newspaper's leader. She had developed the paper so that it soon took rank as one of the model missionary periodicals of the world, and had reached the largest number of subscribers of any woman's missionary magazine published at that time. After the death of Warren, her daughter, Mary Warren-Ayars, was appointed to take the mother's place, which she accepted. In July 1893, the form of the paper was changed, as had long been contemplated, to that of a magazine, and contained 30 pages. In the Young Woman's Department was included a column of bright notes about "Other Girls," carrying out a desire expressed by Warren. For greater convenience, the table of contents and the columns containing information about Branch officers and the organization's other publications were brought together on the page next to the cover. Ayars carried on the work until the close of the year, declining a further appointment. At the General Executive Committee meeting in Saint Paul, Minnesota, in November, 1893, Louise Manning Hodgkins was unanimously elected to the position of editor.

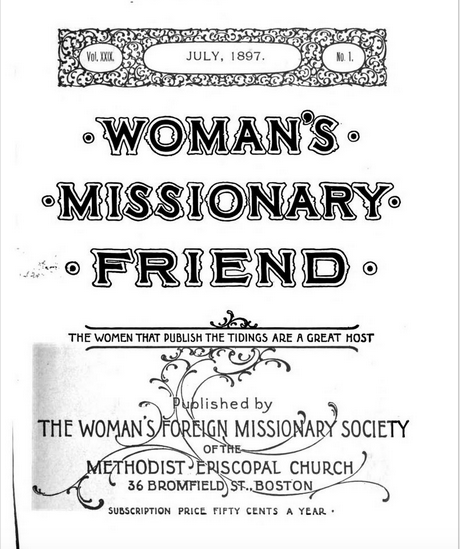
Rebranded in 1896 as Woman's Missionary Friend

Hodgkins introduced some new features, a department of "Family News," also a "Post-office Box," and brought out some special numbers. The first was in March, 1894 —the 25th anniversary number— which was embellished with photo-engravings of the founders, Mrs. E. W. Parker (Lois Lee Parker) and Mrs. Wm. Butler (Clementina Rowe Butler); and first missionaries, Isabella Thoburn and Dr. Clara Swain. The subscriptions in 1895 were nearly 22,000. But some considered the newspaper's name to be controversial and so a name change was discussed in St. Louis in 1896, with supporters claiming that it "expresses so much" while others argued that it was a "misnomer", even a "hindrance to their work". After discussion, it was renamed Woman's Missionary Friend. Philip Butler, a Boston artist, would design the cover.

=== 1900s ===
By 1911, the publisher was Annie G. Bailey, with Elizabeth C. Northup as Editor; the subscription price was $0.50 per year. The editor of the German language version, Der Frauen-Missions-Freund was Amalie M. Achard, of Elgin, Illinois; subscription price was $0.26 per year. The publication merged into Methodist Woman in 1940.
