= Ipswich Female Seminary =

- Type: Female Seminary
- Active: 1828–1876
- President: Zilpah P. Grant Banister
- Location: Ipswich, Massachusetts, USA; 42.6799°N 70.837°W

Ipswich Female Seminary was an American female seminary in Ipswich, Massachusetts. The institution was an early school for the secondary and tertiary education of young women. Enrollment averaged 116 students. According to Academy records, 88 of the school's graduates went on to teach as educational missionaries in the western and southern United States.

== History ==
The building occupied by the Ipswich Female Seminary, and which was employed simply for purposes of instruction and for study, was erected in 1825 by a joint-stock company incorporated under an Act of the General Court of Massachusetts. The property and affairs of the company were committed to a board of trustees, and so remained for about 24 years, when it was purchased by the new proprietor and principal of the Seminary, Rev. John P. Cowles.

Upon the erection of the building, a school for young women was immediately opened by the Rev. Hervey Wilbur, a teacher and a lecturer on astronomy, who was aided by several women. Wilbur was succeeded by the Rev. James M. Ward, of Abington, Massachusetts, under whose guidance and instruction the school was opened to both male and female students.

In 1828, Miss Zilpah P. Grant, later known as Mrs. William B. Banister of Newburyport, Massachusetts, accompanied by her assistant, Miss Mary Lyon, on the invitation of the trustees, transferred their school of young women from Derry, New Hampshire, to Ipswich. Grant had previously been a teacher and Lyon a student at an academy for female students in Byfield, Massachusetts. Under their joint administration, though each was occasionally absent, Lyon for her winter school in the western part of the State, and Grant in pursuit of health improvement, the school became prominent. Students came from all parts of the U.S., and even from other countries.

In 1835, Lyon relinquished her post as assistant principal of the Ipswich Seminary, and gave her time and energy to founding in 1837 of Mount Holyoke College in South Hadley, Massachusetts. Her success in this plan, the withdrawal of her influence from the Ipswich Seminary, and the failure of Grant's health, induced the latter, in 1839, to resign her position, and leave the Seminary in the hands of the trustees, who engaged various teachers and kept up a small school until 1844.

In 1844, it was reopened by Eunice Caldwell Cowles, an Ipswich graduate, and her husband John P. Cowles, a minister. The school was renamed "Female Seminary" in 1848. Under the care and instruction of the Cowles, and with the aid of efficient and accomplished assistants, the Seminary continued with varying prosperity until it was suspended in the fall of 1876, due to the increasing availability of public schools, which had reduced the need for educational institutions of this type.

== Curriculum ==
Pupils were not accepted based on examination, but, if of suitable age, upon application, and then classed according to their abilities and attainments, their own and their parents’ views, and their probable future course of life.

The school's focus was on preparing girls for careers as teachers and missionaries. It offered a "rigorous curriculum", including study of English, arithmetic, geography, chemistry, human physiology, history, the natural sciences, religion, vocal music, and calisthenics, and placed an emphasis on "standards of personal conduct and discipline". The institution had a chemical laboratory and a good philosophical cabinet and apparatus.

Teachers encouraged students in questioning and analysis, in addition to comprehension. As part of their preparation, students did practice teaching with guidance from a teacher.

Upon the completion of the established and liberal course of study, students were graduated with public exercises and a diploma. The custom of giving diplomas to young women on their completing a regular and prescribed course of study, was introduced by Grant at Derry, and brought by her to Ipswich. For years, hers was the only school for young women in which this practice was adopted. Neither the printed course of study nor the record of the catalogue ever fully exhibited the work done in the school. Students of a high grade often exceeded the requirements and distanced the report of the catalogue.

== Means of support ==
The institution was supported by tuition, with very little aid from other sources. Special benefactions for deserving scholars were a frequent occurrence; but of invested funds, the institution never had a dollar. The charges for board, and for tuition in all departments, were uniformly moderate. Simplicity in dress, in manners, and in character, was assiduously and successfully cultivated. The teachers thus aimed to bring the advantages of the school within the reach of young women born, not to affluence, but to exertion.

== Boarding ==
The pupils were accommodated in private boarding-houses, from four to twelve ordinarily in one family. The health of the students was remarkably good. During the Cowles' administration, a period of 32 years, only two pupils died while they were members of the school, and one of those brought the fatal disease with her. This result was believed to be due to the sunny and airy exposure of the building, to the limited number of pupils in each boarding-house, to the daily exercise of the pupils in the open air, and to their habits of regular study.

== Notable people ==
=== Staff ===
- Eunice Caldwell Cowles (1811– 1903)
- Zilpah P. Grant (1794–1874)
- Mary Lyon (1797–1849)

=== Alumni ===
- Mary Cummings (1839–1927), philanthropist
- Mary Abigail Dodge (1833–1896), writer and abolitionist
- Elizabeth Eggert (1848–1935), homeopathic physician and suffragist
- Louise Manning Hodgkins (1846–1935), educator, author, and editor
- Helen Hunt Jackson (1830–1885), writer and activist for the improved treatment of Native Americans by the United States government
- Hannah Lyman (1816–1871), first Lady Principal of Vassar College.
- Elizabeth Storrs Mead (1832–1917), President of Mount Holyoke College from 1890 - 1900
- Charlotte Bass Perkins (1808–1897), Christian missionary in Iran
- Abigail Willis Tenney Smith (1809–1885), missionary to the Sandwich Islands; teacher

== See also ==
- Women in education in the United States
