= Mary Cummings Park =

Public park in Massachusetts, United States

Coordinates: 42.4755°N 71.1947°W

Mary Cummings Park trail map, 2006

Mary Cummings Park is a 216-acre (0.87 km^{2}) public park in Woburn and Burlington, Massachusetts located at Babylon and Whispering Hills. The former farm and estate became a park managed by the City of Boston's Park Department in 1930. Mary Cummings left the land to the City under the condition that it be kept "forever open as a public pleasure ground". Since then it has been used for day camps including "Camp Joy", "Kamp for Kidz" and "Camp Wilderness" and as a public garden for school children called "Woburn Gardens". There are also several miles of trails which are open to the public. A radio controlled model airplane club operates their aircraft on one of the open fields which they maintain.

An Excerpt from the will of Mary Cummings:

Fourth, To the City of Boston, Massachusetts, I give and devise all the land together with the buildings thereon, in the City of Woburn and Town of Burlington, Massachusetts which was conveyed to me by Charles Fairchilds( by deed dated February 26, 1890, and recorded with Middlesex South District Deeds, Book 1967, Page 131, excepting so much thereof as shall have been conveyed by me in my lifetime or is herein otherwise specifically devised (the same being known as Babylon Hill), but in trust nevertheless for the following purposes and uses: To hold and keep the same forever open as a public pleasure ground, and to maintain and care for the same in a suitable manner in accordance with that purpose.

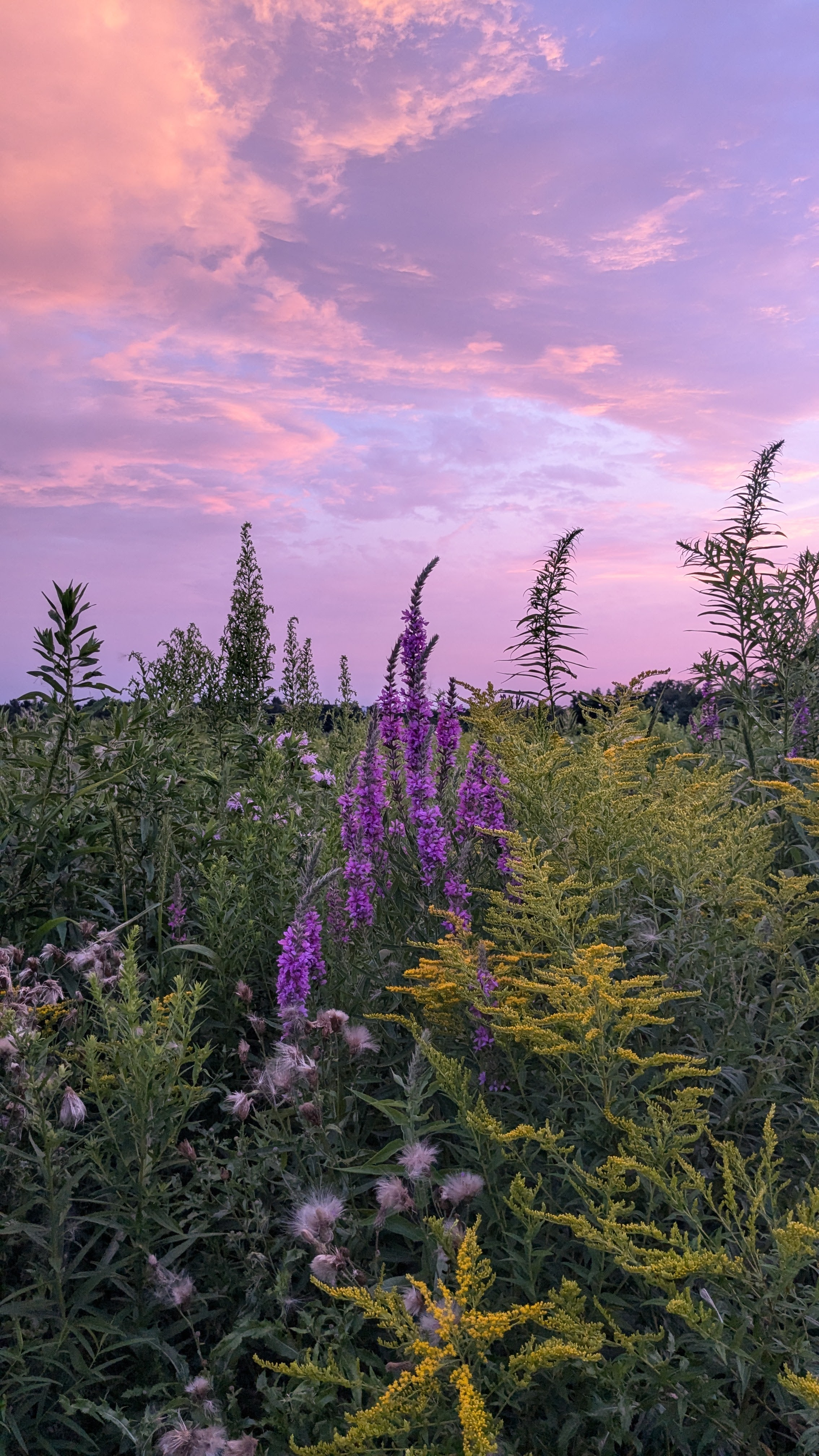
Mary Cummings Park At Sunset, 2024

At 216 acres (0.87 km^{2}), Mary Cummings Park is approximately the 12th largest public park in Greater Boston inside the I-95/Route 128 beltway.

Approximately 26 acres (110,000 m^{2}) were seized by eminent domain by the Federal Government during the Cold War for use as a nike missile site, which was subsequently bought by Northeastern University for their Burlington Campus.

The park is now managed by the Trustees of Reservation.

== Past Controversy ==
A substantial "Care and Maintenance" trust fund was left to the City of Boston along with the land. In a complaint to the Attorney General in 2008 it was alleged that in recent years funds were diverted from that purpose and used to pay for lawyers and real estate agents to prepare the land for sale. It was also alleged that approximately $15 million of the trust fund is unaccounted for.
