= Mary Lyon =

American educator (1797–1849)

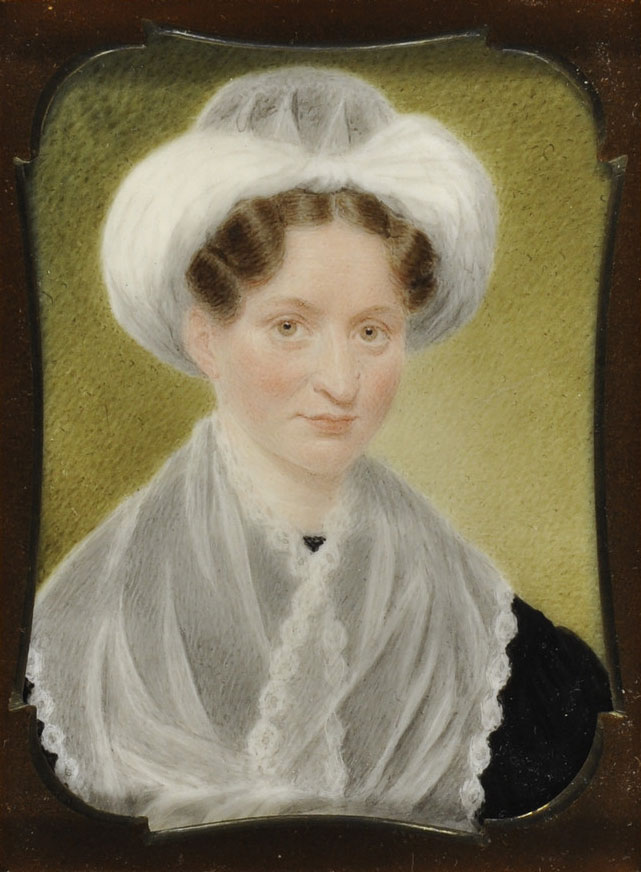
- Portrait of Mary Lyon, 1832

1st President of Mount Holyoke College (Founder and Principal)
- In office 1837–1849
- Succeeded by: Mary C. Whitman

Personal details
- Born: February 28, 1797 near Buckland, Massachusetts
- Died: March 5, 1849 (aged 52) South Hadley, Massachusetts
- Resting place: Mount Holyoke College

Mary Mason Lyon (/ˈlaɪ.ən/; February 28, 1797 – March 5, 1849) was an American pioneer in women's education. She advised on the establishment of Wheaton Female Seminary in Norton, Massachusetts, (Wheaton College) in 1834. She then established Mount Holyoke Female Seminary (Mount Holyoke College) in South Hadley, Massachusetts, in 1837 and served as its first president (or "principal") for 12 years. Lyon's vision fused intellectual challenge and moral purpose. She valued socioeconomic diversity and endeavored to make the seminary affordable for students of modest means.

== Early life ==
The daughter of a farming family in Buckland, Massachusetts, Lyon had a hardscrabble childhood. Her father died when she was five, and the entire family pitched in to help run the farm. Lyon was thirteen when her mother remarried and moved away; she stayed behind in Buckland in order to keep the house for her brother Aaron, who took over the farm. Lyon attended various district schools intermittently and, in 1814 at 17, began teaching in them as well, first invited to teach summer school. Lyon's modest beginnings fostered her lifelong commitment to extending educational opportunities to girls from middling and poor backgrounds.

Lyon was eventually able to attend two secondary schools, Sanderson Academy in Ashfield and Byfield Seminary in eastern Massachusetts. At Byfield, she was befriended by the headmaster, Rev. Joseph Emerson, and his assistant, Zilpah Polly Grant. She also soaked up Byfield's ethos of rigorous academic education infused with Christian commitment. Lyon then taught at several academies, including Sanderson, a small school of her own in Buckland, Adams Female Academy (run by Grant), and the Ipswich Female Seminary (also run by Grant). Lyon's attendance at the then novel, popular, lectures in laboratory botany by Amos Eaton influenced her involvement in the female seminary movement.

In 1834, Laban Wheaton and his daughter-in-law, Eliza Baylies Chapin Wheaton, called upon Mary Lyon for assistance in establishing the Wheaton Female Seminary (now Wheaton College) in Norton, Massachusetts. Lyon advised on the development of Wheaton. She created the first curriculum with the goal that it be equal in quality to those of men's colleges. She also provided the first principal, Eunice Caldwell. Wheaton Female Seminary opened on 22 April 1835, with 50 students and three teachers. During 1834, Lyon also left teaching at Ipswich Female Seminary and started to travel extensively in the region to raise funds, which she kept in a green velvet purse, for her own seminary for women. Lyon and Caldwell would eventually leave Wheaton, along with eight Wheaton students, to open Mount Holyoke Female Seminary.

== Mount Holyoke ==
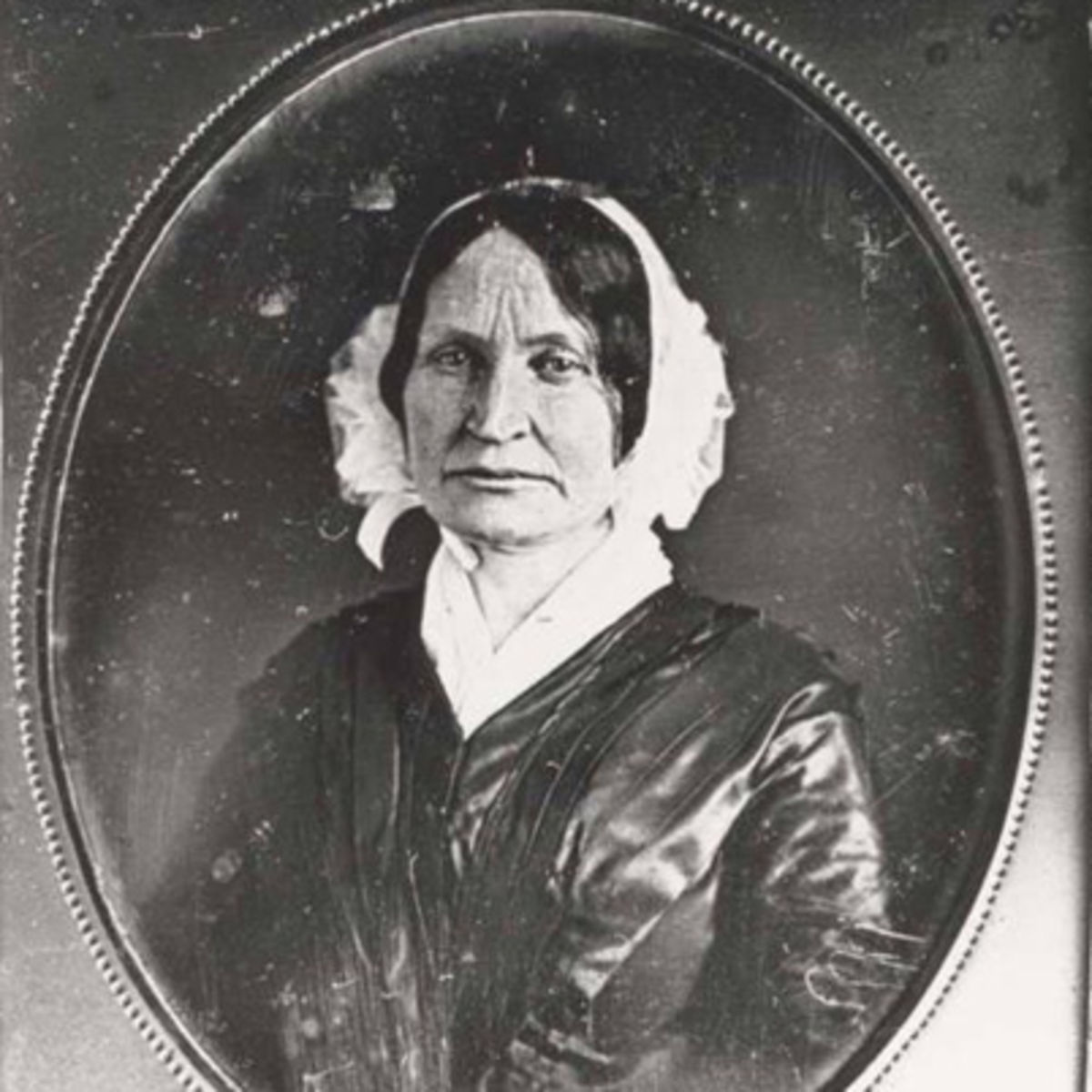
Lyon c. 1845

During these early years, Lyon gradually developed her vision for Mount Holyoke Female which would resemble Grant's schools in many respects but, Lyon hoped, draw its students from a wider socioeconomic range. The college was unique in that it was founded by people of modest means and served their daughters, rather than the children of the rich. She was especially influenced by Reverend Joseph Emerson, whose Discourse on Female Education (1822) advocated that women should be trained to be teachers rather than "to please the other sex."

Mount Holyoke opened in 1837: the seminary was ready for "the reception of scholars on November 8, 1837." Lyon strove to maintain high academic standards: she set rigorous entrance exams and admitted "young ladies of an adult age, and mature character."

In keeping with her social vision, she limited the tuition to $60/year, about one-third the tuition that Grant charged at Ipswich Female Seminary, which was central to her mission of "appeal[ing] to the intelligence of all classes." In order to keep costs low, Lyon required students to perform domestic tasks—an early version of work/study. These tasks included preparing meals and washing floors and windows. Emily Dickinson, who attended the Seminary in 1847, was tasked with cleaning knives. But this would not last. As of 2019, Mount Holyoke now estimates the cost of attending the college to be $71,828 per year. The college offers various forms of financial aid.

Lyon, an early believer in the importance of daily exercise for women, required her students to "walk one mile (1.6 km) after breakfast. During New England's cold and snowy winters, she reduced the requirement to 45 minutes. Calisthenics—a form of exercise—was taught by teachers in unheated hallways until a storage area was cleared for a gymnasium.

Though Lyon's policies were sometimes controversial, the seminary quickly attracted its target student body of 200. Lyon anticipated a change in the role of women and equipped her pupils with an education that was comprehensive, rigorous, and innovative, with particular emphasis on the sciences. She required:

seven courses in the sciences and mathematics for graduation, a requirement unheard of at other female seminaries. She introduced women to "a new and unusual way" to learn science—laboratory experiments which they performed themselves. She organized field trips on which students collected rocks, plants, and specimens for lab work, and inspected geological formations and recently discovered dinosaur tracks.

Lyon developed her ideas on how to educate women when she was assistant principal at Ipswich Female Seminary in Massachusetts. By 1837 she had convinced multiple sponsors to support her ideals and the nation's first real college for women. The town of South Hadley had donated the land and main building. Lyon's layout of the campus provided a widely imitated model for the higher education of women by providing a physical environment that supported a rigorous and comprehensive curriculum equivalent to that of men's colleges. Lyon's innovative goals set her Seminary apart from other female seminaries of the period, offering a curriculum equivalent to those at men's colleges. All the students worked in one building with little privacy. There was close contact with the all-female faculty, and daily self reports on their personal strengths and weaknesses. The college cut staff to the minimum as the 100 or so students each performed one hour of work a day, handling most of the routine chores like cooking and cleaning and maintaining the grounds. Lyon rejected the goal of the men's colleges to promote individualism and independence and instead fostered the collective ideal of a united team of women could match the success of nearby men's colleges like Amherst and Williams. The curriculum allowed women to study subjects like geometry, calculus, Latin, Greek, science, philosophy, and history, which were not typically taught at other female seminaries in the 19th century. Lyon's efforts in founding an institution of higher education for women, despite the economic challenges of the time, paved the way for more women to have the same opportunities for higher education as their brothers.

Mount Holyoke Female Seminary was one of several Christian institutions of higher education for young women established during the first half of the 19th century. Prior to founding Mount Holyoke, Lyon contributed to the development of both Hartford Female Seminary and Ipswich Female Seminary. She was also involved in the creation of Wheaton Female Seminary (now Wheaton College) in 1834. Mount Holyoke Female Seminary was chartered as a teaching seminary in 1836 and opened its doors to students on 8 November 1837. Both Vassar College and Wellesley College were patterned after Mount Holyoke.

According to historian Amanda Porterfield, Lyon created Mount Holyoke to be "a religious institution that offered a model of Christian society for all to see." Students "were required to attend church services, chapel talks, prayer meetings, and Bible study groups. Twice a day teachers and students spent time in private devotions. Every dorm room had two large lighted closets to give roommates privacy during their devotions". Mount Holyoke Female Seminary was the sister school to Andover Seminary. By 1859 there were more than 60 missionary alumnae; by 1887 the school's alumnae comprised one-fifth of all female American missionaries for the ABCFM; and by the end of the century, 248 of its alumnae had entered the mission field.

== Religion ==
Conforti (1993) examines the centrality of religion for Lyon. Raised a Baptist, she converted to Congregationalism under the influence of her teacher Reverend Joseph Emerson.

Lyon preached revivals at Mount Holyoke, spoke elsewhere, and, though not a minister, was a member of the fellowship of New England's New Divinity clergy. She played a major role in the revival of the thought of Jonathan Edwards, whose works were read more frequently then than in his own day. She was attracted by his ideals of self-restraint, self-denial, and disinterested benevolence.

== Death ==
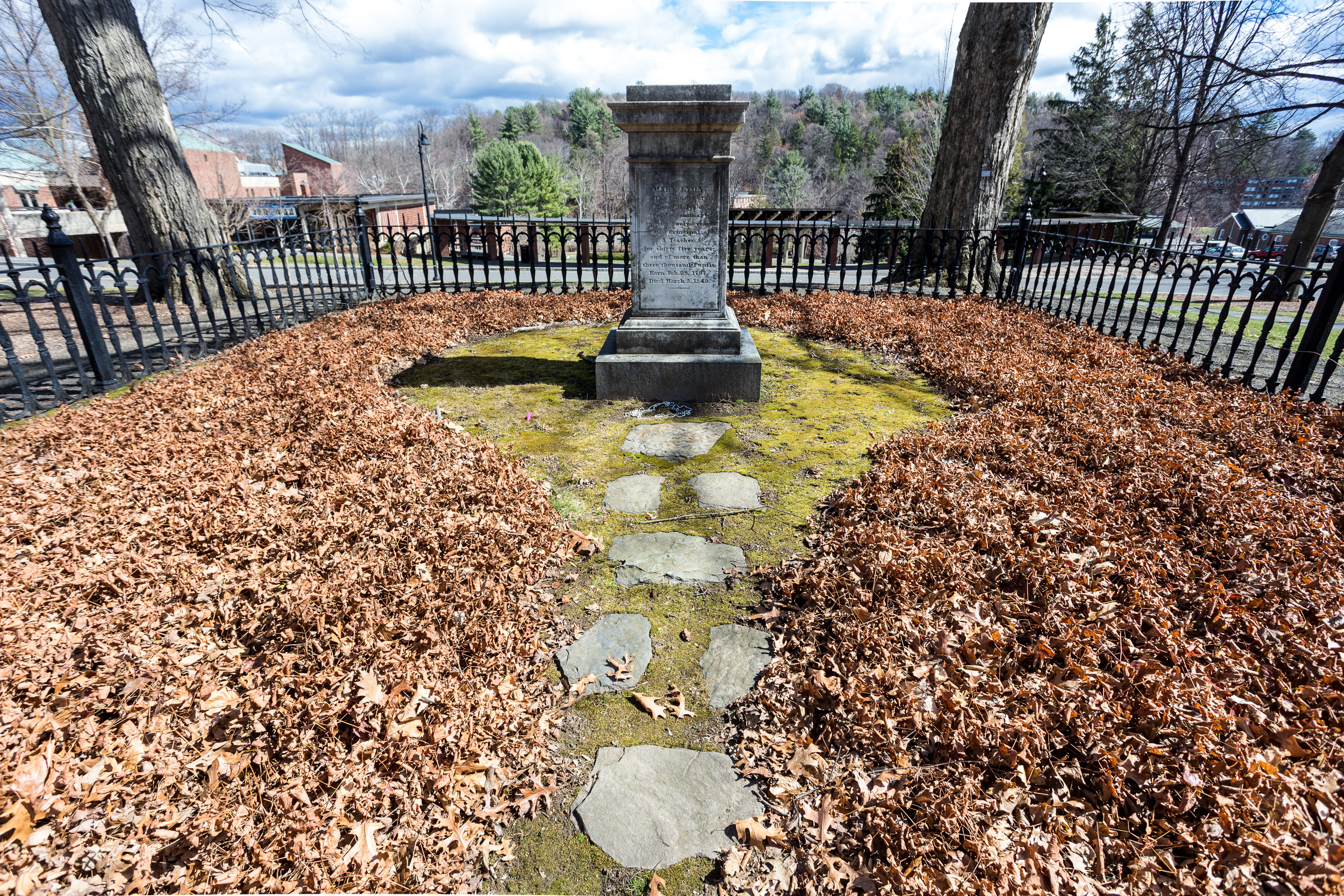
Mary Lyon's grave on the Mount Holyoke campus

Lyon died of erysipelas (contracted from an ill student in her care) on March 5, 1849. Lyon was buried on the Mount Holyoke College campus, in front of Porter Hall and behind the Amphitheatre. Her burial site is marked with a granite pillar and surrounded by an iron fence.

== Legacy ==
Mary Lyon developed her ideas on how to educate women when she was assistant principal at Ipswich Female Seminary in Massachusetts. When she was age 40 she had convinced sponsors to sponsor her new school—the first real college for women. Mount Holyoke Female Seminary opened on November 8, 1837, in South Hadley, Massachusetts. The town had donated the land and main building. Lyon's layout of the campus provided a widely imitated model for the higher education of women by providing a physical environment that supported a rigorous and comprehensive curriculum equivalent to that of men's colleges. Lyon's innovative goals set her Seminary apart from other female seminaries of the period, offering a curriculum equivalent to those at men's colleges. All the students worked in one building with little privacy. There was close contact with the all-female faculty, and daily self reports on their personal strengths and weaknesses. The college cut staff to the minimum as the 100 or so students each performed one hour of work a day, handling most of the routine chores like cooking and cleaning and maintaining the grounds. Lyon rejected the goal of the men's colleges to promote individualism and independence and instead fostered the collective ideal of a united team of women could match the success of nearby men's colleges like Amherst and Williams. The curriculum allowed women to study subjects like geometry, calculus, Latin, Greek, science, philosophy, and history, which were not typically taught at other female seminaries in the 19th century. Lyon's efforts in founding an institution of higher education for women, despite the economic challenges of the time, paved the way for more women to have the same opportunities for higher education as their brothers.

According to historian Annette Baxter, Lyon was devout, practical, and firmly committed to the educational orthodoxies of the era, while pioneering an entirely new role for women educators and students. She was adaptable and adventuresome, self-sufficient, and devoted to service. Her personal strengths reemerged in the foundations of Mount Holyoke Seminary. For example, it required all students to work, regardless of family wealth, which helped reduce costs, ensured equality on campus, and promoted responsibility for young women living away from home without servants for the first time in their lives. Attention to the curriculum as established by the leading men's colleges, was broadened by her promotion of Protestant missionary activism. The college's pedagogical approach stressed gradualism, expecting steady progress rather than sudden leaps forward. Her standard of achievement was much higher than the typical finishing school for young women, which was the main competition for the upscale Yankee clientele. Lyon's energetic, compassionate and engaging personality earned the affection of faculty, students, alumnae, and supporters. While her own background was relatively narrow, her aspirations for her students were to give them the self-confidence that they could achieve whatever they set out to do.

Many buildings have been named in her honor, including Mary Lyon Hall at Mount Holyoke College. Built in 1897 on the site of the former Seminary Building, the hall houses college offices, classrooms, and a chapel. Mount Holyoke College continues to honor her legacy through the commencement ceremonies held next to her gravesite. The main classroom building for Wheaton Female Seminary, originally called New Seminary Hall, was renamed Mary Lyon Hall in 1910 and still features prominently on the campus of Wheaton College. Dormitories named after Mary Lyon can also be found at Miami University, Plymouth State University in New Hampshire, Swarthmore College, and University of Massachusetts Amherst. Mary Lyon Elementary School in Tacoma, Washington is named after her. Lyon K–8 and the Mary Lyon Pilot High School in Boston, Massachusetts are named after her.

Vassar College, Wellesley College and the former Western College for Women were patterned after Mount Holyoke and Mary Lyon's work led to Ann Dudin Brown founding Westfield College in London. Oklahoma's Cherokee Female Seminary (now Northeastern State University) acquired its "first faculty for their female seminary from Mount Holyoke, [and] also used the Massachusetts school as a pattern for the institution they established."

In 1905, Lyon was inducted into the Hall of Fame for Great Americans in New York. In 1993, she was inducted into the National Women's Hall of Fame in Seneca Falls, New York.

She has been honored by the United States Postal Service with a 2¢ Great Americans series postage stamp.

== Notes ==
Academic offices
Preceded by New Position	President of Mount Holyoke College (Founder and Principal); 1837–1849	Succeeded by Mary C. Whitman
