= Zilpah P. Grant Banister =

American educator (1794–1884)

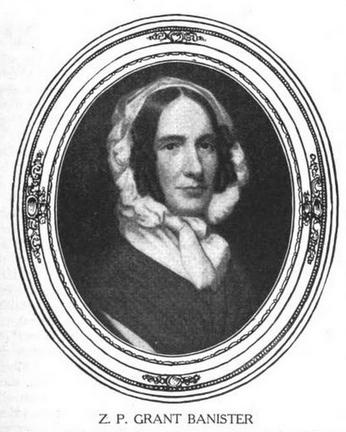
- Banister from a 1909 publication
- Born: Zilpah Grant; May 30, 1794
- Died: December 3, 1874 (aged 80)
- Occupation: Educator
- Known for: Founding Ipswich Female Seminary
- Spouse: William B. Banister (m. 1841)

Zilpah Polly Grant Banister (May 30, 1794 – December 3, 1874) was an American educator known primarily for founding Ipswich Female Seminary in Ipswich, Massachusetts, in 1828.

Zilpah Grant began teaching at the age of fifteen. Eventually she saved up enough money to enter Byfield Academy and study under the charismatic clergyman Joseph Emerson, a leading proponent of women's education. At Byfield, she befriended Mary Lyon, who later taught with Grant for several years.

In 1824 she established her own school. From 1824 to 1827 (or 1828), she served as principal of Adams Female Academy at Derry, New Hampshire. In 1828, Grant and Lyon, on the invitation of the trustees, transferred their school to Ipswich, and the Ipswich Female Seminary was founded. Grant's curricula at Adams and Ipswich reflected Emerson's influence; they blended rigorous academic studies, moral oversight, and teacher training. Grant expected students to study for the joy of learning, rather than working for grades or prizes. Mary Lyon was Grant's assistant and, later, principal at Ipswich until she left to found Mount Holyoke Seminary in 1835.

On September 7, 1841, Grant married William Bostwick Banister. She moved with him to Newburyport, Massachusetts. She continued to be active to promote women's education, and published a pamphlet entitled Hints on Education in 1856.

Her memoirs were published after her death.

Her letters are held at Mount Holyoke College.
