= Mount Holyoke College =

Private women's college in South Hadley, Massachusetts, US

- Former names: Mount Holyoke Female Seminary (1837–1888); Mount Holyoke Seminary and College (1888–1893)
- Motto: That our daughters may be as corner stones, polished after the similitude of a palace — Psalms 144:12
- Type: Private women's liberal arts college
- Established: Seminary, 1837 (seminary charter, 1836); Seminary and college, (collegiate charter) 1888; College, 1893
- Founder: Mary Lyon
- Accreditation: NECHE
- Academic affiliations: Annapolis Group; CIC; CLAC; COFHE; Five College; NAICU; Oberlin Group; Seven Sisters; Space-grant
- Endowment: $1.18 billion (2025)
- President: Danielle R. Holley
- Faculty: 218 full-time, 56 part-time (fall 2024)
- Administrative staff: 647 (fall 2021)
- Students: 2,275 (fall 2024)
- Undergraduates: 2,178 (fall 2024)
- Postgraduates: 97 (fall 2024)
- Location: South Hadley, Massachusetts, U.S. 42°15′20″N 72°34′28″W
- Campus: Rural, 2,000 acres (810 ha), academic campus: 1,000 acres (400 ha)
- Colors: Blue and white
- Nickname: Lyons
- Sporting affiliations: NCAA Division III; NEWMAC, Liberty League (golf)
- Mascots: Paws the Lion (Official); Jorge the Goose (Unofficial)
- Website: mtholyoke.edu

Mount Holyoke College is a private women's liberal arts college in South Hadley, Massachusetts, United States. It is the oldest member of the historic Seven Sisters colleges, a group of historically women's colleges in the Northeastern United States. The college was founded in 1837 as the Mount Holyoke Female Seminary by Mary Lyon, a pioneer in education for women. Mount Holyoke is part of the Five College Consortium in Western Massachusetts.

Undergraduate admissions are restricted to female, transgender, and nonbinary students. In 2014, it became the first member of the Seven Sisters (not counting the coeducational Vassar College) to introduce an admissions policy that was inclusive of transgender students. Graduate programs are open to applicants regardless of gender.

The college's 800-acre (3.2 km^{2}) campus includes the Mount Holyoke College Art Museum, the John Payson Williston Observatory, Joseph Allen Skinner Museum, and a botanic garden. The college awards the Glascock Prize annually.

== History ==
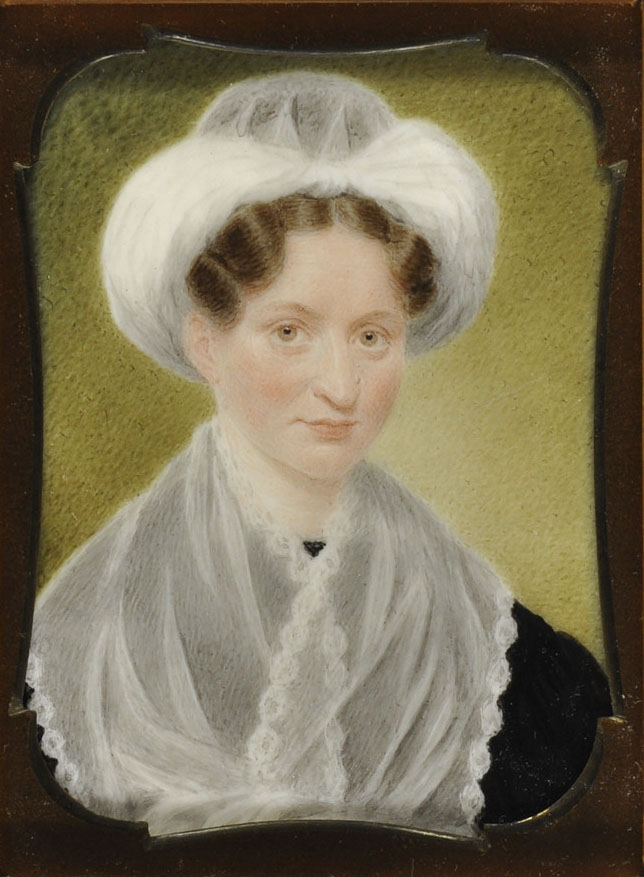
Mary Lyon ivory miniature

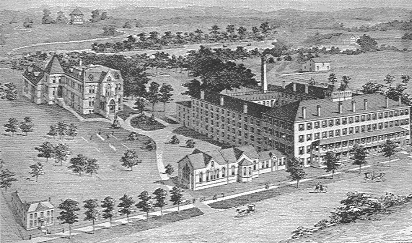
Mount Holyoke Female Seminary in 1837

Mount Holyoke was founded in 1837 by Mary Lyon as "Mount Holyoke Female Seminary." Lyon developed her ideas on how to educate women when she was assistant principal at Ipswich Female Seminary in Massachusetts.

By 1837 she had convinced multiple sponsors to support her ideals and the nation's first real college for women. Mount Holyoke Female Seminary opened on November 8, 1837, in South Hadley, Massachusetts. The town had donated the land and main building. Lyon's layout of the campus provided a widely imitated model for the higher education of women by providing a physical environment that supported a rigorous and comprehensive curriculum equivalent to that of men's colleges. Lyon's innovative goals set her Seminary apart from other female seminaries of the period, offering a curriculum equivalent to those at men's colleges. All the students worked in one building with little privacy. There was close contact with the all-female faculty and daily self reports on their personal strengths and weaknesses. The college cut staff to the minimum as the 100 or so students each performed one hour of work a day, handling most of the routine chores like cooking and cleaning and maintaining the grounds.

Lyon rejected the goal of the men's colleges to promote individualism and independence and instead fostered the collective ideal of a united team of women could match the success of nearby men's colleges like Amherst and Williams. The curriculum allowed women to study subjects like geometry, calculus, Latin, Greek, science, philosophy, and history, which were not typically taught at other female seminaries in the 19th century. Lyon's efforts in founding an institution of higher education for women, despite the economic challenges of the time, paved the way for more women to have the same opportunities for higher education as their brothers.

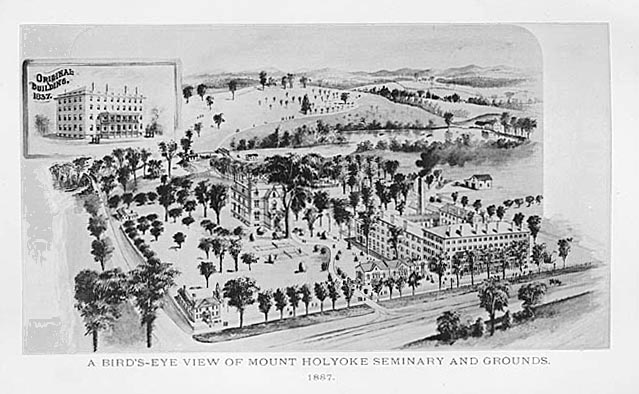
Mount Holyoke in 1887

Mount Holyoke Female Seminary was one of several Christian institutions of higher education for young women established during the first half of the 19th century. Prior to founding Mount Holyoke, Lyon contributed to the development of both Hartford Female Seminary and Ipswich Female Seminary. She was also involved in the creation of Wheaton Female Seminary (now Wheaton College) in 1834. Mount Holyoke Female Seminary was chartered as a teaching seminary in 1836 and opened its doors to students on November 8, 1837. Both Vassar College and Wellesley College were patterned after Mount Holyoke.

According to historian Amanda Porterfield, Lyon created Mount Holyoke to be "a religious institution that offered a model of Christian society for all to see." Students "were required to attend church services, chapel talks, prayer meetings, and Bible study groups. Twice a day teachers and students spent time in private devotions. Every dorm room had two large lighted closets to give roommates privacy during their devotions". Mount Holyoke Female Seminary was the sister school to Andover Seminary. By 1859 there were more than 60 missionary alumnae, by 1887 the school's alumnae comprised one-fifth of all female American missionaries for the ABCFM, and by the end of the century, 248 of its alumnae had entered the mission field.

=== Collegiate charter ===
Mount Holyoke Female Seminary received its collegiate charter in 1888, becoming "Mount Holyoke Seminary and College." The change in admission from Seminary to College included fundraising by the trustees, an overhaul of the entrance requirements, and course catalog. Entrance exams were introduced at this time, scheduled in June or September at the college. In 1889, students traveling from the midwest could take these examinations in Freeport, Illinois, and within a few years, this was expanded to other cities. Many additions were made to the course catalog, and starting in the 1889 academic year, students could choose to pursue degrees of Bachelor of Arts or Bachelor of Science. Within 4 years, the seminary enrollment dropped from 269 to 8. In 1893, the seminary course was discontinued, and the new title "Mount Holyoke College" was authorized.

=== Cottage-style living ===
A movement towards what was referred to as cottage-style living started in 1889 by the New York Association after the change to Mount Holyoke Seminary and College. $15,000 was raised, and plans were put in place for Mary Brigham Cottage, with accommodations for the president and thirty students, with priority given to those in the collegiate course. At the time, two South Hadley families agreed to host boarders. President Elizabeth Mead deemed these options unsatisfactory and pushed the trustees to build yet another cottage. Mrs. Mead was ready to relieve the students of a large share of the drudgery of domestic work that had made up a good portion of their studies since Mary Lyon's conception of the seminary. From 1895 to 1996 the trustees allotted funds for the employment of four women to wash the dinner dishes that had formerly constituted the task of eight or ten students.

On February 28, 1987, the United States Postal Service's Great Americans series issued a postage stamp featuring Mary Lyon, in honor of Mount Holyoke's Sesquicentennial (Mount Holyoke's 150th anniversary).

=== Debate on becoming co-educational ===
In the early 1970s, Mount Holyoke had a long debate under the presidency of David Truman over the issue of coeducation. On November 6, 1971, the board of trustees voted to remain a women's college.

=== Admission of transgender students ===
At Convocation on September 2, 2014, President Lynn Pasquerella announced a new policy allowing the admission of transgender and non-binary students to the college. Of the Seven Sisters that had remained women's colleges, Mount Holyoke was the first to implement such policy.

== Admissions ==
The 2020 annual ranking by U.S. News & World Report categorizes Mount Holyoke as "more selective".

For the Class of 2028 (enrolling fall 2024), Mount Holyoke received 5,226 applications, accepted 1,881 (36%), and enrolled 532. The middle 50% range of SAT scores for enrolled students was 1360–1470 for the composite, 690–750 for evidence-based reading and writing, and 660–750 for math, while the middle 50% range for the ACT composite score was 31–33.

== Rankings ==
Academic rankings

Liberal arts
- U.S. News & World Report: 29
- Washington Monthly: 16

National
- Forbes: 244
- WSJ/College Pulse: 282

U.S. News & World Report's 2026 rankings ranked Mount Holyoke as the 29th-best liberal arts college in the nation, and tied for 21st for "Best Undergraduate Teaching." In 2023, according to a ranking by the Princeton Review which assessed students' perceptions of their faculty, Mount Holyoke's faculty was ranked #9 in the nation, while the campus was ranked #2. The ranking was based on students' level of agreement or disagreement with the statement, "Professors are interesting and bring their material to life." As of 2023, Mount Holyoke was ranked #6 in the Princeton Review's ranking of the "Top 20 Best Schools for Making an Impact."

Forbes ranked Mount Holyoke 244th out of the top 500 rated private and public colleges and universities in America for the 2024–25 report. Mount Holyoke was also ranked 134th among private colleges and 88th in the northeast.

Mount Holyoke College is accredited by the New England Commission of Higher Education.

In 2025, the college ranked 205 out of 257 top colleges in a free speech ranking by the Foundation for Individual Rights and Expression and "College Pulse," after ranking at 155 in 2024 and 159 in 2022/2023.

== Academics ==
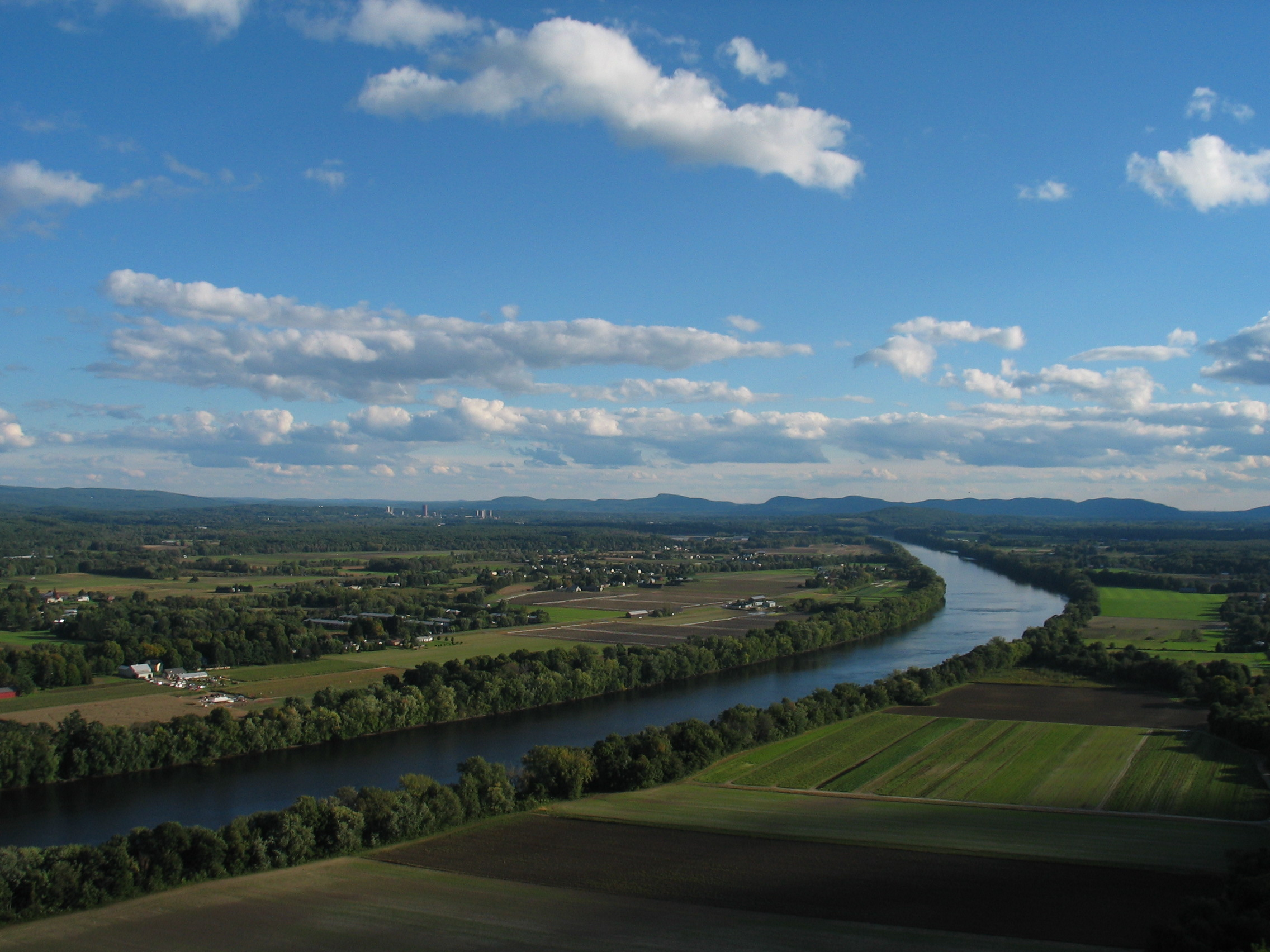
The Pioneer Valley and Connecticut River

=== Undergraduate programs ===
Mount Holyoke offers 50 departmental and interdepartmental majors, including the option to design a special major. Many students double-major, or complete two majors. In 2021, 47% of Mathematics majors, 38% of Environmental science majors, and 44% of English majors had a second major. The most popular undergraduate first majors (omitting second majors), based on 407 graduates in 2024, were:

Psychology (46)
Computer Science (39)
Biological Sciences (39)
English (30)
Economics (23)
Politics (21)
Film, Media, Theater (22)
Environmental Sciences (20)†
† This major stopped being offered to new students in fall 2023. It was mergered with geology and geography.

The primary degree conferred is the Bachelor of Arts (BA) degree, for which students complete 128-semester credits (one standard course equals 4 credits). At least 68 credits must be earned from coursework outside the major department, across the three curricular divisions: humanities, science and mathematics, and social sciences. Study of a foreign language and completion of a multicultural perspectives course is also required.

In 2025, the largest percentage of degrees conferred (20.2%) were Bachelors of Arts in Social Sciences.† The other popular degrees included:

- 12.1%, BA in Biological Sciences
- 10.0%, BA in Film, Media, Theater
- 7.2%, BA in Psychology
- 6.4%, BA in English
- 6.4%, BA in a Foreign Language (Spanish, French, Italian, German, Japanese, etc.)
- 5.9%, BA in Computer Science
- 5.2%, BA in Physical Sciences
- 4.6%, BA in Gender Studies or Critical Race and Political Economy
- 4.6%, BA in Mathematics and Statistics

† These statistics count each major for a double major as a separate degree.

Non-traditional students, aged 25+ or under 24 with children, who wish to complete the requirements for a Bachelor of Arts degree and have previous college credits can apply to be Frances Perkins Scholar. The program provides financial support and specialized housing to its 25 students.

Mount Holyoke's membership in the Five College Consortium allows students to enroll in courses at nearby Amherst College, Smith College, Hampshire College, and the University of Massachusetts Amherst. They may also complete one of 12 Five College Certificates—among them African studies, Buddhist studies, coastal and marine sciences, cognitive neuroscience, international relations, and Middle Eastern studies—in lieu of a minor. Hampshire College announced it will close at the end of 2026.

Bachelor of science degrees can be conferred for a dual-degree program. These programs include dual-degree programs in engineering with the California Institute of Technology, the Thayer School of Engineering at Dartmouth College, and the University of Massachusetts Amherst; and the Postbaccalaureate Studies Program, for students who have already earned an undergraduate degree and wish to complete additional course work in preparation for graduate work in medicine, nursing, veterinary medicine, dentistry, or physical therapy science.

=== Graduate programs ===
In addition to the BA, Mount Holyoke offers three master's degrees: a coed Master of Arts in Teaching, a Master of Arts in mathematics teaching, and a master's in psychology. Mount Holyoke announced in October 2025 that they would be ending their professional and graduate degree programs.

== Academic centers and programs ==
Four academic centers—the Weissman Center for Leadership, the McCulloch Center for Global Initiatives, the Miller Worley Center for the Environment, and the Intergroup Dialogue Center—support the academic program through public lectures by visiting scholars, conferences on issues of pressing concern, mentoring and internship opportunities, and hands-on learning experiences. The Weissman Center's Speaking, Arguing, and Writing (SAW) Program provides opportunities for developing leadership and communication skills, including the ability to effectively frame, articulate, and advocate positions. The Community-Based Learning Program links students with community-based organizations in courses that combine analysis and action.

=== Study abroad ===
Mount Holyoke has study abroad programs and exchanges for full-year or semester study in France, Senegal, Costa Rica, Chile, Hong Kong, Japan, South Korea, Germany, Spain, and the United Kingdom, as well as a summer program in China and January term programs in Georgia and South Africa. The college is also affiliated with more than 150 study abroad programs in more than 50 colleges and students have the opportunity to petition any programs with which the college is not already affiliated. The college also encourages international internships and research for the semester, year, summer, or January terms. Each year more than 200 Mount Holyoke students, representing approximately 40 percent of the junior class, study for a semester or academic year at universities and programs abroad.

=== Twelve College Exchange ===
Through the school's membership in the Twelve College Exchange program, Mount Holyoke students can study at one of the following 12 other schools for one semester or a full year:

- Amherst College
- Bowdoin College
- Connecticut College
- Dartmouth College
- National Theatre Institute at the Eugene O'Neill Theater Center
- Smith College
- Trinity College
- Vassar College
- Wellesley College
- Wesleyan University
- Wheaton College
- Williams/Mystic Seaport Program in Maritime Studies

== Faculty ==
A number of faculty are nationally and internationally recognized for their research and writing achievements, including Christopher Benfey (literary scholar), Joseph Ellis (historian), Susan Barry (neurobiologist), Mark McMenamin (geologist and paleontologist) and Becky Wai-Ling Packard (psychologist).

=== Attempted murder of faculty member ===
Mount Holyoke administrator and art professor Rie Hachiyanagi made international headlines when she was charged with the attempted murder of another faculty member on December 23, 2019. Hachiyanagi used a fire poker, large rock, and gardening shears to attack her victim, who survived. Hachiyanagi pled guilty to the charges and on October 20, 2021, was sentenced to a 10- to 12-year prison term.

== Campus ==
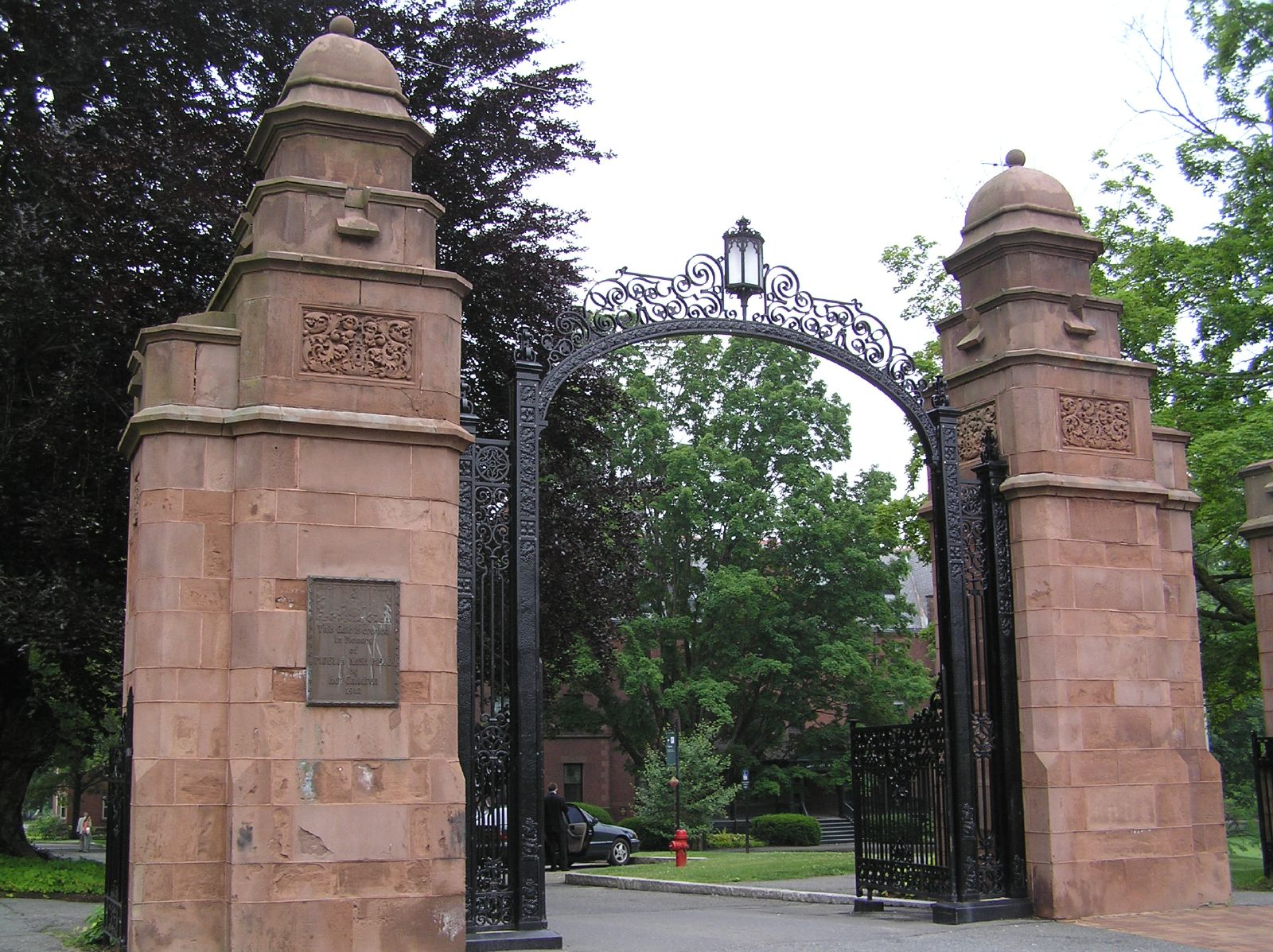
The main campus gate on College St

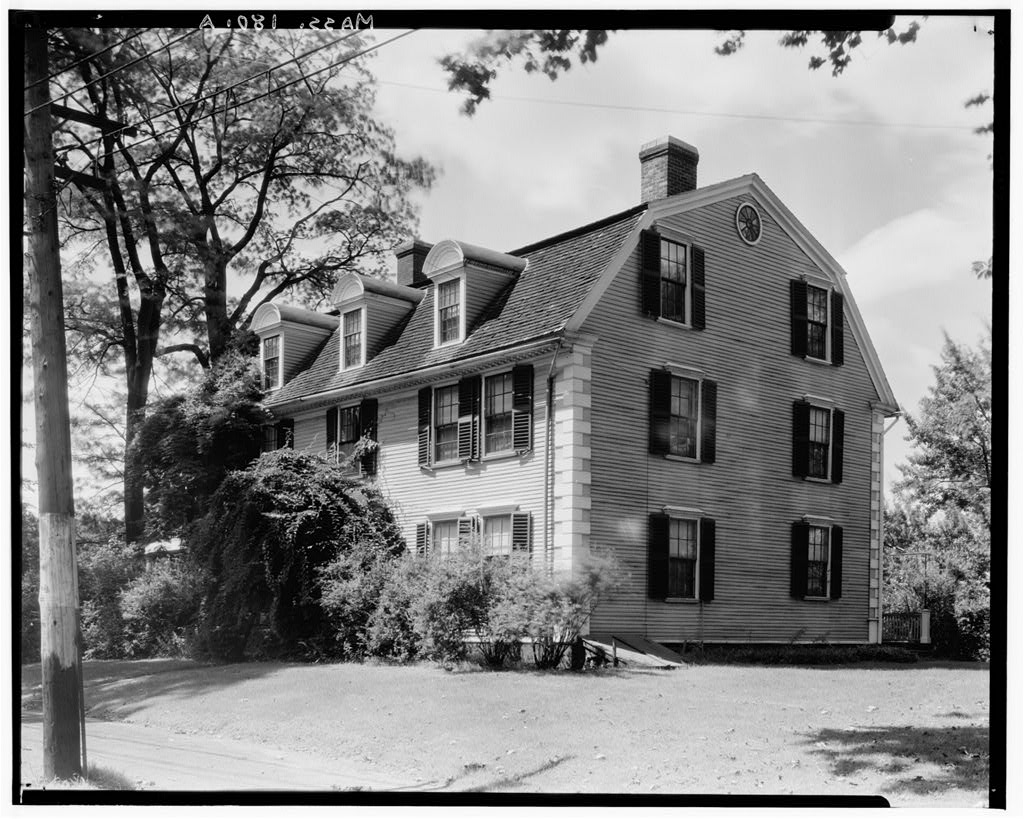
Home of Benjamin Ruggles Woodbridge, 'Sycamores', a former dormitory for the college

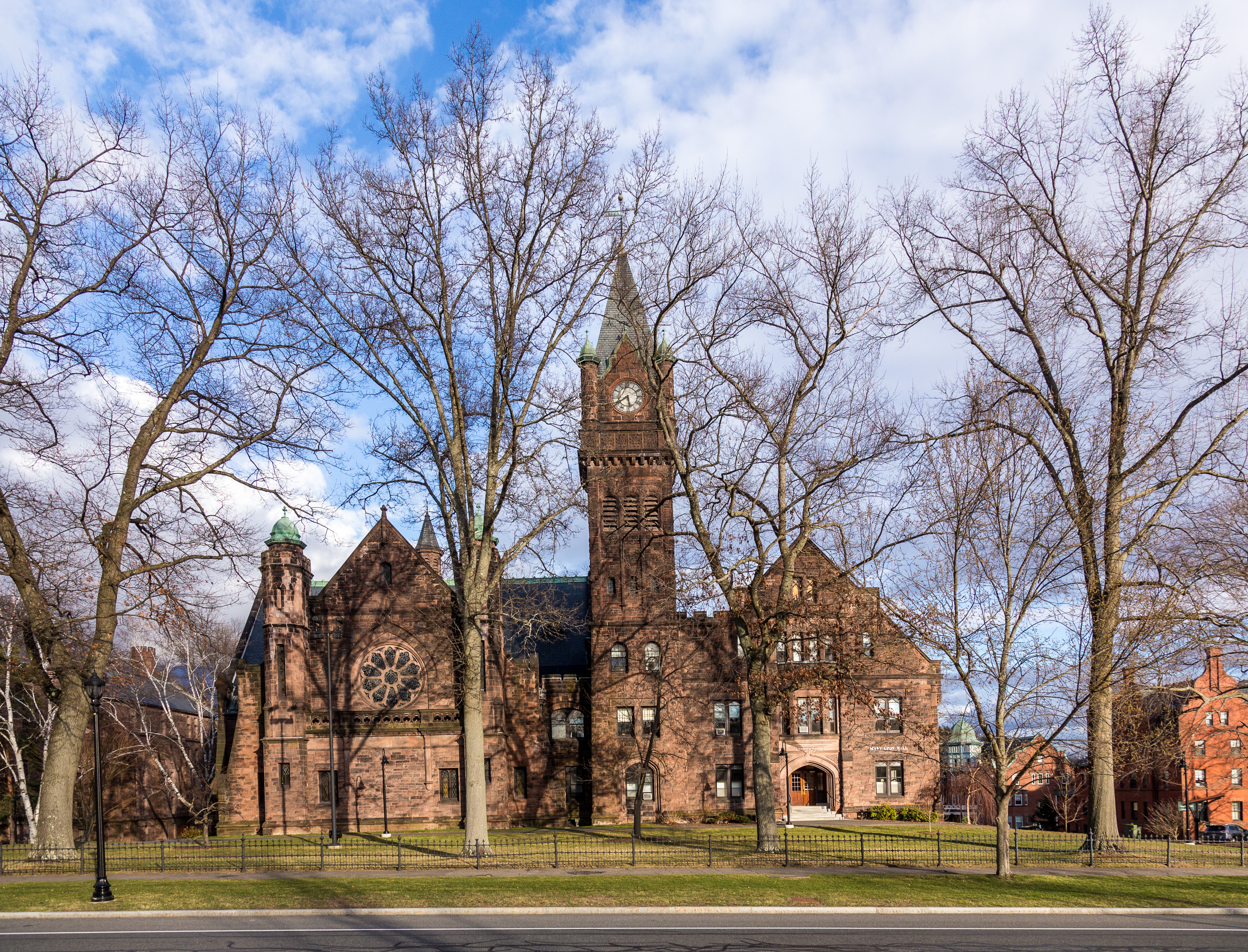
Mary Lyon Hall, 2016

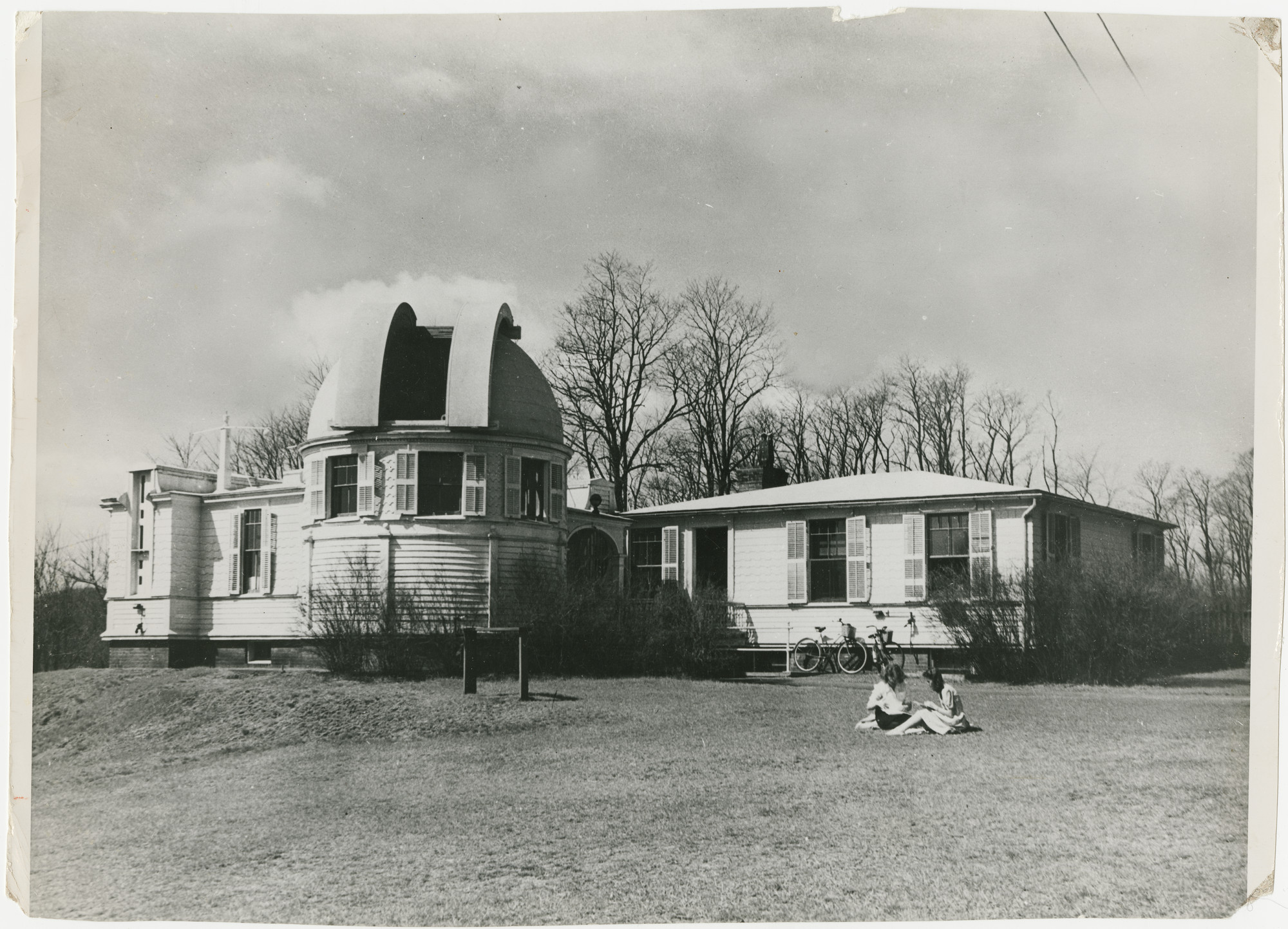
John Payson Williston Observatory, Mount Holyoke College, c. 1945–1955

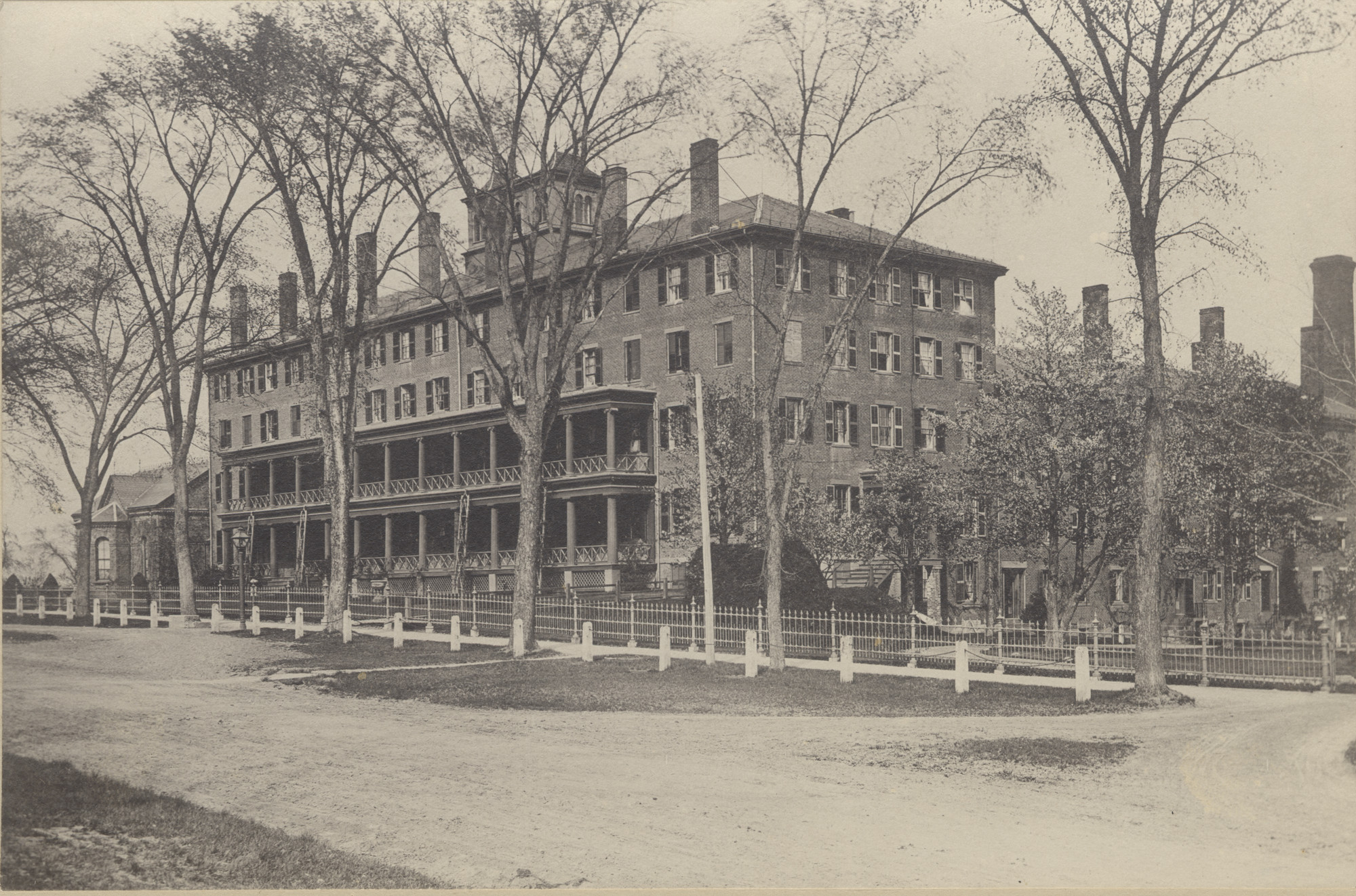
Seminary Building, Mount Holyoke Female Seminary, viewed from the southwest, South Hadley, Massachusetts, 1886

The 800-acre (3.2 km^{2}) campus was designed and landscaped between 1896 and 1922 by the landscape architecture firm of Olmsted and Sons. The campus includes a botanic garden, two lakes, several waterfalls, tennis courts, stables, and woodland riding trails. It is also home to the Mount Holyoke College Art Museum which is part of the Five College Museums/Historic Deerfield and the Museums10.

An independent bookstore, The Odyssey Bookshop, is located directly across from the campus in the college-owned Village Commons. Mount Holyoke has instituted "The Big Turn Off" energy conservation campaign. It also focuses on "green" building with five LEED certified buildings on campus. It has reduced its environmental impact by recycling 40% of waste and composting as well as using produce grown in the student-run organic garden in dining halls.

The Seminary Building (1837) contained classrooms, parlors and rooms for students and faculty, the original library, and a periodical reading room. A south wing was added in 1841, a north wing in 1853, and a gymnasium and laundry in 1865. All were destroyed by fire in 1896. Upon the burning of the college building in September 1896, Treasurer Williston announced the pressing need for a new chapel building, a new gymnasium, and a series of cottage dormitories in the modern style. This style of separated buildings allowed for flexibility in fundraising that was attractive to the trustees, while still providing the students with the resources and accommodations they needed. In 1897, Mary Lyon Hall and Mary Lyon Chapel were built, as well as dormitories Brigham, Safford, Porter, and Pearsons. Blanchard Gymnasium was completed in 1899.

John Payson Williston Observatory, completed in 1881, was given in memory of the Willistons' eldest son and built to be ready for the rare transit of Venus in 1882. It is the oldest academic building on campus.

Mount Holyoke has been recognized for its campus beauty by Huffington Post, The Princeton Review, and Architectural Digest. Its oldest building dated back to the school's opening in 1837, but it burned down in 1896 and was replaced by buildings that opened the following year. Additional buildings were constructed, remodeled, torn down, and expanded at various points from the 1870s to the 2010s, most recently with a new residence hall in 2008 and the construction of a centralized dining hall in 2018. The school owns an 18-hole golf course, The Orchards, which was designed by Donald Ross and which hosted the U.S. Women's Open in 2004.

== Williston Library ==
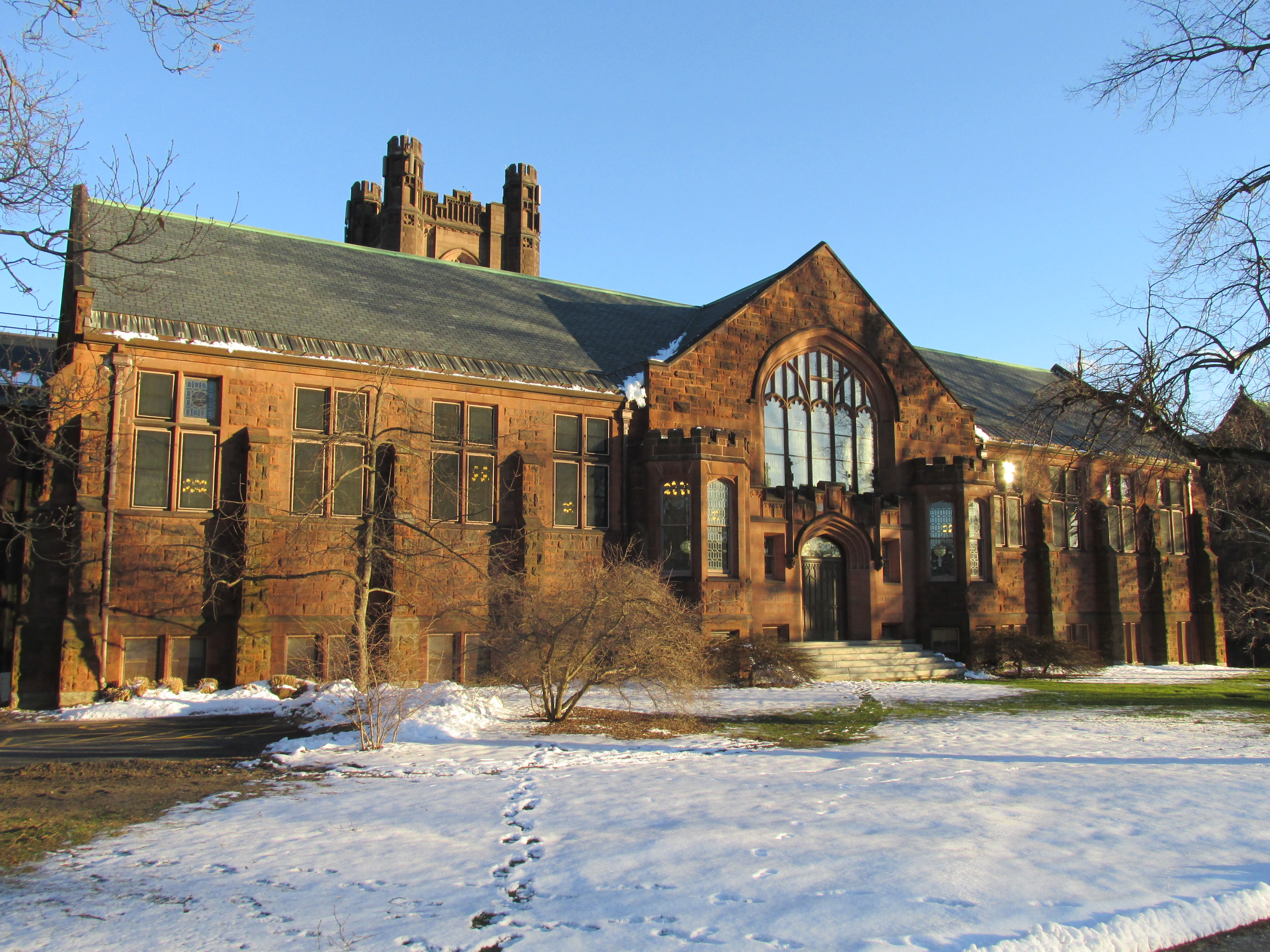
Williston Library, Mount Holyoke College, South Hadley, Massachusetts

Mount Holyoke's library includes more than 740,000 print volumes, 1,600 periodicals, and more than 140,000 electronic resources. Its first librarian was an alumna Mary Nutting. Through the Five College Consortium, students have access to more than 9 million volumes. Computer support is provided. The MEWS (Mediated Educational Work Space) supports collaborative multimedia learning with group project rooms, wall-mounted plasma displays, a digitization center, and a faculty development area. In 2013, "Clear and Gold Tower," a glass sculpture by Dale Chihuly, was installed in the Williston Library's atrium.

== Dormitories ==
The college has 21 residence halls as well as apartments and "annex" spaces in which to house students, and an overwhelming majority of students live on campus (98%). Each residence hall reserves a quarter of its rooms for housing first-year students. Most residence halls house students from all four class years at any given time. In January 2018, Mount Holyoke opened a new centralized dining commons within the previously existing Blanchard Community Center. Previously, six dormitories on campus had dining areas inside of them, but the plan to consolidate these into one dining hall was made so that the college could shift to accept an unlimited meal plan and offer extended hours.

== Memberships ==
Mount Holyoke is a member of the Pioneer Valley's Five College Consortium, the Consortium of Liberal Arts Colleges, the Annapolis Group, the Oberlin Group, Twelve College Exchange Program, and the Consortium on Financing Higher Education.

== Student demographics ==
In 2023, Mount Holyoke's undergraduate student body was 50% white, 22% international, 7% Asian, 9% Hispanic, 5% black, and 5% multiracial.

=== Student groups ===
Mount Holyoke offers a number of student groups and organizations. Themes include Art, Academics, Club Sports, Entertainment & the Performing Arts, Politics & Activism, Governing Organizations and Religious organizations.

Among these student groups is Mount Holyoke News, the college's independent, student-run publication which has been in print since 1917. Mount Holyoke News, or MHN, publishes on a biweekly basis throughout the academic year with new issues going out in print form every other Friday. A digital edition of each issue is also made available online through the publishing platform Issuu.

WMHC (91.5 FM) is a radio station licensed to serve South Hadley, Massachusetts. The station is owned by Mount Holyoke College and is one of the oldest stations run by women.

== Traditions ==
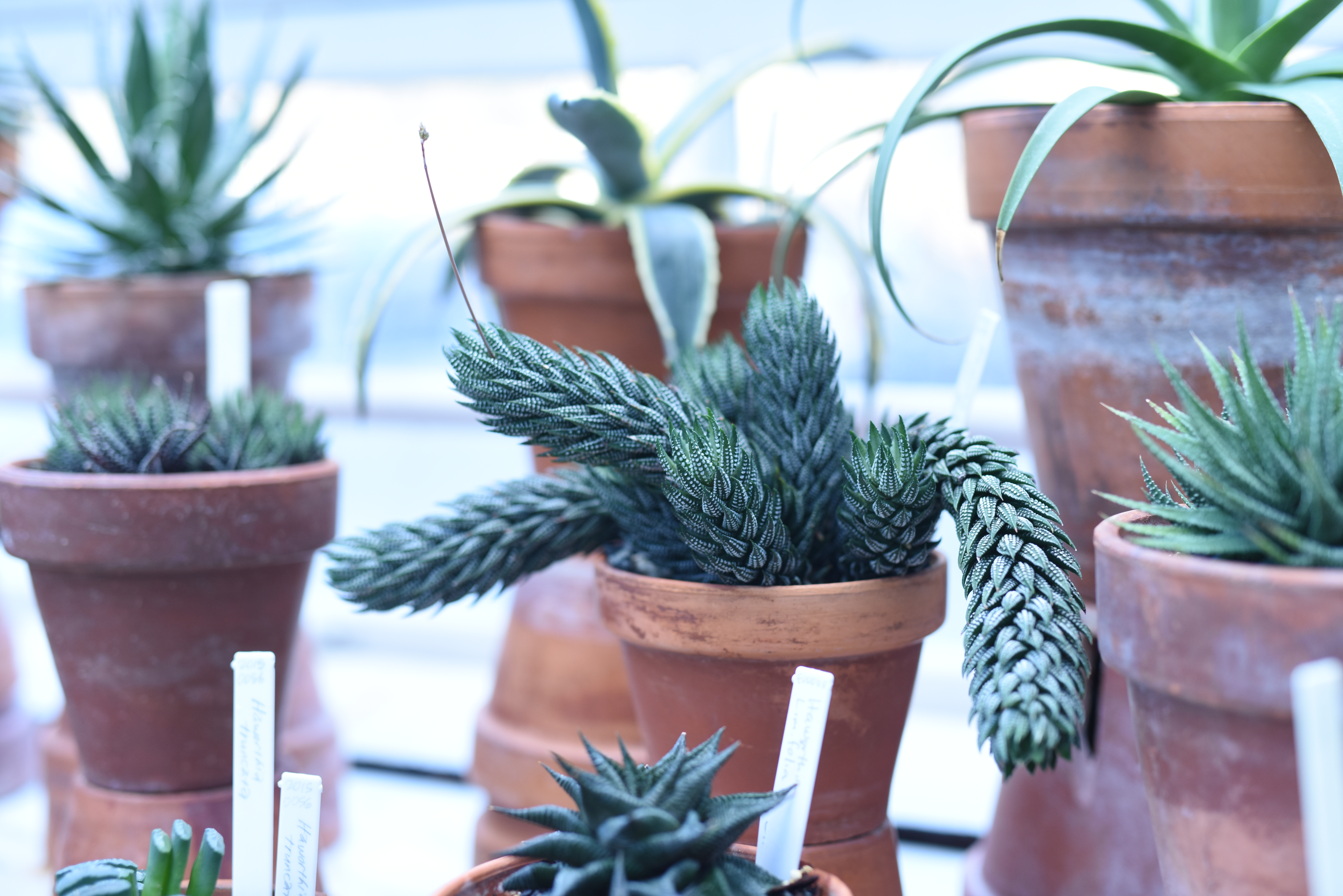
It is a tradition to give incoming Freshmen a plant from the Talcott Greenhouse.

=== Events ===
- The Kathryn Irene Glascock Awards grants The Glascock Prize to the winner of this annual event (which has been held at Mount Holyoke since 1924).
- The Faculty Show takes place once every four years, around April 1; faculty members create a show which parodies themselves and their students.
- The Junior Show (also known as J-Show) refers to a show created by Juniors (and a few professors) who parody life at Mount Holyoke. A common feature is a sketch mocking the president and dean of the college, along with well-known professors.
- Mountain Day begins with the sound of ringing bells from Abbey Chapel on a beautiful autumn morning secretly chosen by the president of the college, all classes are canceled for the day and many students hike to the summit of nearby Mount Holyoke.
- Holiday Vespers is an annual Christmas concert that has been held each year since 1899. In addition to the free performance held on campus in Abbey Chapel, each year the students perform in either Boston or New York City.
- M&Cs, originally called Milk & Crackers, is now referred to as Milk & Cookies. M&Cs are a nightly snack provided by dormitory dining halls, but also refer to a student a cappella group, The M&Cs (Milk and Cookies).
- Big/Little Sibling is a reference to the pairing of juniors and "firsties" (or first-years) who are paired up to take part in organized events together. Coordinated by the junior class board.
- Pangy Day, originally called Pangynaskeia, has been a springtime tradition at Mount Holyoke for decades, but its origin is not totally clear. It's about celebrating spring after a long winter, and festivities including maypoles, farm animals, Morris dancers, music, games, face-painting, ice cream, and more take place.
- Elfing is a tradition shared between sophomores and first-years. Secret sophomore "elves" leave presents and treats for their first years throughout the week-long event. On the final day, the first-years get to meet their elves in person at a special M&Cs.
- Gracious Dinner (formerly Gracious Living) is a candle-lit dinner held twice every semester. In recent years, a new menu of local food is provided in a decor-filled dining hall.
- Founder's Day is held on the Sunday closest to 8 November (the date of the opening of Mount Holyoke in 1837). It was begun by Elizabeth Storrs Mead in 1891. The current version of the tradition includes ice cream being served early in the morning near Mary Lyon's grave. The current president of the college and select faculty are invited to scoop ice cream for the senior class who dons their gowns.
- Convocation is a spirited celebration of community marking the beginning of the academic year. All students attend wearing their class colors, and seniors wear their graduation gowns to celebrate the start of their final year.
- Canoe Sing is an event that takes place prior to commencement in which canoes are decorated with lanterns and paddled by seniors singing Mount Holyoke songs. They are joined by fellow graduating seniors on shore.
- Baccalaureate is held in Abbey Chapel; the medieval German ode to Academe, "Gaudeamus Igitur", is sung by berobed Seniors and Faculty during the procession. Following convocation, Faculty line the path to Mary Lyon's grave. Seniors walk through this throng, to the grave (to place a wreath). The Baccalaureate Ceremony is a celebration that honors members of the graduating class. This traditional ceremony is for seniors only and holds a deep meaning: students are given a final charge and hear from their selected faculty and classmates. Academic regalia and a cap is worn.
- The Laurel Parade takes place the day before commencement. Graduating seniors wear white and carry laurel garlands, in a parade to Mary Lyon's grave. They are escorted by approximately 3,000 alumnae, also in white, who thereby welcome them into the Alumnae Association. Once at Mary Lyon's grave, the garland is wound around the cast-iron fence, and the Mimi Fariña song "Bread and Roses" is sung by all in attendance. White is a tribute to those who fought for women's suffrage. In 1970 students voted to replace the laurel with signs protesting the Vietnam War.

== Mascots ==
Mount Holyoke College's official mascot used by its athletic teams is Paws, a lion. Additionally, Mount Holyoke's unofficial mascot is Jorge, a pilgrim goose that lived on campus from the 1990s until his death in 2024.

Mount Holyoke also uses four separate mascots to represent its different classes: Blue Lion, Green Griffin, Red Pegasus, and Yellow Sphinx. Mount Holyoke classes have been voting on class colors and mascots since the late 19th century, but the colors and animals currently used were not adopted until the early 1900s The Purple Phoenix mascot has also been used to represent France Perkins Scholars (non-traditional age students), and Teal Owls to represent graduate students. Each class displays their class color at class-related activities such as Convocation.

== Athletics ==
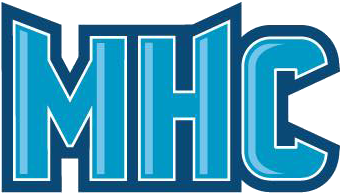
Mount Holyoke athletics wordmark

Mount Holyoke's teams are nicknamed the Lyons. The college offers 13 varsity sports programs and six competitive club sports teams. Mount Holyoke is a member of the National Collegiate Athletic Association (NCAA) Division III and the New England Women's and Men's Athletic Conference (NEWMAC) as well as the New England Rowing Conference (NERC).

Facilities include a lighted synthetic multipurpose turf field surrounded by an eight-lane track with a nine-lane straightaway; Kendall Sports and Dance Complex housing a swimming pool and separate diving well; gymnasium with basketball, volleyball, and badminton courts; weight room; cardiovascular area; one-acre (4,000 m^{2}) field house with indoor track and tennis courts; squash courts; racquetball courts; and three studios for dance, aerobics, yoga, and other activities; The Orchards, an 18-hole golf course (home to the 2004 U.S. Women's Open) designed by Donald Ross; and a 60-stall equestrian center with two indoor arenas (100' × 256' and 70' × 130'), an outdoor show ring, permanent fibar dressage arena, outdoor cross-country courses, and a boathouse finished for Spring 2010.

== Notable people ==
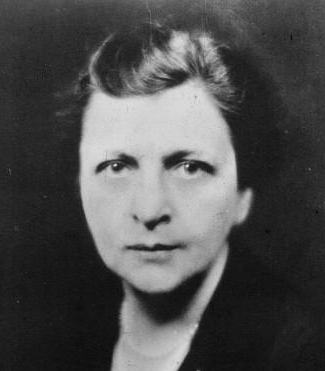
Frances Perkins, U.S. Secretary of Labor under Franklin D. Roosevelt, first woman to hold a U.S. Cabinet position

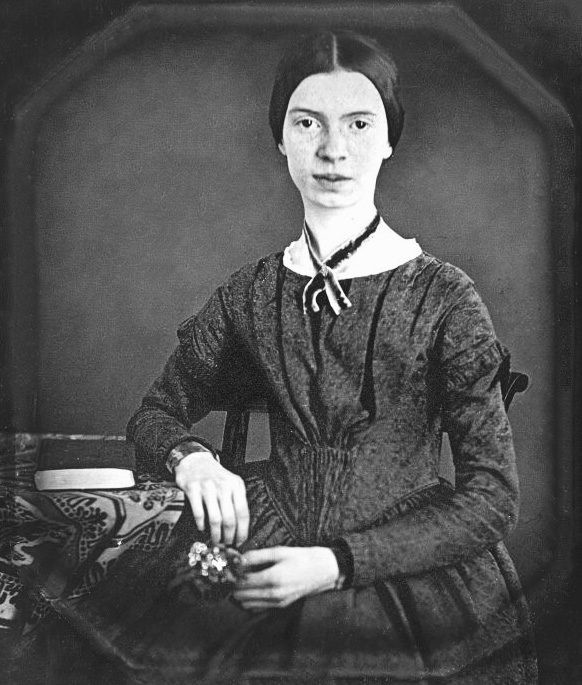
Emily Dickinson, poet considered to be one of the most important figures in American literature

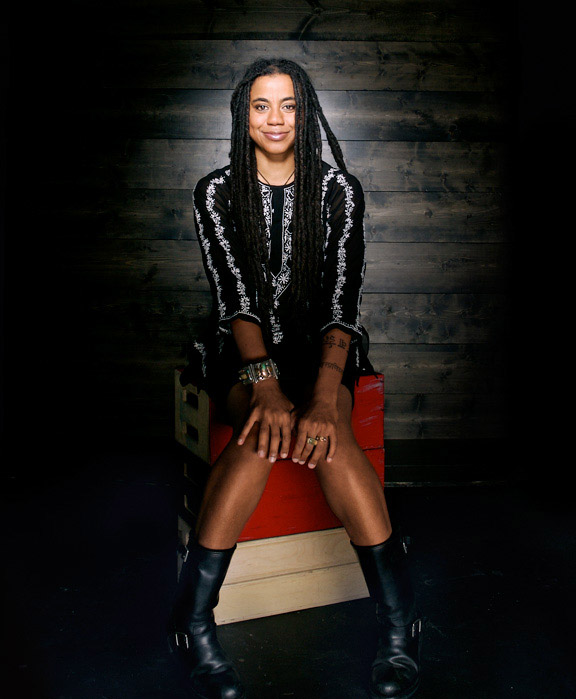
Suzan-Lori Parks, Pulitzer Prize-winning playwright and screenwriter

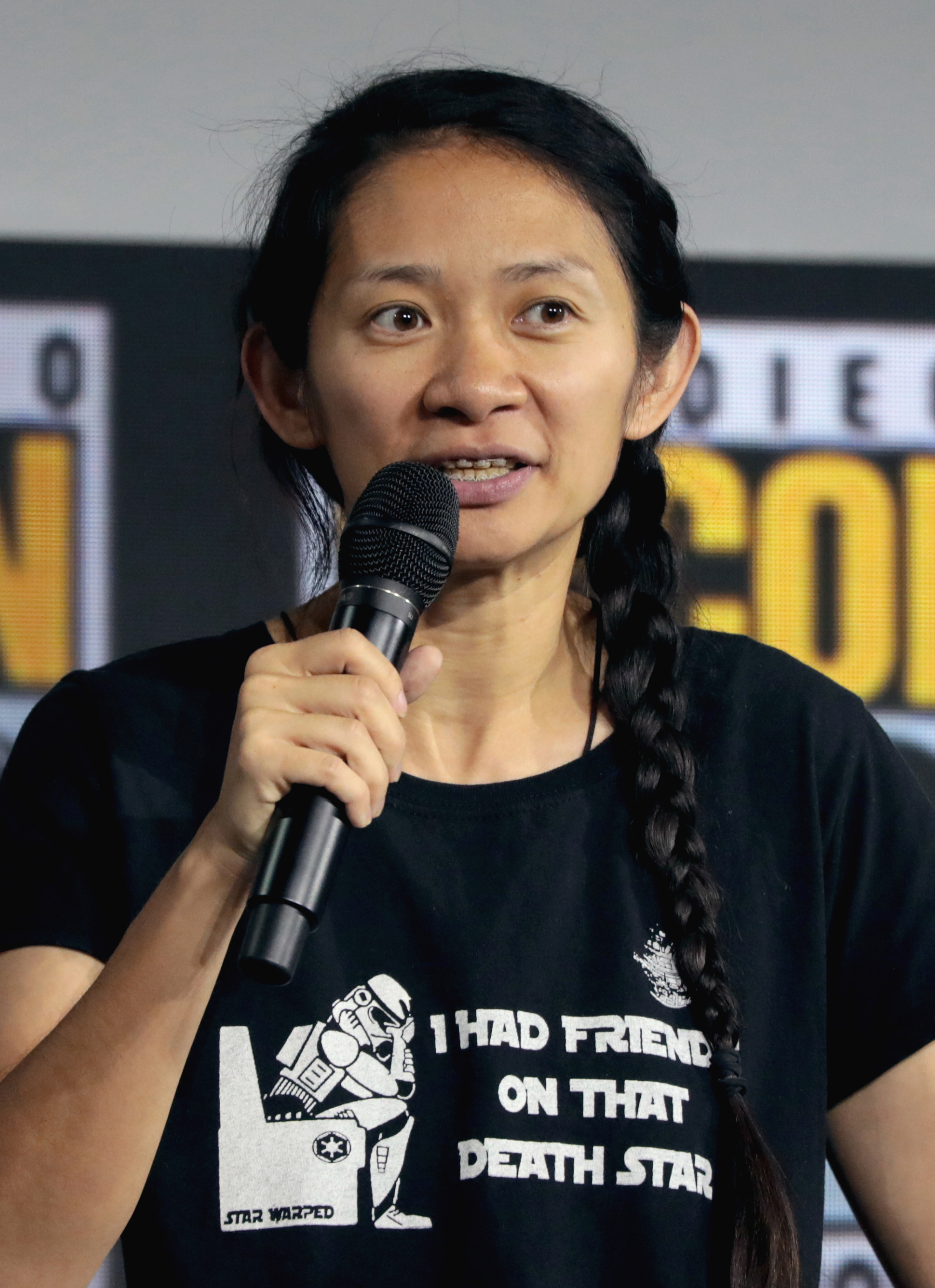
Chloé Zhao, Academy Award-winning director/filmmaker

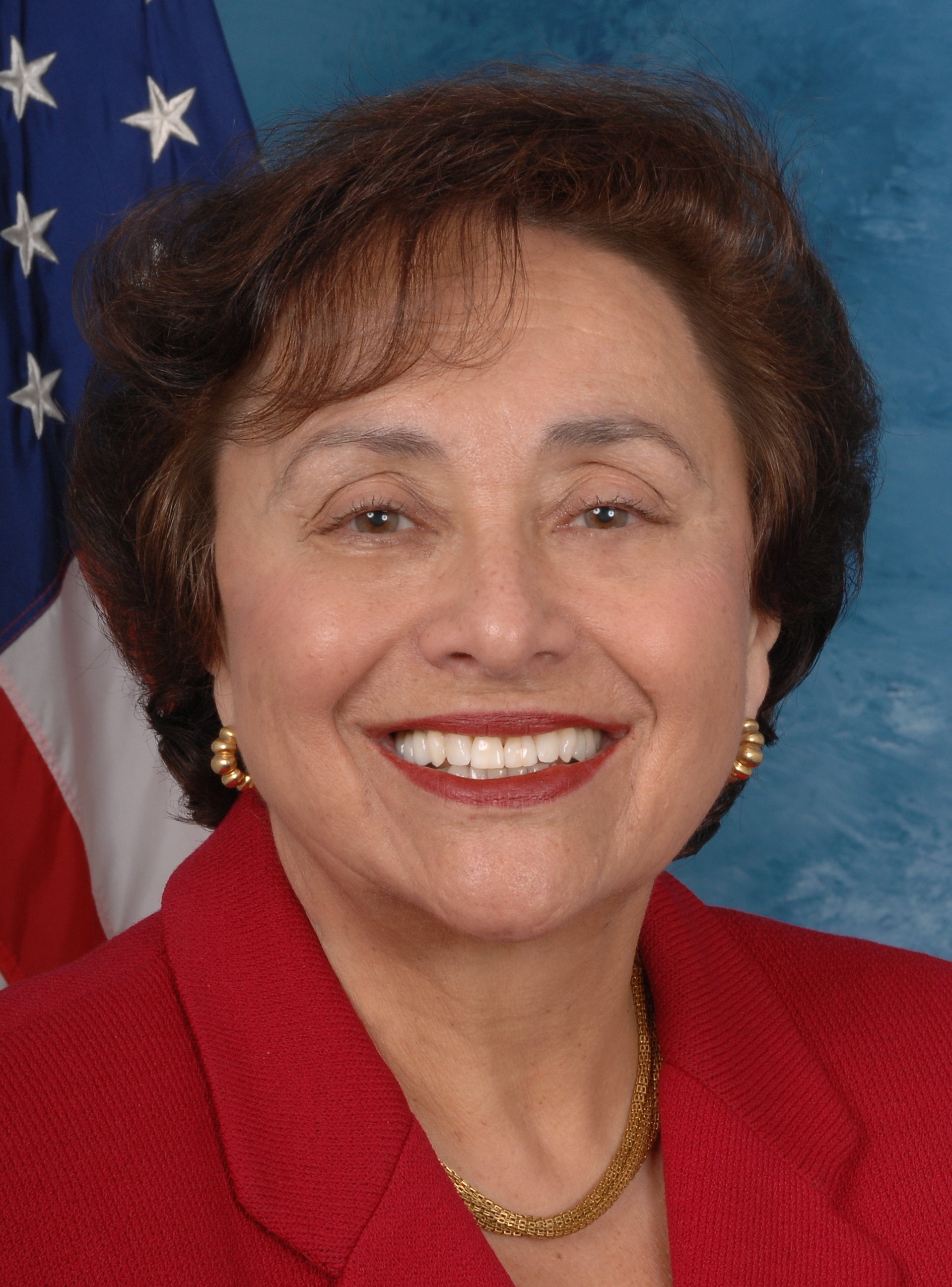
Nita Lowey, U.S. Congresswoman for New York's 17th congressional district, first woman to chair the House Appropriations Committee

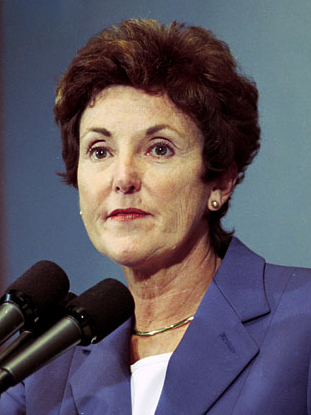
Jane Garvey, first female administrator of the U.S. Federal Aviation Administration

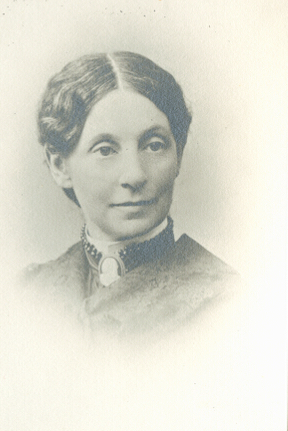
Helen Pitts Douglass, abolitionist and suffragist, wife of Frederick Douglass

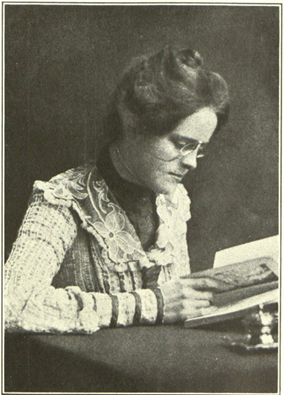
Caroline Ransom Williams, the first female Egyptologist in North America

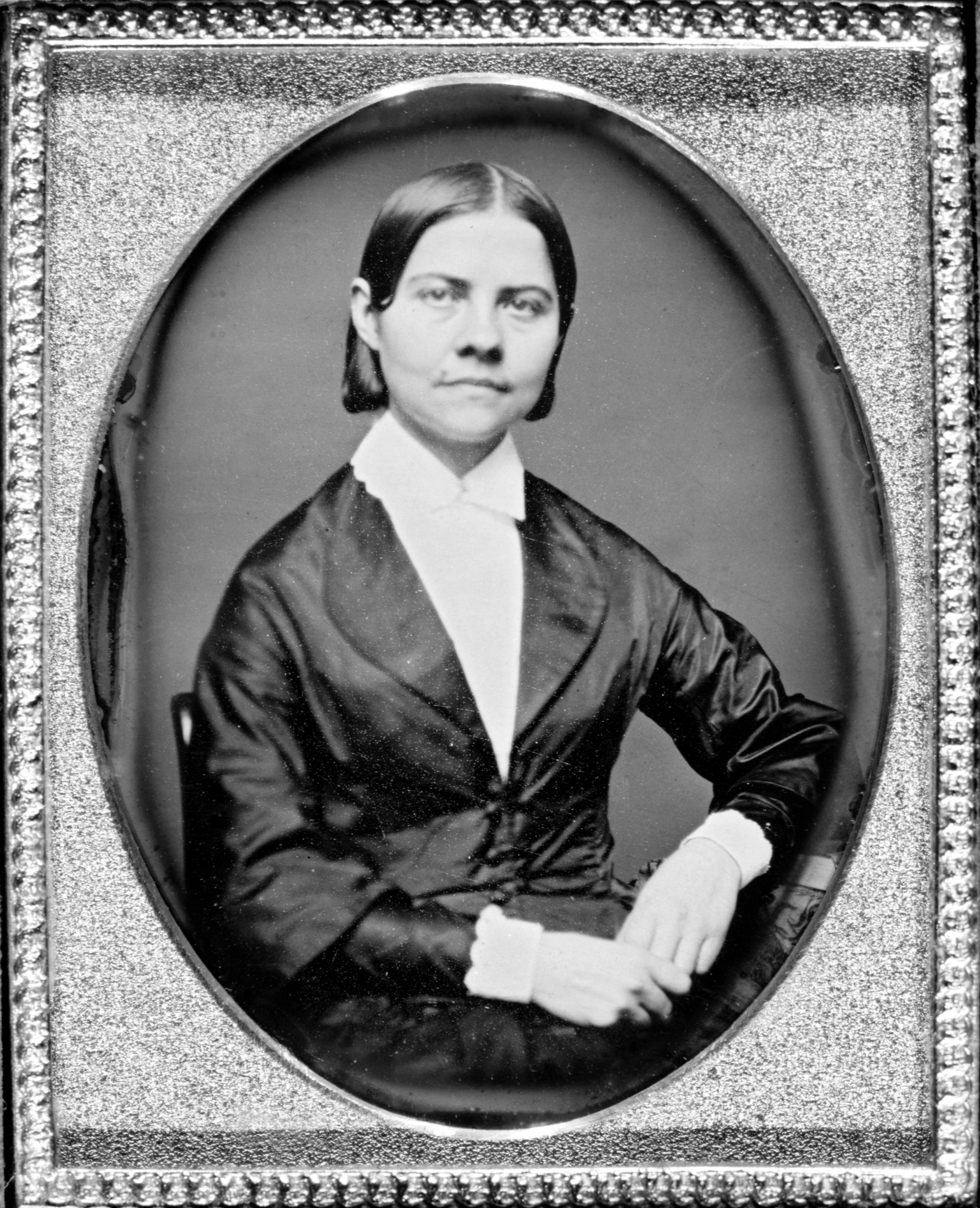
Lucy Stone, prominent abolitionist and suffragist, founder of the Women's Journal, the first woman from Massachusetts to earn a college degree

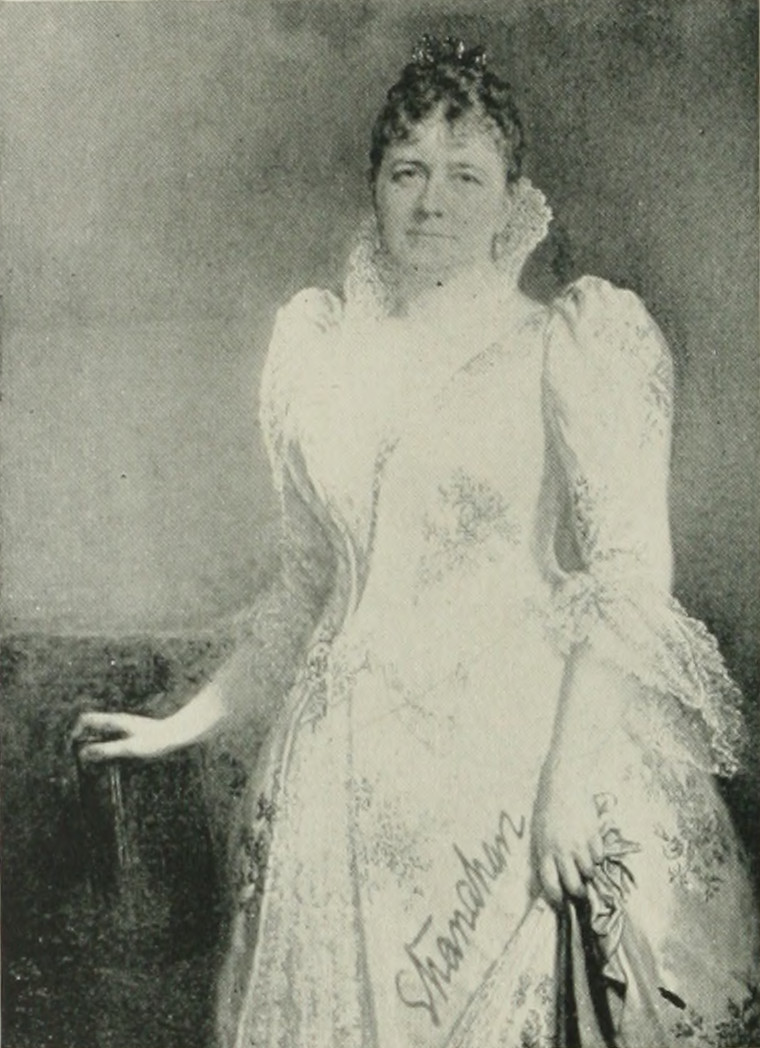
Clara Harrison Stranahan, founder of Barnard College

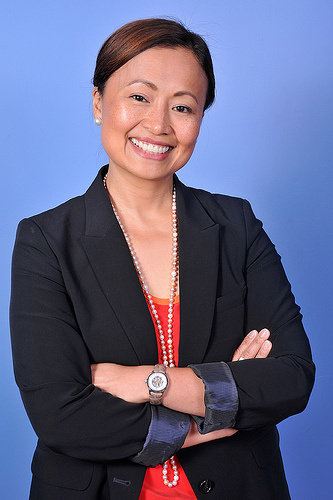
Sheila Lirio Marcelo, founder, chairwoman and CEO of Care.com

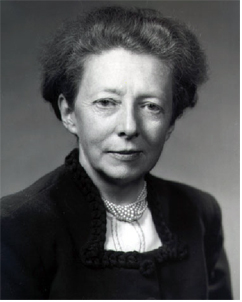
Constance McLaughlin Green, Pulitzer Prize-winning historian

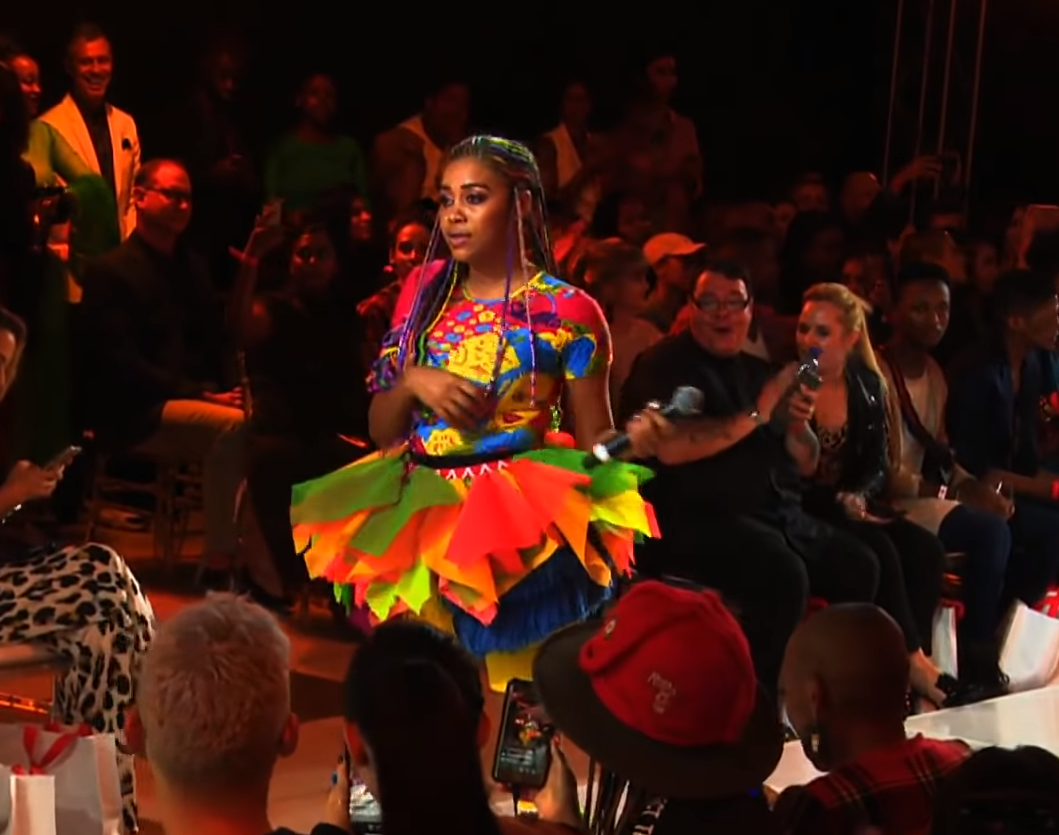
Sho Madjozi, South African rap artist

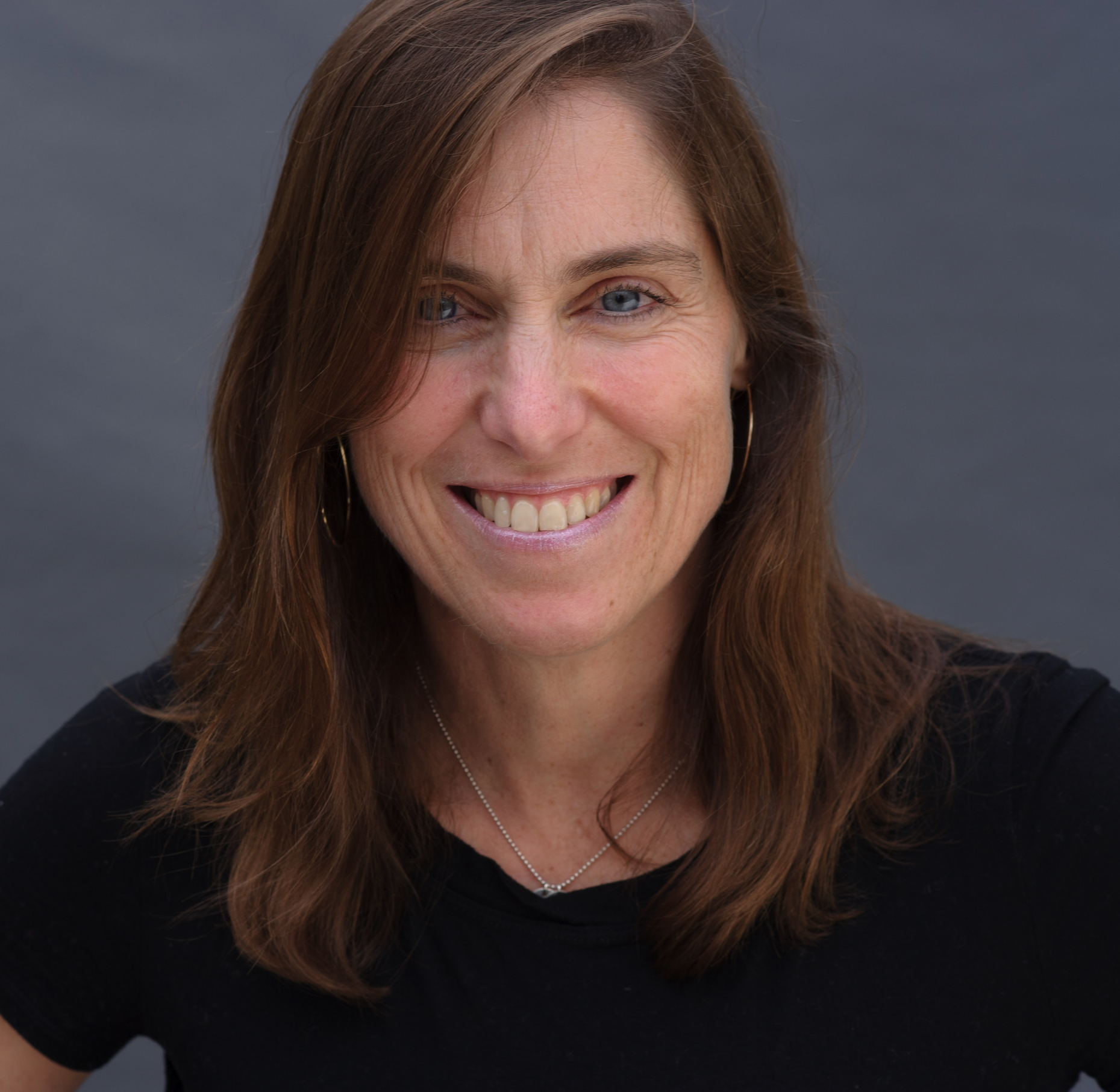
Mary Mazzio, documentary filmmaker and former Olympic athlete

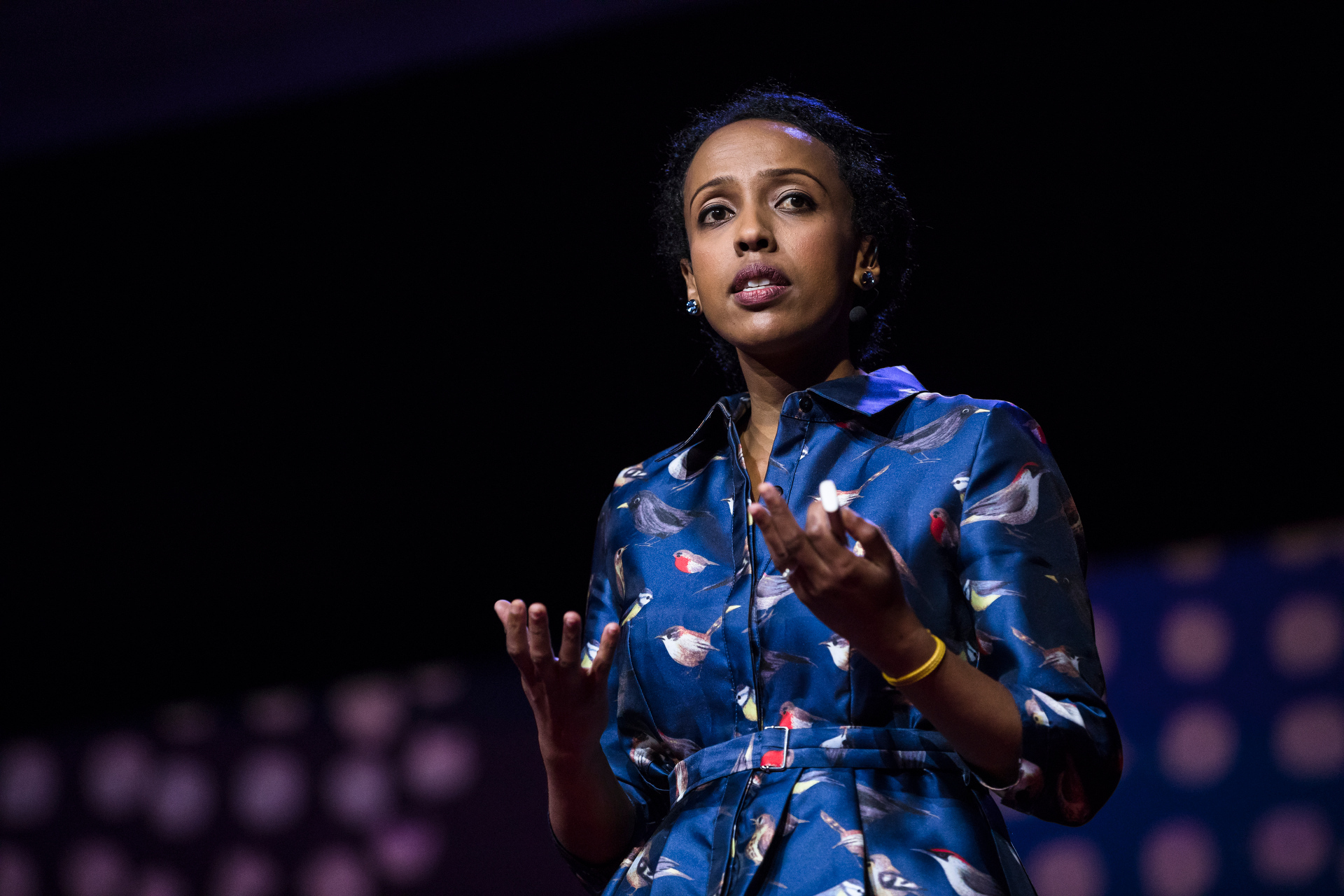
Sara Menker, 2017, Ethiopian businesswoman and food sustainability advocate

== In popular culture ==
=== Literature ===
- Wendy Wasserstein's 1977 play, Uncommon Women and Others, is based upon Wasserstein's experiences at Mount Holyoke of the early 1970s. The play explores the lives of the fictional characters Carter, Holly, Kate, Leilah, Rita, Muffet, Samantha, and Susie as they gather for lunch five years after graduation and reminisce about their collegiate days. The play was adapted into a television movie starring a then-unknown Meryl Streep.
- In David Foster Wallace's 1987 novel "The Broom of the System" Clarice Beadsman, the sister of the novel's protagonist Lenore, is a graduate of Mount Holyoke College. Another character, Melinda Susan Metalman Lang, was her roommate. Some scenes depict time spent at the college.

=== Film ===
Several feature films reference Mount Holyoke. Prominent among them are:

- Dirty Dancing (1987), which is set at a summer resort in the Catskills in the summer of 1963. The protagonist, Frances "Baby" Houseman (named after Mount Holyoke graduate Frances Perkins), plans to attend Mount Holyoke in the fall to study the economics of underdeveloped countries and then later to enter the Peace Corps. The film is screened annually for first-year students.
- National Lampoon's Animal House (1978), which is set in 1962. It satirizes a common practice up until the mid-1970s when women attending Seven Sister colleges were connected with, or to, students at Ivy League schools. In the film, fraternity brothers from Delta house of the fictional Faber College (based on Dartmouth College) take a road trip to the fictional Emily Dickinson College (Mount Holyoke College).

=== Television ===
An urban legend says that the characters of the hit 1960s cartoon Scooby Doo Where Are You! are said to be modeled after the Five College Consortium. Scooby Doo is meant to be University of Massachusetts Amherst, Shaggy is Hampshire, Fred is Amherst, Daphne is Mount Holyoke and Velma is Smith. These characterizations are made under the assumptions of stereotypes of the students from the Five Colleges. However, Hampshire College admitted its first students in 1970, one year after the show premiered.

=== Humor ===
- A 1968 article in the Columbia University student newspaper Columbia Daily Spectator repeated a line from the 1964 movie Sex and the College Girl: "Smith to bed, Mount Holyoke to wed". This referred to the reputation of students from the two Seven Sisters Colleges. In the 1980s, Mount Holyoke students launched a campaign against a dating book and article written by two Princeton graduates that tell men how to pick up female students at women's colleges. Under the "Pickup Strategy" category, the article states: '"Low Key. Recall the Smith saying, 'Holyoke to bed; Smith to wed.''
- The Mount Holyoke song, "We're Saving Ourselves For Yale", alludes to the Ivy League-Seven Sisters relationship, which amusingly relates tales of women who hold onto their virginity long enough to catch a Yale graduate to marry. The song features prominently in Wendy Wasserstein's "Uncommon Women and Others".
