= Trans History: From Ancient Times to the Present Day =

2025 graphic novel by Alex L. Combs and Andrew Eakett

- Page count: 384 pages
- Publisher: Candlewick Press

Creative team
- Creators: Alex L. Combs and Andrew Eakett

Original publication
- Dates of publication: May 13, 2025
- Language: English
- ISBN: 9781536219234

Trans History: From Ancient Times to the Present Day is a biographical graphic novel anthology by Alex L. Combs and Andrew Eakett, showcasing various important figures in transgender history. It was published on May 13, 2025 by Candlewick Press.

== Summary ==
The book follows the history of suspected and confirmed transgender people across thousands of years history in different cultures including Elagabalus, Antonio de Erauso, and Marsha P. Johnson and Sylvia Rivera.

The final chapter is a tribute to trans activist and University of Connecticut alumni Rose Wong, who came to media attention after being rejected by Smith College in 2013. (Note: See Transgender admissions policies at women's colleges for more information) Wong was interviewed for the book but died from suicide before its completion.

== Reception ==
The book received a starred review from School Library Journal. Kirkus Reviews dubbed it a "solid and useful introduction to a vast topic", but criticized instances of overly technical language. It also reviewed by Booklist and Broad Street Review.

An audiobook edition voiced by the authors alongside a full cast won the 2026 Odyssey Award. A review of the audiobook by the Hub, a blog of the Young Adult Library Services Association, noted that the book brought in activists from the modern day sections to voice themselves.

=== Accolades ===
Year	Award/Honor	Result	Ref.
2026	Odyssey Award for Excellence in Audiobook Production for Young Adults	Won	
2026	Great Graphic Novels for Teens	Included	
2026	GLAAD Media Award for Outstanding Graphic Novel/Anthology	Shortlisted	
2026	American Library Association Rainbow Book List - Top Ten Young Adult Books	Top Ten	
2026	Amazing Audiobooks for Young Adults	Top Ten	
2025	American Library Association's 2025 Best Graphic Novels for Adults Reading List	Top Ten	
2025	School Library Journal - Best Graphic Novels of the Year	Included	
