= Mount Holyoke College Botanic Garden =

Gardens in Massachusetts, United States

Coordinates: 42.2574°N 72.5724°W

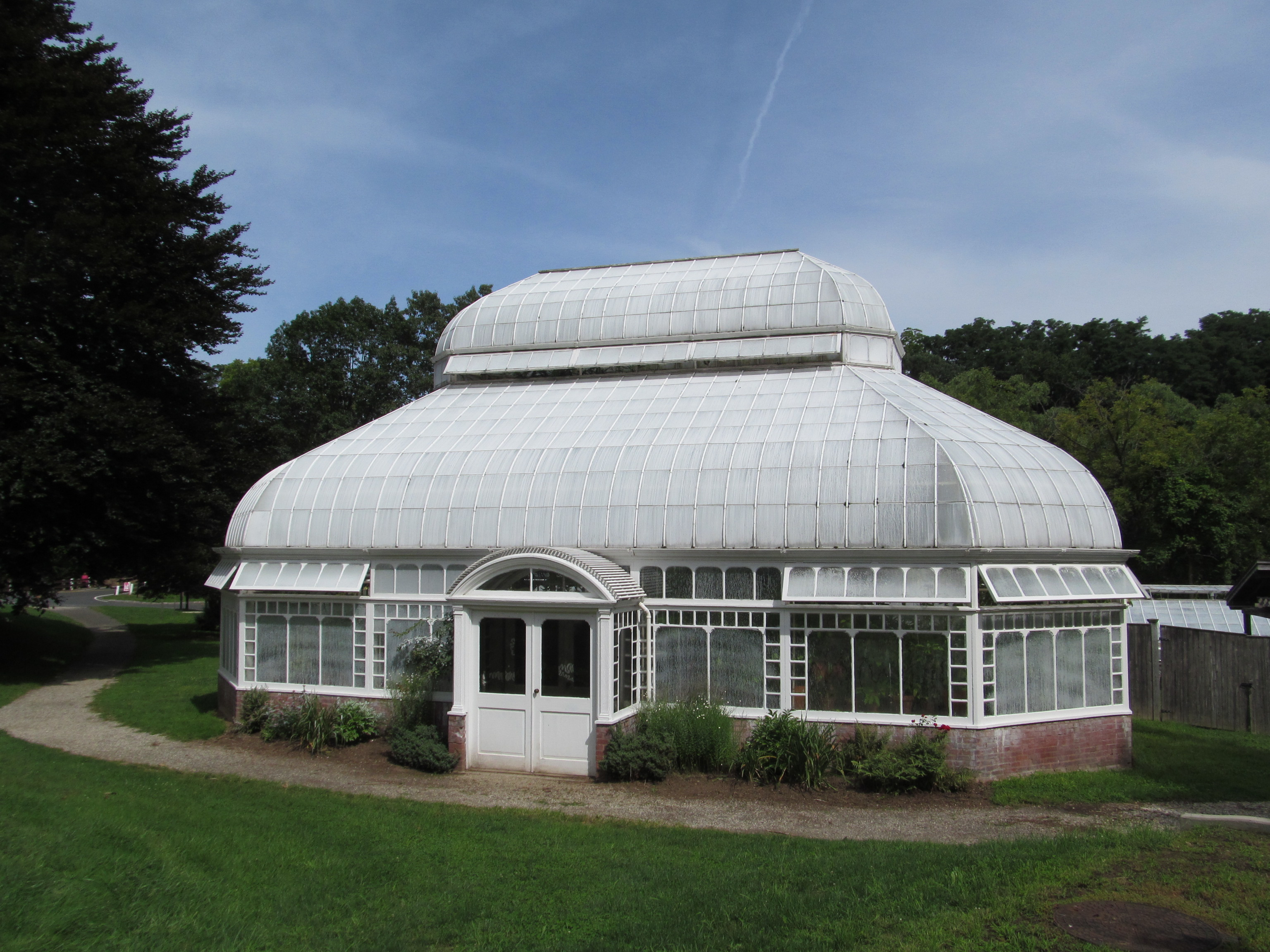
- Talcott Greenhouse
- Interactive map of Mount Holyoke College Botanic Garden
- Website: Official website

The Mount Holyoke College Botanic Garden, in South Hadley, Massachusetts, United States, encompasses the Mount Holyoke College campus, an arboretum, numerous gardens, and the Talcott Greenhouse. It was first designated a botanical garden in 1878, with guidance from Lydia Shattuck, professor of botany. The construction of the Talcott Greenhouse complex, which houses the Botanic Garden's collection of non-hardy plants, began in 1896, after the original greenhouse was destroyed by fire, and was completed in 1899.

The Botanic Garden serves as an outdoor teaching laboratory as well as a place to arrange and display plants on campus. The Talcott Greenhouse maintains a permanent collection in addition to space for research and teaching purposes.

== Principal gardens ==
- Class of 1904 Garden - herbaceous perennials
- Drue Matthews Garden - alpine and rock garden plants
- Virginia "Timmy" Craig '31 Rhododendron Garden - rhododendrons and other woodland plants native to Eastern North America and Eastern Asia
- Bullard Garden (Chapel Garden) - trees, shrubs and herbaceous perennials
- Ciruti Center Courtyard - Shade-loving plants such as Ilex (hollies), Hosta, Helleborus and Hydrangea
- Willits-Hallowell Center Courtyard
- Heckel Staircase Garden - perennials and dwarf evergreens

== Traditions ==
The Greenhouse sustains a college tradition by providing students with plants during their first year, which many try to keep alive until they graduate.

Since 1971, Mount Holyoke has hosted an annual Flower Show each spring.

== Gallery ==
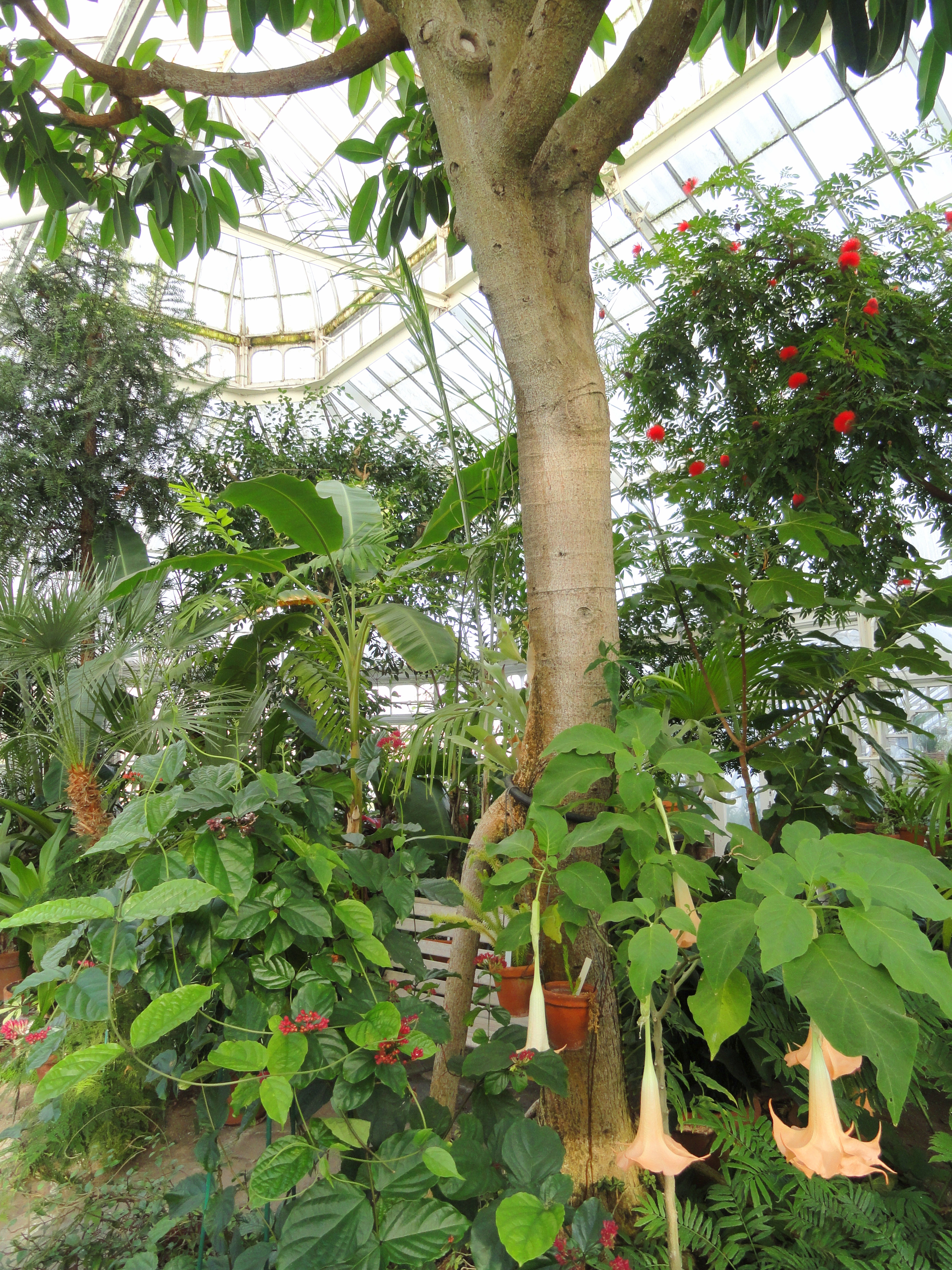
Interior of the greenhouse.

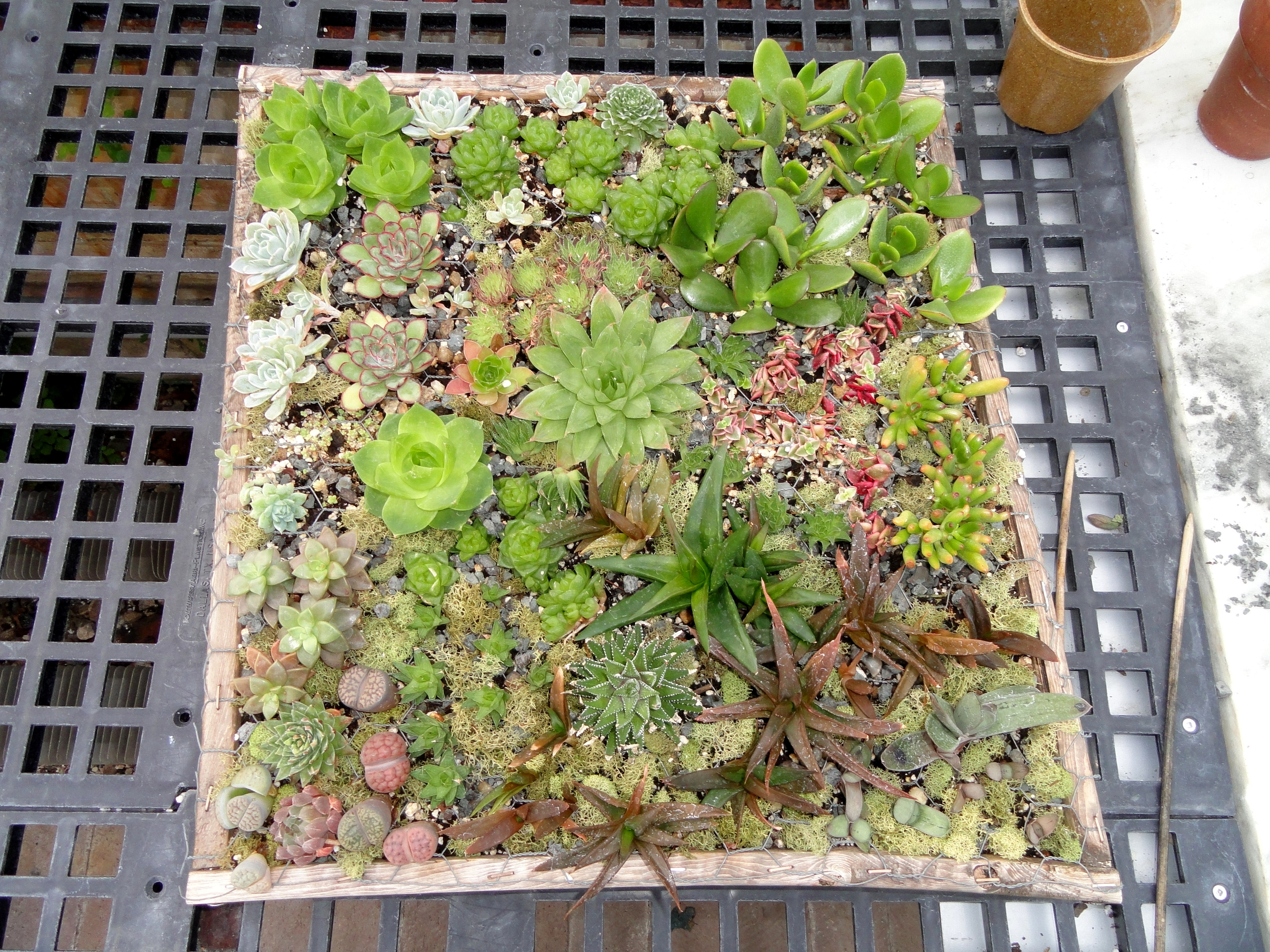
Succulent display.

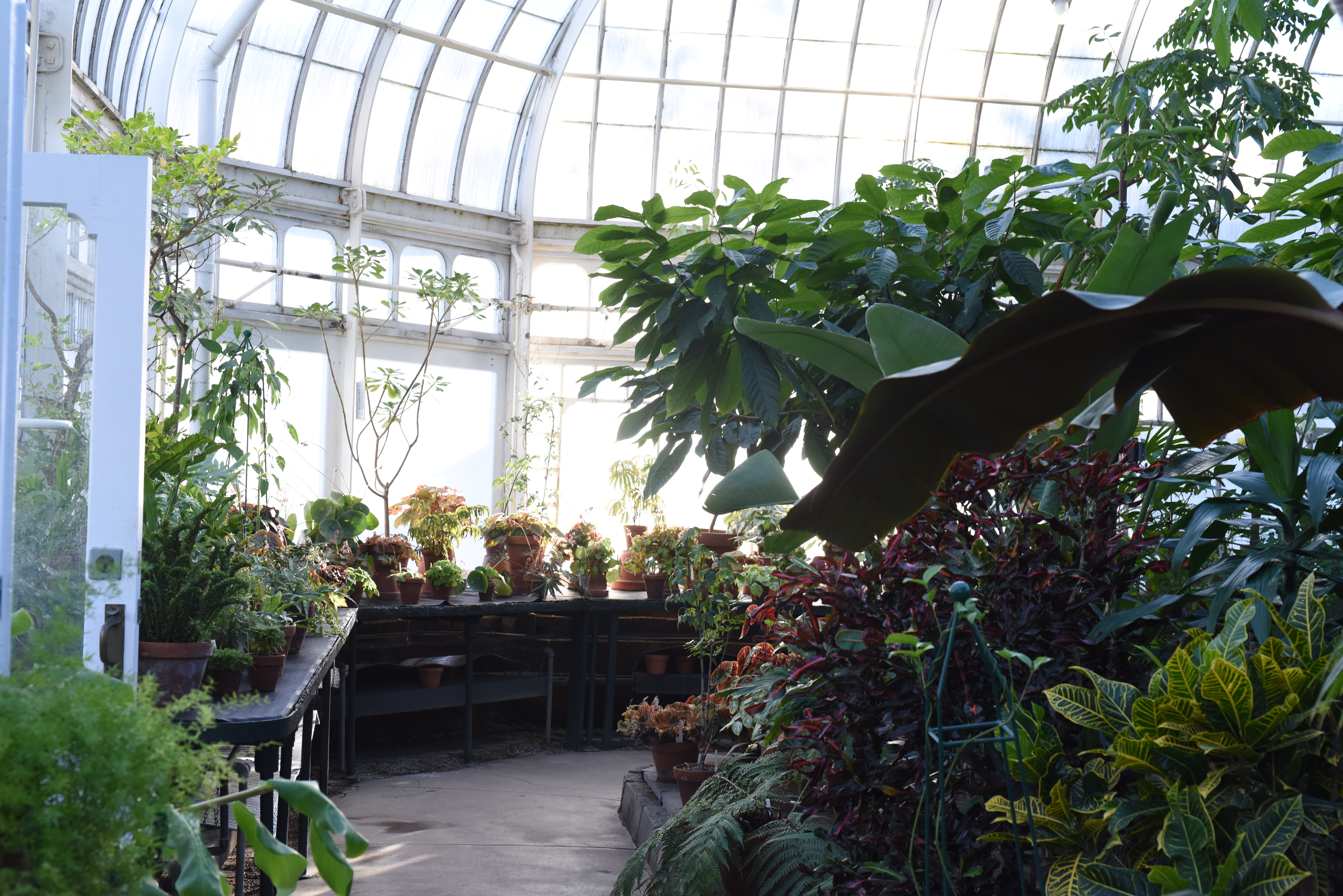
Talcott Greenhouse at Mount Holyoke

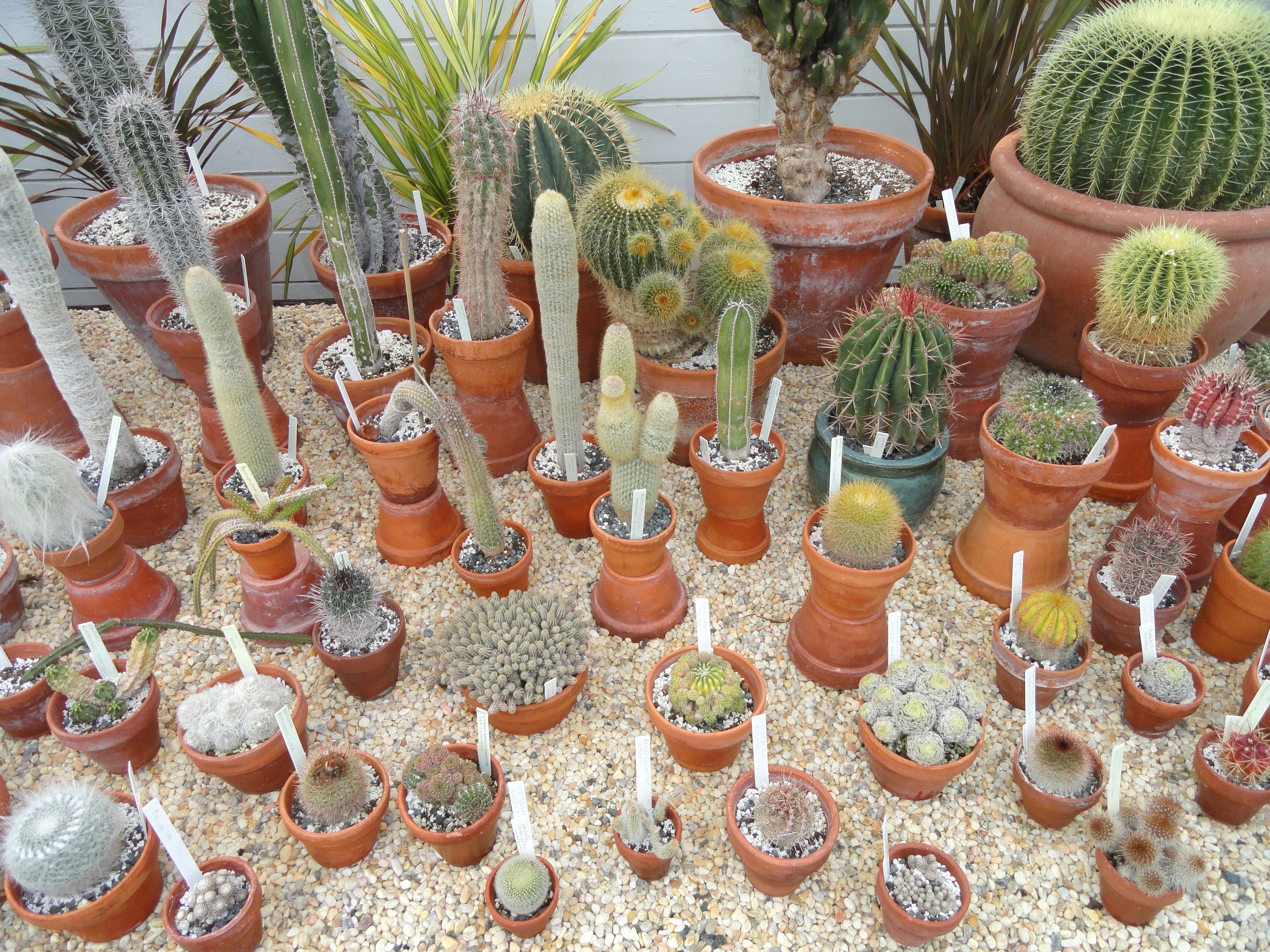
Various cacti.

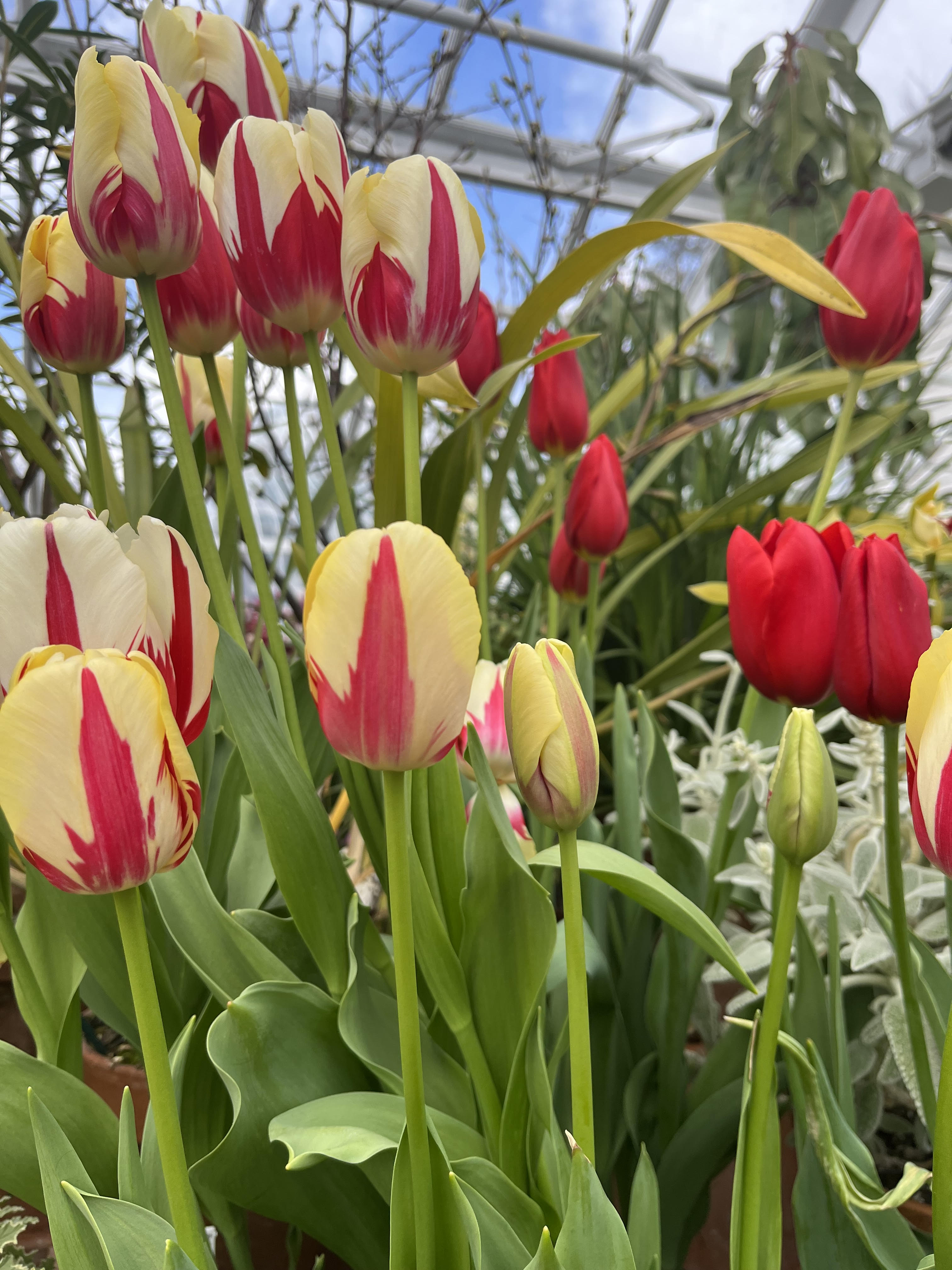
Tulips displayed during a flower show.

== See also ==
- List of botanical gardens in the United States
