= Transgender admissions policies at women's colleges =

Policies defining transgender student's admission in United States colleges

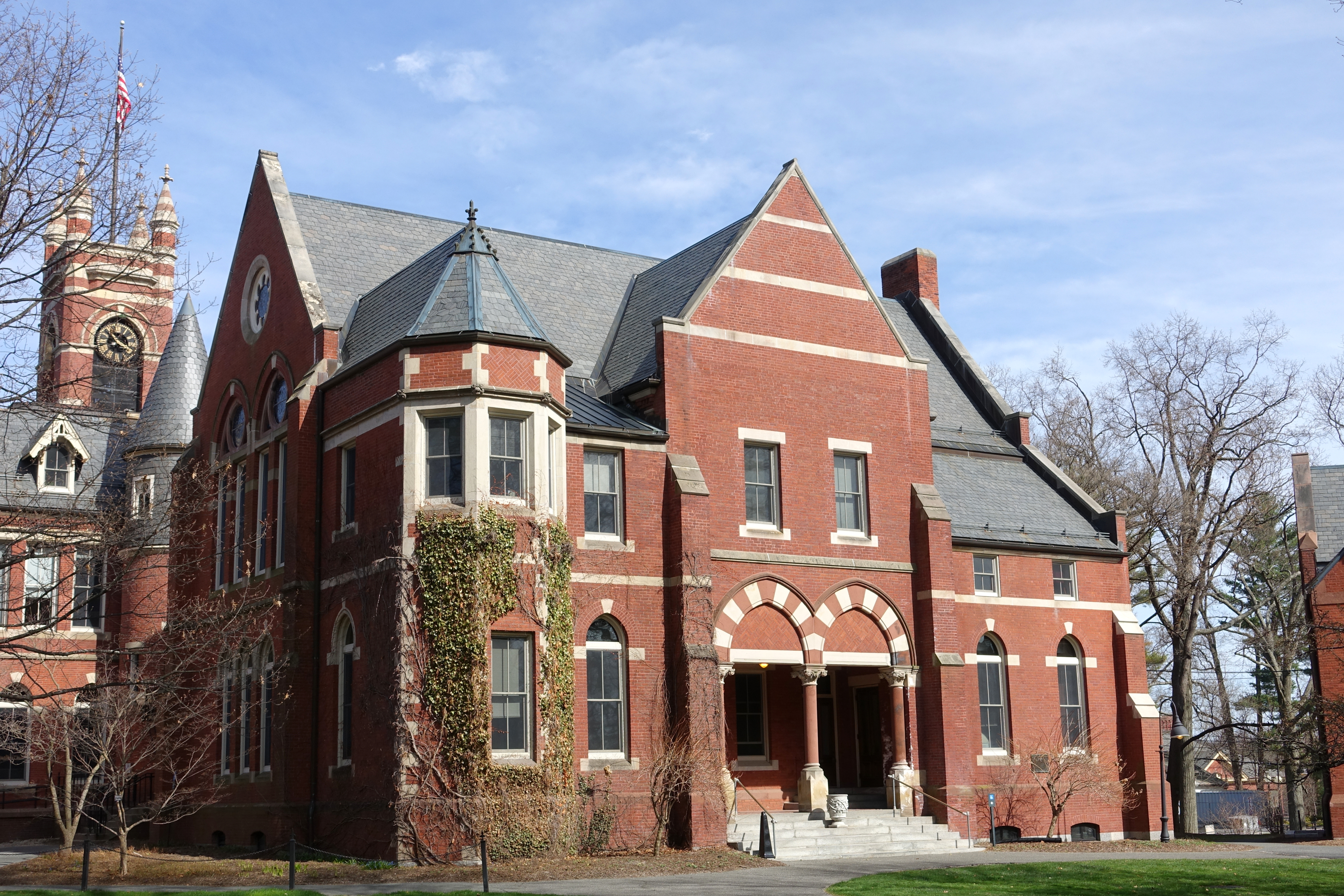
Smith College, the women's college that initially denied admission to Rose Wong, revised their transgender admissions policy in 2015.

The admission of transgender students to women's colleges in the United States has been a subject of debate. Some colleges have changed their policy in favor of admitting transgender students, but there is little uniformity in definitional details.

== Policy changes ==
=== Smith College ===
In 2013, high school senior Rose (then Calliope) Wong was denied acceptance to Smith College, one of the largest women's colleges in the United States, because she identified as a transgender woman. Wong marked her biological gender identity as male on her FAFSA, despite her self-identification as a woman. Subsequently, Smith deemed Wong inadmissible to the women's college and denied her application. Smith students, led by a trans-activist organization, Q&A, protested the decision and began a Change.org petition encouraging Smith to revise their admissions policy to include trans women. Although Smith was not the first women's college to amend their admissions policy, Wong's story catalyzed a nationwide reconsideration of admissions policies at women's institutions. Smith College amended their policy to include admission of trans women in May 2015.

=== Others ===
Mills College, located in Oakland, California, formally published an inclusive policy accepting transgender women and nonbinary students, in 2014.

A 2019 analysis only found two Women's College Coalition (WCC) member institutions without such policies: Meredith College and St. Catherine University. Since then, St. Catherine has revised its policy to admit transgender women and nonbinary students.

== Different policies at women's colleges across the country ==
The policies at each institution vary. Some, such as Hollins University, Cedar Crest College, and Historically Black Women's Colleges Spelman College and Bennett College, only admit students who live and identify as women, regardless of their gender assignment at birth, but allow admitted students who come out as another gender to continue their studies and graduate.

By contrast, Mills College, one of the first women's institution to adopt "a formal admissions policy regarding transgender and transitioning," does accept trans men who have not changed their legal gender markers. Agnes Scott College published a policy as early as 2011 and updated in 2014 with language that states that they openly admit "students who were assigned female at birth, as well as those who were assigned male or female at birth, but who now identify as female, transgender, agender, gender fluid or non-binary."

In August 2024, Sweet Briar College sent a communication to members of the college's community clarifying the Board of Directors’ May 2024 decision to exclude applicants who were not assigned female at birth and do not identify as a woman at the time of applying. The communication references the college's 1901 charter, arguing that “the Board must honor the dictates of the Will, which imposes the requirement that the College be a place of “girls and young women” – a phrase that must be interpreted as it was understood at the time the Will was written.” This change was protested by students, alumnae, and staff, including a Faculty Resolution on Admission to the College, passed on August 26, 2024.

Ultimately, the differences between the policies are determined by the individual institution's definition of womanhood and their varying degrees of inclusivity and/or exclusivity extended to the transgender community.

== Challenges against evolving transgender admissions policies ==
Although the exact number of trans women attending women's colleges nationwide is unknown, responses to the revised admissions policies have garnered mixed reactions over the past four years. Mills College, the first women's college to welcome trans students, reports approximately 8% of over 700 undergraduate students identify as transgender. Despite the low visibility of trans women at women's colleges, these institutions continue to face backlash and criticism, specifically from alumnae, who often believe the policies disregard and veer away from the core mission and purpose of women's colleges. Although majority of alumnae, current students and the institutions themselves agree women's colleges were created to educate and empower women, the discrepancies in defining and labeling womanhood fuel the differences in opinions and the revised policies themselves.

Furthermore, with the introduction and adoption of trans-inclusive admissions policies on these campuses, additional challenges include the day-to-day implementation of the policy, such as adequately providing academic and residential resources for trans students while ensuring a welcoming and inclusive collegiate environment. Trans students even face the possibility of potential physical harassment and other forms of discrimination on traditional college campuses.
