= Schwassmann–Wachmann =

There are several comets named Schwassmann–Wachmann, the discovery of which is co-credited to German astronomers Arnold Schwassmann and Arno Arthur Wachmann:

- 29P/Schwassmann–Wachmann (29P/1927 V1, Schwassmann–Wachmann 1)
- 31P/Schwassmann–Wachmann (31P/1929 B1, Schwassmann–Wachmann 2)
- 73P/Schwassmann–Wachmann (73P/1930 J1, Schwassmann–Wachmann 3)
