= 1704 Wachmann =

Main-belt asteroid

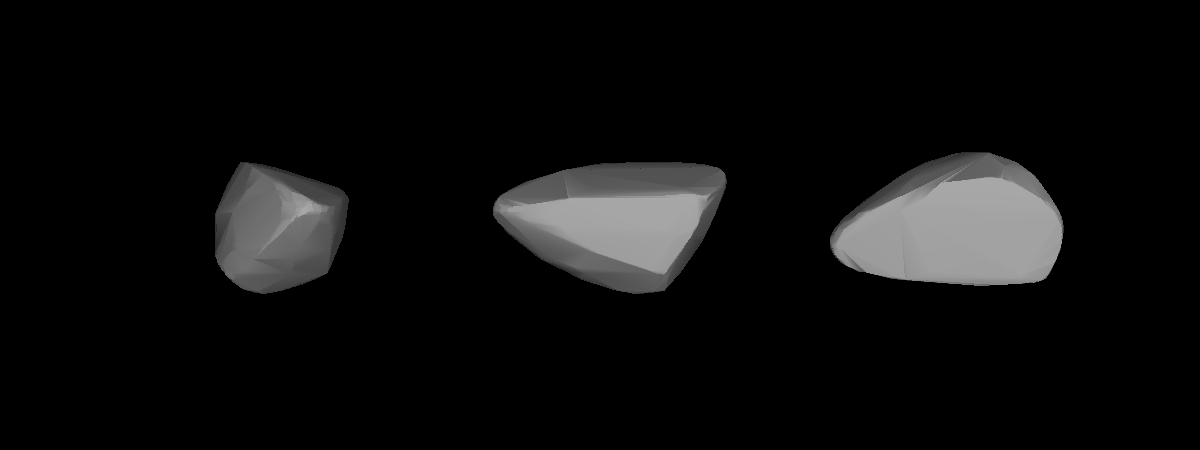
- Light curve based 3D-model of Wachmann

Discovery
- Discovered by: K. Reinmuth
- Discovery site: Heidelberg Obs.
- Discovery date: 7 March 1924

Designations
- Named after: Arno Wachmann (German astronomer)
- Alternative designations: A924 EE · 1947 CE; 1957 BJ
- Minor planet category: main-belt · (inner)

Orbital characteristics
- Epoch 4 September 2017 (JD 2458000.5)
- Uncertainty parameter 0
- Observation arc: 93.16 yr (34,026 days)
- Aphelion: 2.4163 AU
- Perihelion: 2.0292 AU
- Semi-major axis: 2.2228 AU
- Eccentricity: 0.0871
- Orbital period (sidereal): 3.31 yr (1,210 days)
- Mean anomaly: 67.047°
- Mean motion: 0° 17^{m} 50.64^{s} / day
- Inclination: 0.9715°
- Longitude of ascending node: 259.47°
- Argument of perihelion: 280.77°

Physical characteristics
- Dimensions: 6.618±0.070; 6.934±0.070 km 7.82 km (calculated)
- Synodic rotation period: 3.314±0.001 h
- Geometric albedo: 0.1767±0.0133; 0.193±0.036; 0.20 (assumed)
- Spectral type: S
- Absolute magnitude (H): 12.9 · 12.97±0.13 · 13.3

1704 Wachmann, provisional designation A924 EE, is a stony asteroid from the inner regions of the asteroid belt, approximately 7 kilometers in diameter. It was discovered by German astronomer Karl Reinmuth at Heidelberg Observatory on 7 March 1924. It was later named after astronomer Arno Wachmann.

== Classification and orbit ==
The S-type asteroid orbits the Sun in the inner main-belt at a distance of 2.0–2.4 AU once every 3 years and 4 months (1,210 days). Its orbit has an eccentricity of 0.09 and an inclination of 1° with respect to the ecliptic. No precoveries were taken. The asteroid's observation arc begins 3 days after its official discovery observation.

== Physical characteristics ==
=== Lightcurves ===
In April 2007, a rotational lightcurve Wachmann was obtained at the U.S. Sandia View Observatory in New Mexico (H03). Lightcurve analysis gave a well-defined rotation period of 3.314±0.001 hours with a brightness variation of 0.40 magnitude (U=3).

=== Diameter and albedo ===
According to the survey carried out by the NEOWISE mission of NASA's Wide-field Infrared Survey Explorer, Wachmann measures 6.6 and 6.9 kilometers in diameter, and its surface has an albedo of 0.177 and 0.193, respectively, while the Collaborative Asteroid Lightcurve Link assumes a standard albedo for stony asteroids of 0.20 and calculates a diameter of 7.8 kilometers, based on an absolute magnitude of 12.9.

== Naming ==
This minor planet was named for Arno Wachmann (1902–1990), long-time astronomer at the Bergedorf Observatory in Hamburg, discoverer of minor planets and comets, and observer of variable and binary stars. He is best known for the co-discovery of the three "Schwassmann–Wachmann" comets, 29P, 31P and 73P. The official naming citation was published by the Minor Planet Center on 20 February 1976 (M.P.C. 3933).
