= Elisabeth Bardwell =

American astronomer

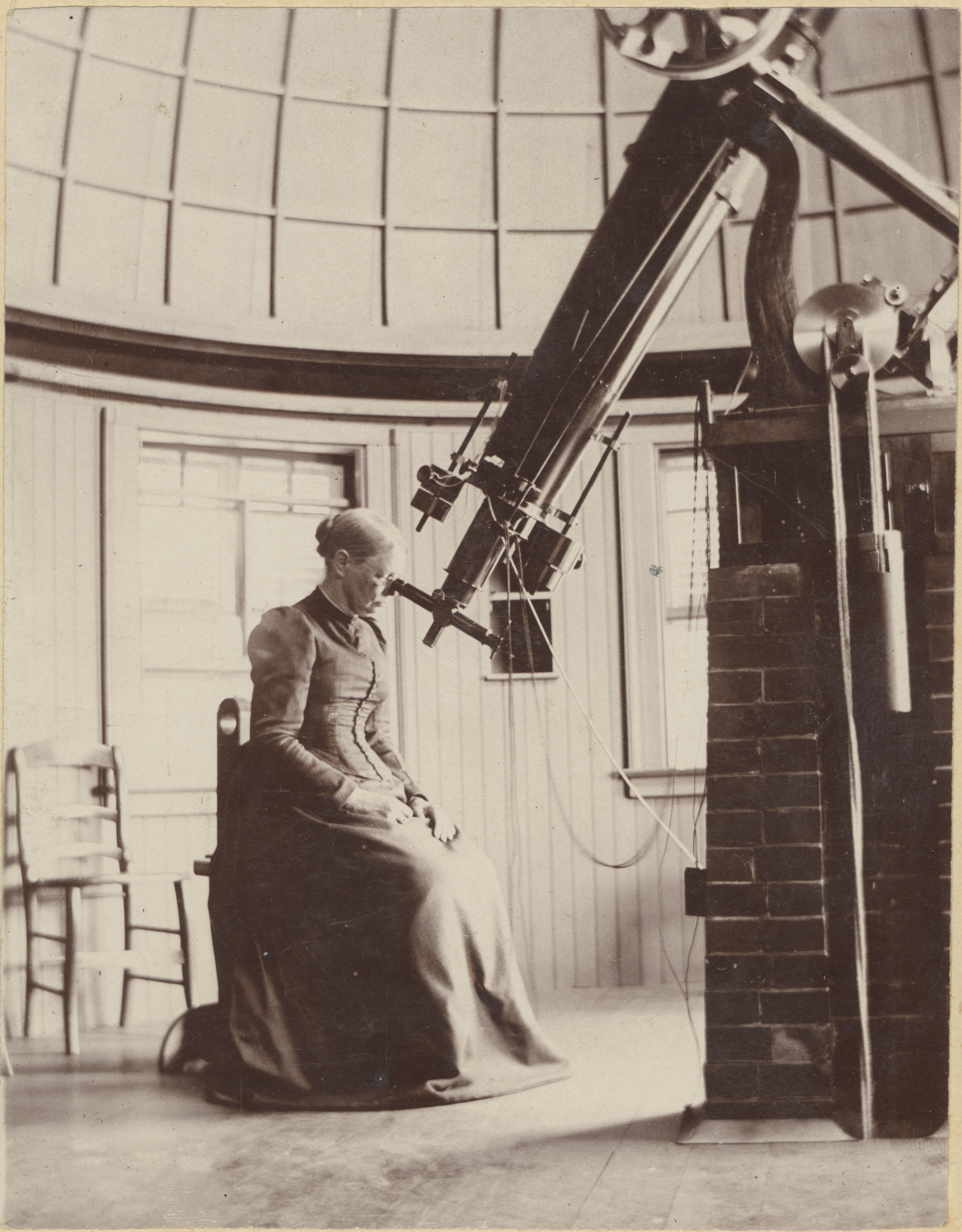
- Elisabeth Bardwell looking through a telescope at the Williston Observatory, 1881
- Born: December 4, 1831; Colrain
- Died: May 27, 1899 (aged 67)
- Alma mater: Mount Holyoke College
- Occupation: Astronomer
- Employer: Mount Holyoke College

Elisabeth Miller Bardwell (December 4, 1831 – May 27, 1899) was an American astronomer whose main area of study was meteor showers. She graduated from Mount Holyoke College in 1866, and continued on at the college as an instructor until her death. During those 33 years, she taught a mixture of algebra, trigonometry, physics, and astronomy for the first twenty years, and eventually only astronomy after 1886. She also oversaw the development of the observatory at the college which included invited visits to the Washington, Princeton, Lick, Berlin, and Potsdam observatories. In November, 1891 she was elected a member of the Astronomical Society of the Pacific; in March 1895, of the British Astronomical Association, and in 1898, of the American Association for the Advancement of Science. She was a contributor to Astronomy, Astro-Physics, and Popular Astronomy.

== Early life ==
Elisabeth Miller Bardwell was born in Colrain, Franklin County, Massachusetts, to Amos and Minerva (Miller) Bardwell. As a child, Elisabeth spent lots of time outside and developed an extroverted personality that led to a fearless and risk-taking demeanor. Often she could be found taking books with her when she played outside, as she was known to learn from the environment around her. Bardwell also showed early signs of being a scholar, finishing Adams' New Arithmetic at age twelve. Initially, she attended the Academy at Shelburne Falls, learning Latin and various other subjects in order to prepare her for teaching at a higher level in the future. She began teaching at age 18 at district schools in her hometown until she decided to leave teaching to pursue further studies.

== Time at Mount Holyoke College ==
Bardwell graduated from Mount Holyoke College in 1866 and remained to teach there for 33 years. She taught algebra, trigonometry, physics, and astronomy. She was also the director of the John Payson Williston Observatory at the college from its opening in 1881 until 1896, during which time she oversaw its growth. Improvements in telescopes allowed her and her students to observe sunspots, lunar occultations, and variable stars. The astronomy program became a popular course of study with nearly 20% of students choosing to enroll in an astronomy class between 1896-1976 after the college introduced an astronomy major in 1895. The development of the observatory and the course itself laid the groundwork for the next generation of female astronomy professors at the college, such as Anne Sewell Young.

== Publications and contributions to the field of astronomy ==
When Bardwell was not teaching, she was watching the sky for celestial events. In a volume of the Sidereal Messenger, she published her observations of a meteor shower radiating from the constellation Andromeda. She also published detailed observations of the Leonid meteor shower, including a chart of the Leonid Radiant in Popular Astronomy. While these observations were not new discoveries, they helped confirm which radiants meteors originated from. In 1880, Bardwell oversaw the building of the John Payson Williston Observatory where she would be the director until her death.

== Death and legacy ==
Towards the end of her life, Bardwell resided in Greenfield, Massachusetts with her sister. Her sister died in 1895, leading to a long period of grief for Bardwell who felt very close with her sister. Seven years prior to her death, Bardwell was diagnosed with a severe illness from which she never fully recovered. On May 27,1899, Elisabeth Bardwell died in Greenfield, with one of her sisters by her side. Bardwell was a proponent of balancing a faith in God with challenging assumptions, and investigating the world through observation. The tributes read at her memorial included:

"When I first met Miss Bardwell I stood in awe of her, but soon finding her sympathy and tenderness, learned to go to her in trouble."

"How safe I felt about everything I had committed to her care! How true she was to every interest and to every friend!"
