= 525 Adelaide =

Main-belt asteroid

Discovery
- Discovered by: Joel Hastings Metcalf
- Discovery site: Taunton, Massachusetts
- Discovery date: 21 October 1908

Designations
- Pronunciation: /ˈædəleɪd/
- Alternative designations: 1908 EKa; 1930 FX; 1937 JG; 1955 SE1; 1955 UF

Orbital characteristics
- Epoch 31 July 2016 (JD 2457600.5)
- Uncertainty parameter 0
- Observation arc: 107.13 yr (39129 d)
- Aphelion: 2.4746 AU (370.19 Gm)
- Perihelion: 2.0157 AU (301.54 Gm)
- Semi-major axis: 2.2452 AU (335.88 Gm)
- Eccentricity: 0.10218
- Orbital period (sidereal): 3.36 yr (1228.8 d)
- Mean anomaly: 311.640°
- Mean motion: 0° 17^{m} 34.728^{s} / day
- Inclination: 5.9953°
- Longitude of ascending node: 203.410°
- Argument of perihelion: 264.252°

Physical characteristics
- Synodic rotation period: 19.967 h (0.8320 d)
- Absolute magnitude (H): 12.53

525 Adelaide is an S-type asteroid belonging to the Flora family in the Main Belt. It was discovered on 21 October 1908 by Joel Hastings Metcalf.

Previously, the object A904 EB, discovered 14 March 1904 by Max Wolf, had been named 525 Adelaide but was subsequently lost. When it was rediscovered 3 October 1930 by Sylvain Arend as 1930 TA, it was named 1171 Rusthawelia. Some 28 years passed before the two objects were realized to be the same. 1930 TA retained the name Rusthawelia (and discovery credited to Arend); the name 525 Adelaide was reused for the object 1908 EKa.

Another confusion occurred in 1929, one year before Arend's discovery, when American astronomer Anne Sewell Young thought to have found long-lost "Adelaide", when in fact she mistook the asteroid for comet 31P/Schwassmann–Wachmann that had a very similar orbital eccentricity.

This object is orbiting the Sun at a distance of 2.245 AU with a moderate eccentricity (ovalness) of 0.10 and an orbital period of 3.36 years. The orbital plane is inclined at an angle of 6.0° relative to the plane of the ecliptic. Based on infrared observations, 525 Adelaide has a diameter of 9.326±0.239 km. It is spinning on its axis with a rotation period of 19.967 hours. The spectral classification of this asteroid is SU.
