= Alice Hall Farnsworth =

American astronomer (1893–1960)

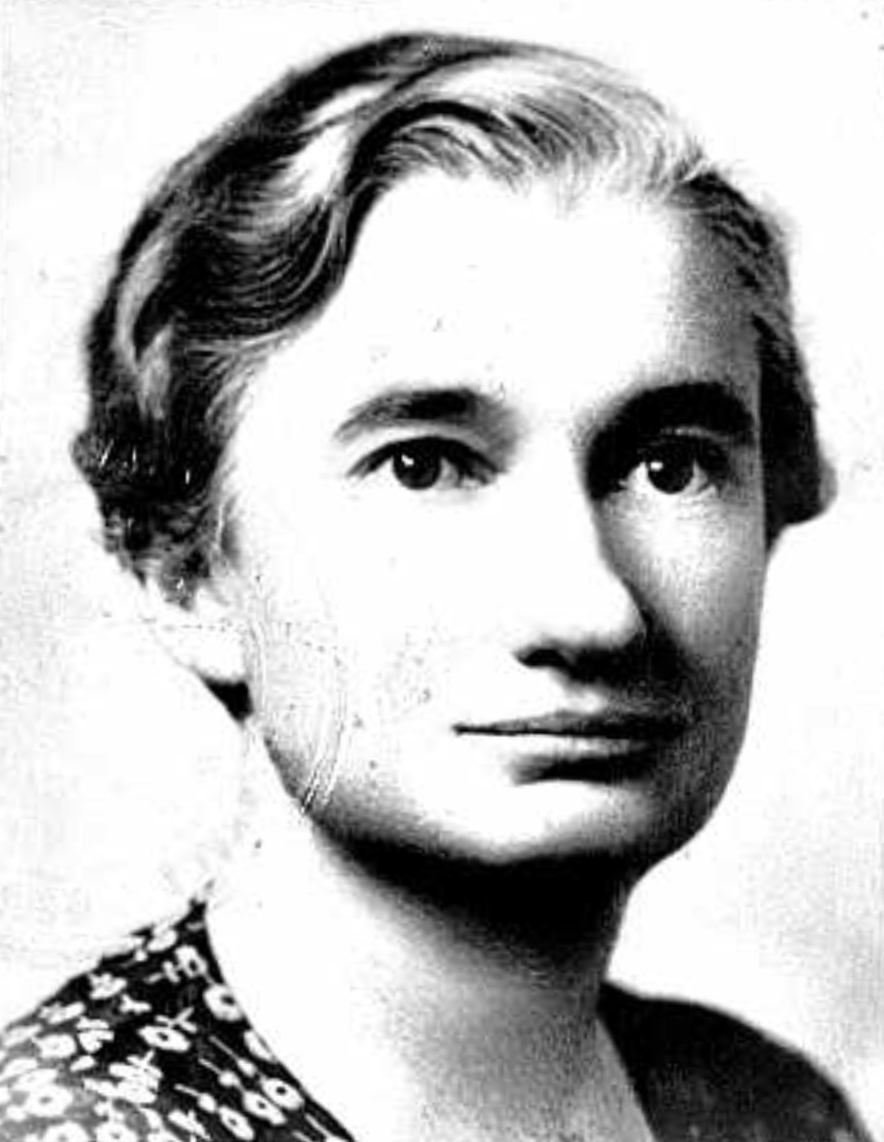
- Alice Hall Farnsworth (1940)
- Born: October 16, 1893; Williamsburg, Massachusetts, U.S.
- Died: October 1, 1960 (aged 66); Newton, Massachusetts, U.S.
- Education: Mount Holyoke College, B.S. (1916)
- Occupation: Astronomer
- Years active: 1920–1957

3rd Director of the John Payson Williston Observatory at Mount Holyoke College
- In office 1936–1957
- Preceded by: Anne Sewell Young
- Succeeded by: Mary L. Connelley

8th President of the American Association of Variable Star Observers
- In office 1929–1931
- Preceded by: David B. Pickering
- Succeeded by: Harriet Williams Bigelow

Alice Hall Farnsworth (October 19, 1893 – October 1, 1960) was an American astronomer. She was director of John Payson Williston Observatory at Mount Holyoke College from 1936 until her retirement in 1957.

== Early life ==
Alice Hall Farnsworth was born in Williamsburg, Massachusetts, the youngest of four children of Frederick Tudor Farnsworth and Anna Caroline Tufts Farnsworth. As a child, she was an active reader of St. Nicholas magazine, submitting contest entries and winning prizes.

Farnsworth studied astronomy under Anne Sewell Young at Mount Holyoke College, earning her bachelor's degree in 1916; one of Young's other notable students at the time was astronomer Helen Sawyer Hogg. Farnsworth pursued graduate studies at the University of Chicago, where she earned a master's degree in 1917 and a Ph.D. in 1920. Her dissertation, A comparison of the photometric fields of the 6-inch doublet: 24-inch reflector, and 40-inch refractor of the Yerkes Observatory, with some investigation of the astrometric field of the reflector (University of Chicago Press 1926), was based on her research at Yerkes Observatory in Wisconsin.

== Career ==
Farnsworth was elected to the membership of the American Astronomical Society in 1917. She returned to the astronomy department at Mount Holyoke after completing her doctorate. She taught astronomy courses, including darkroom skills. From 1929 to 1931 she was president of the American Association of Variable Star Observers. From 1930 to 1931 she was a visiting researcher and Martin Kellogg Fellow at Lick Observatory in California. She succeeded Anne S. Young as director of the Williston Observatory in 1936. In 1937, she was promoted to the rank of full professor. From 1938 to 1941, she served on the council of the American Astronomical Society. During a sabbatical in 1940–1941, she traveled to Brazil to observe a solar eclipse, in a small team of scientists led by Charles Hugh Smiley; she wrote about her time in South America for Popular Astronomy.

Farnsworth's research involved stars in a region of the constellation Cassiopeia, and stellar photometry; she also continued the Williston Observatory's studies of sunspots and lunar occultations. Publications by Farnsworth included "Proper Motions of Certain Long Period Variable Stars" (The Astronomical Journal 1921, with Anne Sewell Young), Zone + 45 ̊ of Kapteyn's selected areas: photographic photometry for 1550 stars (University of Chicago Press 1927, with John Adelbert Pankhurst), "Measurement of Effective Wave-Lengths with the Recording Microphotometer" (Publications of the Astronomical Society of the Pacific 1931), A study of effective wave-lengths with the recording microphotometer; Color changes in variable stars (University of California Press 1933), and "Stellar Spectra and Colors in Milky Way Region in Cassiopeia" (Astrophysical Journal Supplement 1955).

== Personal life ==
Alice Hall Farnsworth died in 1960, aged 66 years, in Newton, Massachusetts. Her papers are in the Mount Holyoke College Archives and Special Collections.
