= Tau Herculids =

Annual meteor shower in May/June

- Radiant of the Tau Herculids in 2022 near Arcturus / 9 Boo
- Parent body: 73P/Schwassmann–Wachmann

Radiant
- Constellation: Boötes
- Right ascension: 13^{h} 56^{m}
- Declination: +28°

Properties
- Occurs during: May 19 – June 19
- Date of peak: May 31
- Velocity: 16 km/s
- Zenithal hourly rate: variable (Class III)

The Tau Herculids (TAH #0061) are a meteor shower that when discovered in 1930 appeared to originate from the star Tau Herculis. The parent comet of the Tau Herculids is periodic comet Schwassmann-Wachmann 3 with a 5.4 year orbital period. This meteor shower occurs from May 19 - June 19. The meteor shower was first observed by the Kwasan Observatory in Kyoto, Japan in May 1930. The Tau Herculids' average radiant was α=236°, δ=+41°. Due to orbital perturbations of the meteor streams by Jupiter, 2022 activity will have a radiant of R.A. = 13:56 (209), Decl. = +28 (North-West of the star Arcturus in the constellation Boötes). The meteors are relatively slow moving making atmospheric entry at around 16 km/s (36,000 mph).

On 31 May 1930 the comet passed about 0.062 AU (9.3 million km; 5.8 million mi) from Earth, on 9 June 1930 a meteor outburst with a zenithal hourly rate of around 100 was observed, and then the comet passed perihelion (closest approach to the Sun) on 14 June 1930.

On 30–31 May 2022 (31 May 4:00-5:00 UT) there was a modest meteor shower generated by fragments from the 1995 break-up of the parent comet 73P. This required that fragments had been migrating ahead of the comet for the last 27 years. The parent comet has 69 known fragments and does not come to perihelion (0.97 AU from the Sun) until 25 August 2022. On 30 May 2022 comet 73P/Schwassmann–Wachmann was 1.5 AU from the Sun and 1.4 AU (210 million km) from Earth. The next notable appearances of the Tau Herculids are expected in 2033 and 2049.
