= NGC 2672 =

Galaxy in the constellation Cancer

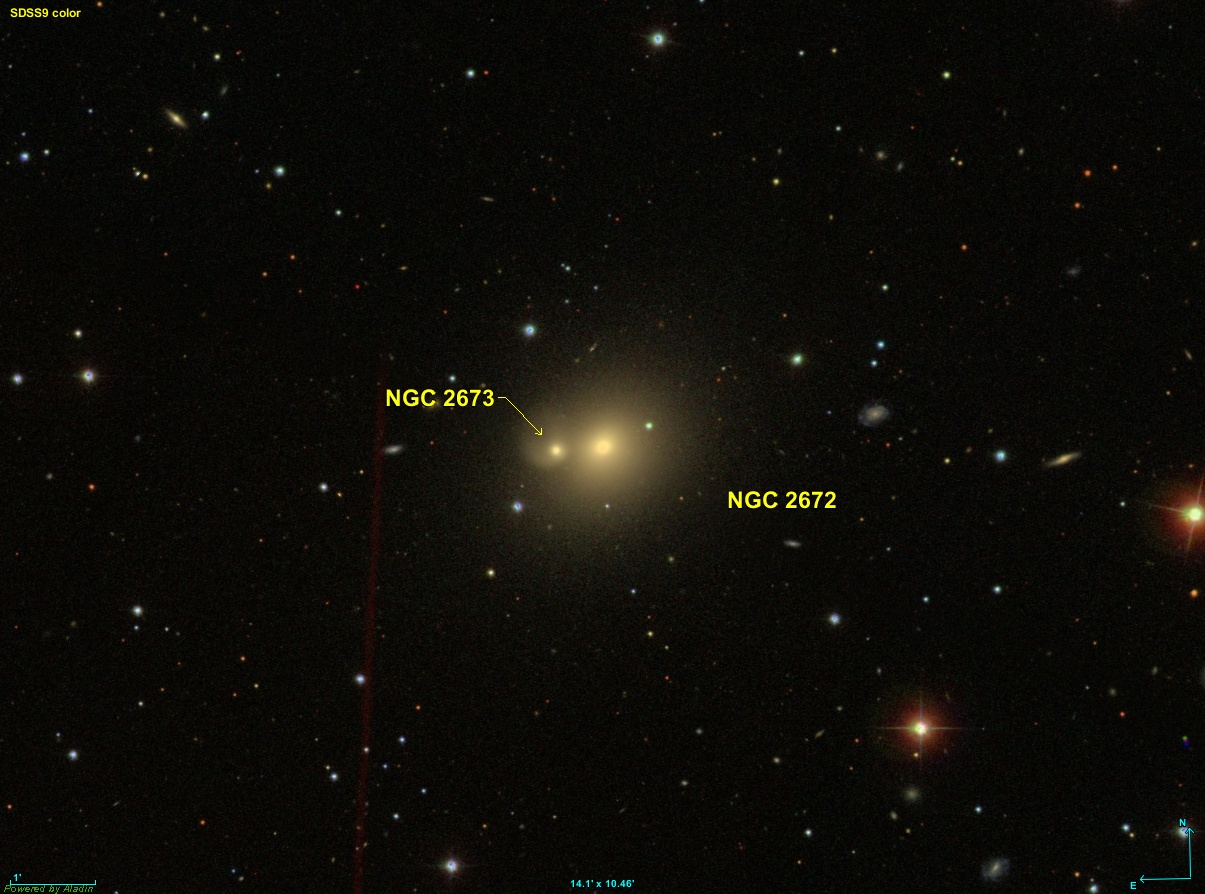
- NGC 2672 (center) and NGC 2673 (left) imaged by SDSS

Observation data (J2000 epoch)
- Constellation: Cancer
- Right ascension: 08^{h} 49^{m} 21.8884^{s}
- Declination: +19° 04′ 29.947″
- Redshift: 0.014487
- Heliocentric radial velocity: 4,343±10 km/s
- Distance: 221.8 ± 15.6 Mly (68.01 ± 4.77 Mpc)
- Group or cluster: Arp 167
- Apparent magnitude (V): 11.7

Characteristics
- Type: E1-2
- Size: ~162,200 ly (49.74 kpc) (estimated)
- Apparent size (V): 3.0′ × 2.8′

Other designations
- HOLM 99A, Arp 167, UGC 4619, MCG +03-23-010, PGC 24790, CGCG 090-019 NED01, KPG 175A

NGC 2672 is an elliptical galaxy in the constellation of Cancer. Its velocity with respect to the cosmic microwave background is 4,611±21 km/s, which corresponds to a Hubble distance of 221.8 ± 15.6 Mly (68.01 ± 4.77 Mpc). Additionally, 11 non-redshift measurements give a closer distance of 188.93 ± 19.72 Mly (57.927 ± 6.045 Mpc). It was discovered by German-British astronomer William Herschel on 14 March 1784.

The SIMBAD database lists NGC 2672 as an Active Galaxy Nucleus Candidate, i.e. it has a compact region at the center of a galaxy that emits a significant amount of energy across the electromagnetic spectrum, with characteristics indicating that this luminosity is not produced by the stars.

NGC 2672 is listed with the galaxy NGC 2673 as Holm 99 in Erik Holmberg's A Study of Double and Multiple Galaxies Together with Inquiries into some General Metagalactic Problems, published in 1937. These two galaxies are also listed in Halton Arp's Atlas of Peculiar Galaxies as Arp 167, with the description "Comp. galaxy very condensed, has curved plume." Another study indicates that the two galaxies are interacting and NGC 2673 has two tidal plumes, while NGC 2672 is only weakly disturbed.

== Supernovae ==
Two supernovae have been observed in NGC 2672:

- SN 1938B (type unknown, mag. 15.5) was discovered by Arno Wachmann in 1938.
- SN 2025yla (Type Ia-91bg-like, mag. 15.5) was discovered by the Zwicky Transient Facility on 18 January 2025.

== Other observations ==
On 29 January 1953 it was occulted by the Moon during a Total Lunar Eclipse (the January 1953 lunar eclipse) over the South Atlantic and extreme south of Africa.

== See also ==
- List of NGC objects (2001–3000)
