= 30P/Reinmuth =

Jupiter-family comet

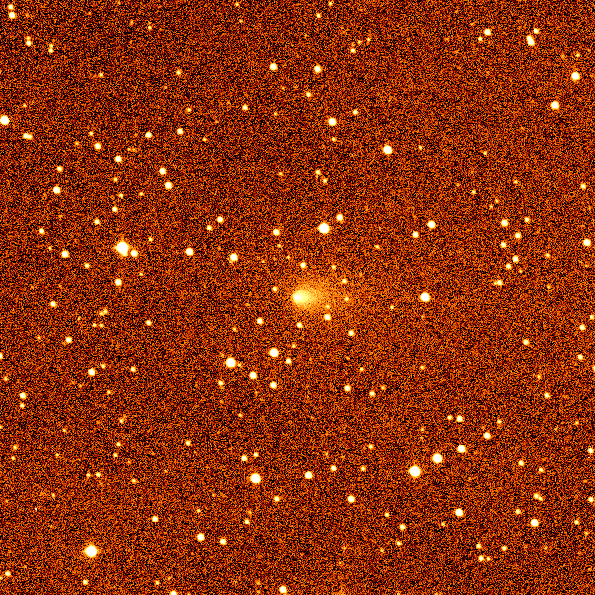
- Comet Reinmuth 1 imaged from the Palomar Transient Factory on 18 February 2010

Discovery
- Discovered by: Karl Reinmuth
- Discovery site: Heidelberg-Königstuhl State Observatory
- Discovery date: 22 February 1928

Designations
- MPC designation: P/1928 D1, P/1934 V1
- Alternative designations: 1928 I, 1935 II, 1950 IV; 1958 II, 1965 V, 1973 IV; 1980 VIII, 1988 VI

Orbital characteristics
- Epoch: 21 November 2025 (JD 2461000.5)
- Observation arc: 97.35 years (Note: Observation arc from the Minor Planet Center database only covered dates from 27 October 1949 until 29 June 2025 (75.67 years). This figure included its entire arc up to 22 February 1928.)
- Number of observations: 3,990
- Aphelion: 5.658 AU
- Perihelion: 1.814 AU
- Semi-major axis: 3.736 AU
- Eccentricity: 0.51445
- Orbital period: 7.223 years
- Inclination: 8.054°
- Longitude of ascending node: 117.23°
- Argument of periapsis: 9.535°
- Mean anomaly: 62.878°
- Last perihelion: 17 August 2024
- Next perihelion: 11 November 2031
- T_{Jupiter}: 2.837
- Earth MOID: 0.893 AU
- Jupiter MOID: 0.158 AU

Physical characteristics
- Mean radius: 3.9 km (2.4 mi)
- Comet total magnitude (M1): 13.6

Comet 30P/Reinmuth, also known as Comet Reinmuth 1, is a Jupiter-family comet with a 7.23-year orbit around the Sun. It was first discovered by Karl Reinmuth on 22 February 1928 from the Landessternwarte Heidelberg-Königstuhl in Germany.

Initial calculations of its orbit estimated a period of 25 years, but this was later revised to seven years, leading to speculation that it was the same comet as Comet Taylor, which had been lost since 1915. (Note: 69P/Taylor wasn't recovered until Charles Kowal rediscovered it from the Palomar Observatory in 1977.) Further calculations by George van Biesbroeck concluded that they were different comets.

The 1935 approach was observed, though it was not as favorable. In 1937, the comet passed close to Jupiter, which increased the perihelion distance and orbital period.

Due to miscalculations, the 1942 appearance was missed, but it has been observed on every subsequent appearance since.

The nucleus is estimated to be 7.8 km (4.8 mi) in diameter.

== Notes ==
Numbered comets
Previous; 29P/Schwassmann–Wachmann	30P/Reinmuth	Next; 31P/Schwassmann–Wachmann
