= 1171 Rusthawelia =

Main-belt asteroid

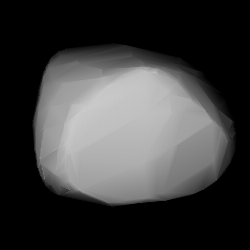
- Shape model of Rusthawelia from its lightcurve

Discovery
- Discovered by: S. Arend
- Discovery site: Uccle Obs.
- Discovery date: 3 October 1930

Designations
- Named after: Shota Rustaveli (Georgian poet)
- Alternative designations: 1930 TA · 1926 AD; 1926 FH · 1927 FC; 1949 BT · A904 EB; A913 TA
- Minor planet category: main-belt · (outer) background

Orbital characteristics
- Epoch 23 March 2018 (JD 2458200.5)
- Uncertainty parameter 0
- Observation arc: 113.85 yr (41,584 d)
- Aphelion: 3.7970 AU
- Perihelion: 2.5779 AU
- Semi-major axis: 3.1875 AU
- Eccentricity: 0.1912
- Orbital period (sidereal): 5.69 yr (2,079 d)
- Mean anomaly: 175.66°
- Mean motion: 0° 10^{m} 23.52^{s} / day
- Inclination: 3.0731°
- Longitude of ascending node: 121.78°
- Argument of perihelion: 290.57°

Physical characteristics
- Mean diameter: 70.98±2.42 km (composite estimate) Individual estimates: 68.67±16.71 km; 70.13±2.3 km; 70.216±1.560 km; 72.09±1.19 km; 72.38±20.19 km; 82.229±1.004 km
- Mass: (4.9±2.4)×10^{17} kg (Note: Calculated from its standard gravitational parameter GM = 0.033±0.016 km^{3}/s^{2}.)
- Mean density: 1.69 g/cm^{3} (Note: Assuming a diameter of 82.2 km.)
- Synodic rotation period: 10.80±0.01 h 10.98±0.01 h 11.013±0.003 h
- Geometric albedo: 0.029±0.003; 0.038±0.002; 0.0393±0.0051; 0.0394±0.003; 0.04±0.02
- Spectral type: Tholen = P · P B–V = 0.678; U–B = 0.255
- Absolute magnitude (H): 9.89; 9.90; 9.94±0.16

1171 Rusthawelia, provisional designation 1930 TA, is a large and dark background asteroid, approximately 72 kilometers (45 miles) in diameter, located in the outer regions of the asteroid belt. It was discovered on 3 October 1930, by Belgian astronomer Sylvain Arend at the Royal Observatory of Belgium in Uccle, and was an unnoticed rediscovery of a lost minor planet then known as "Adelaide". As the asteroid was already named for Georgian poet Shota Rustaveli when the rediscovery was realized, its former designation was given to another asteroid instead, which is now known as 525 Adelaide. Rusthawelia is a primitive P-type asteroid and has a rotation period of 11 hours.

== Unnoticed rediscovery of lost asteroid ==
When Arend discovered Rusthawelia in 1930, it was not realized that he rediscovered the long-lost asteroid "525 Adelaide". It was already discovered 26 years earlier as A904 EB by German astronomer Max Wolf at Heidelberg Observatory in March 1904, who observed it for a short time during the discovery opposition before it became lost. Only decades later, in 1958, it was shown by French astronomer André Patry that both asteroid's discovered by Wolf and Arend were one and the same (M.P.C. 1831). It was then decided that this asteroid retains the number–name designation "1171 Rusthawelia", while 525 Adelaide was vacated and given to another asteroid (which was the object 1908 EKa, discovered by Joel Hastings Metcalf).

Another confusion occurred in 1929, one year before Arend's discovery, when American astronomer Anne Sewell Young thought to have found long-lost "Adelaide", when in fact she mistook the asteroid for comet 31P/Schwassmann–Wachmann that had a very similar orbital eccentricity.

== Orbit and classification ==
Rusthawelia is a non-family asteroid from the main belt's background population. It orbits the Sun in the outer main-belt at a distance of 2.6–3.8 AU once every 5 years and 8 months (2,079 days; semi-major axis of 3.19 AU). Its orbit has an eccentricity of 0.19 and an inclination of 3° with respect to the ecliptic. The body's observation arc begins as A904 EB at Heidelberg in March 1904, when it was discovered by Max Wolf (see above).

== Naming ==
This minor planet was named for medieval Georgian poet Shota Rustaveli (შოთა რუსთაველი, c. 1160 – after c. 1220). The official naming citation was mentioned in The Names of the Minor Planets by Paul Herget in 1955 (H 109).

== Physical characteristics ==
Rusthawelia is a dark and primitive P-type asteroid, as characterized by the Wide-field Infrared Survey Explorer (WISE), and classified by Tholen.

=== Rotation period ===
In October and November 2003, two rotational lightcurves of Rusthawelia were obtained from photometric observations by John Menke at his observatory in Barnesville, Maryland, and by a group of American astronomers. Lightcurve analysis gave a well-defined rotation period of 10.80 and 10.98 hours and a brightness variation of 0.31 and 0.26 magnitude, respectively (U=3/3). A third, concurring period of 11.013 hours with an amplitude of 0.26 magnitude was obtained by French amateur astronomer René Roy in February 2005 (U=3).

=== Diameter and albedo ===
According to the surveys carried out by the Infrared Astronomical Satellite IRAS, the Japanese Akari satellite and the NEOWISE mission of NASA's WISE telescope, Rusthawelia measures between 68.67 and 82.23 kilometers in diameter and its surface has an albedo between 0.029 and 0.04. The Collaborative Asteroid Lightcurve Link adopts the results obtained by IRAS, that is, an albedo of 0.0394 and a diameter of 70.13 kilometers based on an absolute magnitude of 9.90.
