= Arno Arthur Wachmann =

German astronomer (1902–1990)

Asteroids discovered: 3
1465 Autonoma	20 March 1938	MPC
1501 Baade	20 October 1938	MPC
1586 Thiele	13 February 1939	MPC

Arno Arthur Wachmann (8 March 1902 – 24 July 1990) was a German astronomer and discoverer of comets and minor planets, who worked for many years at the Bergedorf Observatory in Hamburg.

With Arnold Schwassmann he co-discovered the periodic comets 29P/Schwassmann–Wachmann, 31P/Schwassmann–Wachmann and 73P/Schwassmann–Wachmann. The Minor Planet Center credits him with the discovery of 3 asteroids during 1938–1939. He also discovered supernova SN 1938B.

The inner main-belt asteroid 1704 Wachmann was named in his honor (M.P.C. 3933).
