= Anne Sewell Young =

American astronomer

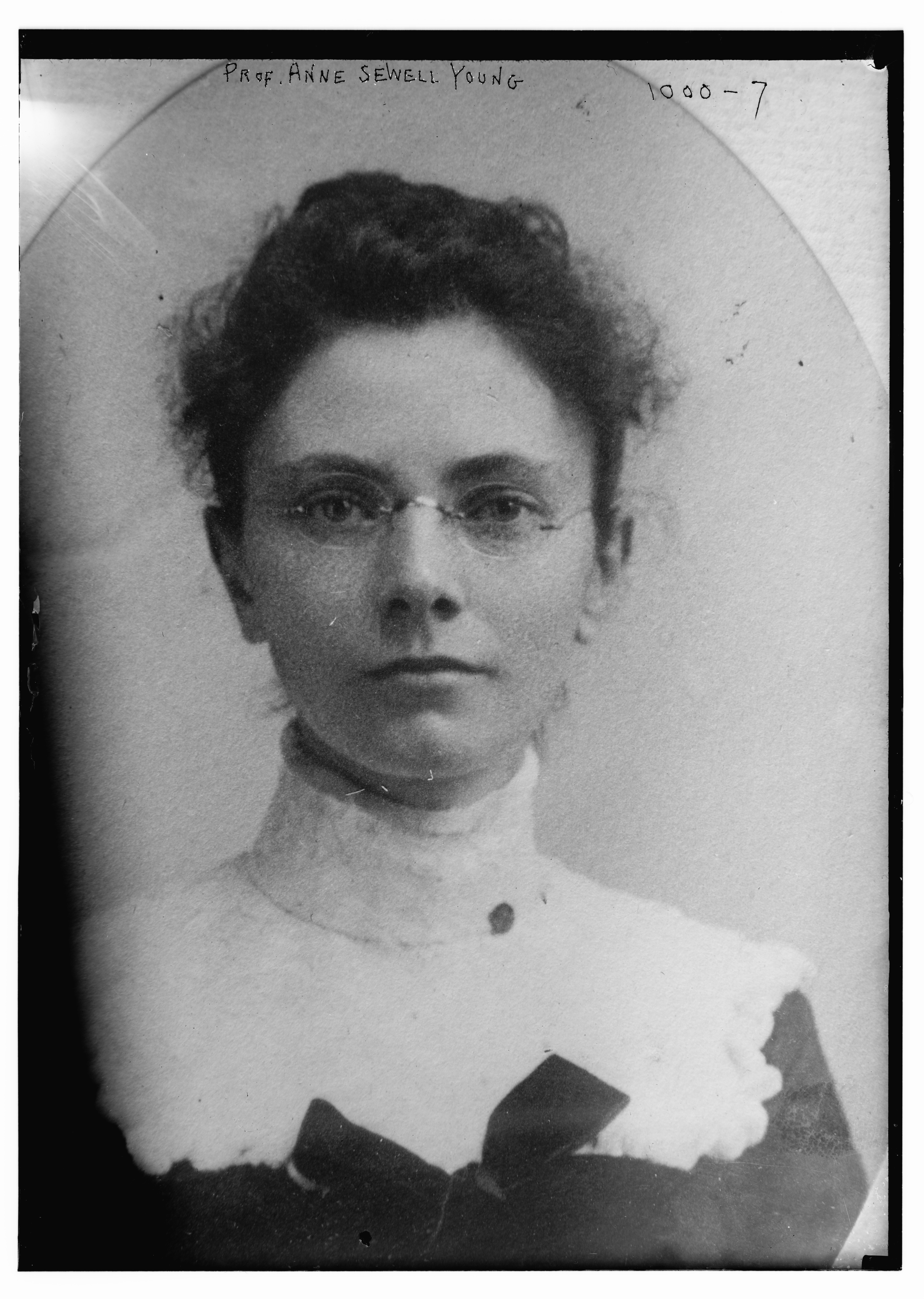
- Born: January 2, 1871; Bloomington, Wisconsin
- Died: August 15, 1961 (aged 90); Claremont, California
- Education: Carleton College; Columbia University
- Scientific career
- Fields: Astronomy
- Workplaces: Whitman College; Mount Holyoke College
- Thesis: Rutherford Photographs of the Stellar Clusters h or x Persei

Anne Sewell Young (January 2, 1871 – August 15, 1961) was an American astronomer. She was an astronomy professor at Mount Holyoke College for 37 years. Her influence on the astronomy program at Mount Holyoke was profound, and lasted far beyond her own time as one of the eight members of the American Association of Variable Star Observers (AAVSO).

== Early life ==
Anne Sewell Young was born in Bloomington, Wisconsin, on January 2, 1871, to Reverend Albert Adams Young and Mary Sewell. Young came from a family with a strong tradition and connection in astronomy. Her grandfather, Professor Ira Young, held the Chair of Natural Philosophy and Astronomy at Dartmouth College, and her great-grandfather, and uncle were all respected Dartmouth astronomers, and her great-uncle even designed the observatory at Dartmouth.

== Education ==
She earned a B.L. from Minnesota's Carleton College in 1892. She then went to Walla Walla, Washington, and taught mathematics at Whitman College for three years before returning to Carleton, earning her M.S. in 1897. She earned her Ph.D. from Columbia University in 1906. Her dissertation assessed measurements of early photographs and determined that the constellation Perseus had twice as many stars as previously thought.

== Career ==
Young started her career at Mount Holyoke College in 1898. She was appointed director of the John Payson Williston Observatory, where she supervised an observational program tracking sunspots. She organized events at the observatory for Mount Holyoke students and in 1925 arranged for the student body to take the train to central Connecticut to observe the total solar eclipse. In 1929, Young identified the comet 31P/Schwassmann–Wachmann with an object that had been misidentified as the minor planet "Adelaide" (A904 EB) in 1904. Young traced A904 EB at the University of California with assistance from J Ueta of the Kyoto Observatory in Japan.

Young had a pronounced interest in variable stars and corresponded on the subject with Edward Charles Pickering, director of the Harvard College Observatory. She was one of the eight founding members of the American Association of Variable Star Observers (AAVSO) and in 33 years contributed over 6,500 variable star observations to the organization. She was elected the organization's President in 1923.

One of the highlights of her career was organizing a special train to transport students from Mount Holyoke and other women’s colleges to a golf course in Connecticut to observe the total solar eclipse of January 24, 1925.

The next few years were Miss Young’s last before retirement in 1936. She continued her usual routine of courses, carrying out observations and speaking to amateur astronomy groups. Her last annual departmental report lamented the fact that since students were no longer required to take mathematics, there was an increasing reluctance among many to take anything involving figures. And she concluded by modestly saying that though she had always fallen short of what she hoped to accomplish, what she had achieved was largely due to the support of her co-workers. She was delighted to be able to leave the department in the capable hands of Alice Farnsworth.

In June 1936, Young retired, at the age of sixty-five, and became professor emerita. She was succeeded by her former student, Alice Hall Farnsworth, as director of the Williston Observatory. Young moved to Claremont, California, with her sister; she died there on August 15, 1961.

== Honors ==
- Young was one of eight astronomers, and the only woman of the eight that who in 1911, formed the AAVSO.
- Served as Vice President of the AAVSO in 1922-1924.
- Director of the John Payson Williston Observatory.
