= 73P/Schwassmann–Wachmann =

Multiple fragment periodic comet with 5-year orbit

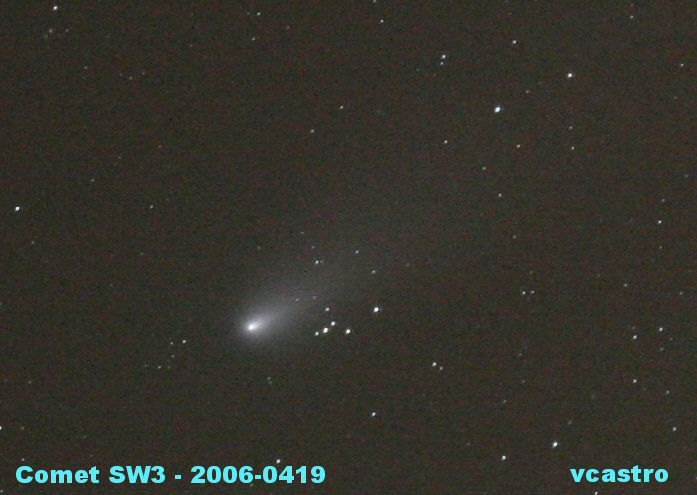
- Disrupted comet Schwassmann–Wachmann 3 (as seen from Mt Laguna on April 19, 2006)

Discovery
- Discovered by: Arnold Schwassmann; Arno Arthur Wachmann
- Discovery date: May 2, 1930

Designations
- Alternative designations: 1930 VI; 1979 VIII; 1990 VIII; 1994w

Orbital characteristics
- Epoch: 2017-Feb-16 (JD 2457800.5)
- Aphelion: 5.211 AU
- Perihelion: 0.9722 AU (0.9187 AU after 2025 Jupiter approach)
- Semi-major axis: 3.092 AU
- Eccentricity: 0.6855
- Orbital period: 5.44 yr
- Inclination: 11.237°
- Last perihelion: 24 August 2022 (BU+BV); 25 August 2022 (main); 26 August 2022 (BT)
- Next perihelion: 23 December 2027; 17 January 2028 (BV)
- Earth MOID: 0.014 AU (2.1 million km)

Physical characteristics
- Dimensions: 2.2 km (pre-1995 breakup); ~1 km (73P-C)

73P/Schwassmann–Wachmann, also known as Schwassmann–Wachmann 3 or SW3 for short, is a periodic comet that has a 5.4 year orbital period and that has been actively disintegrating since 1995. When it came to perihelion (closest approach to the Sun) in March 2017, fragment 73P-BT was separating from the main fragment 73P-C. Fragments 73P-BU and 73P-BV were detected in July 2022. The main comet came to perihelion on 25 August 2022, when the comet was 0.97 AU from the Sun and 1 AU from Earth. It was less than 80 degrees from the Sun from 25 May 2022 until August 2023. On 3 April 2025 it made a modest approach of 0.3 AU to Jupiter. 73P will next come to perihelion on 23 December 2027 when it will be 0.92 AU from the Sun and on the far side of the Sun 1.9 AU from Earth.

== Observational history ==
=== Discovery ===
Comet Schwassmann–Wachmann 3 was one of the comets discovered by astronomers Arnold Schwassmann and Arno Arthur Wachmann, working at the Hamburg Observatory in Bergedorf, Germany. The comet was discovered as the astronomers were exposing photographic plates in search of new asteroids for a minor planet survey, on 2 May 1930. On 31 May 1930 the comet passed about 0.062 AU (9.3 million km; 5.8 million mi) from Earth. The comet was lost after its 1930 apparition as the 1935 apparition had poor viewing geometry, but was recovered in 1979. During perihelion in 1985, the comet was unobserved as it was on the far side of the Sun 1.9 AU from Earth. In 1990 the comet reached apparent magnitude 9 and was the best appearance since 1930.

=== Breakup ===
In September 1995, the comet began disintegrating on its re-entry to the inner Solar System, in a reaction triggered by the Sun's heating of the comet as it emerged from the colder regions of the outer Solar System. It was seen to break into four large pieces labeled 73P-A, B, C and D. As of March 2006, at least eight fragments were known: B, C, G, H, J, L, M and N. On April 18, 2006, the Hubble Space Telescope recorded dozens of pieces of fragments B and G. It appears that the comet may eventually disintegrate completely and cease to be observable (as did 3D/Biela in the 19th century), in which case its designation would change from 73P to 73D. In May 2006, it was known to have split into at least 66 separate objects. In April 2006, fragment C was the largest and the presumed principal remnant of the original nucleus.

Video

The fragments passed Earth in May 2006, with the comet coming nearest to Earth on May 12 at a distance of 0.078 AU (11.7 million km; 7.3 million mi), a close pass in astronomical terms though with no significant threat of debris–Earth collision. With a 34-day observation arc fragment 73P-T was known to pass Earth on May 16 at roughly a distance of 0.059 AU (8.8 million km; 5.5 million mi). In 1930 when the comet passed Earth that close, there was a meteor shower on June 9 with as many as 100 meteors per hour. Analysis by P. A. Wiegert et al. suggested that a recurrence of that spectacle was unlikely.

Over many decades the fragments of 73P from 1995 and 2006 will disperse over the orbital path of 73P as they are all moving at a slightly different speed. Known fragments of 73P have orbital periods of 4.7 years (73P-AJ) to 6.1 years (73P-Y). While the main fragment of 73P came to perihelion (closest approach to the Sun) on 25 August 2022 when it was 1 AU from Earth, fragment 73P-Y (with a short 34-day observation arc) had a best-fit of being near the orbit of Jupiter about 6.0 ± 0.5 AU (898 ± 75 million km) from Earth. During the 2011 perihelion passage the primary component 73P-C was recovered on 28 November 2010 near apparent magnitude 21.3; it came to perihelion on 16 October 2011.

The non-primary fragment 73P-BT which has an observation arc of 250 days from February 2017 to October 2017 and (if it had survived) was expected to come to perihelion on 26 August 2022. On 23 July 2022 fragments JD001 (73P-BU) and JD002 (73P-BV) were detected and came to perihelion on 24 August 2022. Three additional fragments "BW, BX, and BY" that were discovered in mid-August were announced on 2 September 2022. 73P-BV had a 22-day observation arc giving it the longest observation arc of the five fragments discovered in 2022.

73P/Schwassmann–Wachmann closest Earth approach around 2070-Jul-12 ± 3 days
Date & time of closest approach	Earth distance (AU)	Sun distance (AU)	Velocity wrt Earth (km/s)	Velocity wrt Sun (km/s)	Uncertainty region (3-sigma)	Reference
2070-Jul-12 ± 3 days	0.119 AU (17.8 million km; 11.1 million mi; 46 LD)	0.943 AU (141.1 million km; 87.7 million mi; 367 LD)	12.0	39.9	± 400 thousand km	Horizons

== Orbit ==
Schwassmann–Wachmann has an orbital period of 5.4 years and has an Earth-MOID of 0.014 AU (2.1 million km; 1.3 million mi). At aphelion (farthest distance from the Sun) the comet often makes approaches to Jupiter as it did in 1965 and will in 2167. On 12 May 2006 the comet passed 0.0783 AU (11.71 million km; 7.28 million mi) from Earth.

== Physical characteristics ==
Schwassmann–Wachmann 3 was originally estimated to have a pre-breakup nucleus diameter of approximately 2.2 km (1.4 mi). In 2005, fragment C was estimated to be about 1.0 km (0.62 mi) in diameter.

== Exploration ==
The comet was to have been visited by the CONTOUR comet nucleus probe on June 18, 2006, but contact with the probe was lost on August 15, 2002 when it fired its Star 30BP solid rocket motor to inject itself into solar orbit.

== Meteor shower ==
Comet 73P/Schwassmann–Wachmann is a parent body of meteor shower Tau Herculids and the 1995 break-up of the comet generated a modest meteor shower around 31 May 2022 4:00-5:00 UT that lasted a few hours.

== Image gallery ==
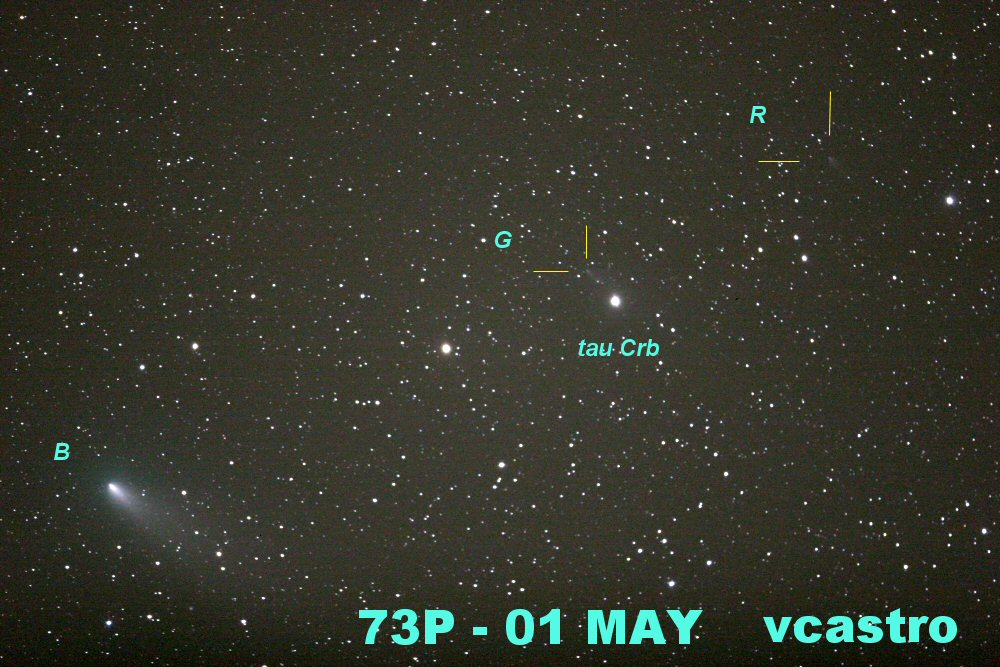
The B, G and R components of 73P, and Tau Coronae Borealis, May 1, 2006

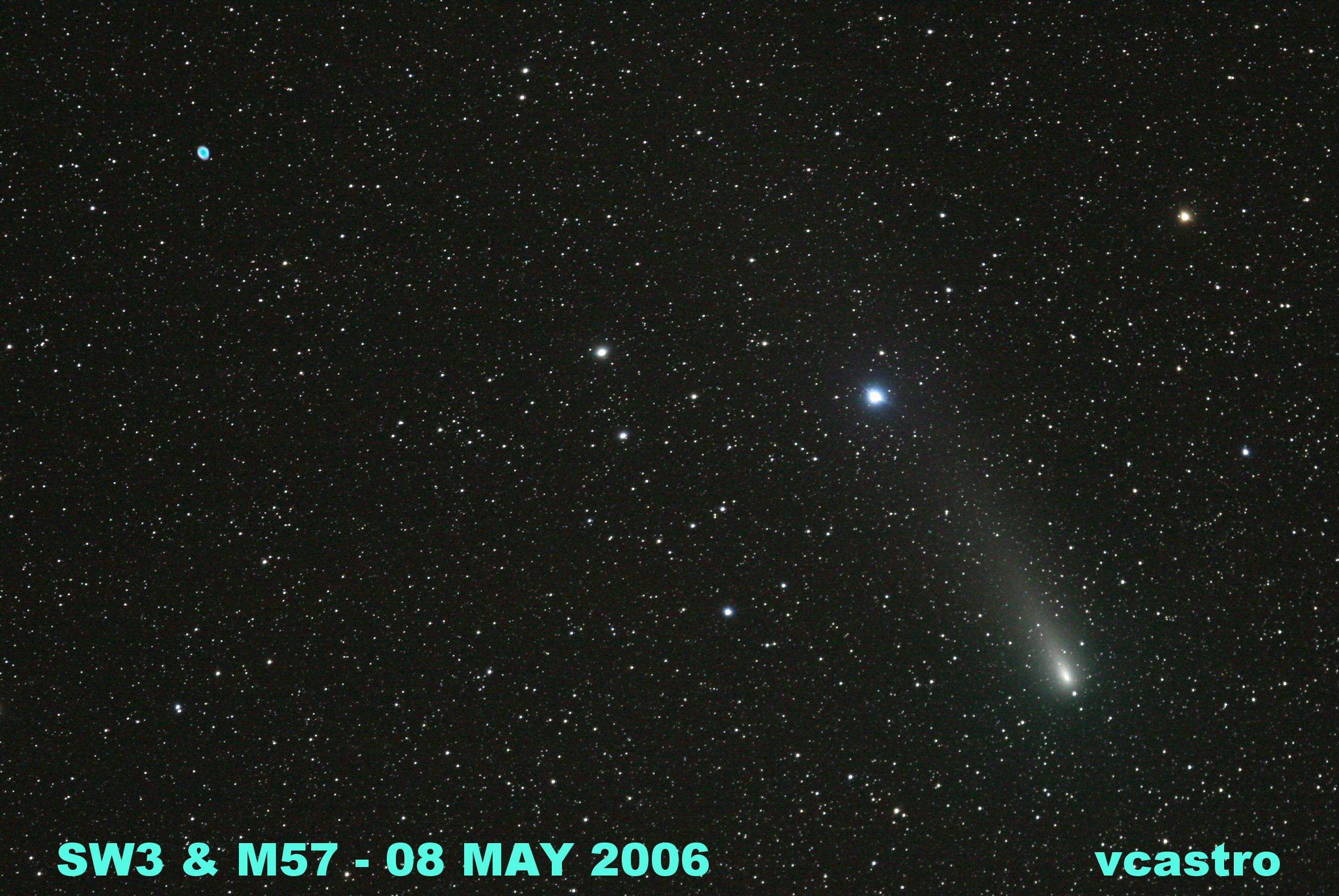
The C component of 73P, and the Ring Nebula, May 8, 2006

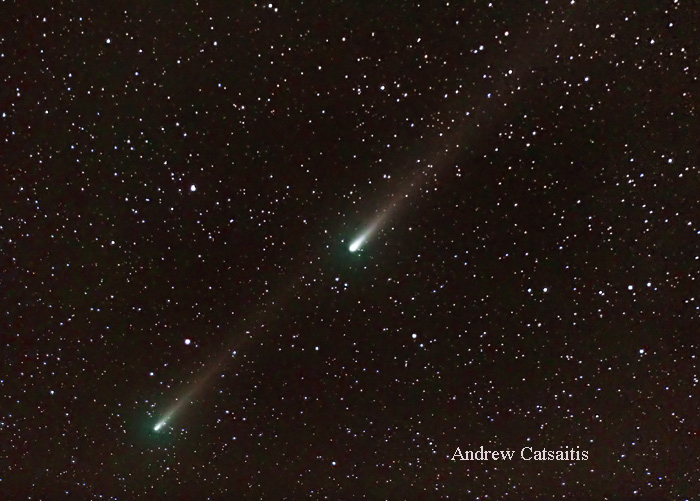
Image taken by Andrew Catsaitis of components B and C of Comet 73P/Schwassmann–Wachmann 3 as seen together on 31 May 2006

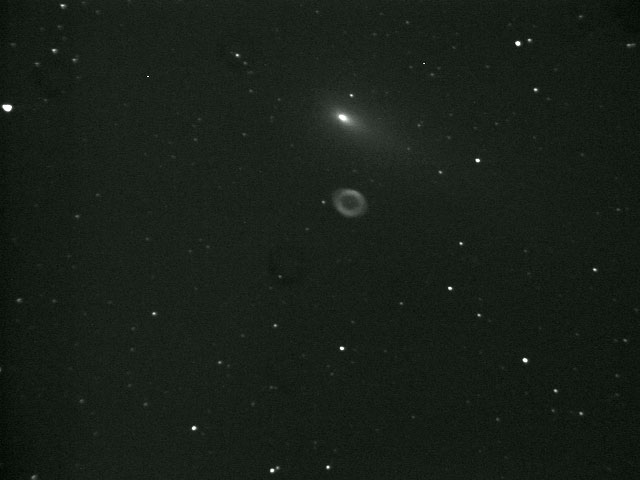
Image of fragment C passing the Ring Nebula taken on 7 May 2006 at St. Francis Xavier University in Antigonish, Nova Scotia, Canada

Component B as seen by the Hubble Space Telescope. Also available as Video clip.

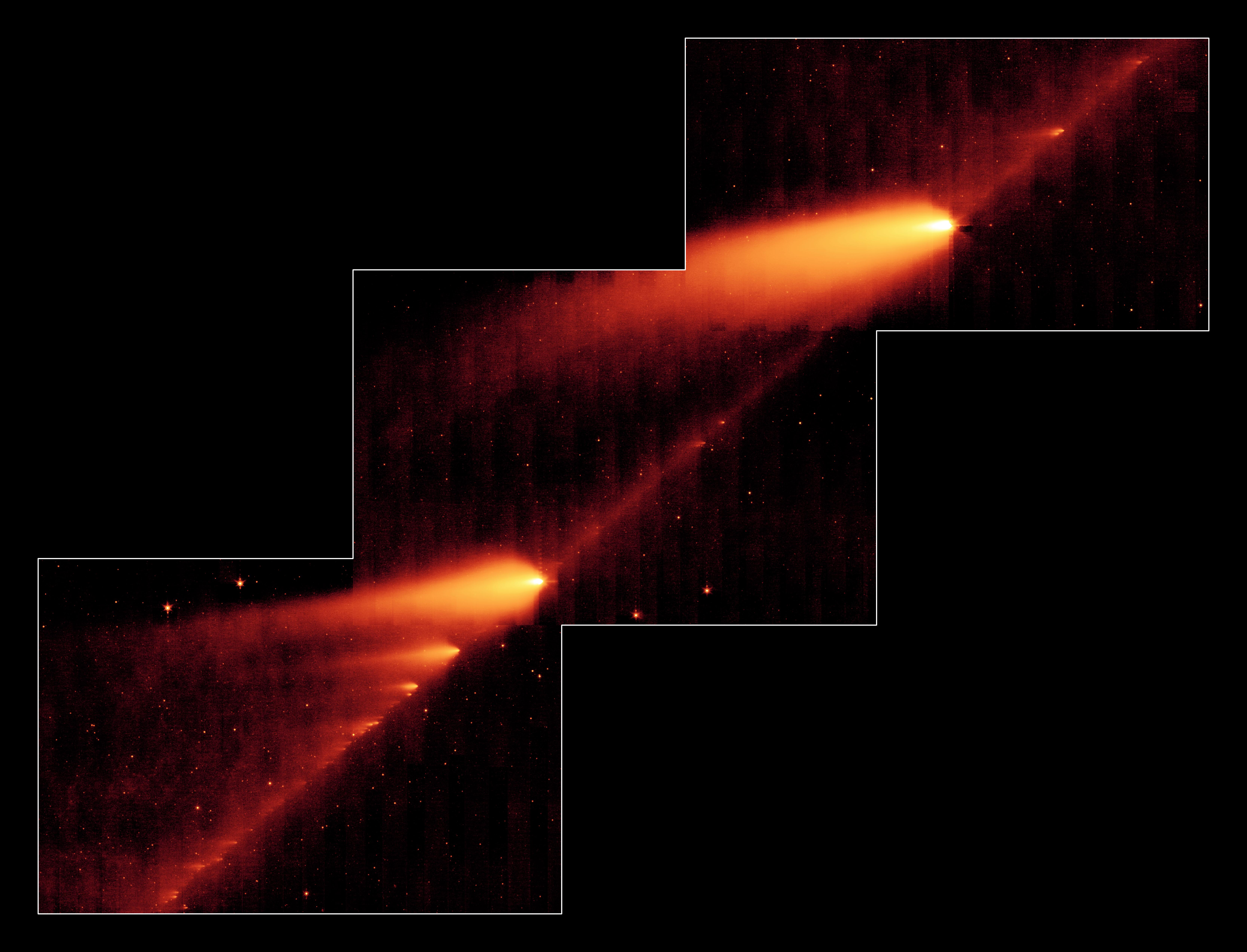
Image by the Spitzer Space Telescope

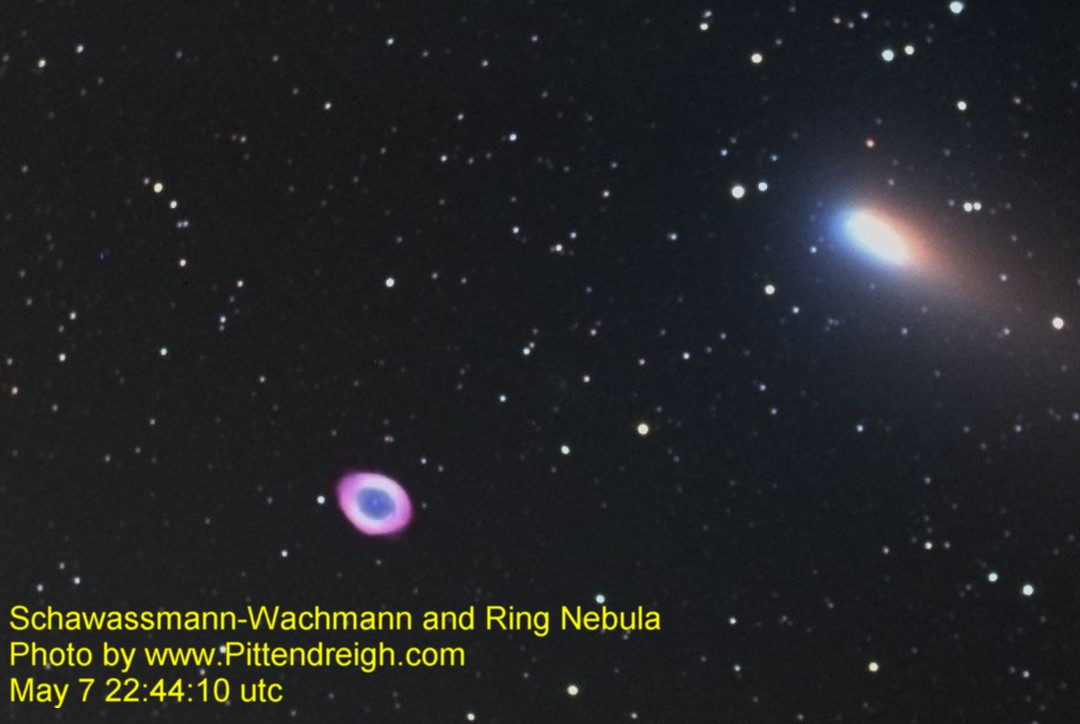
Comet Schwassmann–Wachmann passes in the field of view of the Ring Nebula on 7 May 2006. Photo by Maynard Pittendreigh

== See also ==
- 141P/Machholz
- 332P/Ikeya–Murakami

Numbered comets
Previous; 72P/Denning–Fujikawa	73P/Schwassmann–Wachmann	Next; 74P/Smirnova–Chernykh
