= 29P/Schwassmann–Wachmann =

Periodic comet with 14 year orbit

- 29P/Schwassmann–Wachmann imaged by Gemini Observatory in 2021

Discovery
- Discovered by: Arnold Schwassmann; Arno Arthur Wachmann
- Discovery site: Hamburg Observatory
- Discovery date: November 15, 1927

Designations
- MPC designation: P/1902 E1; P/1927 V1
- Alternative designations: 1908 IV; 1927 II; 1941 VI; 1957 IV; 1974 II; 1989 XV

Orbital characteristics
- Epoch: January 1, 2023 (JD 2459945.5)
- Observation arc: 13.83 years
- Earliest precovery date: 4 March 1902
- Number of observations: 622
- Aphelion: 6.318 AU (30 September 2026)
- Perihelion: 5.777 AU
- Semi-major axis: 6.047 AU
- Eccentricity: 0.0447
- Orbital period: 14.87 years
- Max. orbital speed: 12.7 km/s
- Inclination: 9.364°
- Longitude of ascending node: 312.39°
- Argument of periapsis: 50.913°
- Last perihelion: March 7, 2019
- Next perihelion: February 18, 2035
- T_{Jupiter}: 2.986
- Earth MOID: 4.781 AU
- Jupiter MOID: 0.792 AU

Physical characteristics
- Dimensions: 60.4 ± 7.4 km (37.5 ± 4.6 mi)
- Synodic rotation period: 58 days
- Geometric albedo: 0.033
- Comet total magnitude (M1): 10.1
- Apparent magnitude: ~14

Comet 29P/Schwassmann–Wachmann, also known as Schwassmann–Wachmann 1, was discovered on November 15, 1927, by Arnold Schwassmann and Arno Arthur Wachmann at the Hamburg Observatory in Bergedorf, Germany. It is popular with citizen scientists as it is a large comet 60 km in diameter and is known for being observable throughout the whole orbit and having frequent outbursts where it brightens by 2-3 magnitudes. The most recent outbursts were in April 2026, May 2026, and November 2026. The comet came to solar conjunction on 26 September 2026 and aphelion on 30 September 2026. It will next come to opposition on 5 April 2027. It crossed the celestial equator in late 2025 and is headed further into southern skies until April 2029 when it will have a declination of −31°.

== Discovery ==
It was discovered photographically, when the comet was in outburst and the magnitude was about 13. Precovery images of the comet from March 4, 1902, were found in 1931 and showed the comet at 12th magnitude.

== Orbit and physical properties ==
The comet reached its most recent perihelion on March 7, 2019. It spends its entire orbit just beyond Jupiter at 5.8–6.3 AU from the Sun where the comet remains active with a coma as it is close to the snow line. It reached aphelion on 30 September 2026.

The comet is a member of a class of objects called "centaurs", of which more than 1000 are known. These are small icy bodies with orbits between those of Jupiter and Neptune. The centaurs have been recently perturbed inward from the Kuiper belt, a disk of trans-Neptunian objects occupying a region extending from the orbit of Neptune to approximately 50 AU from the Sun. Frequent perturbations by Jupiter will likely accumulate and cause the comet to migrate either inward or outward by the year 4000. A number of centaurs appear to be dynamically and perhaps even physically related to 29P; such objects may traverse the coma of 29P when in outburst.

The comet nucleus is estimated to be 60.4±7.4 kilometers in diameter. As of 2026, the comet has a rotation period of about 58 days.

== Outbursts ==
The comet is unusual in that while normally hovering at around 16th magnitude, it suddenly undergoes an outburst. This causes the comet to brighten by 1 to 5 magnitudes. This happens with a frequency of 7.3 outbursts per year, fading within a week or two. The magnitude of the comet has been known to vary from 18th magnitude to 10th magnitude, a more than thousand-fold increase in brightness, during its brightest outbursts. Between 2014 and 2026, there have been 120 outbursts observed or about 10 outbursts per year. Outbursts are very sudden, rising to maximum in about 2 hours, which is indicative of their cryovolcanic origin; and with the times of outburst modulated by an underlying 58-day periodicity possibly suggesting that its large nucleus is an extremely slow rotator.

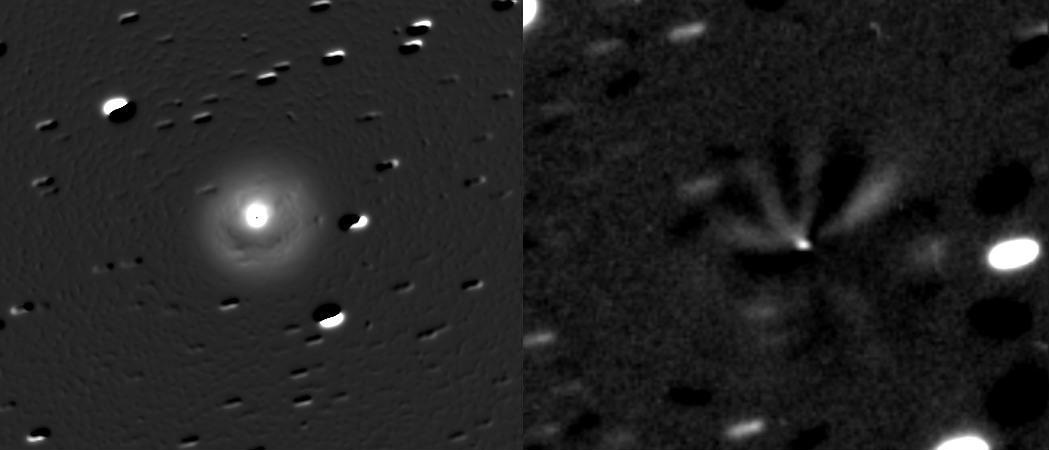
Comet 29P after outburst, this is a stack of 20 images centered on the comet's movement, frames taken with a 0.40m telescope F10 + CCD at La Cañada Observatory (MPC-J87) 04-Oct-2008 02:24 UT the stacked images have been Larson–Sekanina filtered to enhance the details, on the left a radial process with delta = −1 px to better show the expanding shells of gas and dust, on the right a rotational gradient with alpha=15 degrees displaying various jets.

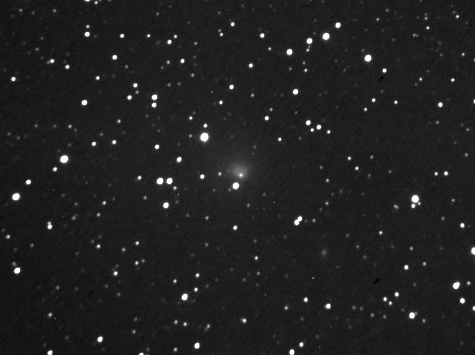
Comet 29P photographed at Ka-Dar Observatory

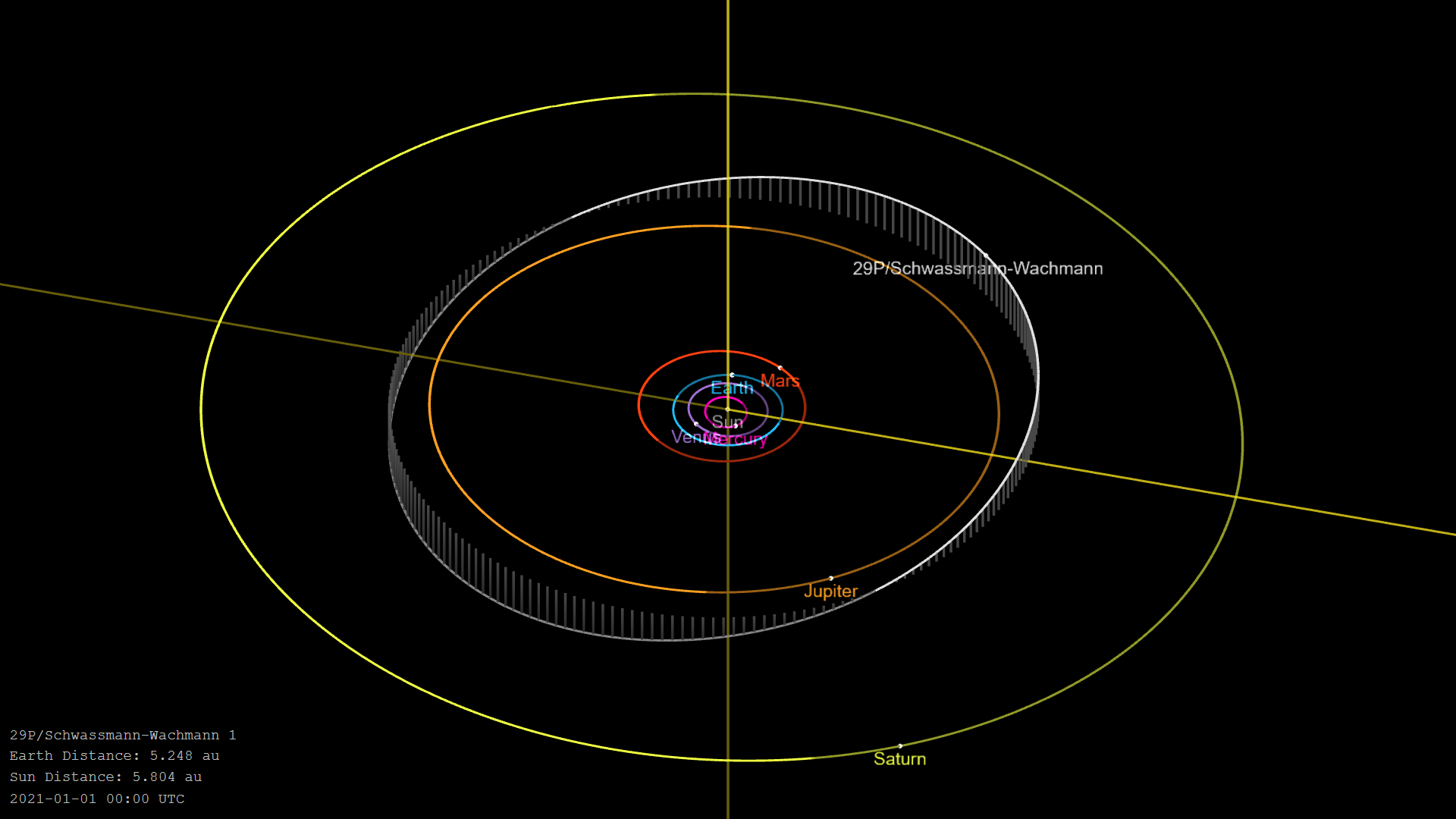
The quasi-circular orbit of 29P/Schwassmann–Wachmann compared to Jupiter and Saturn

During 2025, there were 8 notable outbursts occurring as four pairs of twin events: January 2/6, February 1/2, May 13/25, and December 4/11. The December outburst reached about magnitude 13.

In 2026, there was an outburst on February 9/15 to magnitude 12.6V. On April 15 there was outburst from magnitude 16 to 13. Another outburst occurred on May 29. An outburst occurred around November 4 when it had a solar elongation of about 32 degrees.

Numbered comets
Previous; 28P/Neujmin	29P/Schwassmann–Wachmann	Next; 30P/Reinmuth
