= John Payson Williston Observatory =

Astronomical observatory

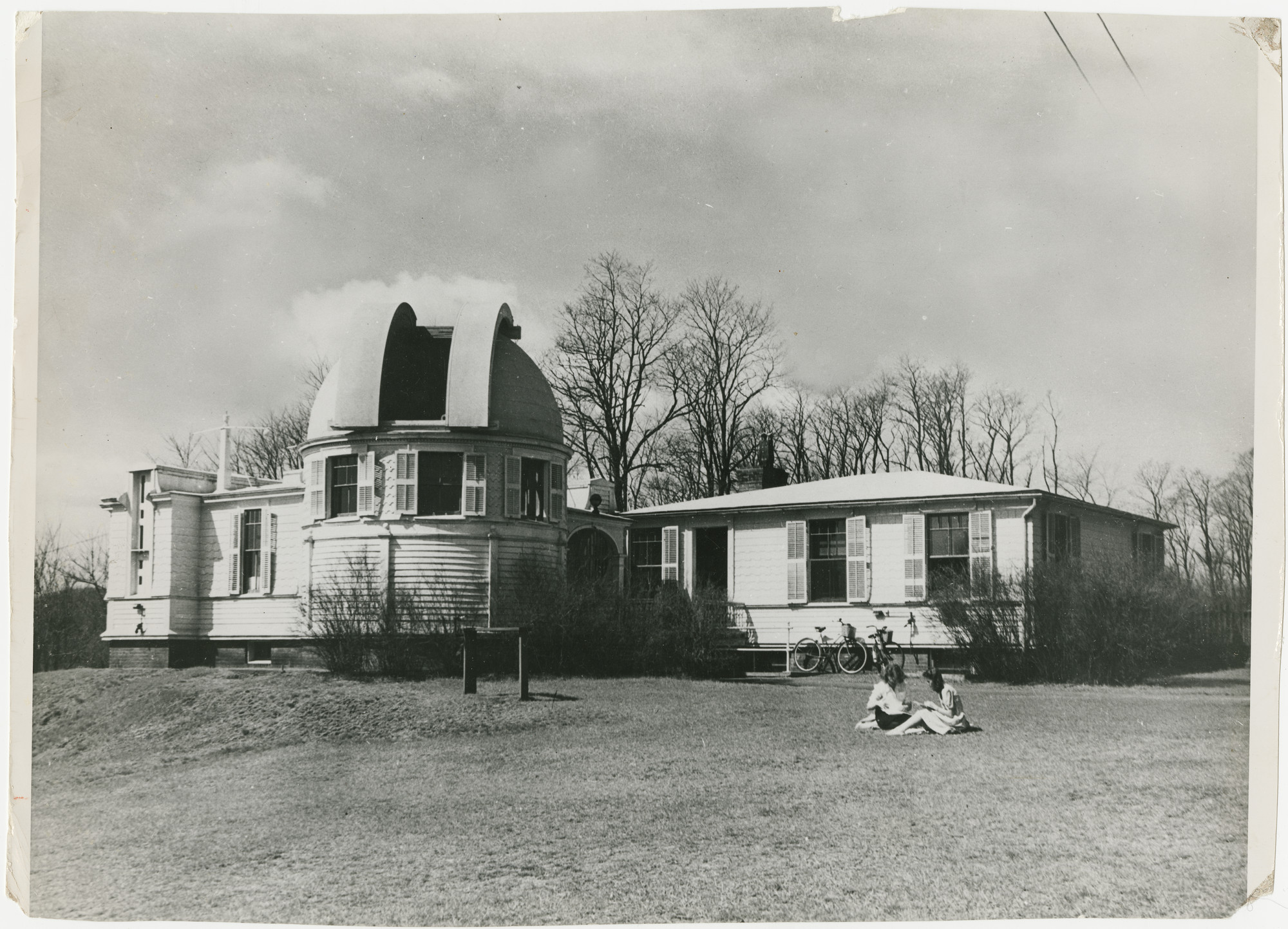
- The Williston Observatory, circa 1945-1955
- Organization: Mount Holyoke College
- Location: Jewett Lane; South Hadley, Massachusetts, United States
- Coordinates: 42°16′N 72°16′W
- Altitude: 231 ft (70 m)
- Weather: South Hadley Weather
- Established: 1881

Telescopes
- Refractor telescope: 8" Alvan Clark refractor telescope

The John Payson Williston Observatory is an astronomical observatory located at the highest point on the Mount Holyoke College campus. Constructed in 1881, the observatory is a modest building with a rare 8" Alvan Clark refractor telescope created just before his death in 1887. It is maintained and operated by the Mount Holyoke College Astronomy Department.

== See also ==
- List of astronomical observatories
