= 31P/Schwassmann–Wachmann =

Periodic comet with 8 year orbit

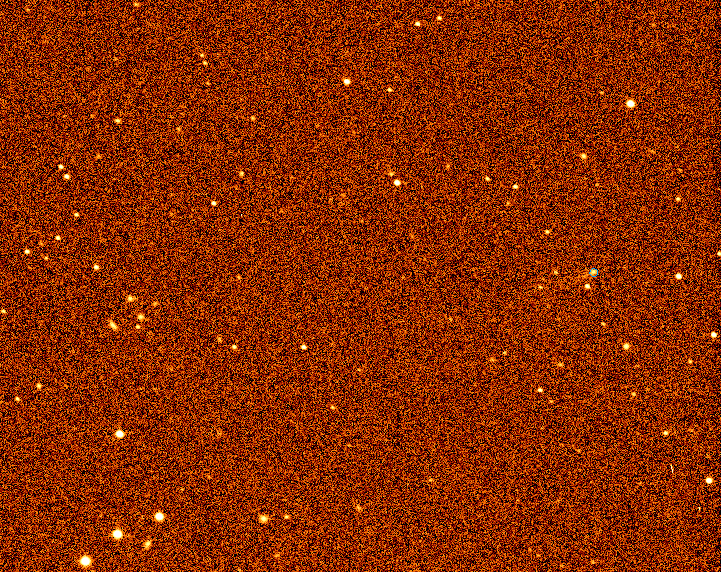
- Comet Schwassmann–Wachmann 2 observed on 14 February 2011

Discovery
- Discovered by: Arnold Schwassmann; Arno Arthur Wachmann
- Discovery date: 17 January 1929

Designations
- MPC designation: P/1929 B1, P/1934 X1
- Alternative designations: 1929 I, 1935 III, 1942 I; 1948 VII, 1955 I, 1961 VII; 1968 II, 1974 XIII, 1981 VI; 1987 XIX, 1994 II

Orbital characteristics
- Epoch: March 6, 2006
- Aphelion: 5.048 AU
- Perihelion: 3.416 AU
- Semi-major axis: 4.232 AU
- Eccentricity: 0.1928
- Orbital period: 8.705 a
- Inclination: 4.5487°
- Last perihelion: 6 July 2019
- Next perihelion: 19 March 2028

Physical characteristics
- Mean diameter: 6.2 km (3.9 mi)
- Mean density: 0.46 g/cm^{3}
- Synodic rotation period: 5.58±0.03 hours
- Comet total magnitude (M1): 7.2
- Comet nuclear magnitude (M2): 14.0

31P/Schwassmann–Wachmann, also known as Schwassmann–Wachmann 2, is a periodic comet in the Solar System. It was discovered on 17 January 1929, at an apparent magnitude of 11. The comet has been seen at every apparition.

The comet nucleus is estimated to be 6.2 km (3.9 mi) in diameter. In 1929, the astronomer Anne Sewell Young identified the comet with an object that had been misidentified as the minor planet "Adelaide" (A904 EB).

Numbered comets
Previous; 30P/Reinmuth	31P/Schwassmann–Wachmann	Next; 32P/Comas Solà
