= Sara Anderson Immerwahr =

American classical archaeologist (1914–2008)

- Born: August 28, 1914; Royersford, Pennsylvania
- Died: June 25, 2008 (aged 93); Chapel Hill, North Carolina
- Occupations: Archaeologist and art historian
- Spouse: Henry Rudolph Immerwahr (m. 1944)

Academic background
- Education: Mount Holyoke College; Bryn Mawr College
- Thesis: The Mycenaean Pictorial Style of Vase Painting in the Thirteenth Century B.C. (1943)

Academic work
- Discipline: Classical archaeology
- Institutions: The University of North Carolina at Chapel Hill

Sara Anderson Immerwahr (August 28, 1914 – June 25, 2008) was an American Classical archaeologist.

== Life ==
Immerwahr earned her bachelor's degree from Mount Holyoke College in 1935. One of her tutors at Mount Holyoke was archaeologist Caroline Morris Galt. She gained her Ph.D. from Bryn Mawr College in 1943 with a dissertation entitled "The Mycenaean Pictorial Style of Vase Painting in the Thirteenth Century B.C."

She was married to Henry Rudolph Immerwahr from 1944 until her death. She served as faculty member in both classics and art history at the University of North Carolina at Chapel Hill.

In 2021 the American School of Classical Studies at Athens named a suite after her and her husband.

== Scholarship ==
- 1990. Aegean painting in the Bronze Age. University Park: Pennsylvania State University Press.
- 2004. Sara Anderson Immerwahr and Anne Proctor Chapin. Charis: essays in honor of Sara A. Immerwahr. Princeton NJ: American School of Classical Studies at Athens.

== Students ==
- 1970. Thomas, Nancy R. (Nancy Ann Rhyne), "The Aegean Animal Style: A Study of the Lion, Griffin, and Sphinx", Ph.D., Department of Art, University of North Carolina at Chapel Hill.
- 1972. Gesell, Geraldine C. The Archaeological Evidence for the Minoan House Cult and its Survival in Iron Age Crete. Ph.D., Department of Classics, University of North Carolina at Chapel Hill.
- 1974. Cross, Toni Marie. Bronze Tripods and Related Stands in the Eastern Mediterranean from the Twelfth Through Seventh Centuries BC. Ph.D., Department of Classics, University of North Carolina at Chapel Hill.
- 1975. Mattusch, Carol C. Casting Techniques of Greek Bronze Sculpture: Foundries and Foundry Remains from the Athenian Agora with Reference to Other Ancient Sources. Ph.D., Department of Classics, University of North Carolina at Chapel Hill.
- 1981. Haskell, Halford W. The Coarse Ware Stirrup Jars of Crete and the Cyclades. Ph.D., Department of Classics, University of North Carolina at Chapel Hill.
- 1981. Sutton, Robert F. The Interaction Between Men and Women Portrayed on Attic Red-figure Pottery. Ph.D., Department of Classics, University of North Carolina at Chapel Hill.
