= Caroline Ransom Williams =

American egyptologist and classical archaeologist (1872–1952)

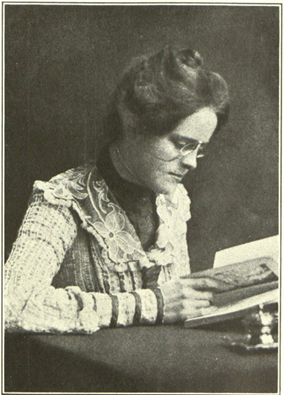
- Bryn Mawr College Yearbook, 1908
- Born: Caroline Louise Ransom; February 24, 1872; Toledo, Ohio
- Died: February 1, 1952 (aged 79)
- Occupations: Egyptologist; classical archaeologist
- Spouse: Grant Williams (after 1916)

Academic background
- Education: Lake Erie College; Mount Holyoke College; University of Chicago; University of Berlin
- Thesis: Studies in ancient furniture (1905)
- Doctoral advisor: James Henry Breasted

Caroline Ransom Williams (February 24, 1872 – February 1, 1952) was an Egyptologist and classical archaeologist. She was the first American woman to be professionally trained as an Egyptologist. She worked extensively with the Metropolitan Museum of Art (MMA) in New York and other major institutions with Egyptian collections, and published Studies in ancient furniture (1905), The Tomb of Perneb (1916), and The Decoration of the Tomb of Perneb: The Technique and the Color Conventions (1932), among others. During the Epigraphic Survey of the University of Chicago Oriental Institute's first season in Luxor, she helped to develop the "Chicago House method" for copying ancient Egyptian reliefs.

== Early life and education ==
Caroline Louise Ransom was born on February 24, 1872, to John and Ella Randolph Ransom, wealthy Methodists in Toledo, Ohio. Ransom attended Lake Erie College and Mount Holyoke College, where she earned a B.A. in 1896, graduating Phi Beta Kappa.

Her aunt Louise Fitz Randolph taught archaeology and art history at Mount Holyoke College, and was a strong influence on Caroline Louise. After graduating from college, Ransom accompanied her aunt to Europe and Egypt, before teaching for a year at Lake Erie College.

In 1898 she joined the newly formed degree program in Egyptology at the University of Chicago. It was the first program of its kind in the United States, and Caroline Ransom was the first woman in the program. She received her Master of Arts in classical archaeology and Egyptology in 1900. The director of the Oriental Institute in Chicago, James Henry Breasted, became not only a mentor but a lifelong friend and correspondent of Ransom. Their letters are preserved in the Oriental Institute's archives.

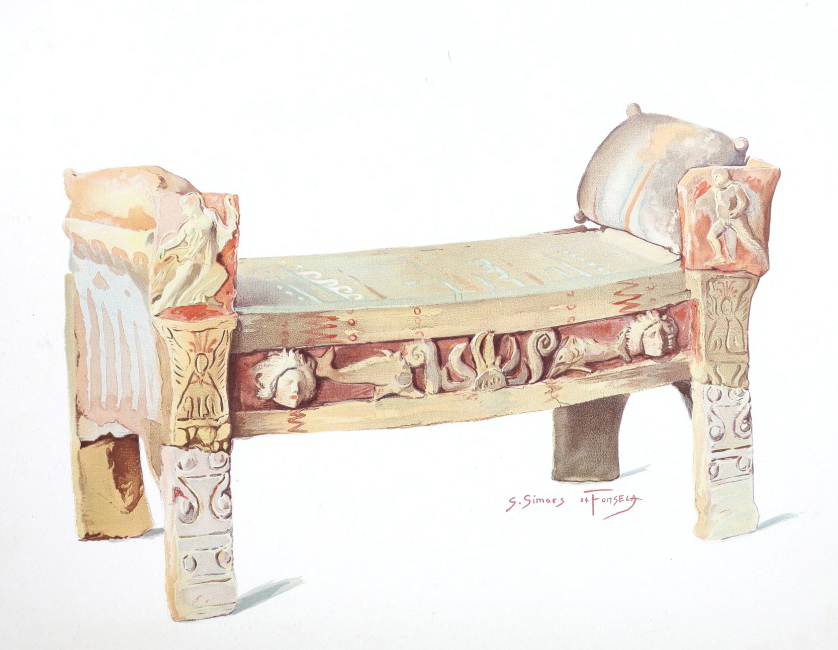
Frontispiece, Studies in ancient furniture: Couches and beds of the Greeks, Etruscans, and Romans, 1905

Ransom was encouraged by Breasted to pursue further studies abroad. She spent time in Athens, attending lectures at the American School of Classical Studies at Athens and visiting the National Archaeological Museum, Athens. She went to Germany, where she studied at the University of Berlin from 1900 to 1903 with Adolf Erman. She received an Assistanceship in the Egyptian Department of the Berlin Museum in 1903.

Back in Chicago, she wrote her doctoral dissertation under Breasted's supervision. In 1905, Ransom received her Ph.D. in Egyptology, becoming the first American woman to receive an advanced degree in the field. Her thesis was published in 1905 as Studies in ancient furniture: Couches and beds of the Greeks, Etruscans, and Romans by the University of Chicago Press. Ransom was commended for the work's "thoroughness and sane judgment" and for her ability to engage both the classical student and the general reader.

== Career ==
From 1905 to 1910, Ransom was an assistant professor of Archaeology and Art at Bryn Mawr College in Pennsylvania, eventually becoming chair of her department. She also served on the managing committee of the American School of Classical Studies at Athens. In 1909, Ransom became the first female (corresponding) member of the Deutsches Archäologisches Institut (German Archaeological Institute), founded in 1898. She also participated in the Deutsche Orient-Gesellschaft (DOG, German Oriental Society). Such affiliations connected Ransom to an international community of current scholars and reinforced her position as an active member of the academic world. In 1909–1910 she was a vice-president of the Pennsylvania chapter of the Archaeological Institute of America.

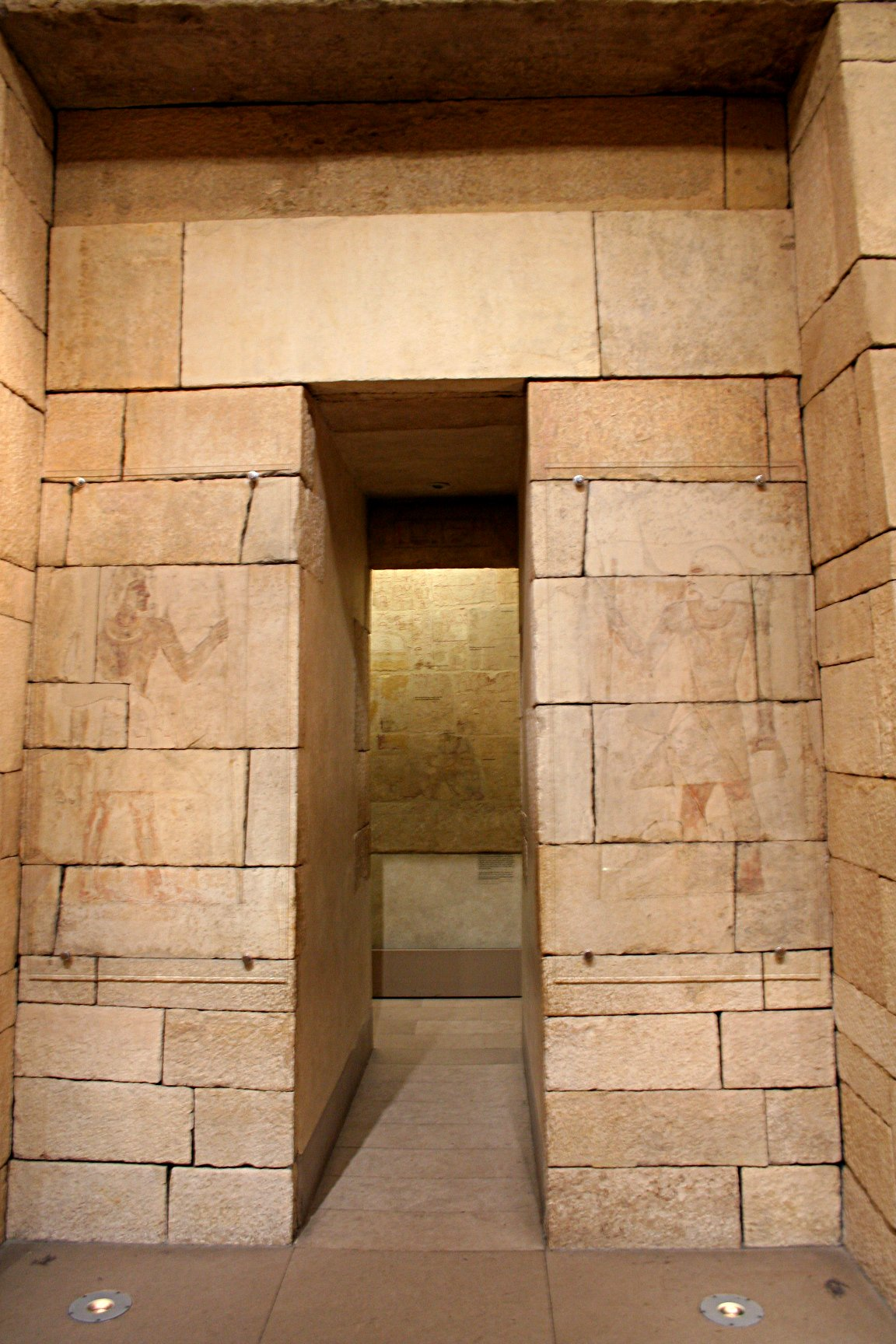
Entrance to the Tomb of Perneb at MMA

In 1910 she became assistant curator in the recently established Department of Egyptian Art of the Metropolitan Museum of Art (MMA) in New York under the direction of First Curator Albert M. Lythgoe. From 1910 to 1916, she worked with the artifacts in the collections, co-authoring the Handbook of the Egyptian Collection of the Museum (1911). In 1912, Ransom received an honorary doctorate (Litt. D.) from Mount Holyoke College on its 75th anniversary.

Between 1913 and 1916, the Tomb of Perneb was moved from Egypt and reconstructed at the Metropolitan Museum. While Lythgoe and others were in the field during the winter, Ransom supervised the American side of the work. This included administration and planning for the reception and installation of the pieces of the tomb, and for the exhibit's opening. Reconstructing the tomb took three years. It opened to the public in 1916. The opening was accompanied by the publication of an 80-page booklet, The Tomb of Perneb, co-written by Lythgoe and Ransom.

In 1916 Ransom married Grant Williams, a real estate developer in Toledo, Ohio, and returned there to live. Although they did not have children, family obligations to her husband and aging mother limited Ransom's ability to take on major professional commitments. She continued to work with the Metropolitan Museum of Art and the New York Historical Society (NYHS) by commuting from Toledo, Ohio, to New York several times a year. In the winter of 1916/17 she catalogued the Egyptian collections of the Cleveland Museum of Art and the Minneapolis Institute of Arts. In 1918, she catalogued the Egyptian holdings of the Detroit Museum of Art and the Toledo Museum of Art. From 1917 to 1924, she was a curator of the Egyptian holdings of the New York Historical Society, cataloguing the Abbott Collection of Egyptian Antiquities.

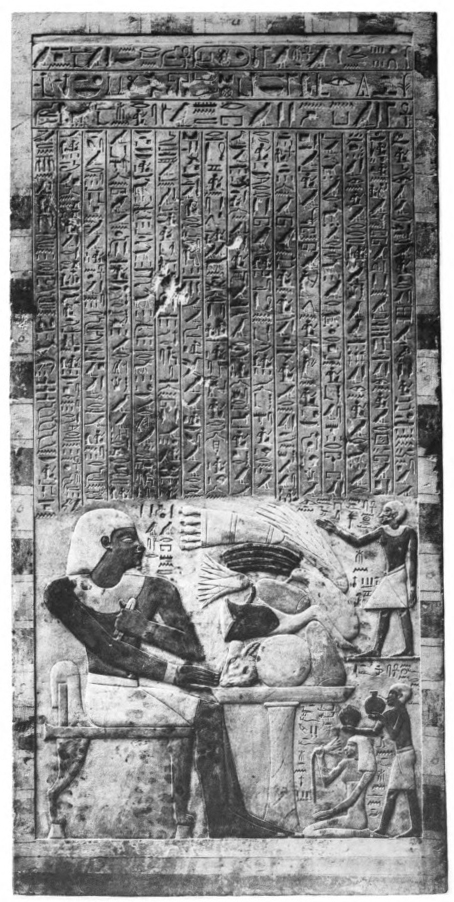
Frontispiece, The Stela of Menthu-Weser, 1913

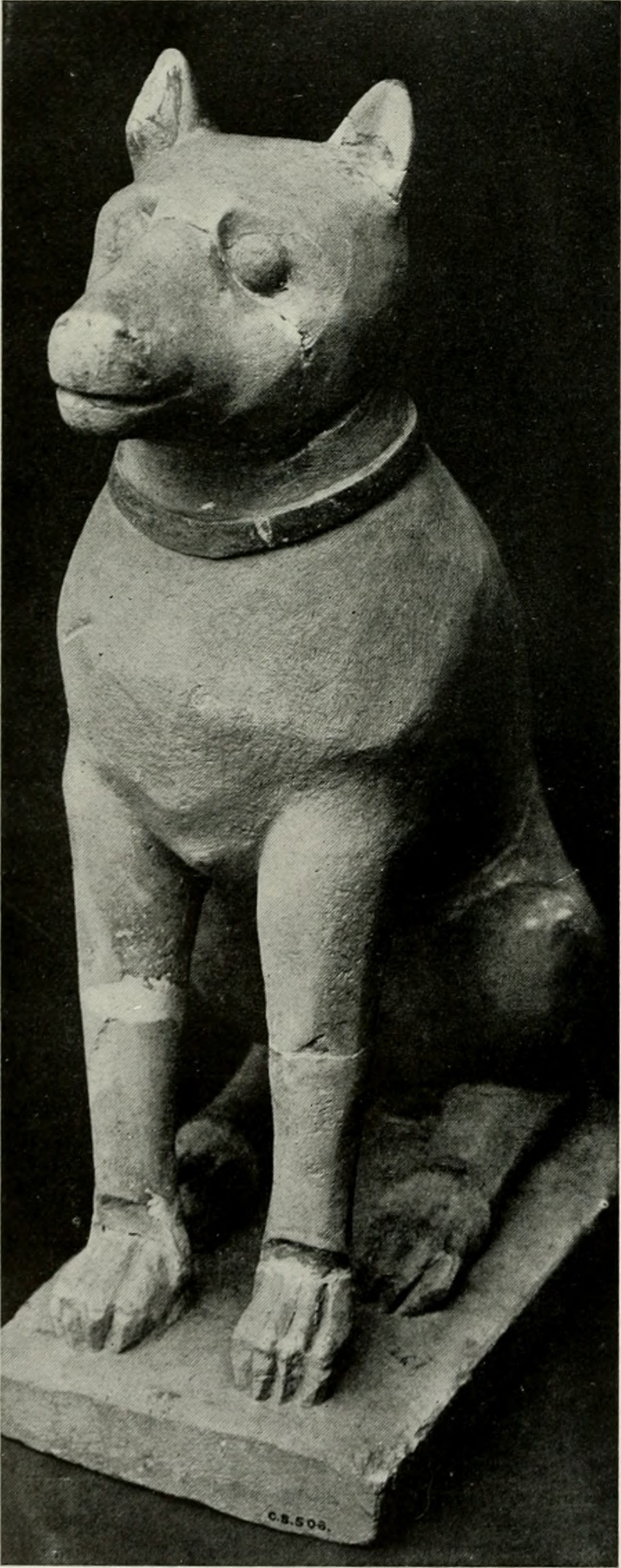
Erect-eared hound from Cyprus; 300–400 B.C. Metropolitan Museum of Art

She repeatedly refused offers that would have required relocating to Chicago, New York, or Egypt. In a number of cases, most notably that of the Edwin Smith Medical Papyrus, she directed potentially prestigious work to others.

The papyrus is probably the most valuable one owned by the Society and I am ready to waive my interest in it, in the hope that it may be published sooner and better than I could do it.

— Ransom Williams to Breasted, Letter, November 22, 1920

During the 1926/27 season, Caroline Ransom Williams took part in the Epigraphic Survey of the inscriptions at Luxor, at the invitation of Breasted of the University of Chicago. She was one of four epigraphers on staff, the others being William F. Edgerton, John A. Wilson and the director of the site, Harold H. Nelson; all were former students of Breasted. In the Oriental Institute's report, Breasted expressed his "profound appreciation that Dr. Williams worked an entire season at Medinet Habu out of pure interest in the project and with almost no remuneration." Ransom Williams worked on the Mortuary Temple of Ramesses III at Medinet Habu. She is credited with largely establishing the epigraphic standards for the group's work, with the assistance of Edgerton and Wilson.

In 1927/28 she was the first lecturer in Egyptian Art and Archaeology at the University of Michigan. In 1929, Ransom Williams became president of the Mid-West Branch of the American Oriental Society. She was the first woman officer of the AOS.

In 1932, she published The Decoration of the Tomb of Perneb. The Technique and the Color Conventions. The book was a study of the Tomb of Perneb, which had been moved from Egypt and reconstructed at the Metropolitan Museum between 1913 and 1916.

Around 1935, Ransom Williams worked with the Minneapolis Institute of Arts (MIA) to catalog their Drexel Collection. She returned to Egypt in 1935–36, to work with the Coffin Texts at the Egyptian Museum in Cairo. In 1937 she received an honorary degree from the University of Toledo.

Grant Williams died December 24, 1942, following a long illness. Caroline Ransom Williams died on February 1, 1952, after a short illness.

== Publications ==
- Studies in ancient furniture: Couches and beds of the Greeks, Etruscans, and Romans. Chicago: University of Chicago Press, 1905
- Handbook to the Egyptian Rooms. New York: The Metropolitan Museum of Art, 1911
- The Stele of Mentu-weser. New York: The Metropolitan Museum of Art, 1913
- The Tomb of Perneb. Co-written with Albert M. Lythgoe. New York: The Metropolitan Museum of Art, 1916
- The New York Historical Society Catalogue of Egyptian Antiquities, Numbers 1–160. Gold and silver jewellery and related objects. New York: New York Historical Society, 1924
- The Decoration of the Tomb of Per-neb. The Technique and the Color Conventions. New York: The Metropolitan Museum of Art, 1932
