= Louise Fitz Randolph =

American art historian (1851–1932)

Louise Fitz-Randolph
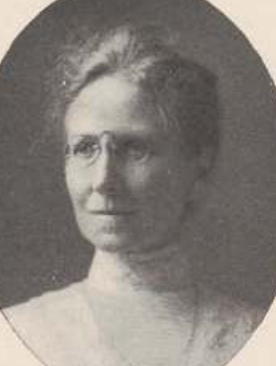
- Louise Fitz-Randolph, from the 1910 yearbook of Mount Holyoke College
- Born: Louisa Phebe Fitz-Randolph; June 25, 1851; Panama, New York
- Died: December 29, 1932 (aged 81); Toledo, Ohio
- Occupations: Art historian, college professor
- Relatives: Lee Fritz Randolph (nephew), Caroline Ransom Williams (niece)

Louisa Phebe Fitz-Randolph (June 25, 1851 – December 29, 1932), known as Louise Fitz-Randolph, was an American art historian and college professor. She taught archaeology and art history courses at Mount Holyoke College from 1892 to 1912, and built the school's collections of art, photographs, engravings and texts about the classical world.

== Early life and education ==
Louise Fitz-Randolph was born in Panama, New York, the daughter of Reuben Fitz Randolph and Julia Bell Randolph. She earned a bachelor's degree in 1872 and received a master's degree in 1904, both at Mount Holyoke College. She also studied at schools in London, Paris, Berlin, Zürich, Rome, Athens, Chicago, and New York.

== Career ==
Fitz-Randolph taught at Lake Erie Seminary in Ohio, from 1876 to 1890. From 1890 to 1892, she traveled in Europe with her niece, Caroline Ransom Williams, who became a noted Egyptologist and curator. In 1892 she joined the faculty of Mount Holyoke College, where she taught art history and archaeology courses and built the school's collections of art, photographs, engravings, and texts. She joined the Archaeological Institute of America in 1889. She was a member of the Classical Association of Western New England and corresponded with archaeologist Esther Boise Van Deman. She became a full professor in 1904. She was a speaker at a meeting of the Mount Holyoke Alumnae of New York, alongside Ida Tarbell and Lyman Abbott.

Fitz-Randolph retired as professor emerita in 1912. In 1905, she was succeeded in teaching archaeology at Mount Holyoke by Caroline Morris Galt. A gallery of plaster casts at the school was named for her.

== Personal life ==
Fitz-Randolph died in 1932, while visiting her sister's family in Toledo, Ohio, aged 81 years. Her estate continued to make gifts to the Mount Holyoke College Art Museum for decades after her death, until as recently as 2013. Mount Holyoke College offers the Louise Fitz-Randolph Fellowship in Art, for Mount Holyoke alumnae pursuing graduate studies in art history, archaeology, or the history of architecture.
