= Caroline Morris Galt =

American college professor

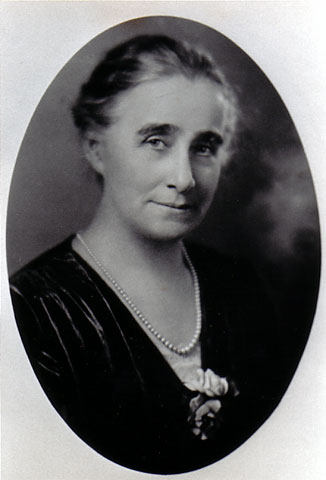
- Born: November 6, 1875; Aurora, Illinois, U.S.
- Died: January 17, 1937 (aged 61); South Hadley, Massachusetts, U.S.
- Occupations: College professor of art history, Greek, and archaeology

Caroline Morris Galt (November 6, 1875 – January 17, 1937) was an American college professor. She taught Greek, Latin, art history and archaeology courses at Mount Holyoke College, and was the first woman appointed as an annual professor at the American School of Classical Studies at Athens.

== Early life and education ==
Galt was born in Aurora, Illinois, the daughter of Thomas Galt and Jeannette McFarlane Galt. Her mother was born in Glasgow, Scotland. She had a sister Jeannette, a sister Mary, and a brother Thomas.

Caroline Galt earned a bachelor's degree at Bryn Mawr College in 1897, and pursued further studies at the University of Chicago and Columbia University. She was enrolled at the American School of Classical Studies in Rome in 1910 and 1911.

== Career ==
Galt taught Greek and mathematics at the Pennsylvania College for Women in Pittsburgh after college. She taught Latin at Mount Holyoke College starting in 1903, but was listed with the faculty only from 1908 to 1937. She taught Greek and Latin, and took over much of the work of art history and archaeology professor Louise Fitz Randolph in 1913. Her sisters, Mary Wallace Galt and Jeannette Rachel Galt, also taught at Mount Holyoke (mathematics and Latin, respectively).

Galt taught a variety of courses throughout her time as an associate professor of archaeology at Mount Holyoke College. During the 1919-1920 academic year, she instructed classes on Egyptian archaeology, Roman archaeology, and Greek sculpture.

Galt published articles on "a bronze statuette whose monumental beauty alone merits publication", on "a sculptured marble fragment" from Aptera, and on the "secluded life led by Greek women of the Hellenic Period". In 1924 she toured through several northeastern states lecturing on "The Romans in Egypt."

Galt organized the Mount Holyoke Friends of Art. In 1925, she was the first woman appointed as an annual professor at the American School of Classical Studies at Athens. She was a member of the Classical League, the Archaeological Institute of America, the American Philological Association, and the American Numismatic Society. One of her students at Mount Holyoke was archaeologist Sara Anderson Immerwahr.

== Death ==
Galt died of cancer on January 17th, 1937, in South Hadley, Massachusetts, at 61 years old.
