= Henry Rudolph Immerwahr =

Prof. Henry Rudolph Immerwahr
- Born: Heinrich Rudolf Immerwahr; February 28, 1916; Breslau, German Empire
- Died: September 15, 2013 (aged 97); Chapel Hill, North Carolina, US
- Occupation: Classical scholars
- Known for: Greek epigraphy
- Spouse: Sara Anderson Immerwahr

Academic background
- Education: University of Florence; Yale University

Academic work
- Institutions: Yale University; The University of North Carolina at Chapel Hill

Henry Rudolph Immerwahr (February 28, 1916 – September 15, 2013) was a German-born American Classicist known for his work on Attic scripts, and Greek epigraphy.

== Life ==
Immerwahr was born on February 28, 1916 in Breslau, German Empire (now Wrocław, Poland). The eldest son of Kurt Immerwahr and Johanna Freund Immerwahr, he was educated at the University of Florence (1934-1938). Immerwahr then emigrated to the United States, earned a Ph.D. at Yale University in 1942 and then performed military service for three years during World War II. He returned to Yale after the war and taught there until 1957, at which point he moved to the University of North Carolina. Immerwahr served as Professor of Greek in the Department of Classics at the University of North Carolina at Chapel Hill from 1957 until his retirement in 1977, at which point he became Director of the American School of Classical Studies at Athens, serving in that capacity until 1982.

Immerwahr received a Guggenheim fellowship to study at the American School of Classical Studies at Athens in 1946.

He was married to the archaeologist Sara Anderson Immerwahr.

== Scholarship ==
- 1966. Form and thought in Herodotus. Cleveland, Published for the American Philological Association [Chapel Hill, N.C.] by the Press of Western Reserve University.
- 1990. Attic Script: a Survey. Oxford: Clarendon Press.
- 2009. Corpus of Attic vase inscriptions. 2nd ed.

== Necrology ==
- Stadter, Philip A. "HENRY R. IMMERWAHR†" Gnomon 86. Bd., H. 2 (2014), p. 191 (1 page)
