= Tomb of Perneb =

Ancient Egyptian mastaba-style tomb

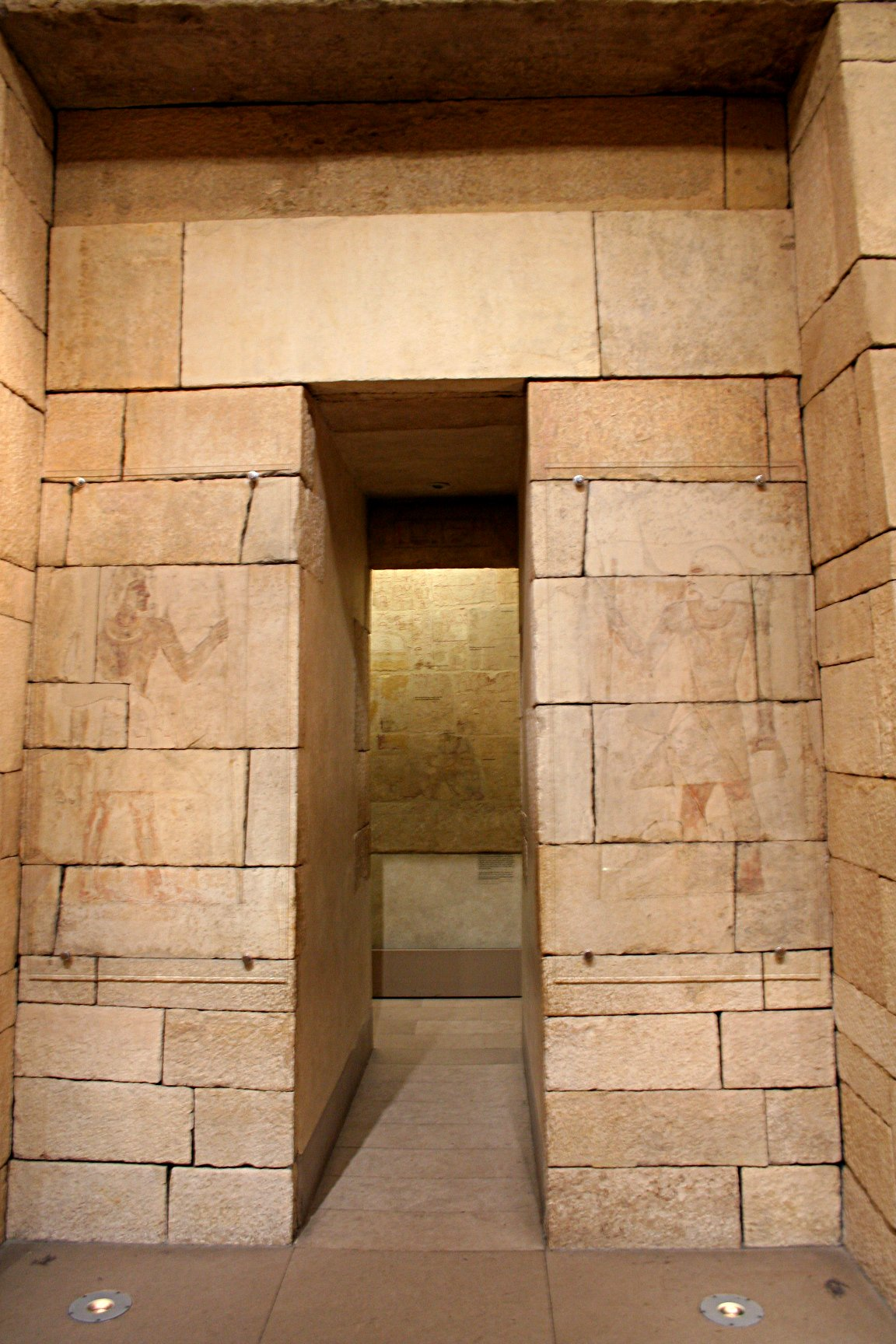
- Entrance leading to the main offering chapel in the Tomb of Perneb, The Met, New York Burial site of Perneb
- Type: Tomb
- Location: New York City, New York, United States

History
- Built: c. 2375 BC

Site notes
- Material: Limestone
- Discovered: 1907

The Tomb of Perneb is a mastaba-style tomb from ancient Egypt, built during the reigns of Djedkare Isesi and Unas (c. 2381 BC to 2323 BC), in the necropolis of Saqqara, north of King Djoser's Step Pyramid and about 30 kilometers south of Giza, Egypt. It was the tomb of Perneb, and from the size and placement of the tomb he might have been a court official or royal family member, who had a role in the robing and crowning of the king.

The tomb was erected during the 5th Dynasty in the Old Kingdom. It was discovered in 1907, purchased from the Egyptian government in 1913 and given to the Metropolitan Museum of Art in New York City by Edward Harkness.

Perneb's name means "lord of the house". His tomb was attached to the larger tomb of the vizier Shepsesre, who may have been Perneb's father.

== Description ==
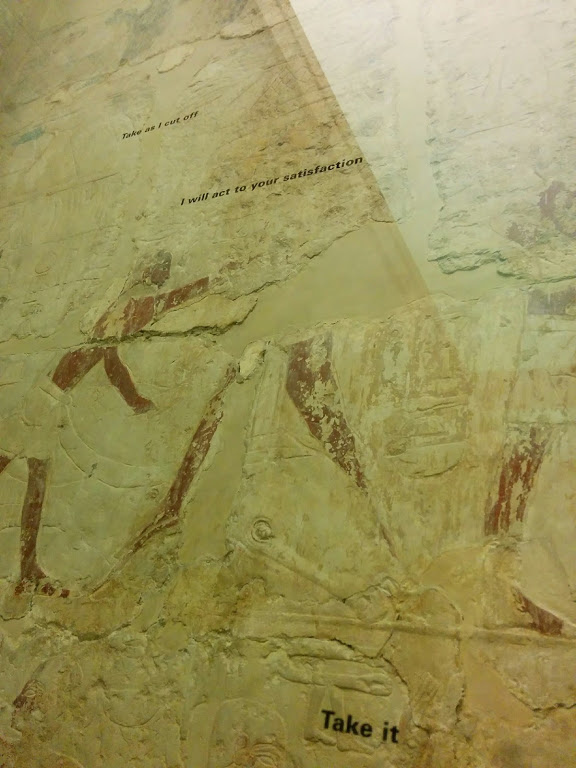
Section of wall from the tomb

The tomb consists of an underground burial chamber and a limestone mastaba above ground. The mastaba is divided into four rooms, including a decorated main offering chapel and a secondary offering chamber with a separate entrance. The secondary offering chamber is connected to the serdab (Arabic for "cellar"), a closed room containing a statue of Perneb, by a slot through which the smell of incense and chants could pass into the serdab. Perneb's burial shaft was located to the right side of the main offering chamber. The main offering chapel is decorated with a false door and painted reliefs which depict Perneb seated at an offering table where he offers food and other goods.

== Exhibit at the Metropolitan Museum of Art ==
The tomb was dismantled in 1913 by Albert Lythgoe and Ambrose Lansing, with the help of countless Egyptian workers. It was brought to the United States from Saqqara that year, where it was received and organized by Caroline Williams. It was reassembled at the MMA, in Gallery D4.

The tomb was opened to the public on 3 February 1916 to what Ransom called "great éclat." She wrote to her colleague James Breasted that "People were formed in line two abreast all the way back to the Fifth avenue entrance to get into the chambers. Glass positions electrically lighted illustrate the former position and the taking down of the tomb. There are two cases of the objects found in the course of the excavations including the greater part of Perneb’s skull. A model of the entire tomb makes clear the position of the burial chamber."

She wrote a handbook about the tomb, geared toward the general public and visitors to the exhibition, The Tomb of Perneb, with Illustrations.

In its original location, there were two small obelisks at the western corners of the courtyard, honoring the sun god Re. These are no longer part of the museum exhibit.

As of 2018, it is at the entrance to the museum's collection of Egyptian art. Visitors can enter the tomb and walk through its rooms. Some of the internal hieroglyphs have been translated into English.
