= William Tompkins =

William Tompkins may refer to:

- William F. Tompkins (New Jersey politician) (1913–1989), American attorney and member of the New Jersey General Assembly
- William F. Tompkins (United States Army officer) (1892–1969), American general
- William F. Tompkins (Wisconsin politician) (1812–1871), Wisconsin state legislator

== See also ==
- William Tomkins, English politician
