= Henry Sayler =

Henry Sayler may refer to:

- Henry B. Sayler (1836–1900), U.S. Representative from Indiana
- Henry Sayler (Florida politician) (1921–2021), American politician in the state of Florida.
- Henry Benton Sayler (1893–1970), United States Army general
