= Beukema =

Beukema is a Dutch surname. Notable people with the surname include:

- Herman Beukema (1891–1960), brigadier general in the United States Army
- Karel Beukema (1878–1908), Dutch diplomat and footballer
- Sam Beukema (born 1998), Dutch professional footballer
- Stefan Beukema, Dutch-Belgian chess player
