= Walter Hess =

Walter Hess may refer to:

- Walter Rudolf Hess (1881–1973), Swiss physiologist
- Walter W. Hess (1892–1972), United States Army brigadier general
- Wally Hess, American football running back
