= General Walton =

General Walton may refer to:

- Joseph Walton (British Army officer) (died 1808), British Army major general
- Leo A. Walton (1890–1961), U.S. Air Force major general
- William Lovelace Walton (1788–1865), British Army general

== See also ==
- Attorney General Walton (disambiguation)
