= John French Conklin =

American general (1891–1973)

John F. Conklin
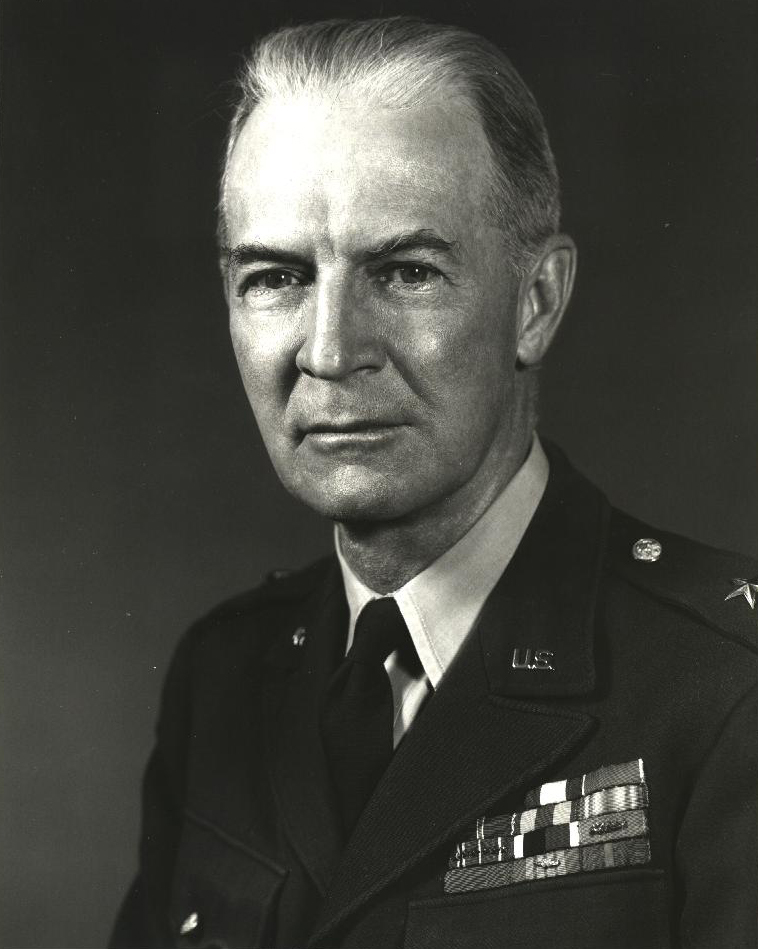
- Born: April 20, 1891; Fort Leavenworth, Kansas, U.S.
- Died: January 25, 1973 (aged 81); Washington, D.C., U.S.
- Military career
- Allegiance: United States of America
- Branch: United States Army
- Service years: 1915–1951
- Rank: Brigadier General
- Commands: Chief Engineer, Third U.S. Army
- Conflicts: Pancho Villa Expedition; World War I World War II: Operation Torch; Operation Overlord
- Awards: Distinguished Service Medal; Legion of Merit; Bronze Star Medal

John French Conklin (April 20, 1891 – January 25, 1973) was an American brigadier general, who served most of his career in the United States Army Corps of Engineers. During the World War II, Conklin served as Chief Engineer, Third U.S. Army.

== Early years ==
John French Conklin was born on April 20, 1891, at Fort Leavenworth, Kansas, as a son of Army Colonel, John Conklin and Rosalie French. He came from the family with a long military tradition, because his maternal grandfather was Union major general William H. French and also maternal uncle was major general John Clem. Young John followed his family tradition and upon completing of the high school in May 1911, he received an appointment to the United States Military Academy at West Point, New York.

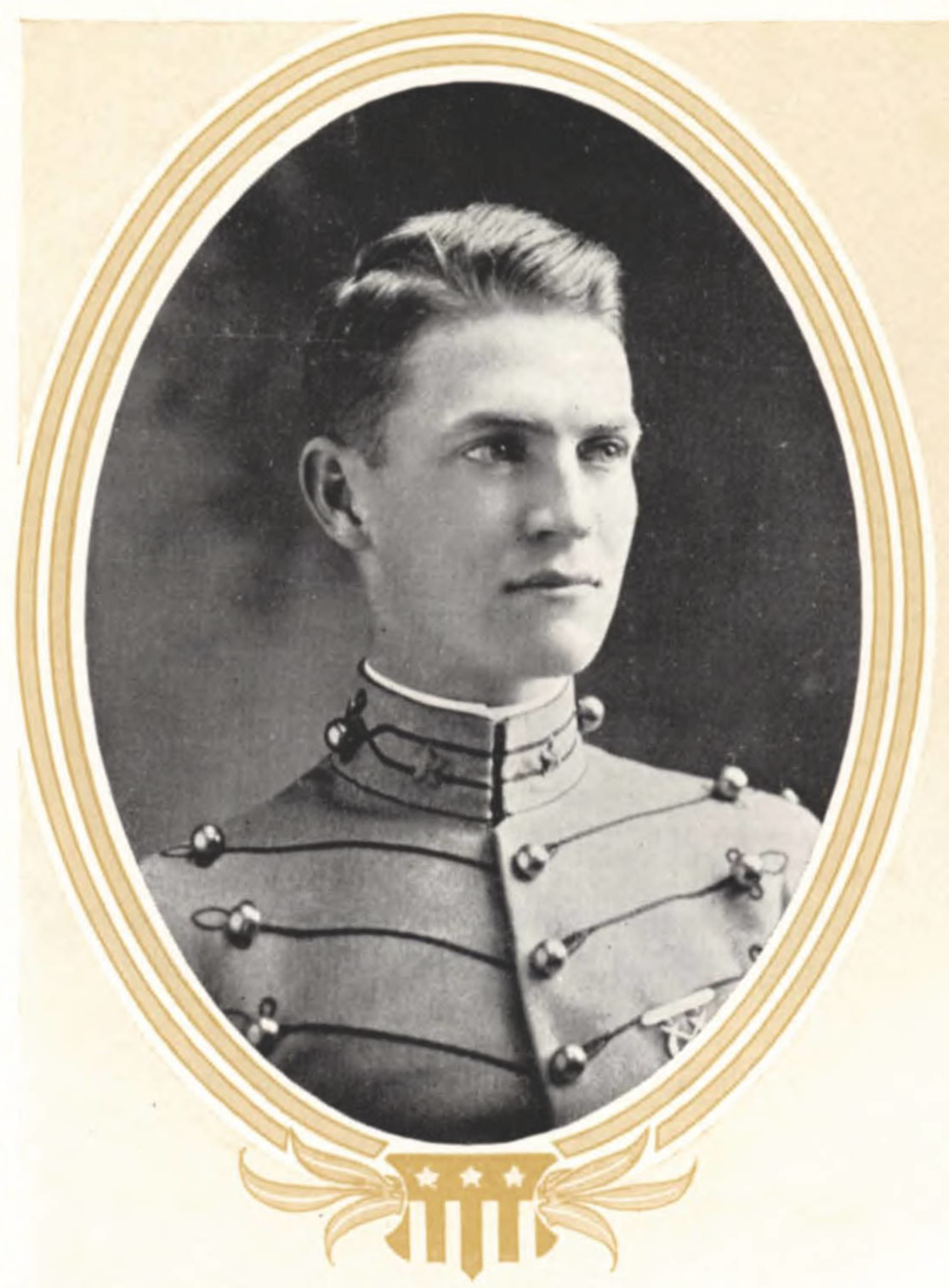
At West Point in 1915

During his time at the academy, he reached the rank of cadet lieutenant and also was an expert rifleman. Conklin graduated with Bachelor of Science degree on June 12, 1915, as a part of "the class the stars fell on", where many of his classmates became distinguished general officers later, including Dwight D. Eisenhower, Omar Bradley, Joseph T. McNarney, James Van Fleet, Henry Aurand, John W. Leonard, Joseph May Swing, Stafford LeRoy Irwin, Vernon Prichard, Vernon Evans, Charles W. Ryder, Albert W. Waldron, Paul J. Mueller, Leland Hobbs, Leroy H. Watson, Roscoe B. Woodruff and many others.

He was commissioned a second lieutenant in the Corps of Engineers on the date of his promotion and attached to the 2nd Battalion of Engineers, with whom he served on the Mexican Border during the Pancho Villa Expedition until April 1917. Shortly before his departure, Conklin married Marguerite Heard, a daughter of Major General John W. Heard, USMA Class of 1883 and Medal of Honor recipient.

He was subsequently appointed an instructor and assistant adjutant of the Officers Training Camp at Fort Myer, Virginia, and remained in that capacity for the duration of World War I.

== Interwar period ==
Following the World War I, Conklin completed the courses at Command and General Staff School at Fort Leavenworth, Kansas, in 1927 and at Army War College in Washington, D.C., in 1934 and served as an instructor in the Department of Civil and Military Engineering at the United States Military Academy at West Point in 1923–1924 and later as company commander with engineers units. During that period he reached the rank of major. Following his promotion, Conklin returned to West Point in 1931 and served as assistant professor in the Department of Natural and Experimental Philosophy mid-1934.

In July 1934, Conklin was appointed District Engineer, U.S. Engineers Office in Huntington, West Virginia, and remained in that capacity until he was attached to the 11th Engineer Regiment in July 1937. He was promoted to lieutenant colonel on April 1, 1936, and assumed command of the regiment at the end of September 1937. Conklin was then transferred to Norfolk, Virginia, where he served as District Engineer, U.S. Engineers Office until June 1941.

== World War II ==
Conklin was subsequently appointed corps engineer, I Armored Corps and was promoted to the rank of colonel in December 1941. He served in this capacity under famous general George S. Patton during desert maneuvers in Arizona and California in order to prepare the corps for deployment to North Africa. Conklin landed near Casablanca during the Operation Torch on November 8, 1942, and participated in the combat operations against Afrika Korps with additional duty as chief engineer, Western Task Force. He distinguished himself in that capacities and was decorated with the Legion of Merit by General Patton.

He was ordered back to the United States in January 1943 and assumed duty as army engineer, U.S. Third Army under Lieutenant General Courtney Hodges. Conklin sailed with Third Army to England in December of that year and when General Patton assumed command of the Army in January 1944, he remained in his previous capacity and took part in the intensive training until mid-1944.

Conklin sailed for France at the end of July 1944 and participated consecutively in the Battle of Normandy, Lorraine Campaign, Battle of the Bulge and the advance to Germany and Czechoslovakia. He was promoted to brigadier general on January 7, 1945, and received several decorations for his service in European Theater from 1944 to 1945. Conklin received the Army Distinguished Service Medal and Bronze Star Medal and also was decorated with Legion of Honor, rank Chevalier by the Government of France and with Belgian and French Croix de guerres with Palm.

== Postwar service ==
Following the occupation duty in Austria, Conklin returned to the United States in December 1945 and assumed duty as commanding general, Replacement Training Center at Fort Lewis, Washington. He remained in that capacity until March 1947, when he was appointed Chief of Personnel Division, Office of the Chief of Engineers under Lieutenant General Raymond A. Wheeler.

In mid-May 1949, Conklin was ordered to Japan and assumed duty as civil property custodian, Far East Command under General of the Army Douglas MacArthur. He served in that capacity until mid-1951, when he was ordered back to the United States and retired from active duty.

Brigadier General John F. Conklin died on January 25, 1973, at Sibley Memorial Hospital in Washington, D.C. He is buried at United States Military Academy Post Cemetery with his first wife, Marguerite Heard Conklin (1893–1929). They were married in April 1917 at Fort Bliss, Texas. She was the daughter of Brigadier General John W. Heard. They had one adopted son, John Heard Conklin who died in 1971, and three grandchildren.

After his first wife's death, Conklin married Helen DeWitt Duff in 1931. They lived in the Westmoreland Hills section of Bethesda, Maryland, after his retirement.

== Decorations ==
Here is Brigadier General Conklin's ribbon bar:

| 1st Row | Army Distinguished Service Medal | Legion of Merit | Bronze Star Medal | Army Commendation Medal |
| 2nd Row | Mexican Service Medal | World War I Victory Medal | American Defense Service Medal | American Campaign Medal |
| 3rd Row | European-African-Middle Eastern Campaign Medal with five service stars | World War II Victory Medal | Army of Occupation Medal | National Defense Service Medal |
| 4th Row | Chevalier of the Legion of Honor (France) | French Croix de guerre 1939-1945 with Palm | Belgian Croix de guerre 1940-1945 with Palm | Order of the Patriotic War First Class (USSR) |
