= Earl Larue Naiden =

American general (1894–1944)

Earl L. Naiden
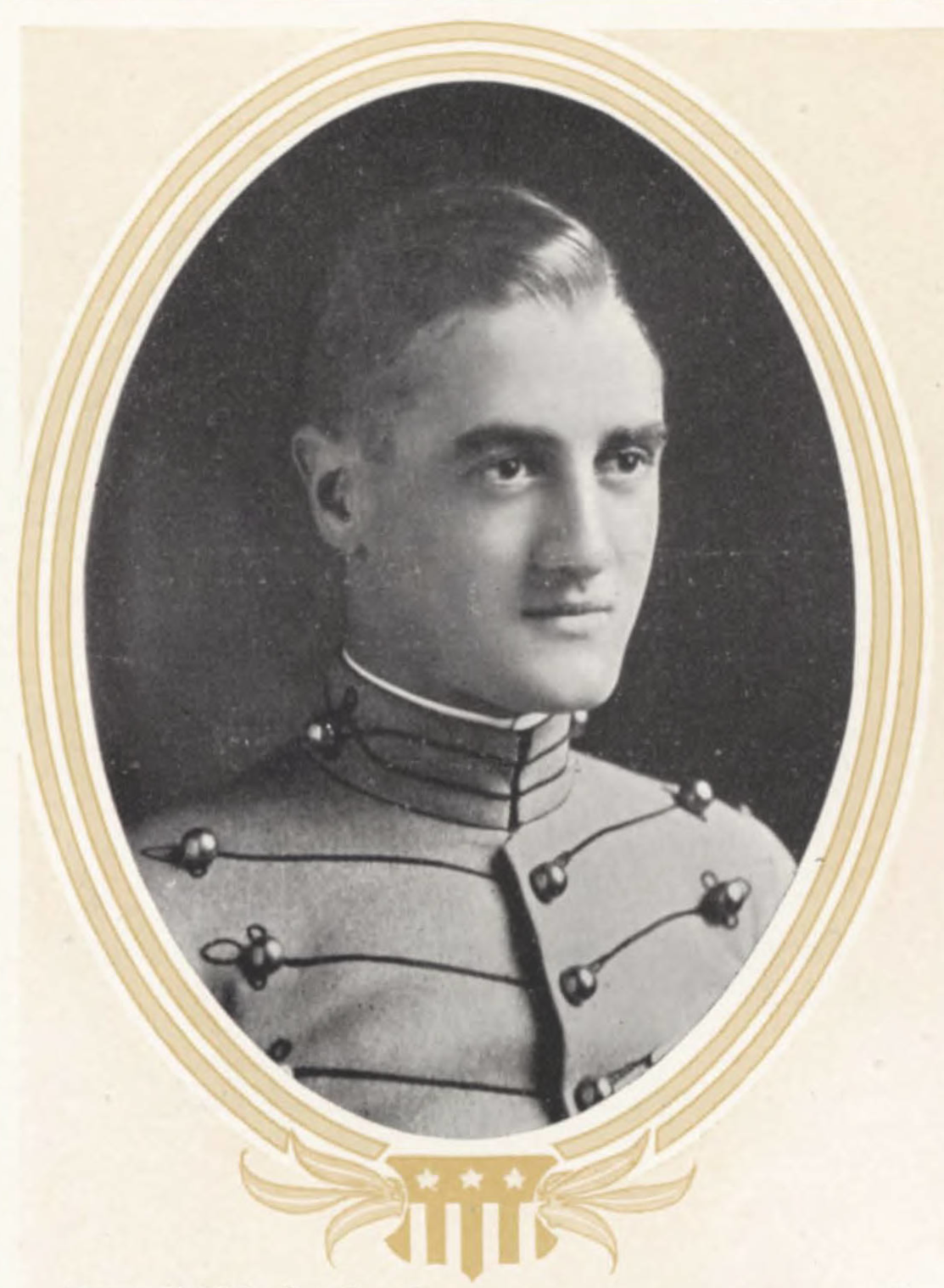
- General Earl Larue Naiden
- Born: 2 February 1894; Woodward, Iowa, United States
- Died: 20 September 1944 (aged 50); Redmond, Oregon, United States
- Education: United States Military Academy
- Military career
- Allegiance: United States
- Branch: United States Cavalry Corps
- Service years: 1915–1944
- Rank: Brigadier General
- Conflicts: World War I; World War II

Earl Larue Naiden (1894–1944) was an American career soldier and military officer.

== Biography ==
He was born in Woodward, Iowa, on February 2, 1894. He graduated from the U.S. Military Academy, West Point in 1915 (the class the stars fell on) and received the rank of second lieutenant of cavalry.

He participated in the Somme Defensive in March 1918. In July 1918, he was transferred to London, England, for duty with the Air Ministry. He was later transferred to France for flying duty in August 1918, taking part in the St. Mihiel Offensive on September 12, 1918, and in the Meuse-Argonne from September 26 to November 1, 1918.

Upon his return to the United States, he became an instructor at the Army War College, Washington, D.C., between August 1929, and August 1933. He later moved to Fort Crockett, Texas, for flying duty, and became the commanding officer of the 3d Attack Group and part of the time served as the commanding officer of the post. In March 1935, he moved to Barksdale Field, Louisiana, in the same role, becoming wing executive officer at this station in July 1937.

He died on September 20, 1944, in the crash of a C-45 transport airplane near Redmond, Oregon.

== Dates of ranks ==
The progression of his ranks and promotions is provided below.

- 1935-03-02 Lieutenant-colonel (temporary)
- 1936-07-13 Lieutenant-colonel
- 1940-03-01 Colonel (temporary)
- 1941-06-26 Colonel (Army of the United States)
- 1942-01-23 Brigadier-general (Army of the United States)
- 1942-11-06 Termination of rank brigadier-general (Army of the United States)

== Awards and honours ==
He has received a number of awards, including but not limited to the Legion of Merit, Purple Heart, Mexican Service Medal, World War I Victory Medal, American Defense Service Medal, American Campaign Medal, Asiatic–Pacific Campaign Medal, World War II Victory Medal, the French Ordre de l’Étoile Noire (Officer).
