= James A. Lester =

- Allegiance: United States
- Branch: United States Army
- Service years: 1915–1953
- Rank: Major General
- Conflicts: World War I World War II

James Allen Lester (October 13, 1891 - March 10, 1958) was a senior United States Army officer.

He was a member of the West Point class of 1915.

He was part of the commission that tried Tomoyuki Yamashita.

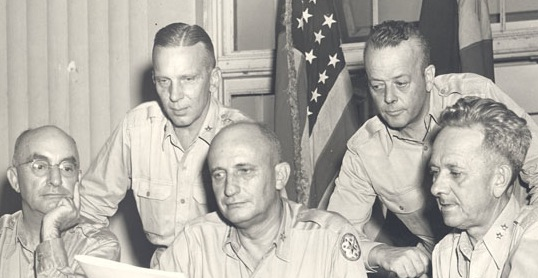
The Yamashita Trial Commission. From left to right: Major General Leo Donovan, Brigadier General Morris C. Harwerk, Major General Russel B. Reynolds, Brigadier General Egbert F. Bullens, and Major General James A. Lester
