= The class the stars fell on =

United States Military Academy class of 1915

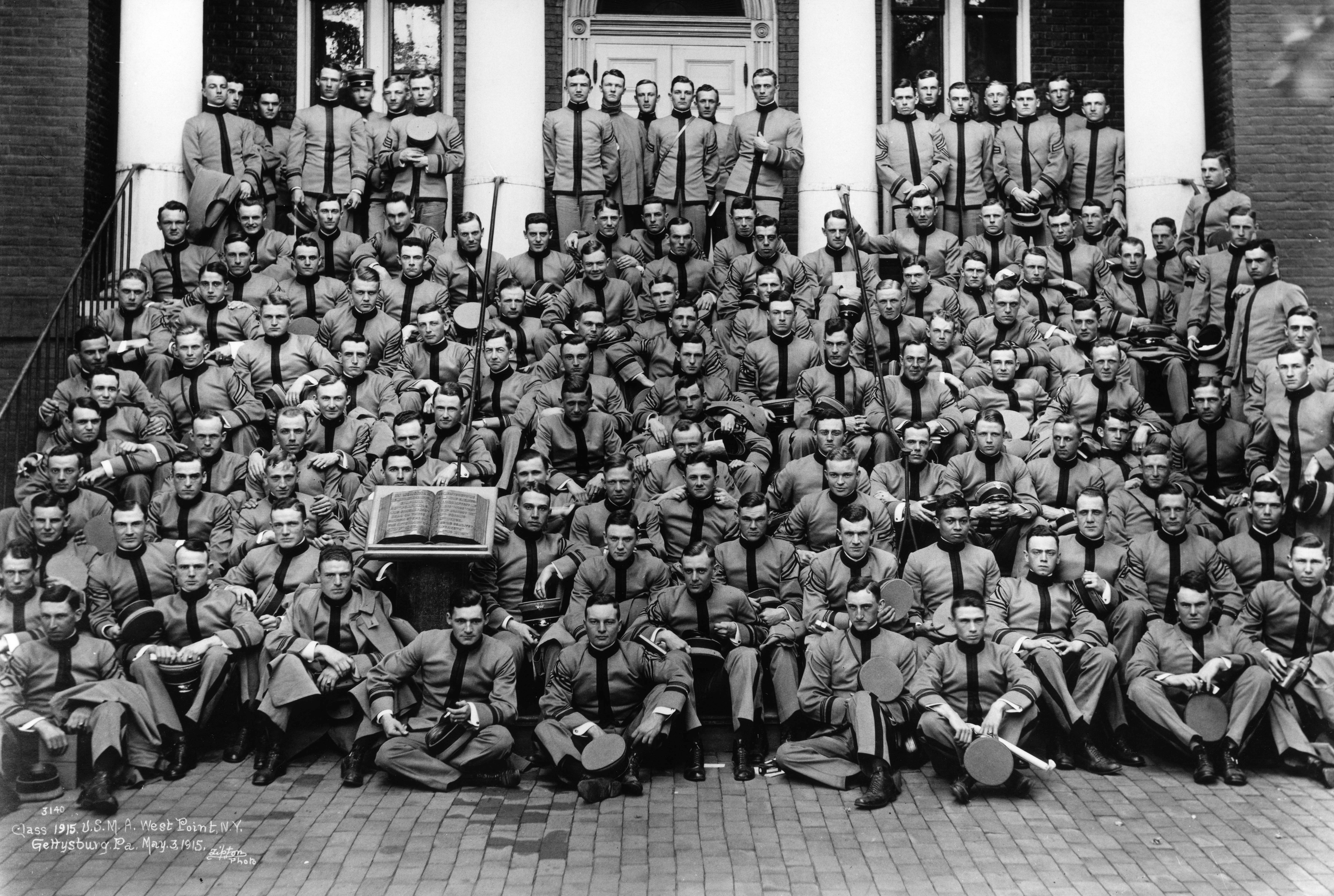
Members of the West Point class of 1915

"The class the stars fell on" is an expression used to describe the class of 1915 at the United States Military Academy in West Point, New York. In the United States Army, the insignia reserved for generals is one or more stars. Of the 164 graduates that year, 59 (36%) attained general officer rank, more than any other class in the history of the academy (due in large part to the timing of World War II), hence the expression.

Two graduates reached the rank of five-star General of the Army, two became four-star generals, seven three-star lieutenant generals, 24 two-star major generals, and 24 one-star brigadier generals. Dwight D. Eisenhower, one of the five-star generals, went on to become the 34th President of the United States. The other, Omar Bradley, became the first Chairman of the Joint Chiefs of Staff, under Presidents Harry S. Truman and Eisenhower.

The term had previously been applied to the class of 1886, which, due to World War I, produced a large number of general officers. Of this class, which includes John J. Pershing, Charles T. Menoher, and Mason Patrick, 25 out of 77 (32%) became generals.

== About the class ==
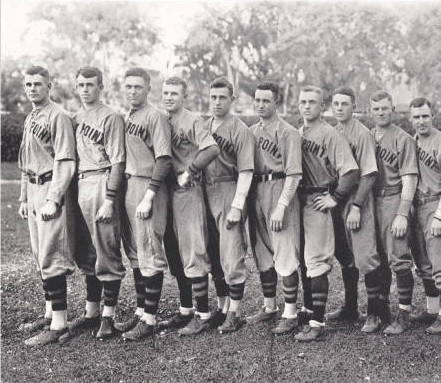
The 1914 West Point baseball team. Omar Bradley is second from left. Every member of the team who remained in the Army became a general.

Some 287 cadets entered the United States Military Academy at West Point, New York, in 1911, the largest plebe (entering or most junior) class up to that date. That year, the United States Congress changed the rules regarding appointment to the Academy. Previously, Congressmen had been allowed to make one appointment every four years. This was now increased to one every three years.

Fourteen more cadets received appointments to the class, which they joined six weeks late, in August 1911, thereby missing out on the infamous period of hazing known as Beast Barracks. They were known as the "Augustines" after the month on which they joined. Among their number was Omar Bradley.

Only 164 cadets graduated and were commissioned as second lieutenants on 12 June 1915, but that was still the largest graduating class up to that time. The Army had 105 positions available for them.

The class First Captain (the cadet brigade commander) was Roscoe B. Woodruff. The top 19 graduates all went into the United States Army Corps of Engineers. Ranking first in the class was William E. R. Covell, who edged out Edwin R. Kimble by the narrowest of margins. Covell went on to become a general during World War II. Kimble served during World War I as a major in France, where he died on 9 April 1918 of sepsis after a surgical operation. The youngest graduating member of the class was Clyde R. Eisenschmidt, who was born on 30 July 1894. He retired as a lieutenant colonel on 30 June 1940.

The oldest member of the class was Robert B. Lorch, who was born on 18 December 1888. After serving in France as a major during World War I, he was honorably discharged from the Army on 8 December 1922. Recalled during World War II, he reached the rank of lieutenant colonel in 1950. In a class with many superb athletes, Thomas B. Larkin won the physical fitness contest and was designated "strong man" of the Corps.

The lowest ranking member of the class, known as the class "goat", was Charles C. Herrick. After service in France as a major, he was honorably discharged on 15 December 1922, and became an investment banker. Recalled to active duty during World War II, he reached the rank of colonel. Among the class was Luis R. Esteves, the first Puerto Rican to attend West Point, and the first to graduate. He was the first member of the class to be made a general.

Sixteen members of the class were sons of West Point graduates. Three were both sons and grandsons of graduates. Alexander P. Cronkhite was the son of Major General Adelbert Cronkhite, from the class of 1882, and the grandson of Brigadier General Alexander C. M. Pennington, Jr., of the class of 1860. Ranked 7th in the class, Cronkhite died in a mysterious shooting accident on 25 October 1918. John F. Conklin was the son of Colonel John Conklin of the class of 1884. His maternal grandfather was Major General William H. French of the class of 1837. Oscar Straub was the son of Colonel Oscar I. Straub of the class of 1887, and the grandson of Brigadier General E. Van A. Andruss, from the class of 1864. John R. Mendenhall's father John Ross Mendenhall had attended the Academy but dropped out in 1881 without graduating, and his grandfather, Colonel John Mendenhall, was a graduate of the class of 1851. Pearson Menoher was the son of Major General Charles T. Menoher, who was a member of the class of 1886, and, after commanding the 42nd "Rainbow" Division in France during World War I, served as the first chief of the United States Army Air Service.

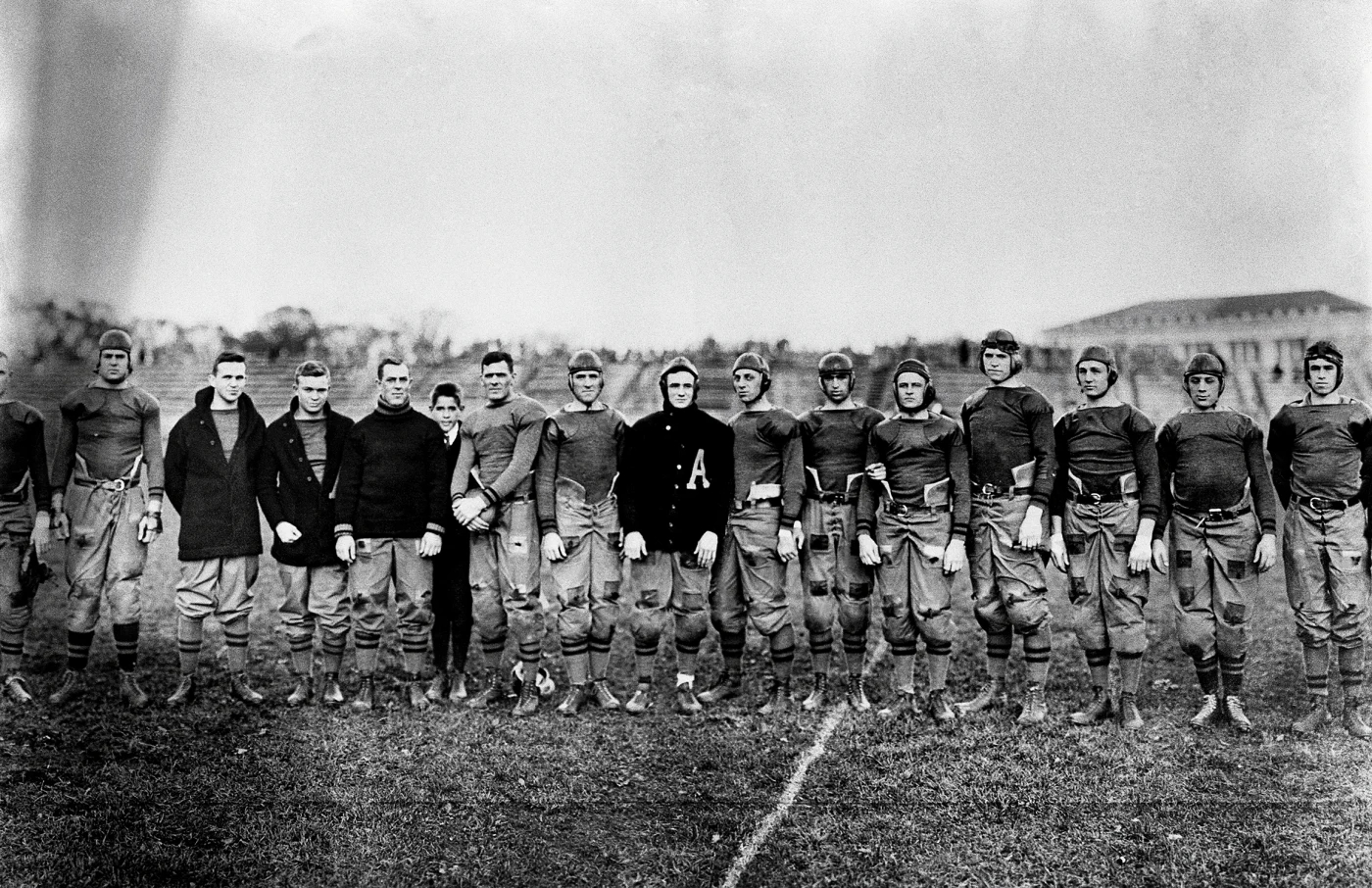
The 1912 West Point football team. Dwight D. Eisenhower is third from left. Louis Merillat is eighth from the left, in the A sweater. Omar Bradley is on the far right, to the left of Leland Hobbs.

The others were:

- Donald A. Davison, son of Lorenzo P. Davison of the class of 1885
- Vernon Evans, son of Lieutenant Colonel William Pierce Evans from the class of 1878
- Douglas H. Gillette, son of Major Cassius E. Gillette from the class of 1884
- Sydney Graves, son of Major General William S. Graves from the class of 1889
- Blackburn Hall, son of Brigadier General William Preble Hall, a Medal of Honor recipient from the class of 1868
- Hubert R. Harmon, son of Colonel Millard F. Harmon Sr. of the class of 1880
- Stafford LeRoy Irwin, son of Graves's classmate Major General George LeRoy Irwin from the class of 1889
- Henry McE. Pendleton, son of Colonel Edwin P. Pendleton of the class of 1879
- John E. Rossell, son of Pendleton's classmate Colonel William T. Rossell

Harmon was preceded by his two older brothers, Kenneth B. Harmon, of the class of 1910, and Millard F. Harmon, Jr., of the class of 1912. Hubert Harmon was ejected when it was discovered that he had two brothers at West Point, as it was felt that the taxpayers would not be getting their money's worth educating three sons of the same family. He was readmitted in June 1911 after his father lobbied numerous government officials. He now only had one brother at West Point, as Kenneth had graduated the year before. Both Millard Jr., and Hubert later became three-star generals.

Due to its origins as an engineering school, the West Point curriculum emphasized mathematics and other technical subjects of relevance to that specialty rather than education in military topics. Much of the military training that was provided concerned close order drill and equitation. Of the top 25 graduates of the class of 1915, 24 were commissioned into the Corps of Engineers. The exception, James A. Lester, who was ranked 23rd, chose to go into the field artillery instead. He became a major general.

== Careers ==
Of the 164 graduates in the class, 102 (62 percent) served overseas during World War I before the armistice of 11 November 1918, and 56 (34 percent) saw actual combat. This was not unusual. Nearly 60 percent of the Army's regular officers did not serve overseas. A widespread belief that those who had served overseas would receive preferential treatment, including faster promotion, was not borne out by subsequent events.

Promotion was by seniority, and glacially slow. Officers commissioned between November 1916 and November 1918 made up 55.4 percent of the Army's officers in 1926. This "hump" constituted a major personnel problem that was solved only by the Army's rapid expansion after 1940 in response to World War II. Much of the success of the class is attributable to being fortunate enough to be just ahead of the hump, but not too old to assume positions of great responsibility during World War II.

Omar Bradley, for example, was promoted to first lieutenant on 1 July 1916, captain on 15 May 1917, and major on 17 June 1918. He had been returned to the grade of captain on 22 January 1920, and promoted to major again on 1 July 1920, only to be returned to captain again on 4 November 1922. He was promoted to major a third time on 25 June 1924, and remained one for twelve years before becoming a lieutenant colonel on 26 June 1936. He was promoted to brigadier general in February 1941.

In the inter-war period, officers led a "country club existence". They had a high social standing, equivalent to that of an upper-middle-class professional. They normally worked a 30-hour week, which gave them plenty of time to spend with their families, and for sports. They and their families had access to free medical and dental care. They had free life insurance, and an adequate salary, which could be stretched because Army commissaries and post exchanges sold many everyday goods tax-free. They invariably lived on-base in good housing, and in tight-knit and supportive communities. When posted overseas, they took their families with them. A secure and steady job was highly prized during the Great Depression years from 1929 to 1939, and resignations were rare.

There were two levels of advanced schooling. The first was the Command and General Staff School at Fort Leavenworth, which concentrated on teaching officers both command and staff duties related to corps and divisions. Although viewed as competitive, nearly all officers eventually attended. A 1937 survey showed that 97 percent of the Army's colonels and 95 percent of its lieutenant colonels were graduates. There were two senior schools, the Army War College and the Army Industrial College. The Army War College taught the handling of higher formations. The Army Industrial College taught industrial mobilization.

The Army's training program attracted criticism, both at the time and subsequently. In 1937, Brigadier General George C. Marshall felt that in merging instruction on command and staff duties, the Command and General Staff School had neglected the former in favor of the latter, with officers being prepared for staff duties in peacetime rather than the chaos of command in wartime. Brigadier General Lesley J. McNair conducted a survey of graduates in 1939 that found that most felt that there was too much emphasis on obsolete skills like equitation. For this reason, the staff rides were disliked. While most considered the map exercises the most valuable part of the curriculum, some noted that students spent time discovering for themselves things that they could have been told.

Writing in 2011, Jörg Muth concluded that "At Fort Leavenworth, school solutions were always the norm. Ineffective courses were led by instructors who sometimes lacked knowledge of their fields and usually failed in didactics and pedagogics ... It seems in general not to have been a good idea to challenge the instructors at Leavenworth in any way if an officer student wanted to leave the school with a respectable grade." While the education system undoubtedly failed in some key areas, it did create a body of competent division and corps commanders.

The first member of the class to wear a star was Esteves, who was appointed adjutant general of Puerto Rico with the rank of brigadier general in February 1939. During World War II, Eisenhower and Bradley rose to four-star rank. They made decisions that dramatically affected the careers of their classmates. Concerned that Major General Roscoe Woodruff, whose VII Corps was scheduled to spearhead the Normandy landings, had no amphibious experience, Bradley replaced him with Major General J. Lawton Collins. Woodruff returned to the United States. He later distinguished himself in command of the 24th Infantry Division in amphibious operations in the Philippines campaign.

A worse fate befell Major General Henry J. F. Miller, who leaked details of the invasion date at a dinner party in April 1944. He was reduced to his permanent rank of lieutenant colonel and sent home. Eisenhower wrote a letter to him explaining that, "I know of nothing that causes me more real distress than to be faced with the necessity of sitting as a judge in cases involving military offences by officers of character and good record, particularly when they are old and warm friends." Miller retired due to physical disability on 30 November 1944. In December 1948 he was promoted to brigadier general on the retired list. He died on 7 January 1949.

Apart from those who became generals, the best known member of the class is Louis A. Merrilat, who played college football with the Army Black Knights alongside Bradley and Eisenhower, and was selected as a first-team All-American in both 1913 and 1914. He was wounded in battle while serving in France during World War I. He later played in the National Football League for the Canton Bulldogs in the 1925 NFL season. He became a soldier of fortune, training Iran's Persian Guard, working with the Chinese Army in the 1930s, and serving in the French Foreign Legion. During World War II, he returned to active duty with the US Army, reaching the rank of colonel.

The last surviving general of the class was James Van Fleet, who commanded the 4th Infantry Division, 90th Infantry Division and III Corps during World War II, and the U.S. Eighth Army in the Korean War. Celebrations for his 100th birthday on 19 March 1992 included a parachute drop by the Army's Golden Knights. A West Point Cadet, James Ward, remarked that: "Everything we aspire to be, he's already done. He's the epitome of the Long Gray Line." Van Fleet died on 23 September 1992, at the age of 100.

The last surviving member of the class was Edmund De Treville Ellis. Commissioned in the cavalry, he later transferred to the Quartermaster Corps, with which he served in the European Theater during World War II and during the 1948 Berlin airlift. He retired from the Army as a colonel on 31 March 1950. He became the oldest living graduate of West Point in October 1990, and the last surviving member of the class of 1915 on the death of Van Fleet. He died at the age of 104 on 22 January 1995. Like Van Fleet, he was interred in Arlington National Cemetery.

== Generals of the Class of 1915 ==
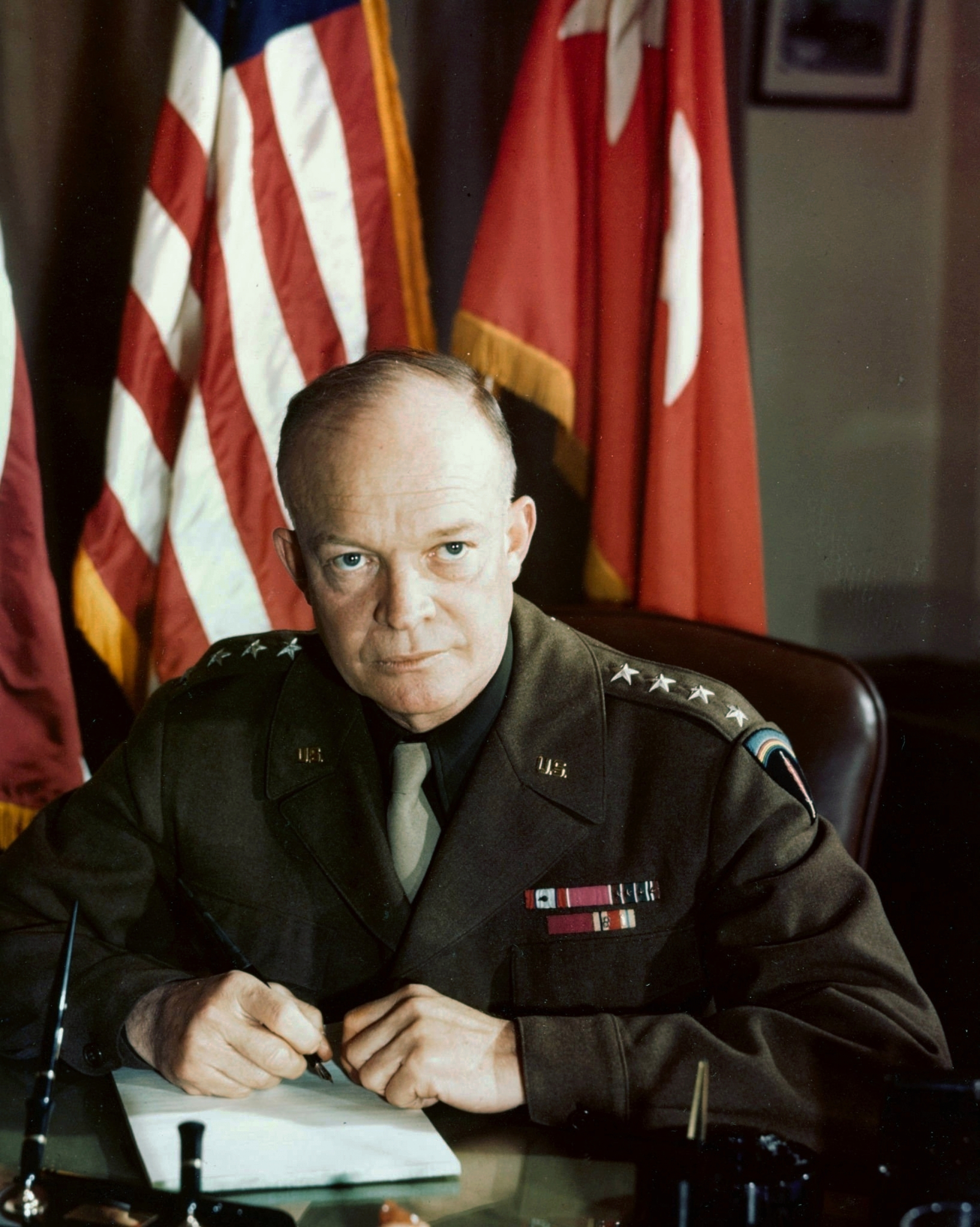
General of the Army Dwight D. Eisenhower (as a general)

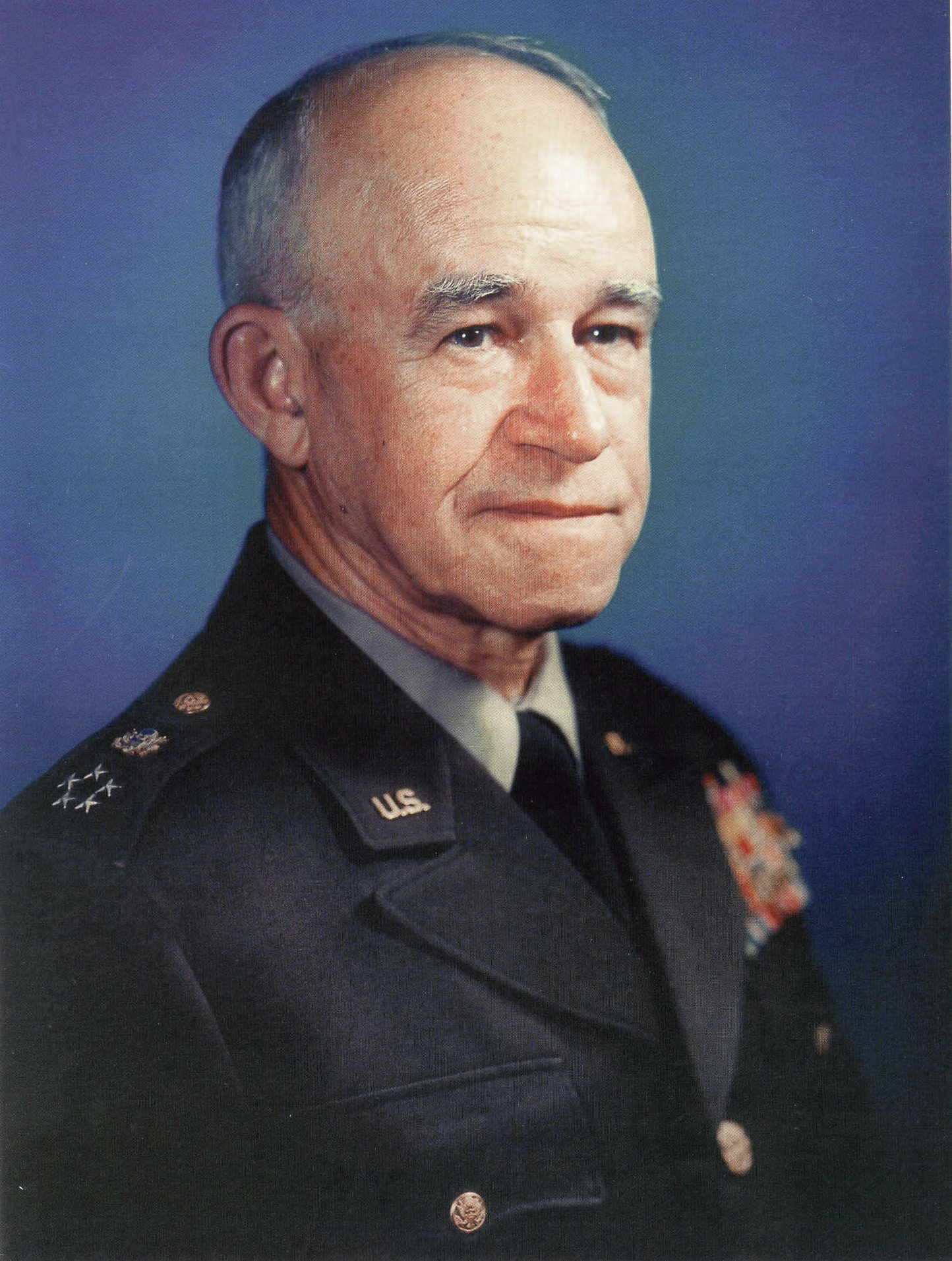
General of the Army Omar N. Bradley

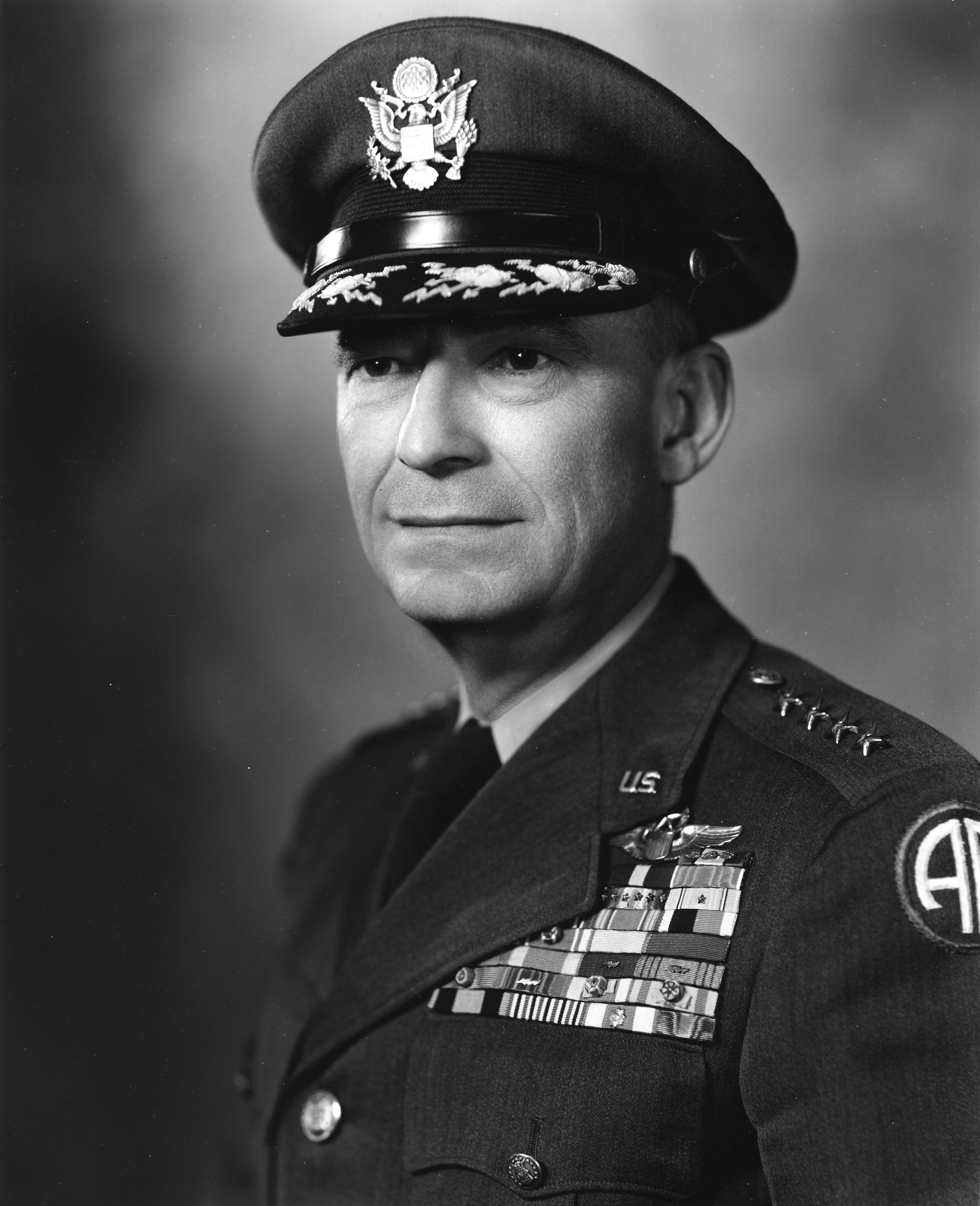
General Joseph T. McNarney

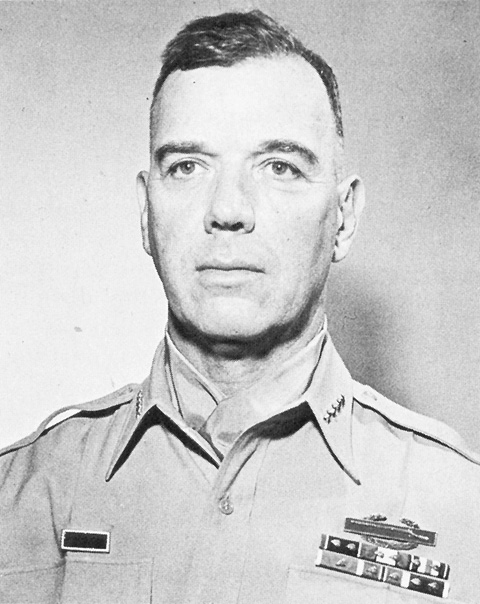
General James Van Fleet

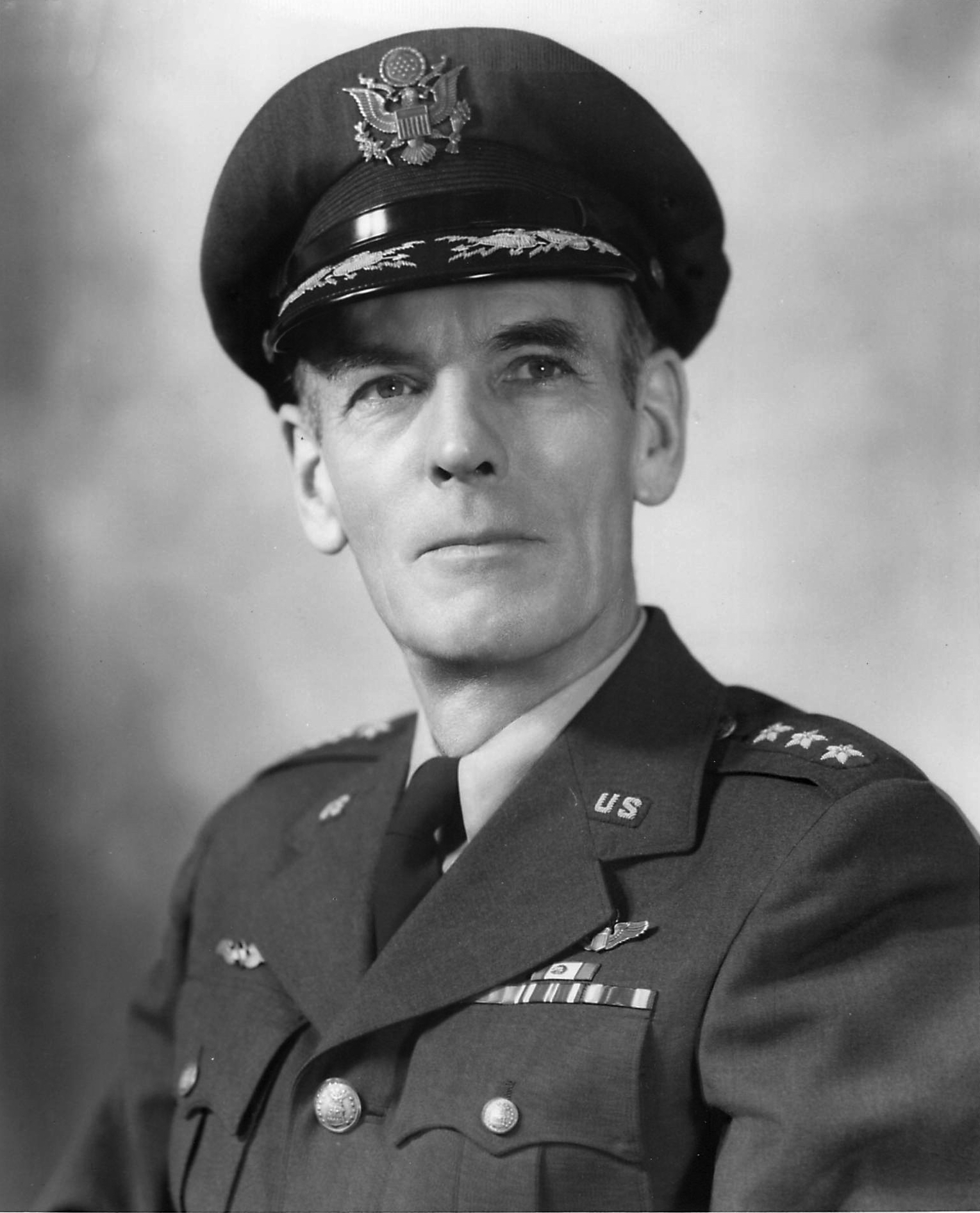
Lieutenant General Hubert R. Harmon

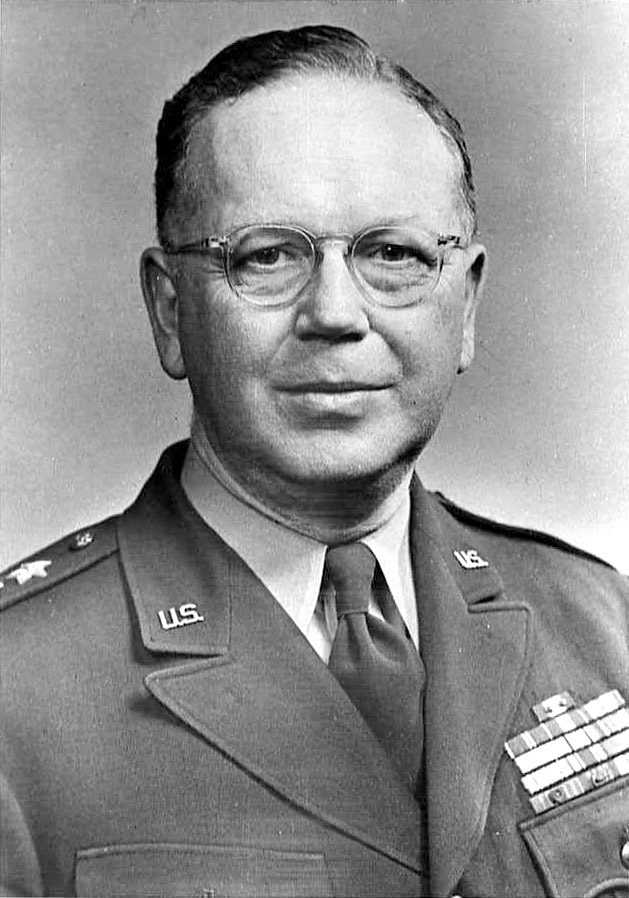
Lieutenant General Henry S. Aurand

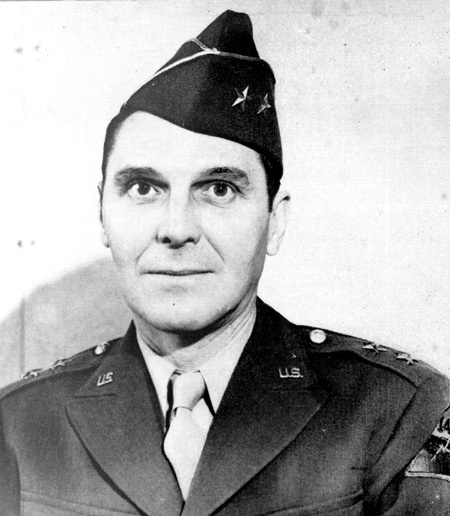
Major General Vernon Prichard

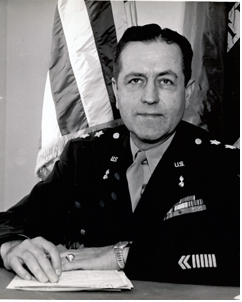
Major General Henry B. Sayler

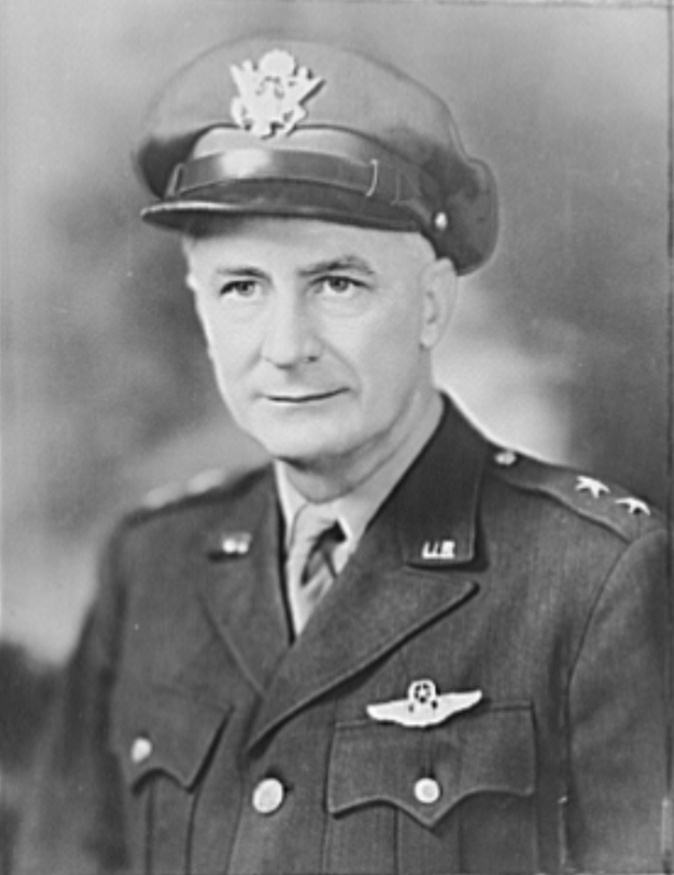
Major General Henry J. F. Miller

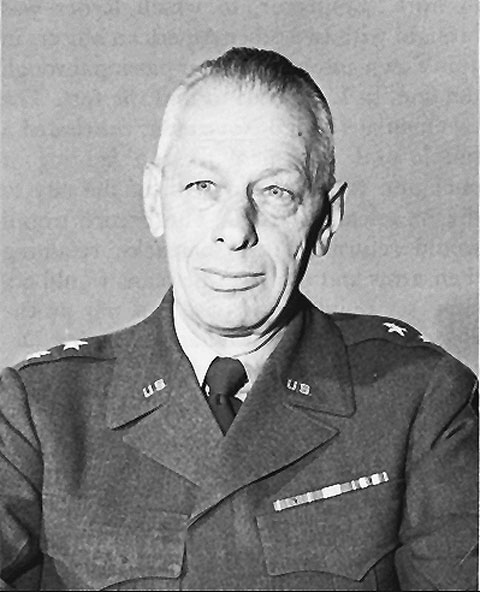
Major General Charles W. Ryder

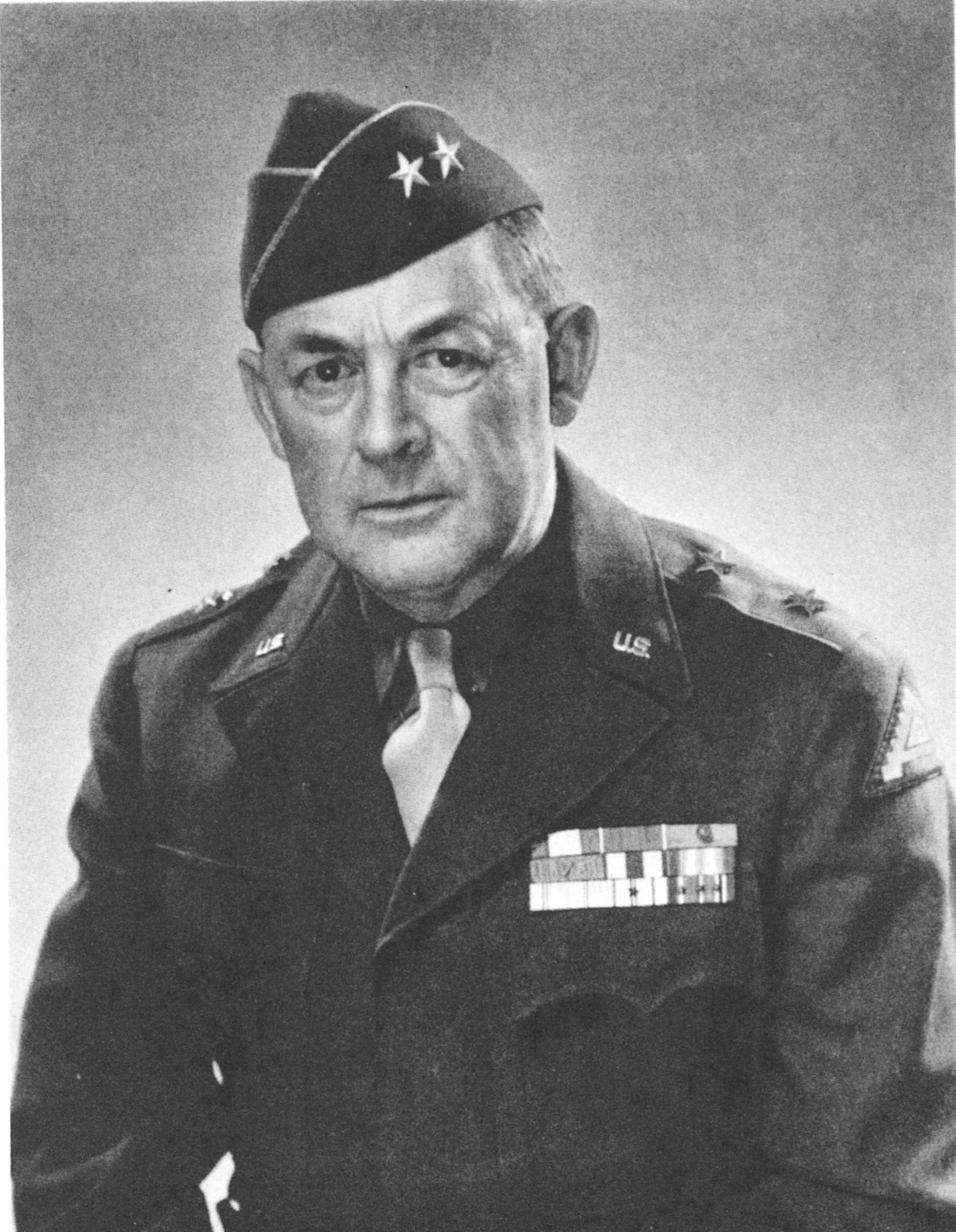
Major General A. Arnim White

Rank	Name	Rank in class	Notes	Ref.
General of the Army	Omar N. Bradley	44	Commanded 82nd Infantry Division (1942), 28th Infantry Division (1942), II Corps (1943), First Army (1944), Twelfth Army Group (1944–1945); served as Chief of Staff of the United States Army (1948–1949), Chairman of the Joint Chiefs of Staff (1949–1953)	
General of the Army	Dwight D. Eisenhower	61	Supreme Allied Commander, North African Theater of Operations (1942–1943), Supreme Allied Commander Europe (1942, 1943–1945, 1949–1952), Chief of Staff of the United States Army (1945–1948), President of the United States (1953–1961)	
General	Joseph T. McNarney	41	Deputy Chief of Staff, U.S. Army (1942–1944), Supreme Allied Commander, Mediterranean Theater of Operations (1944–1945), commanded U.S. Forces in Europe (1945–1947), commanded Air Materiel Command (1947-1949)	
General	James Van Fleet	92	Commanded 4th Infantry Division, 90th Infantry Division, III Corps in World War II; U.S. Eighth Army in the Korean War (1951–1953)	
Lieutenant General	Henry Aurand	20	Commanded 6th Service Command (1942–1944), Deputy Chief Ordnance Officer, European Theater of Operations (1944), commanded Normandy Base Section (1944–1945), Services of Supply China Theater (1945), U.S. Army Pacific (1949)	
Lieutenant General	Hubert R. Harmon	103	Commanded Sixth Air Force (1942–1943, 1946–1947), Thirteenth Air Force (1943–1944), Superintendent of the United States Air Force Academy (1954–1956)	
Lieutenant General	Stafford LeRoy Irwin	40	Commanded 5th Infantry Division, XII Corps, V Corps, U.S. Forces Austria (1950–1952)	
Lieutenant General	Thomas B. Larkin	21	Chief of Staff, Services of Supply, U.S. Army Forces, British Isles (1942–1943); Commanded Services of Supply, North African Theater of Operations (1943), Communications Zone, North African Theater of Operations (1943–1944), Southern Line of Communications, Communications Zone, European Theater of Operations (1944–1945), 2nd Service Command (1945); Quartermaster General of the U.S. Army (1946–1949), Deputy Chief of Staff for Logistics (1949–1952)	
Lieutenant General	John W. Leonard	84	Commanded 9th Armored Division (1942–1945), U.S. Army Armor School (1946–1948), V Corps and XVIII Airborne Corps (1951–1953)	
Lieutenant General	George E. Stratemeyer	147	Commanded Army Air Forces China-Burma-India Theater of Operations (1943–1946), Air Defense Command (1946–1948), Continental Air Command (1948–1949), Far East Air Forces (1949–1952)	
Lieutenant General	Joseph M. Swing	38	Commanded 11th Airborne Division (1943–1948), I Corps (1948–1949), Sixth Army (1951–1954)	
Major General	John Stewart Bragdon	5	Assistant Chief of Military Construction (1945–1949); Deputy Chief of Engineers (1950–1951)	
Major General	Ralph P. Cousins	129	Commanded Army Air Force Western Flying Training Command (1942–1946)	
Major General	William E. R. Covell	1	Director of Fuels and Lubricants, Office of Quartermaster General (1943–1944); Commanded Services of Supply China-Burma-India Theater (1944–1945)	
Major General	Luis R. Esteves	97	Adjutant General of Puerto Rico (1939–1957)	
Major General	Vernon Evans	55	Deputy Chief of Staff and Chief of Staff China-Burma-India Theater (1944–1945)	
Major General	Thomas J. Hanley Jr.	124	Commanded Air Service Command, Army Air Forces China-Burma-India Theater (1944–1945), Eleventh Air Force (1946–1948)	
Major General	Thomas G. Hearn	106	Chief of Staff China-Burma-India Theater (1944); Commanded Infantry Replacement Training Center (1944–1945)	
Major General	Leland S. Hobbs	46	Commanded 30th Infantry Division (1942–1945), 2nd Armored Division (1946–1947), IX Corps (1949–1950)	
Major General	James A. Lester	23	Commanded 24th Division Artillery, XIV Corps Artillery, 24th Infantry Division	
Major General	Edwin B. Lyon	48	Commanded VI Bomber Command (1941–1943), Antilles Air Command (1943); Deputy Commander, Army Air Force Flying Training Command (1944–1945); Commanded Air Forces Mid Pacific (1945–1946)	
Major General	Henry J. F. Miller	110	Commanded Air Material Command European Theater of Operations (1943–1944). Reduced in rank to lieutenant colonel in May 1944 as the result of a security breach. Retired for disability in November 1944. Promoted to brigadier general on the retired list in 1948.	
Major General	Paul J. Mueller	45	Commanded 81st Infantry Division (1942–1946)	
Major General	Vernon Prichard	134	Commanded 14th Armored Division (1942–1944), 1st Armored Division (1944–1945)	
Major General	George J. Richards	6	War Department General Staff (1943–1947)	
Major General	Charles W. Ryder	39	Commanded 34th Infantry Division (1942–1944), IX Corps (1944–1948)	
Major General	Henry B. Sayler	37	Chief Ordnance Officer, European Theater of Operations (1942–1945)	
Major General	William F. Tompkins	16	War Department General Staff (1943–1945)	
Major General	Albert W. Waldron	32	Field Artillery Representative, Army Ground Forces (1943–1946)	
Major General	Leo A. Walton	128	Air Inspector Army Air Force China Theater (1945–1946); Commanded Fourteenth Air Force (1946–1948)	
Major General	Leroy H. Watson	151	Commanded 3rd Armored Division (1943–1944), 79th Infantry Division (1945). Commands before 1953 retirement included: International Military Tribunal Command, Germany; Southern District, Sixth United States Army; Fort Lewis; Chief of Civil Affairs, U. S. Far East Command; and U.S. Defense Advisory Group, Japan.	
Major General	Douglas L. Weart	10	Chief of Staff, Caribbean Defense Command (1943–1944); Deputy commander China Theater (1945)	
Major General	A. Arnim White	158	Chief of Staff, U.S. Seventh Army (1944–1945); Commanded 75th Infantry Division and 71st Infantry Division (1945–1946)	
Major General	John B. Wogan	75	Commanded 13th Armored Division (1942–1945)	
Major General	Roscoe B. Woodruff	56	Commanded 77th Infantry Division (1942–1943), VII Corps (1943–1944), 24th Infantry Division (1944–1945), I Corps (1945–1948), XV Corps (1951–1953)	
Brigadier General	Herman Beukema	26	Director of Army Specialized Training Program	
Brigadier General	Carl C. Bank	53	Artillery Officer Allied Forces Headquarters, North African Theater of Operations (1942–44); Commanded 13th Field Artillery Brigade (1944–1945)	
Brigadier General	Frederic W. Boye	150	Served in China (1944–1945)	
Brigadier General	Charles M. Busbee	31	Commanded 102nd Division Artillery (1942–1946)	
Brigadier General	John F. Conklin	13	Engineer with Third Army (1942–1945)	
Brigadier General	John F. Davis	99	Chief of Staff 6th Service Command (1942–1944); Director of Information and Education, War Department (1944–1945)	
Brigadier General	Michael F. Davis	96	Commanded 78th Flying Training Wing (1944–1945), Army Air Force Central Flying Training Command (1945–1946)	
Brigadier General	Donald A. Davison	19	Aviation Engineers (1942–1944). Died Bangalore, India 6 May 1944. Davison Army Airfield is named after him.	
Brigadier General	Benjamin G. Ferris	104	Deputy Chief of Staff, China-Burma-India Theater (1943–1944)	
Brigadier General	Adlai H. Gilkeson	137	Commanded Air Defenses, Panama Canal Zone (1942), III Fighter Command (1944), 312th Fighter Wing (1944–1945)	
Brigadier General	Walter W. Hess	95	Commanded 1st Antiaircraft Command (1941–1942), 45th Coast Artillery Brigade (1942), commanding officer of artillery, 36th Infantry Division (1943–1945), Anti-aircraft Replacement Training Center (1944–1945)	
Brigadier General	Clinton Wilbur Howard	30	Chief of Staff Third Air Force (1941–1942), Army Air Force Technical Training Command (1942–1943), Sacramento Air Service Command (1943–1945)	
Brigadier General	Reese M. Howell	109	Commanded 4th, 17th, and 13th Field Artillery Brigades (1940–1944); Assistant Division Commander 82nd Airborne Division (1944); Commanded 9th Infantry Division Artillery (1944–1946)	
Brigadier General	John Keliher	159	Deputy Chief of Staff (G-3) U.S. Army Forces Mid Pacific (1942–1944); Deputy Chief of Staff (G-5) U.S. Army Forces Mid Pacific (1944–1945)	
Brigadier General	Pearson Menoher	42	Chief of Staff XV Corps and Seventh Army (1943–1945); Commanded 24th Infantry Division in the Korean War (1949–1950)	
Brigadier General	Lehman W. Miller	9	Chief of Military Mission to Brazil (1940–1942); Commanded Engineer Replacement Training Center, Fort Belvoir (1942–1944)	
Brigadier General	Earl L. Naiden	68	Chief of Staff, Ferry Command, China-Burma-India Theater of Operations (1942); Chief of Staff Tenth Air Force (1942)	
Brigadier General	Hume Peabody	63	Commandant Army Air Forces School of Applied Tactics (1942–1944); Commanded III Tactical Air Command (1942–1944)	
Brigadier General	Norman Randolph	145	Chief of Staff Second Army (1942–1943); Chief of Staff 3rd Service Command (1943–1944); Commanded 3rd Service Command (1944–1945)	
Brigadier General	John N. Robinson	120	Commanded Fort Richardson (1943–1944); Assistant Division Commander 89th Infantry Division (1944–1945)	
Brigadier General	Robert W. Strong	73	Chief of Staff, U.S. Army Forces in Africa (1942–1943); Commanded Cavalry Replacement Training Center (1943–1945); Chief of U.S. Army Mission to Peru (1945–1946)	
Brigadier General	Victor V. Taylor	122	War Department General Staff (1941–1943); Munitions Assignment Board (1943–1944)	
Brigadier General	Clesen H. Tenney	77	Harbor Defense Commander, Central Pacific Area (1942–1943); Commanded 55th Coast Artillery Regiment (1944); 70th Antiaircraft Artillery Brigade (1945)	
Brigadier General	Edward C. Wallington	82	Chemical Officer, Third Army (1942–1945); Deputy Chief Chemical Officer (1949–1951)	
Brigadier General	Edwin A. Zundel	29	Artillery Officer, II Corps (1942), XI Corps (1943–1944), Sixth Army (1944–1945), 41st Infantry Division (1945–1946), Fourth Army (1946–1947)	
