= Henry J. F. Miller =

US Army general (1890–1949)

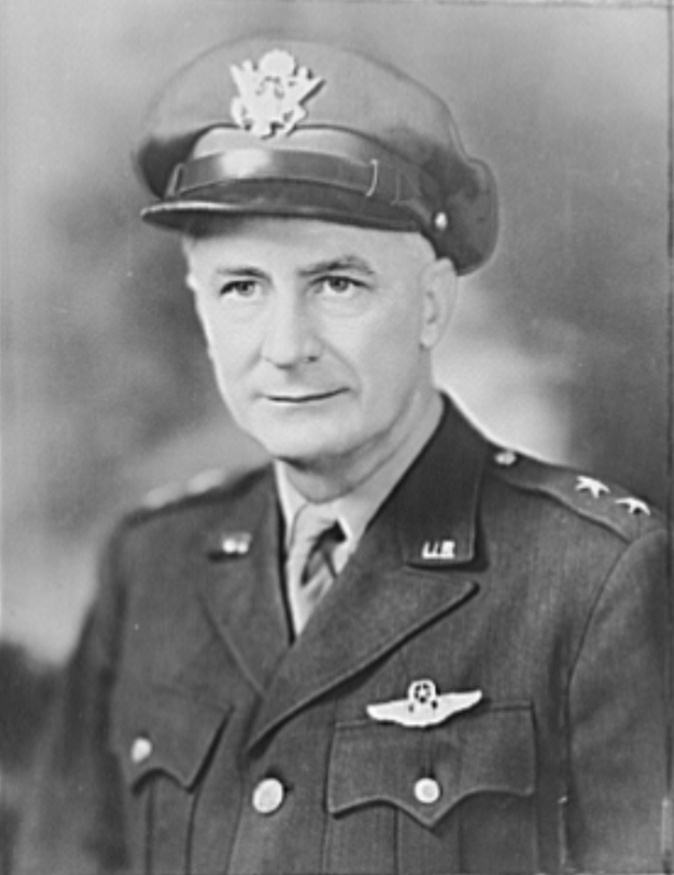
- Major General Henry J. F. Miller in 1944 before his demotion
- Born: September 10, 1890; Alloway Township, New Jersey, US
- Died: January 7, 1949 (aged 58); San Antonio, Texas, US
- Burial place: Fort Sam Houston National Cemetery
- Military career
- Allegiance: United States of America
- Branch: U.S. Cavalry; Aviation Section, U.S. Signal Corps; U.S. Army Air Service; U.S. Army Air Corps; U.S. Army Air Forces
- Service years: 1915–1944
- Rank: Major General
- Conflicts: World War I; World War II

Henry Jervis Friese Miller (September 10, 1890 – January 7, 1949) served as a general in the United States Army Air Forces during World War II.

While serving in the European theater, Miller made publicly recorded comments about the top secret date of the Allied invasion of Normandy in May 1944. After Supreme Allied Commander Dwight D. Eisenhower found out, Miller was demoted to lieutenant colonel and sent back to the United States.

== Early life ==
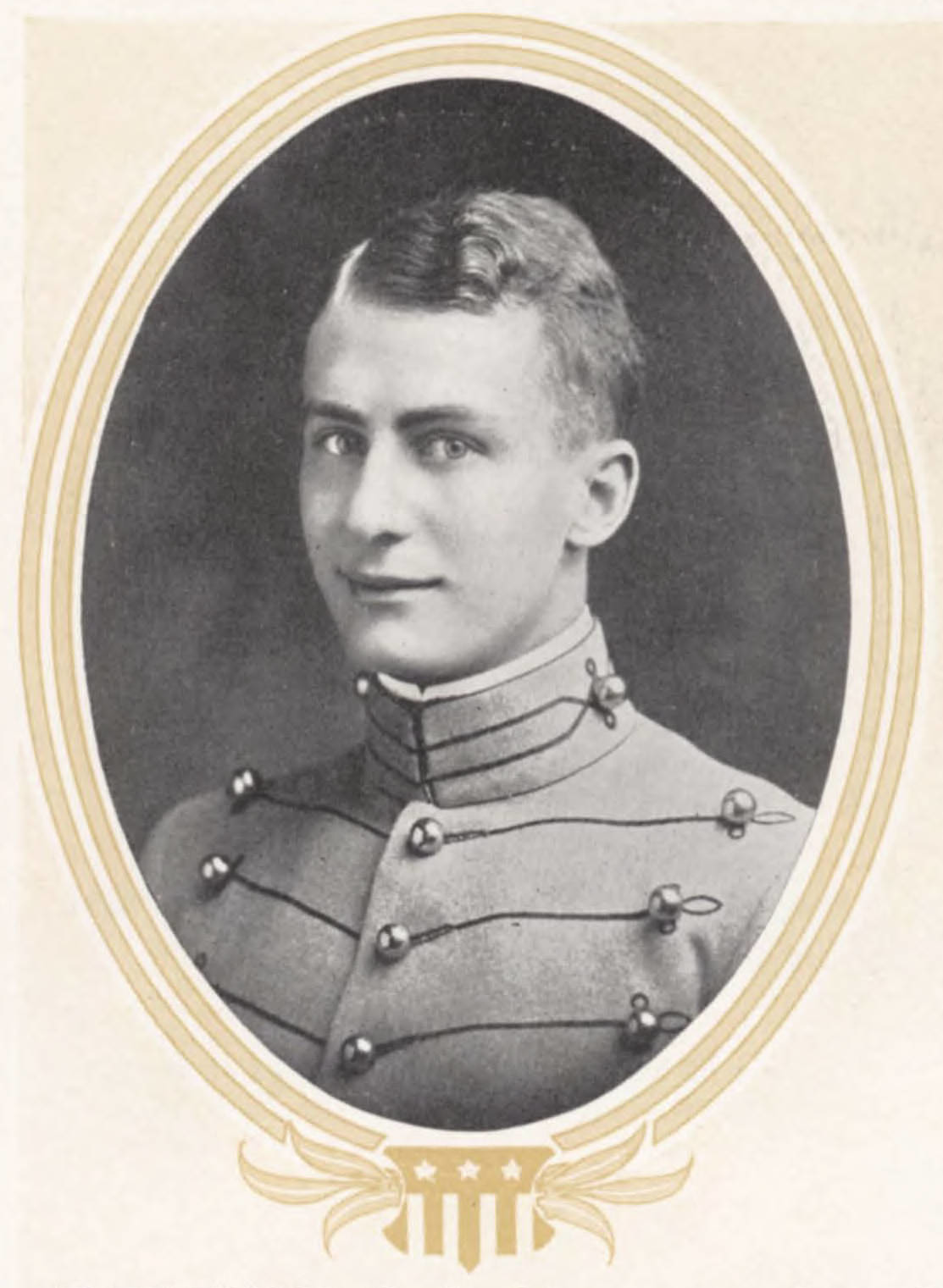
At West Point in 1915

Miller was born on September 10, 1890, in Alloway Township, New Jersey, to John and Mary Miller. After attending local public schools, he was accepted to the United States Military Academy and graduated with the class of 1915.

== Military career ==
After graduation, Miller was assigned as a second lieutenant in the United States Cavalry and served near El Paso, Texas, during the Pancho Villa Expedition of 1916. He was promoted to captain in 1917 and then major in 1918.

In 1917, Miller transferred to the Aviation Section, U.S. Signal Corps and completed primary flight training at Rockwell Field. He served with the American Expeditionary Forces in England from September to December 1918 during the last months of World War I.

In 1919, Miller returned to the United States. Between October 8–31, he participated in the Army Transcontinental Air Race, organized by the United States Army Air Service. Seven airmen were killed, two en route to the race.

In the interwar period, Miller served many assignments in the United States Army Air Service and then the United States Army Air Corps. When he became commanding officer of Duncan Field Air Depot, he was promoted to brigadier general in the Army Air Corps on 10 July 1941. Training and logistics units had kept the older name while all other units had been redesignated as the United States Army Air Forces on June 20, 1941.

He was promoted to major general on February 27, 1942, when he became the chief of the 9th Air Force Air Service Command, based out of Wright Field near Dayton, Ohio.

=== D-Day incident ===
Sometime in April 1944, while attending a dinner party at Claridge's in London, Miller leaked the date of the upcoming Operation Overlord during a conversation with a fellow officer, saying that "the invasion will come before June 15." An Associated Press account gives his comment as "On my honor the invasion will take place before June 15." When news of this security breach reached Supreme Allied Commander General Eisenhower in May 1944, Miller was demoted to his permanent rank of lieutenant colonel and sent home. As the incident was covered up until following the invasion, Congress would end up confirming a promotion in his permanent rank to colonel in May.

=== Retirement ===
On November 30, 1944, Miller retired from service due to physical disability. In December 1948, Miller was promoted to brigadier general on the retired list, just a few weeks prior to his death. The United Press reported on December 3, 1944, that he had taken an advisory job with a war plant.

== Death ==
Miller moved to San Antonio, Texas, in the spring of 1948 and lived there until his death on January 7, 1949. He was buried in the Fort Sam Houston National Cemetery, alongside his wife Vera Abigail, who had died on January 11, 1943.

== Awards ==
- Mexican Service Medal
- Victory Medal
- American Defense Service Medal
- American Campaign Medal
- European-African-Middle Eastern Campaign Medal
- World War II Victory Medal

== See also ==
- Ike: Countdown to D-Day, a 2004 made-for-TV movie which dramatized Miller's intelligence breach
- D-Day the Sixth of June, a 1956 movie in which the fictional Lieutenant Colonel Alexander Timmer is sent back to the US for a breach of security similar to Miller's
