= Attorney General Walton =

Attorney General Walton may refer to:

- John Lawson Walton (1852–1908), Attorney General for England and Wales
- William M. Walton (1832–1915), Attorney General of Texas

== See also ==
- General Walton (disambiguation)
