= Thomas J. Hanley Jr. =

US Air Force general (1893–1969)

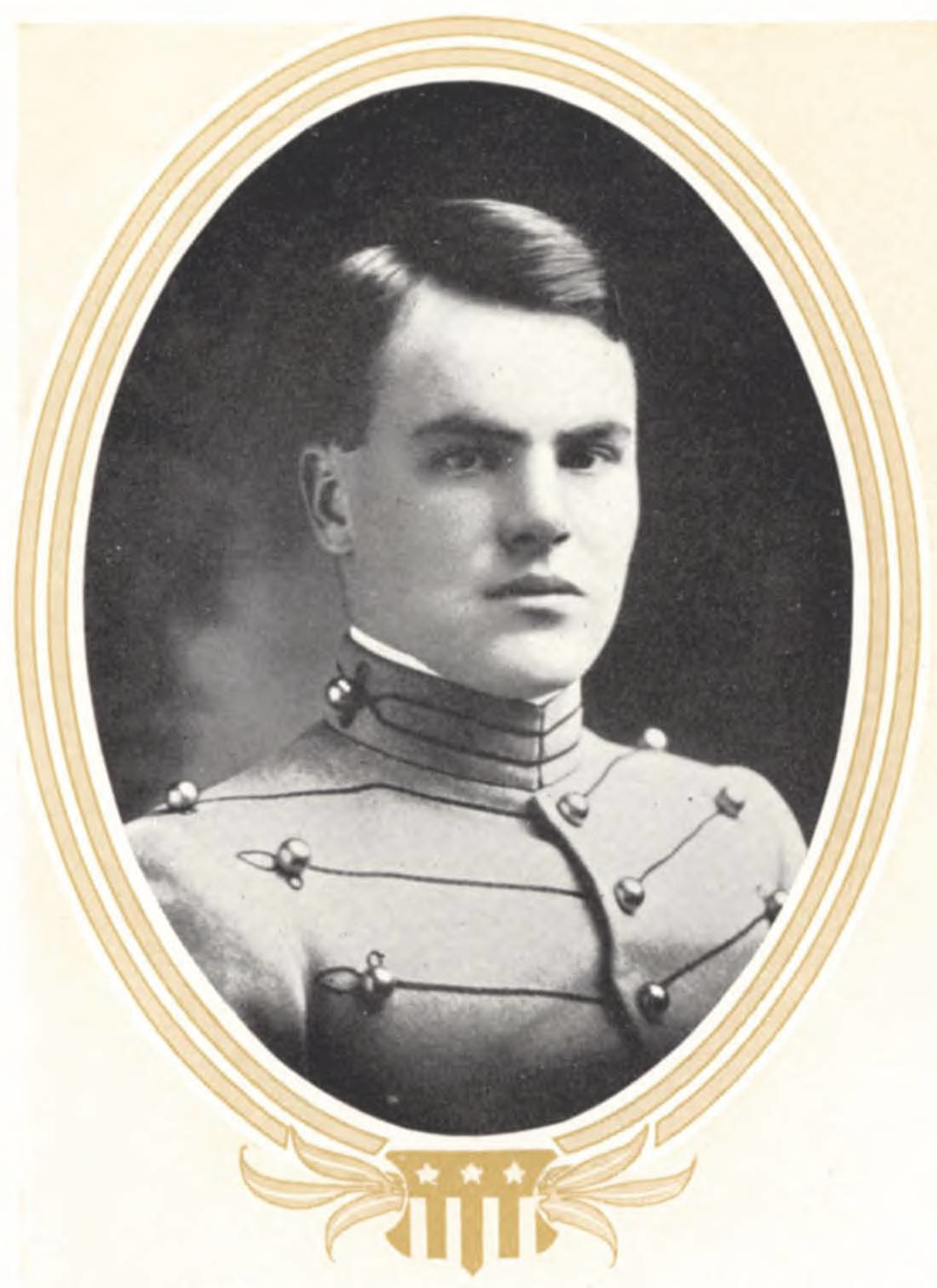
- At West Point in 1915
- Born: March 29, 1893; Coshocton, Ohio, United States
- Died: March 9, 1969 (aged 75); Boca Raton, Florida, United States
- Burial place: Arlington National Cemetery, Virginia, United States
- Spouse: Cecelia Meilleur
- Military career
- Allegiance: United States
- Branch: United States Army; United States Air Force
- Service years: 1915–1952
- Rank: Major General
- Commands: Mitchel Field; First Air Force base Southesast Air Force Training Center; Eastern Flight Training Command; Air Service Command China-India-Burma; 11th Air Force
- Conflicts: World War I; World War II
- Awards: Distinguished Service Medal; Legion of Merit with Oak Leaf Cluster; Air Medal; Honorary Companion of the Order of the Bath

Thomas James Hanley, Jr. (March 23, 1893 – March 9, 1969) was an American Air Force major general who served in the Pacific Theater during World War Two and commanded the 11th Air Force at the start of the Cold War.

== Early life ==
Thomas Hanley was born, in Coshocton, Ohio, the third of six children of Thoms Hanley Sr, an Irish immigrant, and Mary (O'Connor) Hanley.

== Military service ==
Hanley graduated from the United States Military Academy with the Class of 1915 ("the class the stars fell on") and was commissioned a second lieutenant of Infantry on June 12, 1915. Though originally assigned to the Twenty-Third Infantry in Texas, Hanley was moved to the Aviation Section of the Signal Corps in August 1916. He promptly entered the Corps's Aviation School in San Diego and was able to graduate from flying school by the following April. Following graduation, Hanley was assigned to the First Aero Squadron in New Mexico for about a month before being transferred to Texas to serve with the Fifth and then the Nineteenth Aero Squadrons.

In February 1918, he was given his first command, that of the 274th Aero Squadron, based at Taliaferro Field in Texas. The following month Hanley was appointed engineering officer and commanding officer of the entire airfield. He went on to command Carruthers Field, also in Texas, until December 1919. At this point Hanley was transferred to Langley Field, Virginia to serve as an executive officer. In July 1920, he was transferred to the Air Service from the Infantry. In November of that year he was appointed director of the administration course at what was later redesignated the Tactical School. In December 1921, Hanley was transferred to Kindley Field in the Philippines to command the 2nd Observation Squadron until August 1922 and the Provisional Administration Company until September 1922. He was then moved to Camp Nichols to assume command of the 28th Bombardment Squadron.

After returning to the United States in March 1924, Hanley was given command of Crissy Field in California. That August, he entered the Army Industrial College and graduated the following February at which point he was assigned the Office of the Assistant Secretary of War. In 1930 he graduated from the Command and General Staff School after two years of study and was placed as the assistant commandant of the Advanced Flying School. Following a short transfer to the Primary Flying School, Hanley became an instructor at the Command and General Staff School in 1932.

Hanley went on to be named the chief of the First Air Force and the base commander for that unit in June 1941. By the following January he had been assigned to the Army Air Force headquarters in Washington, where he later became the chief of staff. In May 1943 Hanley was given command of the Southeast Air Force Training Center at Maxwell Field in Alabama. A year later, he again left the United States, this time as the commanding general of the China-Burma-India Air Service Command. By July 1945, he had assumed command of all Army Air Forces in India and Burma, this in addition to his duties with the Air Service Command.

Hanley returned to Army Air Force headquarters in the United States in January 1946 and was given command of the 11th Air Force in June of the same year. He retired from the Air Force in 1952 at the rank of major general.

== Awards ==
On November 23, 1944 Hanley was awarded the Army Distinguished Service Medal for "exceptionally meritorious and distinguished service...as Commanding General Eastern Flight Training Command".

He was also awarded the Legion of Merit while serving as the Deputy Chief of Staff for the Headquarters of the U.S. Army Air Force. Hanley went on to earn a Bronze Oak Leaf Cluster in lieu of a second Legion of Merit.

Hanley was awarded the Air Medal and appointed Honorary Companion of the Order of the Bath.

== Personal life ==
Hanley married Cecelia Meilleur on June 12, 1917. They had two sons, Thomas James III, who also served in the Air Force, and Dexter Long, a Jesuit priest, as well as one daughter, Cecile Marie.

He died in Boca Raton, Florida on March 9, 1969, and was buried at Arlington National Cemetery.
