= Ike: Countdown to D-Day =

2004 American television film directed by Robert Harmon

- Written by: Lionel Chetwynd
- Directed by: Robert Harmon
- Starring: Tom Selleck; James Remar; Timothy Bottoms; Gerald McRaney; Ian Mune
- Theme music composer: Shinkichi Mitsumune
- Composer: Jeff Beal
- Country of origin: United States
- Original language: English

Production
- Producers: Dennis A. Brown; Paul Carran; Lionel Chetwynd; Tim Christenson; David Craig
- Cinematography: David Gribble
- Editor: Chris Peppe
- Running time: 89 minutes
- Production companies: A+E Networks; Lionel Chetwynd Productions; Stephanie Germain Productions; Sony Pictures Television

Original release
- Network: A&E
- Release: May 31, 2004

Ike: Countdown to D-Day is a 2004 American made-for-television historical war drama film originally aired on the American television channel A&E, directed by Robert Harmon and written by Lionel Chetwynd. Countdown to D-Day was filmed entirely in New Zealand.

The film describes General Eisenhower's stewardship of the role of Supreme Commander of the Allied Expeditionary Forces earmarked to invade western Europe in World War II. The film uses Eisenhower as the main focus, presenting the many obstacles that faced him as he presided over a coalition of American, British, and French leaders with different priorities. A main theme of the film is the wielding of power and the responsibility that comes with it.

== Plot ==
In December 1943, Dwight D. "Ike" Eisenhower discusses the invasion of German-occupied Europe with Prime Minister Winston Churchill. Eisenhower threatens to resign as Supreme Commander of SHAEF unless he is given total control of all operations. Churchill acquiesces, and Eisenhower plans the invasion with Bernard Montgomery, the ground forces commander, and Omar Bradley commander of the 1st US Army. Eisenhower reprimands George S. Patton for making comments to the press minimizing the importance of US allies, reminding him of the slapping incidents earlier in the war. Eisenhower confides to his chief of staff Walter Bedell Smith that he thinks Patton doesn't understand why they're fighting the war, but his skill at armoured warfare will be needed once the Allies are ashore. Sir Trafford Leigh-Mallory is critical of the plan, suggesting extraordinarily high casualty estimates for the airborne troops if favourable conditions aren't met.

When German E-Boats attack a convoy during a training exercise off the English coast, nearly a thousand soldiers are lost, along with precious LST landing craft. Bradley reports the Ghost Army has successfully deceived the Germans into believing the landings will occur at Pas-de-Calais under Patton's command. Believing that the deception will not last, Eisenhower sets the date of invasion for 5 June.

Eisenhower relieves his friend Henry Miller of his command for publicly disclosing sensitive information. The Allied leaders brief King George VI and Queen Elizabeth about Operation Overlord and the King confides his fears about heavy losses. Eisenhower admits he is worried also. In private, Eisenhower tells Churchill if the operation fails, he will absolve Churchill and President Franklin D. Roosevelt of any responsibility. Churchill is impressed, saying he admires Eisenhower's "manly choice" to shoulder the responsibility alone.

When Bradley and Smith report on redeployment of strong German forces to the American landing zones, Eisenhower is forced to mediate a heated debate between Leigh-Mallory and Bradley over potential airborne casualties. Bradley's view wins out, with Eisenhower mindful of the cost they may have to pay. The day before the landings, Eisenhower reluctantly meets with Charles de Gaulle, who disagrees with Eisenhower's views on AMGOT and who should address the French people by radio. A heavy rainstorm forces a 24-hour delay of the invasion to Tuesday, 6 June. Anxiously watching the weather reports, Eisenhower gives the final order for Operation Neptune despite the risks the weather may not favor the sea and air landings. Eisenhower visits American paratroopers at an airfield as they prepare to board their aircraft, and drafts a letter taking full responsibility for the failure of the Allies to create a beachhead in France, to be distributed to the press if the landings fail. As reports of a successful invasion arrive at headquarters, a message from Leigh-Mallory states the disastrous casualties he predicted had not come to pass, and he apologizes to Eisenhower for any stress he may have caused. Eisenhower takes a final walk through the operations room as the film fades to black.

== Cast ==
- Tom Selleck as Dwight D. Eisenhower
- James Remar as Omar Bradley
- Gerald McRaney as George S. Patton
- George Shevtsov as Charles de Gaulle
- Timothy Bottoms as Walter Bedell "Beetle" Smith
- Ian Mune as Prime Minister Winston Churchill
- Bruce Phillips as Bernard Law Montgomery
- Paul Gittins as Major General Henry Miller
- John Bach as Air Marshal Sir Trafford Leigh-Mallory
- Nick Blake as Air Marshal Arthur W. Tedder
- Kevin J. Wilson as Admiral Bertram Ramsay
- Christopher James Baker as Group Captain James Stagg
- Bruce Hopkins as U.S. Colonel at Savoy
- Gregor McLennan as Captain Chapman
- Paul Barrett as Major Wiatt
- Mick Rose as King George VI
- Carole Seay as Queen Elizabeth The Queen Mother
- Brian Gidley as Chief Whip
- Mark Cirillo as Paul A. Hodgeson
- Catherine Boniface as Woman at Savoy
- Rachel Wallis as WAC Sgt.
- Stephen Brunton as Corporal Younger
- David Mackie as Projector Sergeant
- Andrew Robertt as 101st Lt.
- Robert Pollock as 101st Sgt.
- Craig Hall as 101st Corporal
- Clint Sharplin as 101st Paratrooper
- Millen Baird as 101st Private
