= Albert W. Waldron =

US Army general (1892–1961)

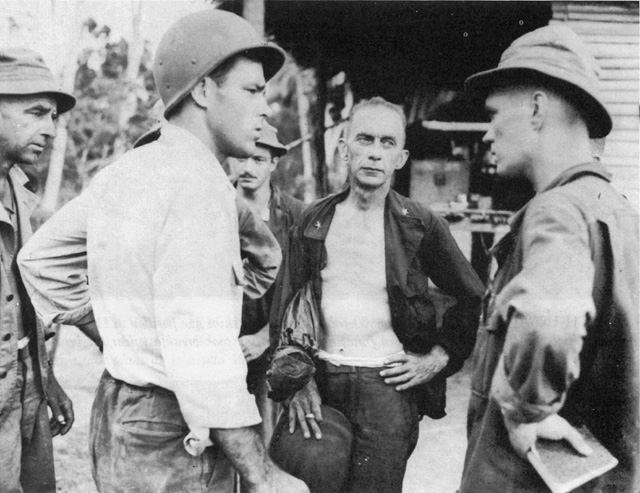
- Brigadier General Albert W. Waldron (center, facing forward) commanding the 32nd Division Artillery, discusses plans for an upcoming battle, 15 November 1942.
- Born: January 13, 1892; Rochester, New York, United States
- Died: June 21, 1961 (aged 69); San Francisco, California, United States
- Burial place: West Point Cemetery, New York, United States
- Military career
- Allegiance: United States
- Branch: United States Army
- Service years: 1915−1946
- Rank: Major General
- Service number: 0-3795
- Unit: Field Artillery Branch
- Commands: 32nd Infantry Division; 1st Battalion, 19th Field Artillery Regiment
- Conflicts: Pancho Villa Expedition; World War I World War II
- Awards: Distinguished Service Cross; Army Distinguished Service Medal

Major General Albert Whitney Waldron (January 13, 1892 – June 21, 1961) was a United States Army officer who served during World War II. He briefly replaced Major General Edwin F. Harding as the commander of the 32nd Infantry Division during the Battle of Buna–Gona and was wounded in the shoulder on 5 December 1942 after being shot by a sniper. He received the Distinguished Service Cross and the Army Distinguished Service Medal for his actions during the war.

== Early military career ==
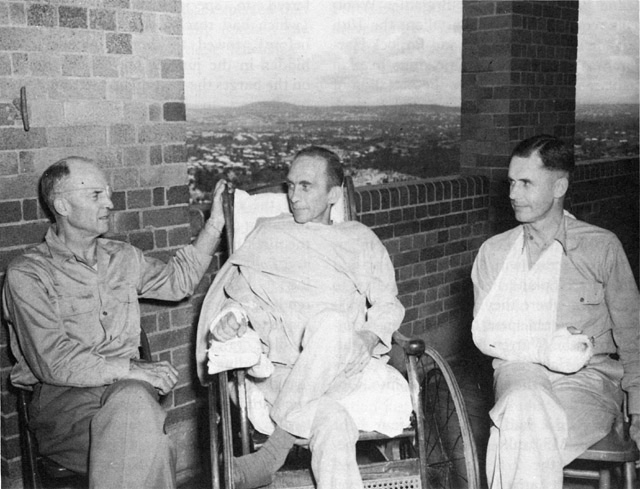
Brigadier Generals Hanford MacNider, Albert W. Waldron, and Clovis E. Byers recuperate in hospital in Australia after being wounded in the Battle of Buna-Gona.

Albert Whitney Waldron was born on January 13, 1892, in Rochester, New York. He attended the United States Military Academy at West Point, New York, in 1911 and graduated 34th of 164 four years later as a part of "the class the stars fell on" (59 members of this class became general officers during World War II). For example: Dwight D. Eisenhower, Omar Bradley, James Van Fleet, Henry Aurand, Stafford LeRoy Irwin, Paul J. Mueller, John W. Leonard, William E. R. Covell, Henry Aurand, Joseph T. McNarney, Roscoe B. Woodruff, Joseph May Swing, A. Arnim White, Thomas B. Larkin, and others. Waldron was commissioned a second lieutenant in the Field Artillery Branch of the United States Army on June 12, 1915.

His first military assignment was with the 4th Field Artillery Regiment stationed at Texas City, Texas. His unit was subsequently transferred to the Brownsville, Texas, where he served until March 1916, when he participated in Pancho Villa Expedition. After seven months of service in Mexico, Waldron, promoted on July 1 to first lieutenant, returned to the United States in October 1916 and was stationed at Eagle Pass, Texas.

He was promoted to captain on May 15, 1917, over a month after the American entry into World War I, and transferred to the 7th Field Artillery Regiment in July, which soon departed the United States for service on the Western Front, where Waldron would remain for the rest of the war.

== Decorations ==
Here is Major General Albert W. Waldron´s ribbon bar:

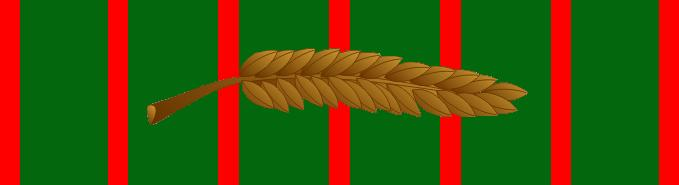

1st Row	Distinguished Service Cross		Army Distinguished Service Medal	Purple Heart
2nd Row	Mexican Service Medal	World War I Victory Medal with four Battle Clasps	Army of Occupation of Germany Medal	American Defense Service Medal
3rd Row	Asiatic-Pacific Campaign Medal with two service stars	American Campaign Medal	World War II Victory Medal	French Croix de Guerre 1914–1918 with Palm
