= Herman Beukema =

US Army general (1891–1960)

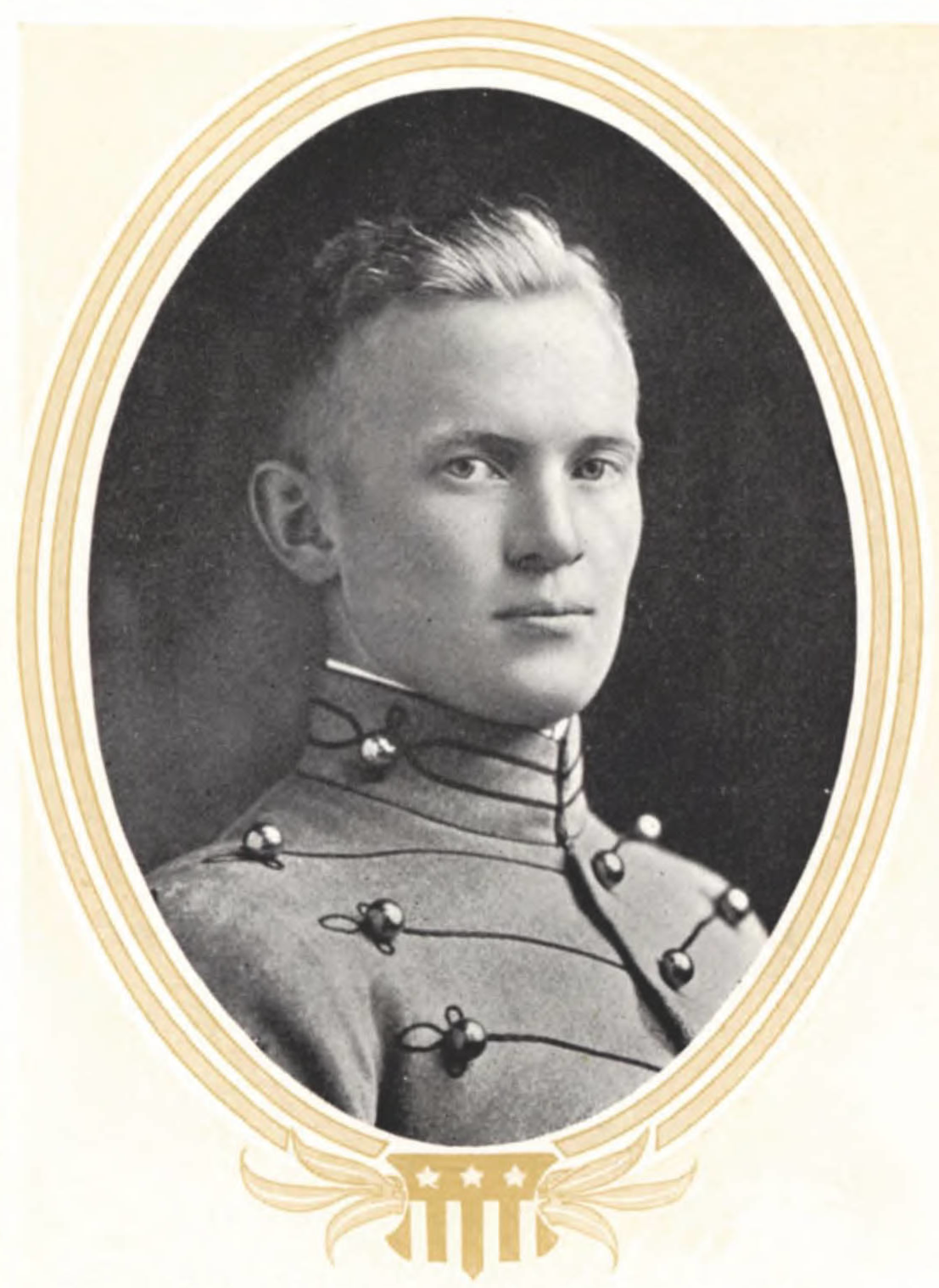
- At West Point in 1915
- Born: January 29, 1891; Muskegon, Michigan
- Died: November 26, 1960 (aged 69); Heidelberg, Germany
- Burial place: West Point Cemetery
- Education: University of Chicago; United States Military Academy
- Occupations: Military officer, writer

Herman Beukema (January 29, 1891 – November 26, 1960) was a brigadier general in the United States Army.

== Early life ==
Beukema was born in Muskegon, Michigan, to a family of Dutch immigrants. He was valedictorian of his high school, a reporter for the Muskegon Daily Chronicle and the Muskegon Morning News and a track enthusiast.

== Military career ==
After attending the University of Chicago, Beukema graduated from the United States Military Academy in 1915 in what many historians refer to as "the class the stars fell on" in reference to the 59 generals who would come from that class, most notably Omar Bradley and Dwight D. Eisenhower.

After being commissioned upon graduation, Beukema served on the Mexican frontier, and commanded an artillery battalion in France as a major when he was wounded in 1918. He studied at the Field Artillery School and at the Army Command and General Staff School. In 1928, Beukema joined the staff at the United States Military Academy as a professor of economics, government, and history. In 1930, Beukema became head of that department (renamed the Social Sciences Department in 1947), serving in that role until his retirement from the Army in 1954. He received honorary degrees from Washington & Jefferson University, Rutgers University, and Norwich University.

== Army Specialized Training Program ==
Beukema was a founder of the Army Specialized Training Program, an innovative effort to strengthen the Army by providing accelerated college education to intelligent enlisted soldiers. The Army Specialized Training Program also allocated funds to civilian tertiary education institutions to develop programs in international and military affairs. Beukema's efforts helped make the United States Military Academy a certified institution by the Association of American Colleges, and guaranteed that all Army graduates would receive a Bachelor of Science degree in addition to their commission.

== Scholarship ==
During his tenure at the United States Military Academy, Beukema became the foremost expert of geopolitik at the United States Army. He taught the first college course in the United States on the subject, and was recognized nationally as a leading geopolitician. Beukema concentrated his efforts in the geographic regions of Europe and the Far-East, and devoted most of his attention to Germany. Beukema wrote a series of essay's critiquing Karl Haushofer, a German professor at the Ludwig-Maximilians-Universität München. Haushofer was a pioneer in geopolitik thinking, and his teachings were a foundation for Adolf Hitler's framework for Nazi ideology. Beukema writings reveal geopolitik as an instrument of state power and the Nazis' use of geopolitik as a pretext for expansion and world domination. Beukema's teachings ensured that Academy graduates had a solid knowledge of economics, geography, and politics, and their relationship to national power. Because of his focus on Nazi Germany, Beukema earned a reputation as a leading "saber rattler" several years before the onset of World War II. Each year, the academy presents the Herman Beukema Memorial Award to its top political science graduate.

Beukema died on November 26, 1960, in Heidelberg, Germany, where he had been overseeing the University of Maryland's overseas study program. He was buried at West Point Cemetery.
