= Henry Benton Sayler =

US Army general (1893–1970)

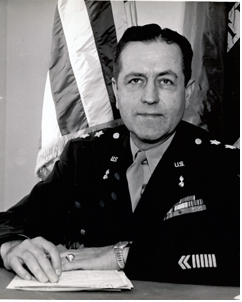
- Born: November 4, 1893; Huntington, Indiana, US
- Died: May 7, 1970 (aged 76); Savannah, Georgia, US
- Military career
- Allegiance: United States
- Branch: United States Army
- Service years: 1915–1949
- Rank: Major General
- Commands: Chief Ordnance Officer, European Theater of Operations United States Army
- Conflicts: World War I World War II: Operation Torch; Operation Overlord
- Awards: Distinguished Service Medal; Legion of Merit; Bronze Star Medal (2)

Henry Benton Sayler (November 4, 1893 – May 7, 1970) was a United States Army officer with the rank of major general. During the World War II, Sayler served as a Chief of Ordnance Officer of the European Theater of Operations.

== Early military career ==
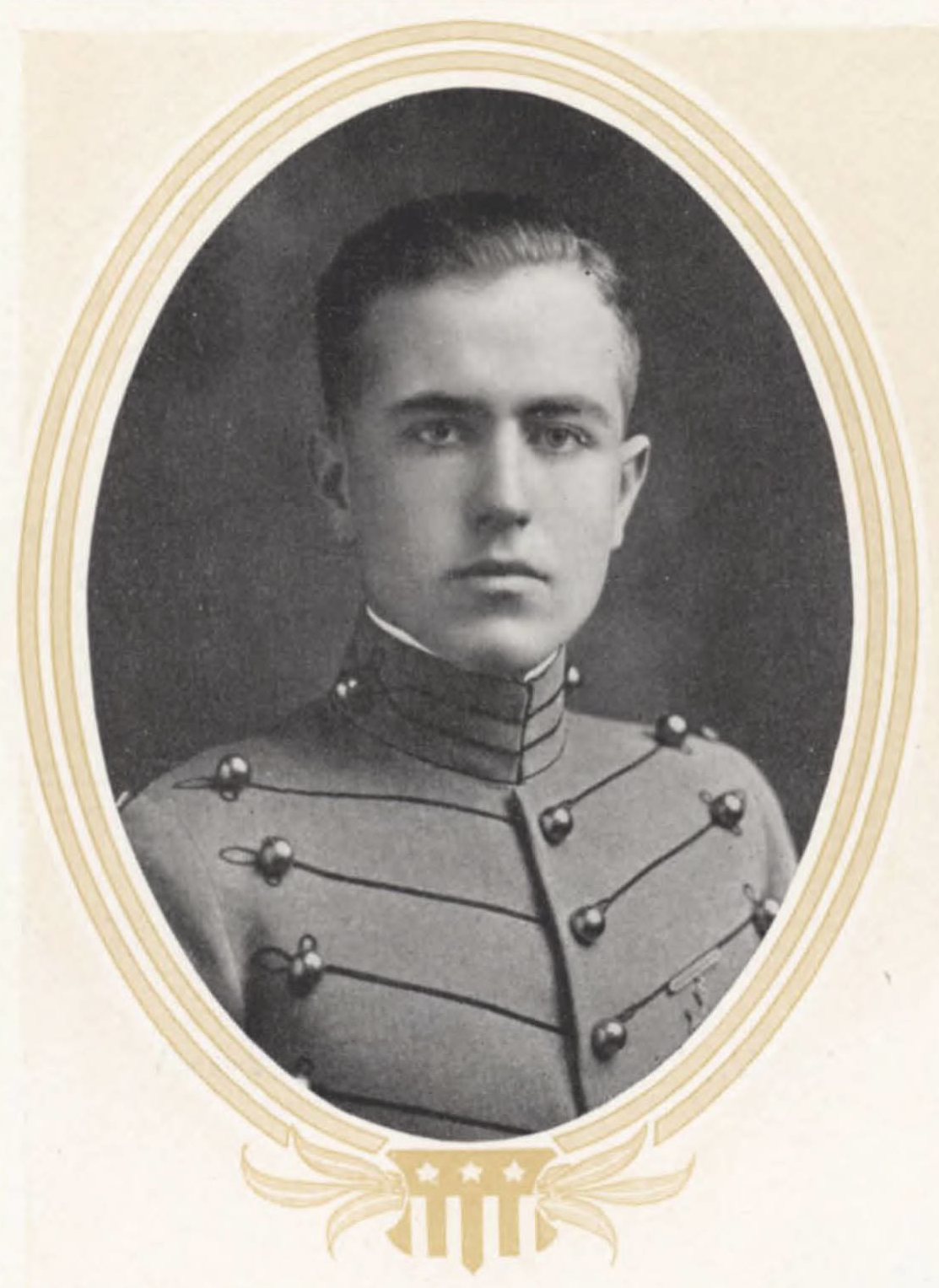
At West Point in 1915

Henry Benton Sayler was born on November 4, 1893, in Huntington, Indiana. He attended the Braden's Preparatory School in Highland Falls, New York and subsequently was appointed at United States Military Academy at West Point, New York in 1911. Sayler graduated four years later as a part of "the class the stars fell on" (because 59 members of this class became general officers). For example: Dwight D. Eisenhower, Omar N. Bradley, James Van Fleet, Henry Aurand, Stafford LeRoy Irwin, John W. Leonard or others. He was commissioned a second lieutenant in Coast Artillery Corps on June 12, 1915.

In 1921, he was transferred to the Ordnance Corps and subsequently served on various military posts across United States. Between 1931 and 1937, Sayler served as a member of the Cavalry Board. Sayler also attended the Command and General Staff College at Fort Leavenworth, Kansas in 1931.

In 1937, he was appointed a chief of General Supply Division in the Office of the Chief of Ordnance and served in this capacity until the end of next year, when he was assigned to the 4th Corps Area as its ordnance officer. Then he was appointed an ordnance officer of the First Army under the command of Lieutenant General Hugh Aloysius Drum.

== World War II ==
With the United States entry into World War II, Sayler's old West Point classmate, now commanding general of the U.S. Forces in the European Theater of Operations, Dwight D. Eisenhower, appointed him as chief ordnance officer of European Theater of Operations United States Army. In this capacity, Eisenhower tasked him to plan, assemble, and execute the ordnance support for the North African invasion.

During D-Day invasion he solved many problems, including waterproofing of vehicles and disposing bombs which didn't explode. Due to his great work at that time, U.S. Forces was one of the best-equipped fighting forces in the history of warfare. Sayler stayed in this capacity until August 1945, when he was appointed an Assistant Chief of Ordnance, deputy of lieutenant general, Levin H. Campbell, Jr.

For his service during the War, Sayler was decorated with the Army Distinguished Service Medal, Legion of Merit and with two Bronze Star Medals.

After the war, he was given a position as a chief at the research and development, Ordnance Department. Sayler retired from the army with the rank of major general in 1949. Sayler died on May 7, 1970, at the age of 76 in Savannah, Georgia. He is buried together with his wife Jessie Sayler at Arlington National Cemetery in Virginia.

== Decorations ==
Here is the ribbon bar of Major General Henry B. Sayler:

| 1st Row | Army Distinguished Service Medal | | Legion of Merit | Bronze Star Medal with Oak Leaf Cluster | |
| 2nd Row | World War I Victory Medal | American Defense Service Medal | | American Campaign Medal | European-African-Middle Eastern Campaign Medal with four Service Stars |
| 3rd Row | World War II Victory Medal | Commander of the Order of the British Empire | | Officer of the Legion of Honor (France) | French Croix de guerre 1939-1945 with Palm |
