= William E. R. Covell =

US Army general

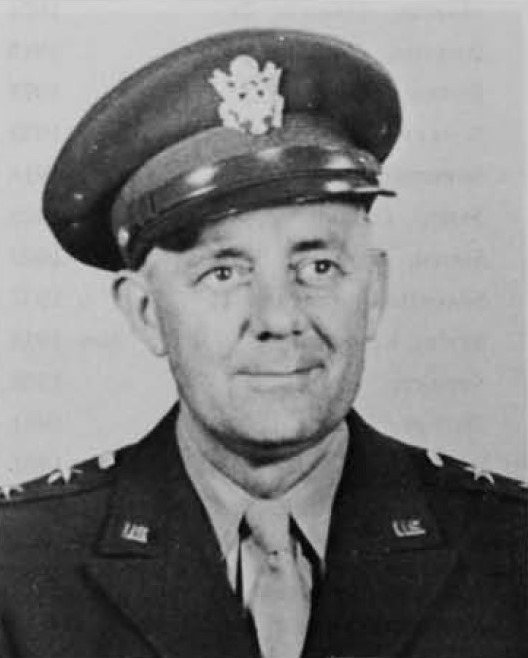
- Born: 29 November 1892; Washington D.C.
- Died: 16 August 1975 (aged 82); Fort Ord, California
- Spouses: 1. Vera Henshaw (m. 1917; died 1948); 2. Kathleen Fraley Geitner (m. 1951; died 1956); 3. Elva McFarlin Van Meter (m. 1957)
- Relatives: Beverly Covell Ferguson, daughter
- Military career
- Allegiance: United States
- Branch: United States Army
- Service years: 1915–1940; 1941–1946
- Rank: Major General
- Nickname: Billy
- Service number: 0-3768
- Unit: United States Army Corps of Engineers
- Commands: Director of Fuels and Lubricants; Services of Supply, China Burma India Theater
- Conflicts: World War I World War II
- Awards: Distinguished Service Medal (2)

Major general William Edward Raab Covell (29 November 1892 – 16 August 1975) graduated first in the 1915 West Point class that later became known as the class the stars fell on due to the high number of cadets who went on to attain general officer rank; this was more than any other class in the history of the academy. For comparison, out of 164 cadets, two Generals of the Army were Omar Bradley (44th) and Dwight D. Eisenhower (61st). Covell served two stints in the U.S. Army, the first was from 1915 to 1940; he was recalled to active service during World War II from 1941 to 1946.

== Early life ==
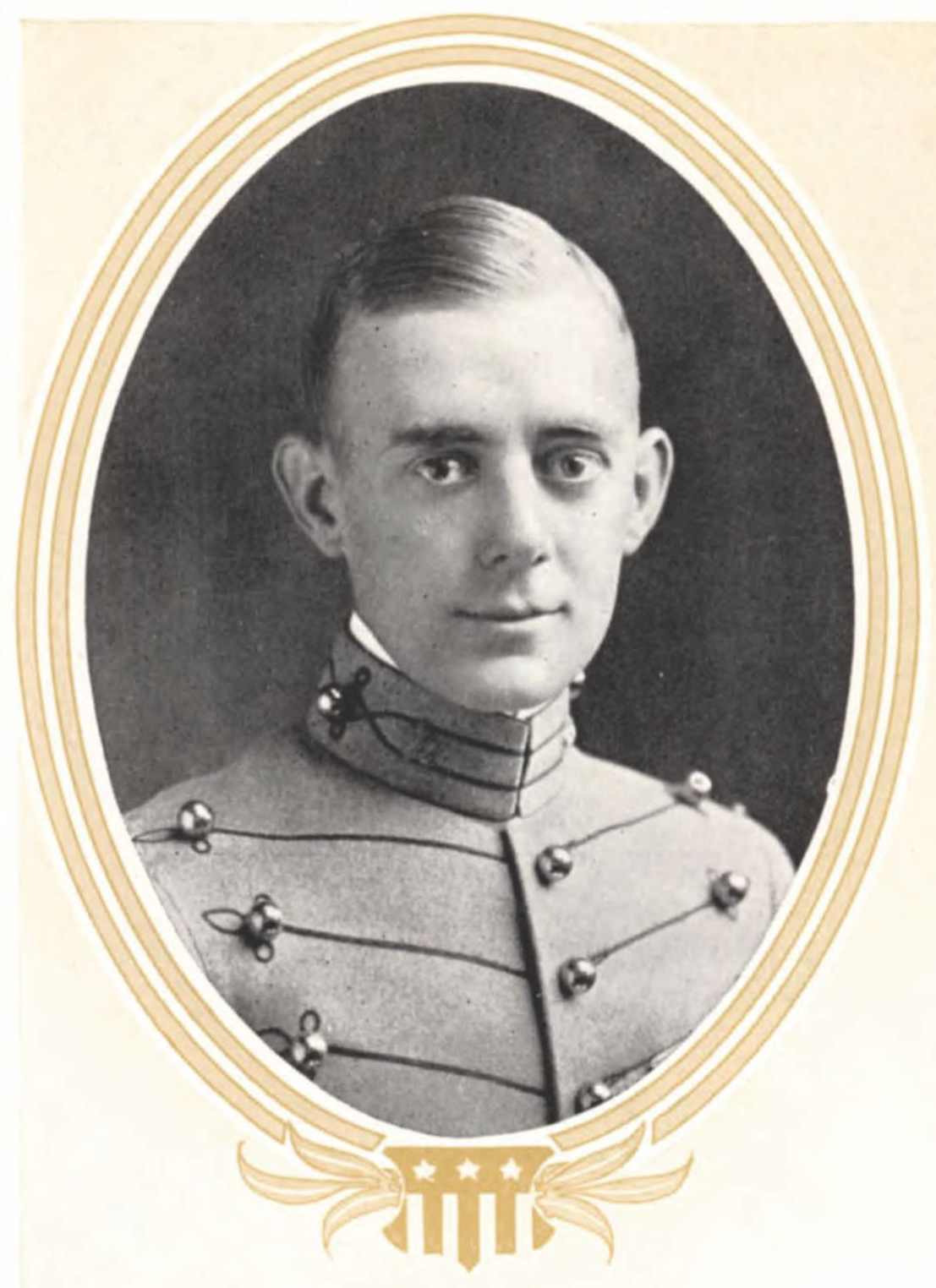
Covell in his graduation year at West Point c. 1915

Covell was born on 29 November 1892 in Washington, D.C.. On 14 June 1911, he entered the United States Military Academy at West Point, New York. He graduated first in his class of 164 on 12 June 1915 as a member of the class the stars fell on; his Cullum number is 5313. Dwight D. Eisenhower was ranked 61st in the same class.

== Corp of Engineers ==
Covell was commissioned as a second lieutenant in the Corps of Engineers on 12 June 1915 upon graduating from the Military Academy. He served as an instructor in the Department of Tactics at the academy in June and July 1915 before departing on his graduation leave. In October 1915, he reported for company-level duty at Fort Shafter, Territory of Hawaii. While serving at Fort Shafter, Covell was promoted to first lieutenant, Corps of Engineers on 12 January 1916. While a lieutenant in Hawaii, Covell wrote "Military Roads on the Island of Oahu"; the article was published in the November–December 1917 edition of Professional Memoirs.

Covell was promoted to captain, Corps of Engineers on 31 July 1917. He returned to the Continental United States in July 1917 and reported for duty with the Second Engineer Regiment at El Paso, Texas, where he was temporarily promoted to major, Corps of Engineers on 5 August 1917.

== World War I ==
Covell sailed to France with the Second Engineer Regiment and remained with that unit until 21 October 1917. Covell spent several months in school assignments: student officer at the 1st Corps Schools, Gondrecourt, France until 20 November 1917; instructor at the 1st Corps Schools until 19 January 1918; student officer at the British Royal Engineer School, Blendecques, France until 2 February 1918; student officer at the Army School of the Line, Langres, France until 1 May 1918; and Director, 1st Corps Engineer School, Gondrecourt, France until 21 July 1918.

He was next assigned to the duty with the G3 Headquarters, First Army until the armistice with Germany in November 1918.

== Inter-war period ==
On 14 November, Covell was temporarily promoted to lieutenant colonel of engineers, U. S. Army. He transferred to and commanded the 2nd Engineer Regiment at Neuwied, Germany (20 November 1918 – 3 May 1919). He then served as an instructor and student at the Army Engineer School in Virginia from September 1919 to August 1920. Covell reverted to his permanent rank of captain in February 1920 before being promoted to major in July 1920. He served as district engineer in Buffalo, New York from August 1920 to June 1922. Covell then enrolled at the Massachusetts Institute of Technology, earning a B.S. degree in civil engineering in June 1923.

Covell served in Washington, D.C., from June 1923 to May 1928. He then attended the Command and General Staff School at Fort Leavenworth, graduating in June 1930. Covell returned to the Engineer School as an instructor from August 1930 to June 1931. He then served as the executive officer at Fort Humphreys until April 1933. Covell served as assistant engineer of maintenance in the Panama Canal Zone from May 1933 to May 1936. He was promoted to lieutenant colonel in March 1936. Covell served as district engineer in Pittsburgh until 31 May 1940, when he retired from active duty.

After his retirement, Covell became general manager of Crossett Arkansas Companies in Crossett, Arkansas. He was recalled to active duty in the Army on 1 June 1941.

== World War II ==
Covell received temporary promotions to colonel in February 1942, brigadier general in June 1943 and major general in November 1943. He served as Director of Fuels and Lubricants in the Office of Quartermaster General from 1943 to 1944. Covell commanded Services of Supply, China Burma India Theater from 1944 to 1945. He was awarded two Distinguished Service Medals for his World War II service.

Covell was released from active duty on 31 January 1946. He was advanced to major general on the retired list in August 1948.

=== Later life ===
After the war, Covell joined the engineering and design firm Parsons, Brinckerhoff, Hogan and Macdonald. He became fluent in Spanish while representing the firm in South America.

== Personal life ==
He wed Vera Henshaw on 16 July 1917.

His older brother Leon C. Covell served as the second vice commandant of the United States Coast Guard; retiring as a vice admiral after World War II.

== Death ==
Covell died at Fort Ord, California on 16 August 1975. His papers are held by the Hoover Institution Library, Stanford University.

== Awards ==
World War I Victory Medal
Army of Occupation of Germany Medal

== Bibliography ==
- Haskew, Michael E. (2014). West Point 1915: Eisenhower, Bradley, and the Class the Stars Fell On. Zenith Press. ISBN 9780760346525. OCLC 868040150.
