= Walter W. Hess =

US Army general (1892–1972)

Walter W. Hess Jr.
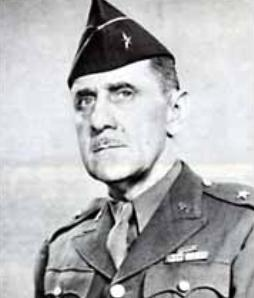
- Born: March 17, 1892; Pennsylvania, US
- Died: April 10, 1972 (aged 80); Santa Clara County, California, US
- Military career
- Allegiance: United States
- Branch: United States Army
- Service years: 1915-1952
- Rank: Brigadier General
- Unit: Coast Artillery Corps
- Commands: Artillery Commander, 36th Infantry Division
- Conflicts: World War I World War II: Allied invasion of Italy; Battle of Monte Cassino; Battle of Anzio; Operation Dragoon; Colmar Pocket
- Awards: Legion of Merit (2); Bronze Star (2)

Walter Wood Hess Jr. (March 17, 1892 – April 10, 1972) was a United States Army brigadier general. He is most famous for his leadership as the commander of the artillery of the 36th Infantry Division.

== Early life ==
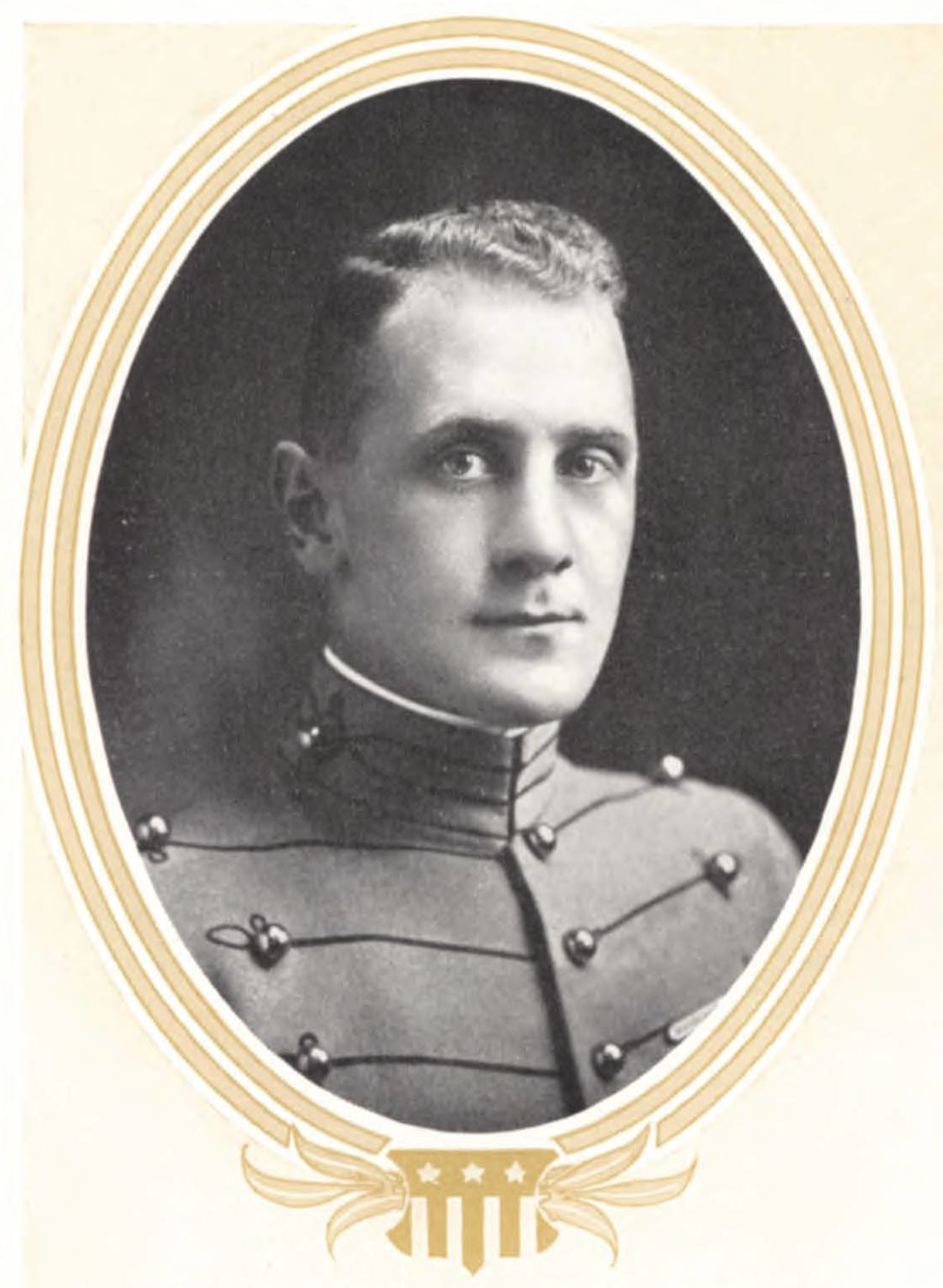
At West Point in 1915

Walter Wood Hess Jr. was born in March 1892 in Pennsylvania. He attended the United States Military Academy at West Point, New York, in 1911, and graduated 95th as part of the class the stars fell on in June 1915. He was one of 59 members of that graduating class who became generals, among them Dwight D. Eisenhower and Omar Bradley.

He served in France during World War I as an artillery officer, having been commissioned in the Coast Artillery Corps, commanding a battalion. He participated in the Meuse-Argonne Offensive and Ypres - Lys Offensives.

== World War II ==
He was appointed an artillery officer of the 36th Infantry Division in November 1943. He succeeded Brigadier General Miles A. Cowles in this capacity. Hess participated with the 36th Division in the landing at Salerno, Battle of Monte Cassino, Battle of Anzio, Operation Dragoon and Colmar Pocket.

For his leadership of the 36th Infantry Division artillery, Hess was awarded the Legion of Merit and other awards.

== Postwar career ==
After inactivation of the 36th Infantry Division in December 1945, Hess was transferred to Fort Bragg in North Carolina, where he was appointed as Assistant Commanding General of the Field Artillery Replacement Training Center. Following year, Hess was appointed as Commanding General of that center and succeeded Major General Donald C. Cubbison.

Hess served in this capacity just for a short time, because he was transferred back to Europe in 1946 and appointed a Chief of U.S. Military Liaison Mission to Soviet Zone in Germany.

He served there until year 1949, when he was ordered back to the United States and appointed as Executive Officer of the Minnesota Military District. His last command was as Commandant of Fort Carson in Colorado from 1950 to 1952, when he retired.

Brigadier general Walter W. Hess Jr. died on April 10, 1972, and is buried at Arlington National Cemetery together with his wife Ada E. Hess.

== Decorations ==
Legion of Merit with Oak Leaf Cluster
Bronze Star Medal with Oak Leaf Cluster
Army Commendation Medal
World War I Victory Medal with three Battle Clasps
American Defense Service Medal
American Campaign Medal
European-African-Middle Eastern Campaign Medal with six Service Stars
World War II Victory Medal
Army of Occupation Medal
National Defense Service Medal
