= William F. Tompkins (United States Army officer) =

United States Army general (1892–1969)

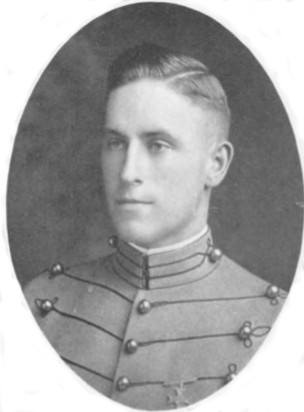
- William F. Tompkins, pictured here in 1915 at West Point.
- Born: 22 September 1892; Richmond, Virginia, United States
- Died: 26 October 1969 (aged 77); Richmond, Virginia, United States
- Burial place: Arlington National Cemetery, Virginia, United States
- Military career
- Allegiance: United States
- Branch: United States Army
- Service years: 1915–1946
- Rank: Major General
- Service number: 0-3780
- Unit: Corps of Engineers
- Commands: 8th Engineer Battalion
- Conflicts: World War I World War II
- Awards: Legion of Merit; Army Distinguished Service Medal; Purple Heart

Major General William Frazer Tompkins (22 September 1892 – 26 October 1969) was a United States Army officer who was a graduate of the United States Military Academy (USMA) at West Point, New York in the famous class of 1915, also known as the class the stars fell on, and as such was a classmate of Dwight D. Eisenhower and Omar Bradley, among many others who ultimately became general officers. During World War II he served on the War Department General Staff, where his responsibility was in planning for post-war demobilization.

== Early life ==
William Frazer Tompkins was born in Richmond, Virginia, on 22 September 1892, the son of Dr. Christopher Tompkins, a professor of anatomy and obstetrics at the Medical College of Virginia, and dean of the medical faculty there, and his wife Bessie née McCaw. His grandfather, Captain Christopher Quarles Tompkins, was a graduate of the United States Military Academy (USMA) at West Point, New York in the class of 1836 and half brother of Sally Louisa Tompkins.

== World War I ==
Tompkins entered West Point on 14 June 1911, and graduated on 12 June 1915, ranked 16th in the class of 1915, which also included Dwight D. Eisenhower and Omar Bradley. The class became known as the class the stars fell on because so many of its members eventually wore the stars of a general officer. Tompkins played polo on the academy team. He was commissioned as a second lieutenant in the United States Army Corps of Engineers, and was sent to the United States Army Engineer School at Washington Barracks, DC, as a student, and performed additional duty as junior military aide at the White House, during which he was promoted to first lieutenant on 1 July 1916.

From 23 September 1916 to 11 January 1917, Tompkins served with the Mexican Expedition as an officer in the 2nd Engineers, after which he returned to the Engineer School to complete his training as a military engineer. He graduated on 14 April, just eight days after the American entry into World War I. He then became the adjutant of the 19th Engineers (Railway), with the rank of captain from 15 May 1917. The 19th Engineers went to France via England in August, and he went to the Western Front in command of a battalion of the 56th Engineers, a searchlight unit attached to the French 1st Army. He was awarded the Purple Heart, and promoted to the temporary rank of major on 10 September 1918.

== Between the wars ==
Tompkins returned to the United States in March 1919, four months after the Armistice with Germany which ended the war, where he was assigned to the Office of the Chief of Engineers, and married Elizabeth Hamilton, to whom he had become engaged while working in the White House. They had three sons. He reverted to his substantive rank of captain on 15 March 1920. He was promoted to major again on 1 July 1920 but reverted to captain again on 4 November 1922, and was promoted to major for the third time on 30 December 1923. He was district engineer in Savannah, Georgia from 12 August 1925 to 31 July 1928.

After attending the United States Army Command and General Staff College at Fort Leavenworth, Kansas from 1 September 1928 to 21 June 1929, Tompkins assumed command of the 8th Engineer Battalion at Fort McIntosh, Texas. He then returned to Washington, D.C., as a student at the Army War College. On graduation on 18 July 1932 he was detailed to the War Department General Staff until 28 June 1935. He was then assigned to the Office of the Corps of Engineers as a consulting engineer to the Works Progress Administration. Promoted to lieutenant colonel on 1 April 1936, Tompkins was New Orleans District Engineer from 15 June 1936 to 15 July 1940.

== World War II ==
Tompkins returned to duty with the Office of the Chief of Engineers, and was promoted to colonel in the Army of the United States (AUS) on 26 June 1941. On 7 July 1941 he became chief engineer at General Headquarters (GHQ), which became Army Ground Forces in March 1942, three months after the United States officially entered World War II. He was promoted to brigadier general (AUS) on 25 July 1942. He served on the staff of Army Service Forces from 15 May 1943 to 22 July 1943. He then became the director of the Special Planning Division of the War Department General Staff. In this role he was responsible for post-war planning, which included planning for demobilization and the post-war structure of the Army. He was promoted to major general (AUS) on 7 August 1944. For his services in this role, he was awarded the Army Distinguished Service Medal.

On 30 July 1945, Tompkins went to Manila as the Deputy Commander and Chief of Staff of the Army Service Command. After war ended the command moved to Yokohama. For his services he was awarded the Legion of Merit. Although he survived the war unscathed, his oldest son, Major William Frazer Tompkins Jr., who commanded of a heavy ponton battalion, and his second son, Lieutenant George Hamilton Tompkins, an Air Force night fighter pilot, were both killed. His youngest son, Christopher joined the United States Marine Corps, in which he attained the rank of captain, but was not allowed to go overseas owing to the deaths of his brothers.

== Later life ==
After an examination at Walter Reed Hospital, Tompkins retired from the Army because of a disability on 30 June 1946. He accepted a position as executive director of the Board of Regents of Gunston Hall, Virginia. In this role, charged with the maintenance of the historic mansion. In September 1947 he returned to Richmond, Virginia, as Comptroller of the Medical College of Virginia, where his father, brother and maternal grandfather had been the dean. He was a member of the Society of the Cincinnati, the Virginia Historical Society, General Society of Colonial Wars and the Military Order of the World Wars. He liked to spend his summers at a house he bought in Center Sandwich, New Hampshire, in 1943, and was involved with the Sandwich Historical Society, eventually becoming its president.

Tompkins died in Richmond on 26 October 1969, and was buried in Arlington National Cemetery.

== Dates of rank ==
Insignia	Rank	Component	Date	Reference
	Second lieutenant	Corps of Engineers	12 June 1915	
	First lieutenant	Corps of Engineers	1 July 1916	
	Captain	Corps of Engineers	15 May 1917	
	Major (temporary)	Corps of Engineers	10 September 1918	
	Captain (reverted)	Corps of Engineers	15 March 1920	
	Major	Corps of Engineers	1 July 1920	
	Captain (reverted)	Corps of Engineers	4 November 1922	
	Major	Corps of Engineers	30 December 1923	
	Lieutenant colonel	Corps of Engineers	1 April 1936	
	Colonel	Army of the United States	26 June 1941	
	Brigadier general	Army of the United States	25 July 1942	
	Colonel	Corps of Engineers	12 June 1943	
	Major general	Army of the United States	7 August 1944	
	Major general	Retired List	30 June 1946	
