= Leo A. Walton =

US Air Force general (1890–1961)

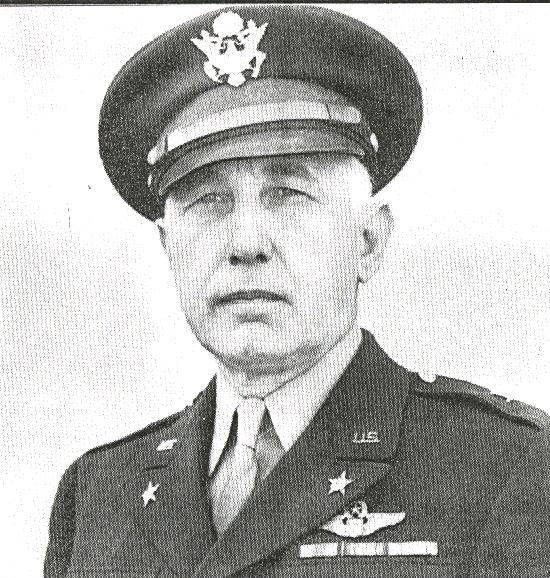
- Born: October 7, 1890; Salem, Oregon, US
- Died: September 7, 1961 (aged 70); Orlando, Florida, US
- Burial place: Arlington National Cemetery, Virginia, US
- Military career
- Allegiance: United States of America
- Branch: United States Air Force
- Service years: 1915–1949
- Rank: Major general
- Conflicts: Pancho Villa Expedition; World War I World War II
- Awards: Legion of Merit; Bronze Star Medal; Army Commendation Medal

Major General Leo Andrew Walton (October 7, 1890 – September 7, 1961) was one of the original members of the Aviation Section of the Signal Corps of 1916 and a veteran of World War II.

== Early years ==
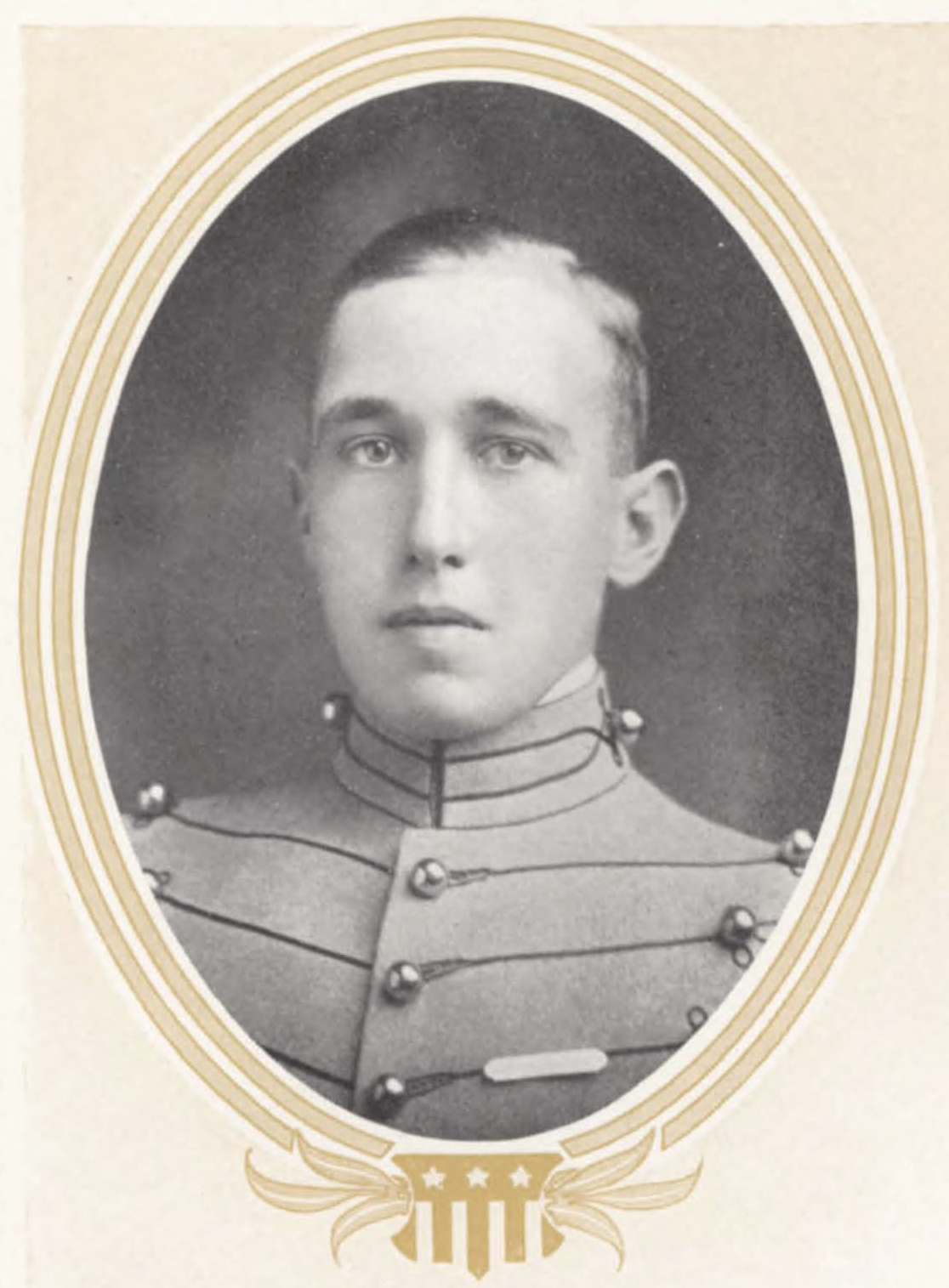
At West Point in 1915

Leo Andrew Walton was born on October 7, 1890, in Salem, Oregon. He attended United States Military Academy at West Point, New York, and graduated in 1915 as a part of "the class the stars fell on" (because 59 members of this class became general officers). He was commissioned a second lieutenant of cavalry on June 12, 1915, and subsequently participated in the Pancho Villa Expedition in Mexico under general John J. Pershing.

When he came back from his assignment in 1916, he decided to study aviation. In August 1917, he graduated from Brooks Field, Texas and became the officer in charge of flying at Brooks Field in March 1918. Two years later, on July 1, he was repositioned from the field artillery to air artillery.

== Interwar years ==
In November 1920, he enrolled at the Field Officers' School in Langley Field, Virginia, and graduated in August 1921. He was then assigned to the Office, Chief of the Air Service, in Washington, D.C. In June 1923, he was assigned to the McCook Field, Ohio, where he attended the Air Service Engineering School and a year later became assistant chief in there. In August 1925 he was stationed in the Philippines as commanding officer at Kindley Field, Fort Mills. Later on he became a commander at Clark Field, where he was in charge of the 3rd Pursuit Squadron till May 1928. The same year he came back home, and became an assistant commandant at March Field, California.

In September 1937, Walton was enrolled into the Command and General Staff School at Fort Leavenworth, Kansas, after which he was stationed at Maxwell Field, Alabama, in the Air Corps Tactical School. Three years later he was transferred into the Air Corps Advanced Flying School at Stockton Army Airfield in Stockton, California.

== Second World War ==
When World War II began, he was sent to the headquarters of the West Coast Training Center at Santa Ana, California, where he served as chief of staff, which position he held till 1945. He also held that position while working with 6th Air Force and the Caribbean Defense Command. He was stationed in China as an air inspector in July 1945, for which he was awarded the Bronze Star.

He was also awarded Legion of Merit award for his resourceful planning at the Western Flying Training Command. Walton retired from the Air Force on June 30, 1949, and died September 7, 1961. He was buried at Arlington National Cemetery.

== Decorations ==

USAF Command Pilot wings
1st Row	Legion of Merit		Bronze Star Medal	
2nd Row	Army Commendation Medal	Mexican Service Medal	World War I Victory Medal	American Defense Service Medal
3rd Row	American Campaign Medal	Asiatic-Pacific Campaign Medal with two service stars	World War II Victory Medal	Chinese Order of the Cloud and Banner 4th Class
