= 1913 All-Eastern football team =

American all-star college football team

The 1913 All-Eastern football team consists of American football players chosen by various selectors as the best players at each position among the Eastern colleges and universities during the 1913 college football season.

== All-Eastern selections ==
=== Quarterbacks ===
- Alexander Wilson, Yale (NYG-2; WA-1)
- Milt Ghee, Dartmouth (FM-1)
- Ellery Huntington Jr., Colgate (NYS-1)
- Gus Dorais, Notre Dame (NYG-1)
- Vernon Prichard, Army (FM-2)
- Shorty Miller, Penn State (NYS-2)

=== Halfbacks ===
- Joe Guyon, Carlisle (FM-1; NYS-1; NYG-1; WA-1)
- Eddie Mahan, Harvard (FM-1; NYS-1; NYG-1)
- Lawrence Whitney, Dartmouth (FM-2; NYS-2; NYG-2; WA-1)
- Johnny Spiegel, Washington & Jefferson (FM-2)
- Ed Hudson, Trinity (NYS-2)
- Caroll Knowles, Yale (NYG-2)

=== Fullbacks ===
- Charles Brickley, Harvard (FM-1; NYS-1; NYG-1; WA-1)
- Pete Calac, Carlisle (FM-2)
- Minds, Penn (NYS-2)
- Lou Young, Penn (NYG-2)

=== Ends ===
- Hube Wagner, Pittsburgh (FM-2; NYG-1; WA-1)
- Louis A. Merrilat, Army (FM-1; NYS-1)
- Robert Hogsett, Dartmouth (FM-1; NYG-2)
- William Fritz, Cornell (NYS-1; NYG-2)
- Huntington Hardwick, Harvard (FM-2; NYG-1)
- Frank Glick, Princeton (WA-1)
- Paul Loudon, Dartmouth (NYS-2)
- John Markoe, Army (NYS-2)

=== Tackles ===
- Harold Ballin, Princeton (FM-2; NYS-1; NYG-1; WA-1)
- Bud Talbott, Yale (FM-2; NYS-1; NYG-1)
- Robert Treat Paine Storer, Harvard (FM-1; WA-1)
- Harvey Rexford Hitchcock Jr., Harvard (FM-1)
- Warren, Yale (NYS-2)
- Williamson, Cornell (NYS-2)
- Henry, Brown (NYG-2)
- Phillips, Princeton (NYG-2)

=== Guards ===
- John H. Brown Jr., Navy (FM-1; NYS-1; NYG-1; WA-1)
- Howard Parker Talman, Rutgers (NYS-2; WA-1)
- Stan Pennock, Harvard (NYS-1; NYG-2)
- Hank Ketcham, Yale (FM-2; NYG-1)
- Alex Weyand, Army (FM-1)
- John Munns, Cornell (FM-2)
- Howe, Navy (NYS-2)
- John S. Pendleton, Yale (NYG-2)

=== Centers ===
- William Marting, Yale (FM-2; NYS-1; NYG-2; WA-1)
- Frederick Peterson, Colgate (NYS-2; NYG-1)
- William Garlow, Carlisle (FM-1)

== Key ==
- FM = Frank G. Menke
- NYS = New York Sun, selected by Walter S. Trumbull
- NYG = New York Globe
- WA = Walter G. Andrews, head coach of Princeton

== See also ==
- 1913 College Football All-America Team
