= Leland Hobbs =

US Army general (1892–1966)

Leland S. Hobbs
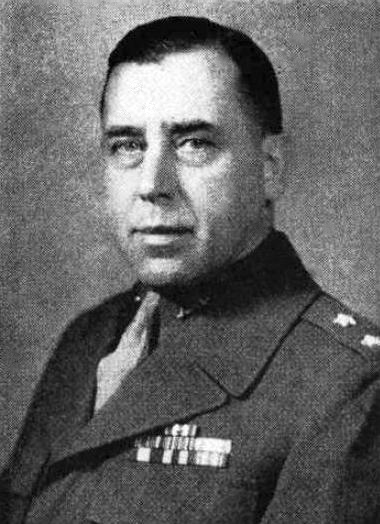
- Born: February 4, 1892; Gloucester, Massachusetts, United States
- Died: March 6, 1966 (aged 74); Walter Reed Army Hospital, Washington, D.C., United States
- Burial place: Arlington National Cemetery, Virginia, United States
- Military career
- Allegiance: United States
- Branch: United States Army
- Service years: 1915–1953
- Rank: Major General
- Service number: 0-3809
- Unit: Infantry Branch
- Commands: 3rd Battalion, 63rd Infantry Regiment; 3rd Infantry Regiment; 30th Infantry Division; III Corps; 2nd Armored Division; IX Corps
- Conflicts: Border War; World War I; World War II; Operation Overlord; Siegfried Line campaign; Battle of the Bulge; Occupation of Japan
- Awards: Army Distinguished Service Medal (2); Silver Star (3); Legion of Merit (2); Bronze Star (3)
- Other work: Banking executive

Major General Leland Stanford Hobbs (February 4, 1892 – March 6, 1966) was a decorated senior United States Army officer who commanded the 30th Infantry Division in Western Europe during World War II.

== Early life and military career ==
Hobbs was born on February 4, 1892, in Gloucester, Massachusetts and was raised in New Jersey. In June 1911 he attended the United States Military Academy (USMA) at West Point, New York.

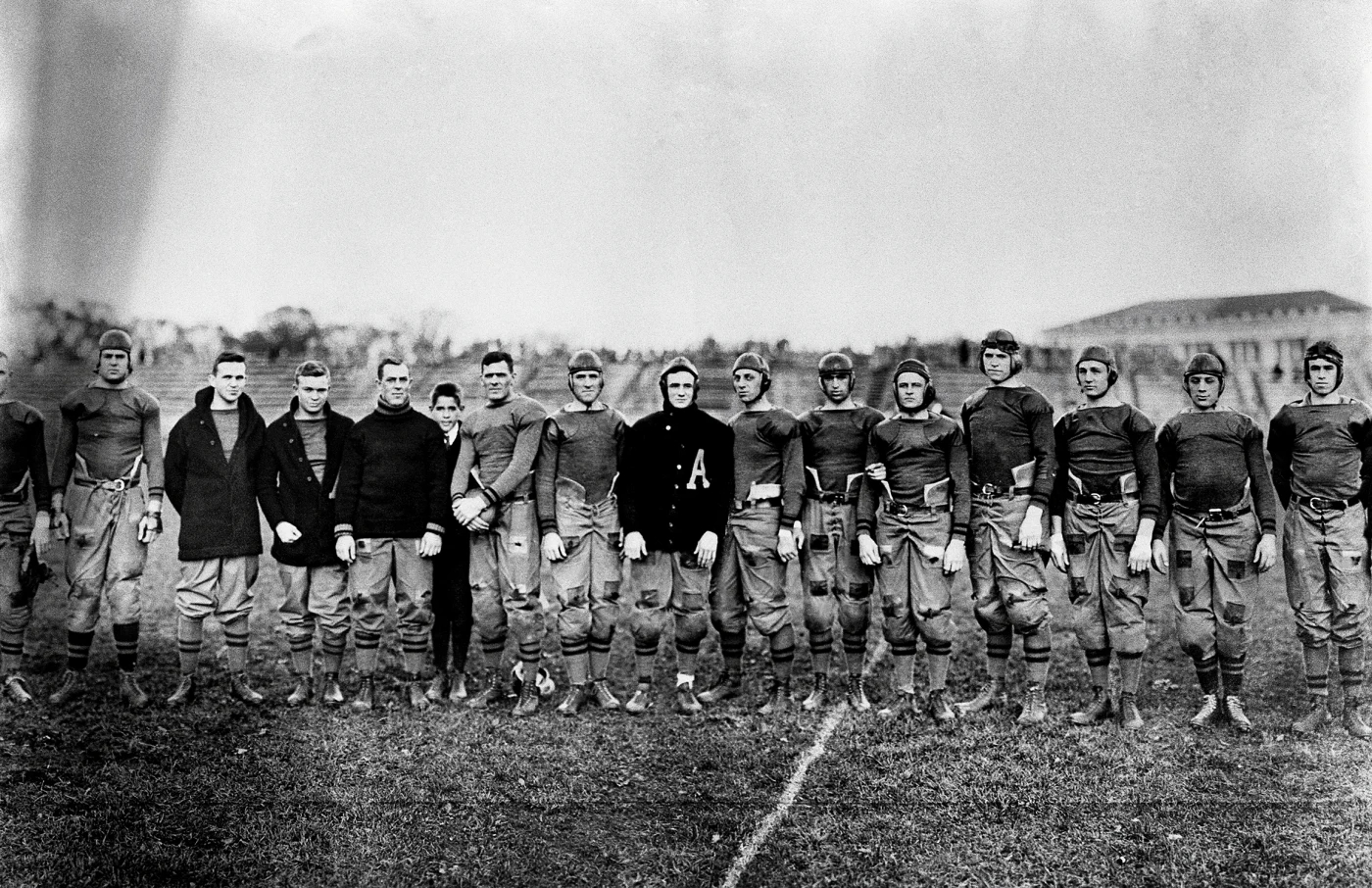
The 1912 West Point football team. Dwight D. Eisenhower is third from left. Louis Merillat is eighth from the left, in the A sweater. Omar Bradley is on the far right, to the left of Leland Hobbs.

He graduated from the academy almost exactly four years later in June 1915, as part of the West Point class of 1915, also known as "the class the stars fell on", graduating alongside Dwight D. Eisenhower, Omar Bradley, James Van Fleet, Henry Aurand, Roscoe B. Woodruff, Stafford LeRoy Irwin, John W. Leonard, Charles W. Ryder, Vernon Prichard and Paul J. Mueller. Like Hobbs, all of these men would later become general officers.

He was subsequently commissioned as a second lieutenant in the Infantry Branch of the United States Army and was assigned to the 12th Infantry Regiment, then stationed at Nogales, Arizona. He saw his first action there in the skirmishes with the Mexican bandits during the Pancho Villa Expedition.

He then saw service in California and Maryland, until, after the American entry into World War I, he was ordered to the Western Front with the 11th Infantry Division. However, the Armistice with Germany on November 11, 1918, was signed before the division saw any action. The division was ordered back to the United States and then deactivated at Camp Meade, Maryland. Hobbs briefly commanded the 3rd Battalion of the 63rd Infantry Regiment. He was then assigned to the USMA, where he served as an assistant instructor of tactics until 1924.

== Between the wars ==
In the interwar era, Hobbs had various assignments and also attended the U.S. Army Command and General Staff College at Fort Leavenworth, Kansas or Army War College in Carlisle, Pennsylvania.

In 1935, Hobbs was appointed quartermaster in the Fourth Corps area and in 1937, he was appointed Chief of Staff of the Third U.S. Army under the command of Lieutenant General Stanley D. Embick.

At the beginning of 1940, Hobbs was transferred to Washington, D.C., where he was appointed the executive officer of the 3rd Infantry Regiment. He served in this capacity for a brief time and after his promotion to the temporary rank of colonel, he was made the commander of the regiment.

== World War II ==
The Japanese attacked Pearl Harbor in December 1941 and brought the United States officially into World War II. At the time, Hobbs was serving as chief of staff of the Trinidad Base Command at Fort Read, a post he held until May 1942. The following month he was promoted to brigadier general and became the Assistant Division Commander (ADC) of the newly raised 80th Infantry Division, commanded by Major General Joseph D. Patch, the older brother of Alexander Patch, who would later become an army commander.

He was only there for a short time, however, as in September Hobbs was appointed as Commanding General (CG) of the 30th Infantry Division, a National Guard formation, then stationed at Camp Blanding, Florida. Hobbs would command the division for the rest of the war. His predecessor was Major General William Hood Simpson, who was appointed commander of XII Corps. In September he was promoted to major general. In January 1943 Brigadier General William Kelly Harrison Jr. became his new ADC and he retained this position until the end of the war.

In November 1943, Hobbs was transferred, together with his division, to Camp Atterbury, Indiana, where it continued in training for its deploying within European Theater of Operations (ETO). The 30th Infantry Division arrived in England on February 22, 1944, and trained until June of that year. Major General Hobbs landed in Normandy, France on Omaha Beach with his division on June 11, five days after the initial D-Day landings. The 30th Division fought in the Battle of Normandy and secured the Vire-et-Taute Canal, crossed the Vire River, July 7, and, beginning on July 25 spearheaded the St. Lô break-through, Operation Cobra.

Hobbs led the 30th Infantry Division in the Battle of Normandy, Mortain counteroffensive, the Battle of the Bulge, the Battle of Aachen and for the rest of the war until the end of World War II in Europe in May 1945. In September 1945 he was succeeded in command of the 30th Division, which he had by now commanded for three years, by Major General Albert C. Smith. Major General Hobbs was highly decorated for his leadership of the 30th Division during World War II (see his ribbon bar below).

== Postwar ==
After the war Hobbs was transferred back to the United States, where he was appointed commanding general of Fort Dix, New Jersey and acting commanding general of Second Service Command in February 1946. He served in this capacity until October 1946, when he was assigned to the 2nd Armored Division as its commanding general, succeeding his West Point classmate, Major General John W. Leonard.

In August 1947, he was transferred to Fort McPherson, Georgia, where he was appointed the Deputy Commanding General of the Third United States Army, under the command of Lieutenant General Alvan C. Gillem.

At the beginning of 1949, he was transferred to Japan, where he took command of IX Corps at Camp Sendai. Hobbs performed regular occupation duties with his unit until August 1950, when he was replaced by General Frank W. Milburn.

His last military assignment was as Deputy Commanding General of the First Army, stationed at Fort Jay, Governors Island, New York, under the command of Lieutenant General Willis D. Crittenberger. He retired from the army in 1953 and became vice president of the Colonial Trust Bank in New York City.

Major General Leland Stanford Hobbs died on March 6, 1966, at the age of 74, at Walter Reed Army Hospital in Washington, D.C. He was buried at Arlington National Cemetery in Virginia. His wife Lucy Davis Hobbs (1892–1980) was also buried there.

== Decorations ==
Major General Hobbs's ribbon bar:

1st Row	Army Distinguished Service Medal with Oak Leaf Cluster		Silver Star with two Oak Leaf Clusters	
2nd Row	Legion of Merit	Bronze Star Medal with two Oak Leaf Clusters	Army Commendation Medal	Mexican Service Medal
3rd Row	World War I Victory Medal	American Defense Service Medal with Base Clasp	American Campaign Medal	European–African–Middle Eastern Campaign Medal with five service stars
4th Row	World War II Victory Medal	Army of Occupation Medal	National Defense Service Medal	Officer of the Legion of Honor (France)
5th Row	French Croix de guerre 1939–1945 with Palm	Commander of the Order of Orange-Nassau	Belgian Croix de Guerre 1940–1945 with Palm	Order of the Red Banner (Union of Soviet Socialist Republics)

== Gallery ==
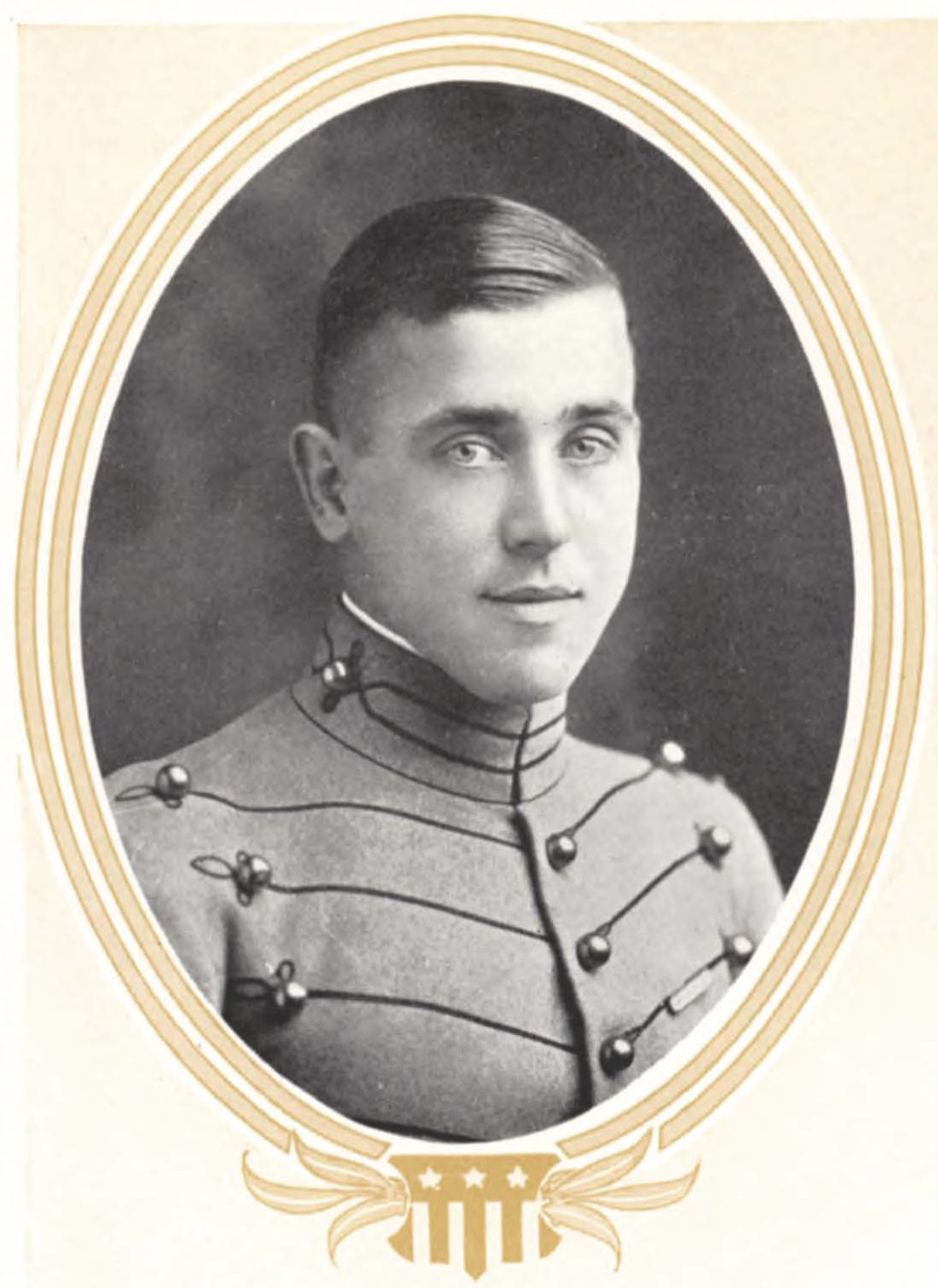
Leland S. Hobbs as a West Point cadet.

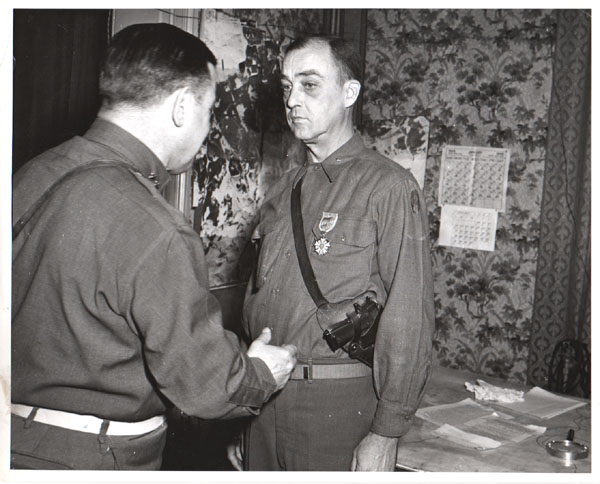
Major General Leland S. Hobbs presents the Legion Of Merit to Brigadier General James M. Lewis, commander of the 30th Division Artillery, for his meritorious service from July 28 to October 13, 1944.

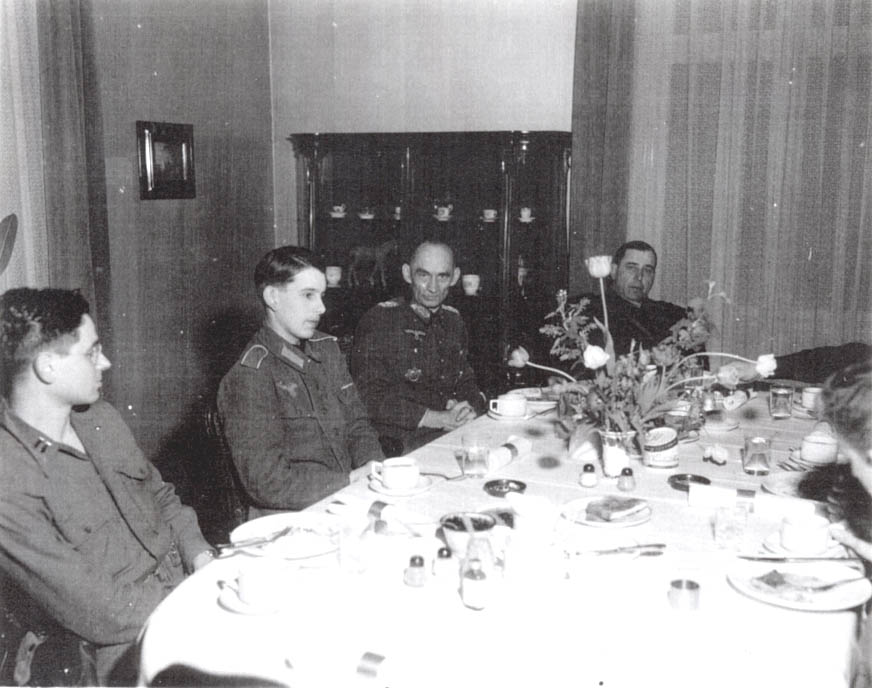
German propaganda aide to Joseph Goebbels, General Kurt Dittmar (second from the right), his son Berend (third from the right) and Major General Leland S. Hobbs (extreme right) on April 25, 1945, in Magdeburg.

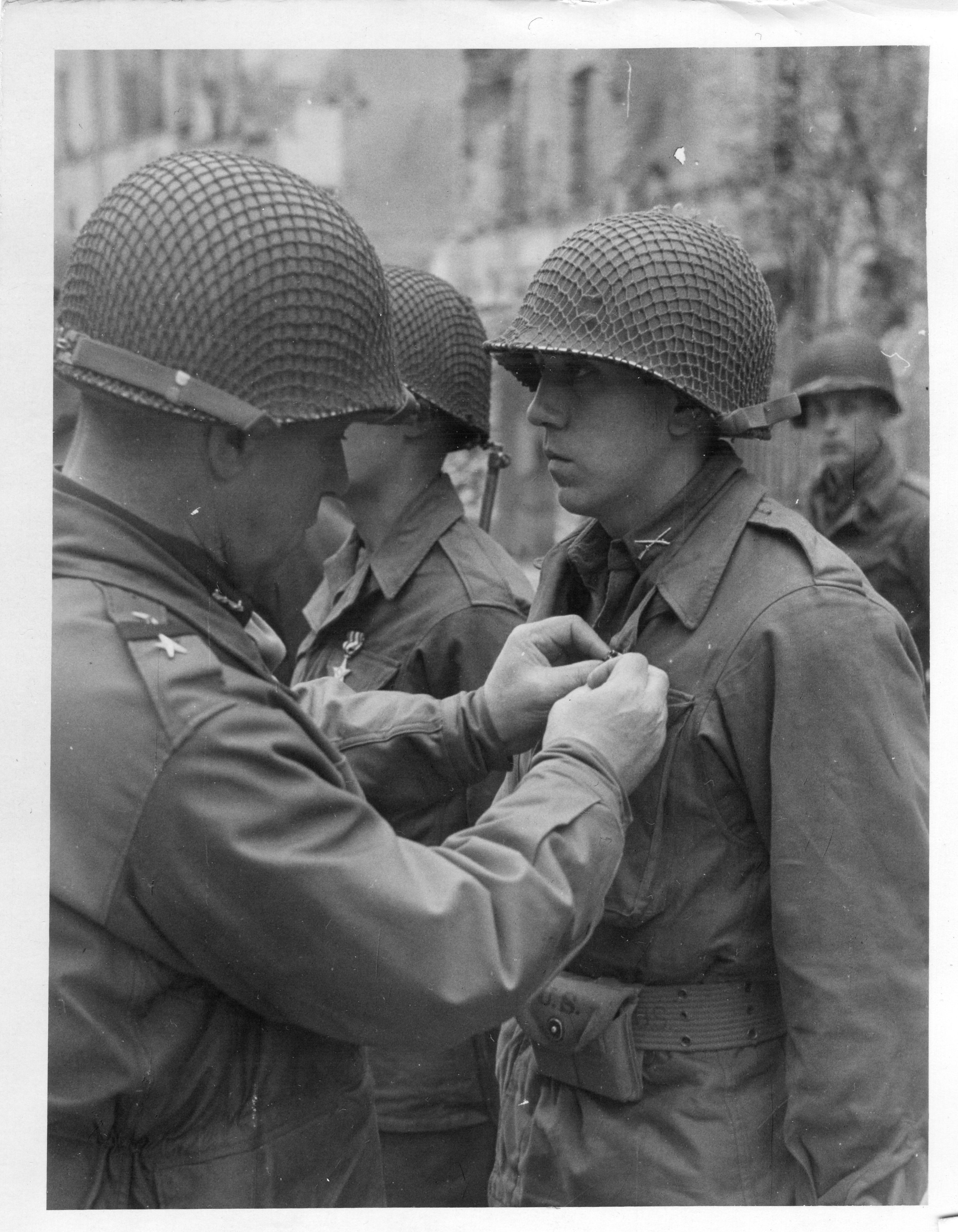
Major General Leland Hobbs presents the Silver Star to Second Lieutenant Robert F. Ackerman of Springfield, Massachusetts, May 2, 1945

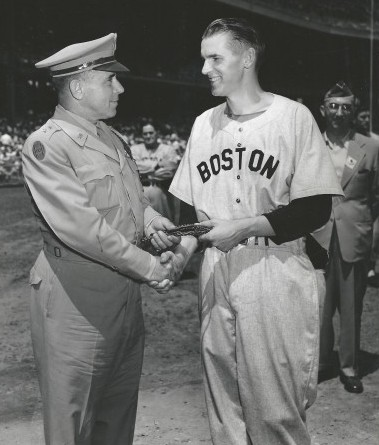
Earl Johnson, who served with the 30th Infantry Division, is presented with the Belgian Citation, for his service in Europe during World War II, by Major General Leland Hobbs.

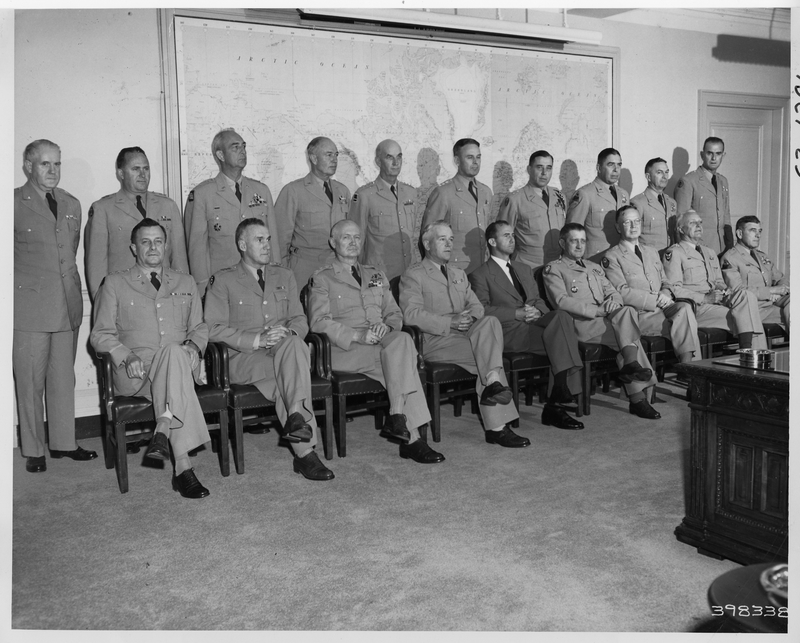
Army commanders in the United States and certain overseas commanders meet with Secretary of the Army Frank Pace and General J. Lawton Collins, Army Chief of Staff, in the Pentagon in routine sessions, June 5, 1952. Major General Leland Hobbs is stood fourth from the right, between Lieutenant General Maxwell D. Taylor (left) and Major General Albert C. Smith (right).

Military offices
Preceded by William H. Simpson	Commanding General 30th Infantry Division; 1942–1945	Succeeded by Albert C. Smith
Preceded by Ira T. Wyche	Commanding General III Corps; May–October 1946	Succeeded by Post deactivated
Preceded by John W. Leonard	Commanding General 2nd Armored Division; 1946–1947	Succeeded by James G. Christiansen
Preceded by Charles W. Ryder	Commanding General IX Corps; 1949–1950	Succeeded by Frank W. Milburn
