= Albert C. Smith (United States Army officer) =

United States Army general (1894–1974)

Albert Cowper Smith
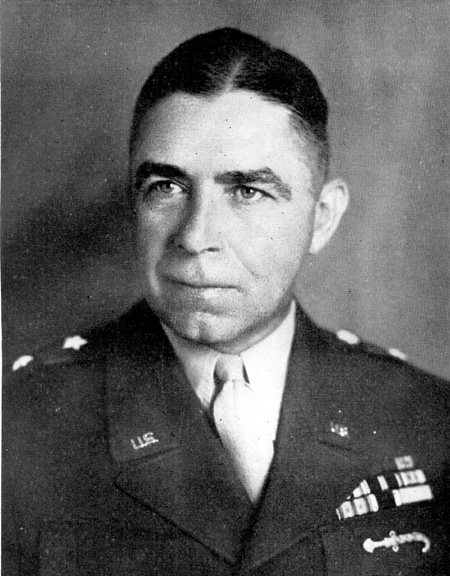
- Born: June 5, 1894; Warrenton, Virginia, United States
- Died: January 24, 1974 (aged 79); Washington, D.C., United States
- Burial place: Arlington National Cemetery, Virginia, United States
- Military career
- Allegiance: United States
- Branch: United States Army
- Service years: 1917–1955
- Rank: Major general
- Service number: O-5265
- Unit: Cavalry Branch
- Commands: Fifth United States Army; 2nd Armored Division; 24th Infantry Division; 30th Infantry Division; 14th Armored Division
- Conflicts: World War I; Meuse-Argonne offensive; World War II; Rhineland Campaign; Central European Campaign
- Awards: Army Distinguished Service Medal; Silver Star; Bronze Star Medal; Army Commendation Medal

Major General Albert Cowper Smith (June 5, 1894 – January 24, 1974) was an officer in the United States Army. He is most noted for his service as Commanding General of the 14th Armored Division during the later part of World War II. Smith and his division liberated Prisoner-of-war camps, Oflag XIII-B and Stalag VII-A in April 1945.

Following the war, Smith held several important assignments including several divisional commands or as acting Commanding General of the Fifth United States Army and completed his career as Chief of the Office of Military History in September 1955.

== Early years ==
Albert Cowper Smith was born on June 5, 1894, in Warrenton, Virginia, as the son of Eugene Albert and Blanch Baker Smith. Following his graduation from the Gordon Military Institute in Barnesville, Georgia, he sought for an appointment to the United States Military Academy at West Point, New York, but this did not materialise, so he entered the Virginia Polytechnic Institute in Blacksburg, Virginia, instead. Smith completed almost three years there and finally received an appointment to West Point in June 1913. He graduated, 57th in a class of 139, with a bachelor of Science degree on April 20, 1917, shortly following the American entry into World War I, and was commissioned a second lieutenant in the Cavalry Branch of the United States Army. Smith completed his basic training at Fort Sam Houston, Texas, while attached to 3rd Cavalry Regiment and was promoted to the permanent rank of first lieutenant on May 15, 1917, and to the temporary rank of captain on August 5 that year. He embarked for France in October 1917 and his regiment was tasked with the operation of three major horse remount depots. The three squadrons were charged with the purchase of horses, mules and forage, the care, conditioning, and training of remounts before issue, and the distribution and issue of remounts to the American Expeditionary Forces (AEF).

Smith was later transferred to the headquarters of the newly formed U.S. First Army, under General John J. Pershing (who also simultaneously commanded the entire AEF), and became Secretary of the General Staff, VII Corps under Major generals Omar Bundy and William G. Haan. While in this capacity, he took part in the Meuse-Argonne offensive in the final weeks of the war and, following the armistice with Germany, Smith participated in the occupation of the Rhineland, while stationed at the corps headquarters in the town of Wittlich.

He was later ordered to Montabaur and assumed duty as aide-de-camp to the commanding general, 1st Infantry Division, Edward F. McGlachlin. Smith remained in this capacity until September 1919, when he was ordered back to the United States.

== Interwar period ==
Upon his return stateside, Smith was reverted to his permanent rank of first lieutenant and attached to the 14th Cavalry Regiment at Fort Sam Houston, Texas. He remained with that outfit until November that year and joined the headquarters of Southern Army Department for duty in the Plans and Training Division. While in this capacity, Smith was promoted again to Captain on April 13, 1920, and finally left this assignment in January 1921 in order to rejoin 14th Cavalry at Fort Des Moines, Iowa.

After several months in Iowa, Smith was transferred to the staff of United States Military Academy at West Point, New York, and served as an instructor in the department of natural and experimental philosophy until September 1926, when he entered the Army Cavalry School at Fort Riley, Kansas. He graduated in June 1927 and joined 13th Cavalry Regiment located at Fort Riley. His tenure with 13th Cavalry lasted until April 1929, when he returned to the United States Military Academy at West Point as assistant professor in the department of natural and experimental philosophy. Smith was promoted to major on October 1, 1932.

In August 1934, Smith entered the Army Command and General Staff School at Fort Leavenworth, Kansas, and graduated from the two-year course in June 1936. He then remained at the school as an instructor until July 1940. During that period, he witnessed the development of Armoured warfare doctrine in the United States Army and gradual mechanization of cavalry units.

His old 13th Cavalry Regiment was mechanized in mid-June 1940, redesignated 13th Armored Regiment and Smith joined him as newly promoted lieutenant colonel and Regimental Intelligence officer. He served in this capacity under Colonel Raymond E. McQuillin until November that year and then assumed duty as plans and training officer of the Armored Force Replacement Training Center at Fort Knox, Kentucky.

== World War II ==
In April 1941, Smith was transferred to Pine Camp, New York and joined the headquarters of newly activated 4th Armored Division under Major General John S. Wood as Assistant Chief of Staff for Operations (G-3). Smith received the temporary rank of colonel on 11 December, 1941 and in July 1942, Smith became the commanding officer of the 4th Armored Division’s 37th Armored Regiment.

Smith was promoted to the temporary rank of brigadier general on September 10, 1942, and joined the recently activated 14th Armored Division (as the assistant division commander), commanded by Major General Vernon Prichard, at Camp Chaffee, Arkansas. While there, he was appointed Commander of Divisional Combat command A, a combined brigade size unit of tanks, armored infantry, armored field artillery battalions and engineer units.

He commanded his combat command during an intensive period of training and then during the Tennessee maneuvers from November 1943 until January 1944. In September 1944 Smith succeeded Major General Prichard, who was sent to command the 1st Armored Division on the Italian front, in command of the division and embarked for the European Theater (ETO) by mid-October 1944. The 14th Armored Division landed at Marseille in southern France on October 29 and within two weeks some of its elements were ordered to the defensive positions along the Franco-Italian frontier.

In mid-November 1944, the division took part in the drive through the Vosges Mountains and participated in the heavy combats at Gertwiller, Benfeld, and Barr. Smith and his division subsequently took part in the Operation Nordwind, major German offensive in Rhineland-Palatinate, Alsace and Lorraine. The major fighting between January 1 and 8 occurred in the Vosges Mountains and two combat commands of the division were in almost continuous action against the German thrusts. With the failure of his attack in the Vosges, the enemy attempted to break through to Hagenau and threaten Strasbourg and the Saverne Gap by attacks at Hatten and Rittershoffen, two small villages located side by side on the Alsatian Plain. However, this, the strongest attack of Operation Nordwind, was halted by the 14th Armored Division in the fierce defensive Battle of Hatten-Rittershoffen which ranged from January 9 to 21, 1945.

With advancement into the heart of Germany, Smith and his division liberated Oflag XIII-B and Stalag XIII-C, Prisoner-of-war camps at Hammelburg, Bavaria on April 6, 1945, and another POW camp, Stalag VII-A near Moosburg on April 29. On May 2 and 3, the 14th Armored liberated several sub-camps of the Dachau concentration camp. Upon entering the towns of Mühldorf and Ampfing, units of the division discovered three large forced labor camps containing thousands of Polish and Soviet civilians. Units also liberated two additional camps nearby holding Jewish prisoners.

Smith was responsible for the liberation of some 200,000 Allied prisoners of war from German prison camps. Among those liberated were approximately 20,000 American soldiers, sailors and airmen, as well as an estimated 40,000 troops from Great Britain and the Commonwealth.

For his service during World War II, Smith was decorated with the Army Distinguished Service Medal, Silver Star, Bronze Star Medal or Army Commendation Medal. He was also decorated with Legion of Honour and Croix de Guerre with Palm by the Government of France.

== Postwar service ==
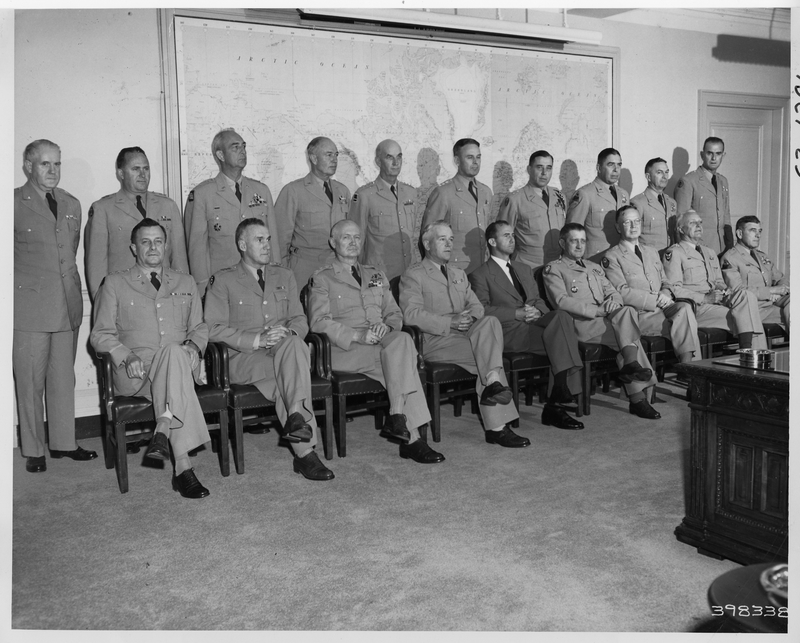
Army commanders in the United States and certain overseas commanders meet with Secretary of the Army Frank Pace and General J. Lawton Collins, Army Chief of Staff, in the Pentagon in routine sessions, June 5, 1952. Major General Albert C. Smith is stood third from the right, between Major General Leland Hobbs (left) and Major General William A. Beiderlinden (right).

Following the War, the 14th Armored Division was stationed in Germany, where it participated in the occupation duty until the beginning of August 1945, when it was ordered back to the United States for deactivation. The 14th Armored was deactivated at Camp Patrick Henry, Virginia, on September 16, 1945, and Smith was ordered to Fort Jackson, South Carolina, and assumed command of 30th Infantry Division.

Smith supervised the demobilization of the troops until December 1945, when 30th Division was deactivated and he was reverted to his peacetime rank of colonel ordered to Washington, D.C., for duty as President of War Department Board for Selection of Regular Army Officers. While in this capacity, he was shortly thereafter promoted again to Brigadier general and ordered to the Philippines, where he assumed duty as Assistant Division Commander, 86th Infantry Division.

While in this capacity, Smith served as deputy to Major General Harry Hazlett and participated in the repatriation of Japanese prisoners of war on Leyte until February 1947. He was subsequently ordered to Japan and joined the headquarters of 24th Infantry Division under Major General James A. Lester as assistant division commander. The division was stationed on Kyushu and maintained order during the occupation duties.

Smith was promoted again to major general on January 24, 1948, and succeeded general Lester as division commander. He departed the division by the end of April 1949 and returned to the United States for duty as commanding general of 2nd Armored Division at Fort Hood, Texas. Following the outbreak of the Korean War, Smith's division was tasked with the training of replacement units for combat.

He was sent to Fort Sam Houston, Texas, in November 1950 and assumed duty as Deputy Commander, Fifth United States Army under Lieutenant General Stephen J. Chamberlin. Upon the retirement of general Chamberlin in December 1951, Smith assumed his duties and served as Acting general of Fifth Army until July 1952, when new commanding general, William B. Kean relieved him.

Smith then resumed his duties as deputy commander and remained in that capacity until February 1953, when he was ordered to Washington, D.C., for duty as Chief of the Office of Military History. He retired on September 30, 1955, after 38 years of active service.

== Death ==
Following his retirement, Smith settled in Washington, D.C., and died of kidney failure at Walter Reed Army Medical Center on January 24, 1974, aged 79. He was buried with full military honors at Arlington National Cemetery, Virginia. His wife, Mary Gorman Smith (1897–1987) is buried beside him. They had two sons: Albert Jr. and Robert (Colonel, USMA 1944).

== Decorations ==
Here is Major general Smith's ribbon bar:

1st Row	Army Distinguished Service Medal			Silver Star
2nd Row	Bronze Star Medal	Army Commendation Medal	World War I Victory Medal with two Battle Clasps	Army of Occupation of Germany Medal
3rd Row	American Defense Service Medal	American Campaign Medal	European-African-Middle Eastern Campaign Medal with three 3/16 inch service stars	World War II Victory Medal
4th Row	Army of Occupation Medal	National Defense Service Medal	Commander of the Legion of Honor (France)	French Croix de guerre 1939-1945 with Palm

Military offices
Preceded by Leland Hobbs	Commanding General 30th Infantry Division; September 1945 – December 1945	Succeeded by Post deactivated
Preceded by Vernon Prichard	Commanding General 14th Armored Division; 1944 – 1945	Succeeded by Post deactivated
