= 1913 All-America college football team =

Official list of the best college football players of 1913

1913 official All-America selectors

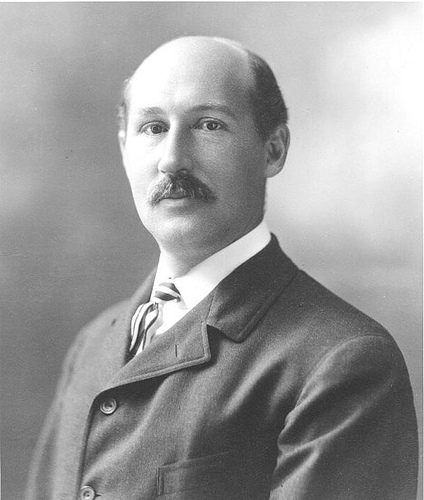
Walter Camp

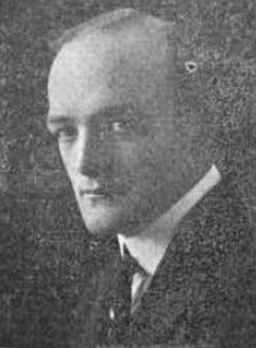
Frank G. Menke

The 1913 All-America college football team is composed of college football players who were selected as All-Americans for the 1913 college football season. The only two selectors who have been recognized as "official" selectors by the National Collegiate Athletic Association (NCAA) for the 1913 season are Walter Camp and the International News Service (INS). Camp's All-America Team was published in Collier's Weekly. The INS was founded in 1909 by William Randolph Hearst, and its sports editor Frank G. Menke selected the INS All-America team. Other sports writers, newspapers, coaches selecting All-America teams in 1913 included Harper's Weekly, Fielding H. Yost, and Parke H. Davis.

== Consensus All-Americans ==
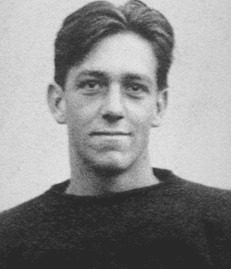
Paul Des Jardien of Chicago

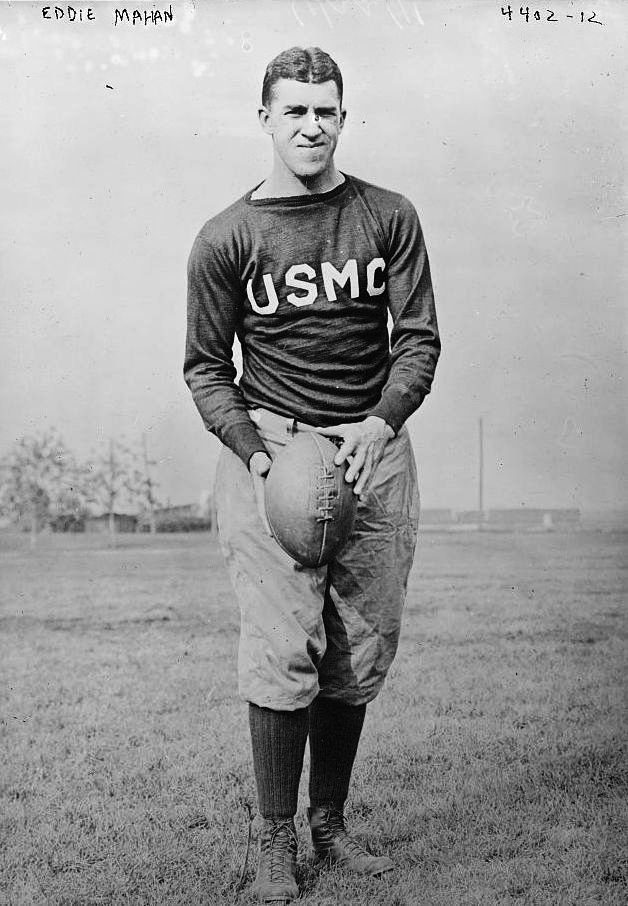
Eddie Mahan of Harvard

In its official record book, the NCAA designates players who were selected by either Camp or INS as "consensus" All-Americans. Using this criterion, the NCAA recognizes 15 as "consensus" All-Americans for the 1913 season. The consensus players are identified in bold on the main list below ("All-Americans of 1913"). Camp and INS unanimously selected the following seven players as All-Americans:

- Charles Brickley, fullback for Harvard. Brickley later became a player and coach in the early years of professional football. He was the coach of the New York Brickley Giants in the first year of play in the National Football League. In 1928, he was convicted on four counts of larceny and bucketing orders from customers of his stock brokerage firm.
- John "Babe" Brown, guard for Navy. Brown was inducted into the College Football Hall of Fame in 1951 as part of the first group of inductees. During World War II, Admiral John Brown oversaw submarine operations in the South Pacific. He later served as athletics director at the United States Naval Academy.
- James Craig, halfback for Michigan. Craig was also one of the best hurdlers in the country, breaking the world indoor record in the high hurdles in 1911 and winning the intercollegiate championship in the low hurdles in 1912. His older brother, Ralph Craig, won gold medals in the 100 and 200-meter events at the 1912 Olympics.
- Paul Des Jardien, center for Chicago. At six feet, five inches in height, but weighing only 190 pounds, Des Jardien was nicknamed "Shorty." He led the 1913 Chicago Maroons football team to an undefeated 7–0 record and was inducted into the College Football Hall of Fame in 1955. Des Jardien was a multi-sport star who also briefly played professional baseball as a pitcher for the Cleveland Indians in 1916.
- Robert Hogsett, end for Dartmouth. Hogsett was the captain of the 1913 Dartmouth Big Green football team that compiled a 7–1–0 record and outscored opponents 218 to 79, including victories over Princeton and Penn.
- Eddie Mahan, halfback for Harvard. Mahan was selected as a first-team All-American three consecutive years from 1913 to 1915. He was widely regarded as one of the greatest players in the first 50 years of the sport and was named by Jim Thorpe as the greatest football player of all time. In 1951, Mahan was elected to the College Football Hall of Fame as part of the first group of inductees.
- Louis A. Merrilat, end for Army. Merrilat was a first-team All-American in both 1913 and 1914. He was severely wounded by airplane machine gun fire during World War I, but went on to play in the NFL as a 33-year-old rookie in 1925. He later became a soldier of fortune, training Iran's Persian Guard, working with the Chinese Army in the 1930s, and serving in the French Foreign Legion.

== All-Americans of 1913 ==
=== Ends ===
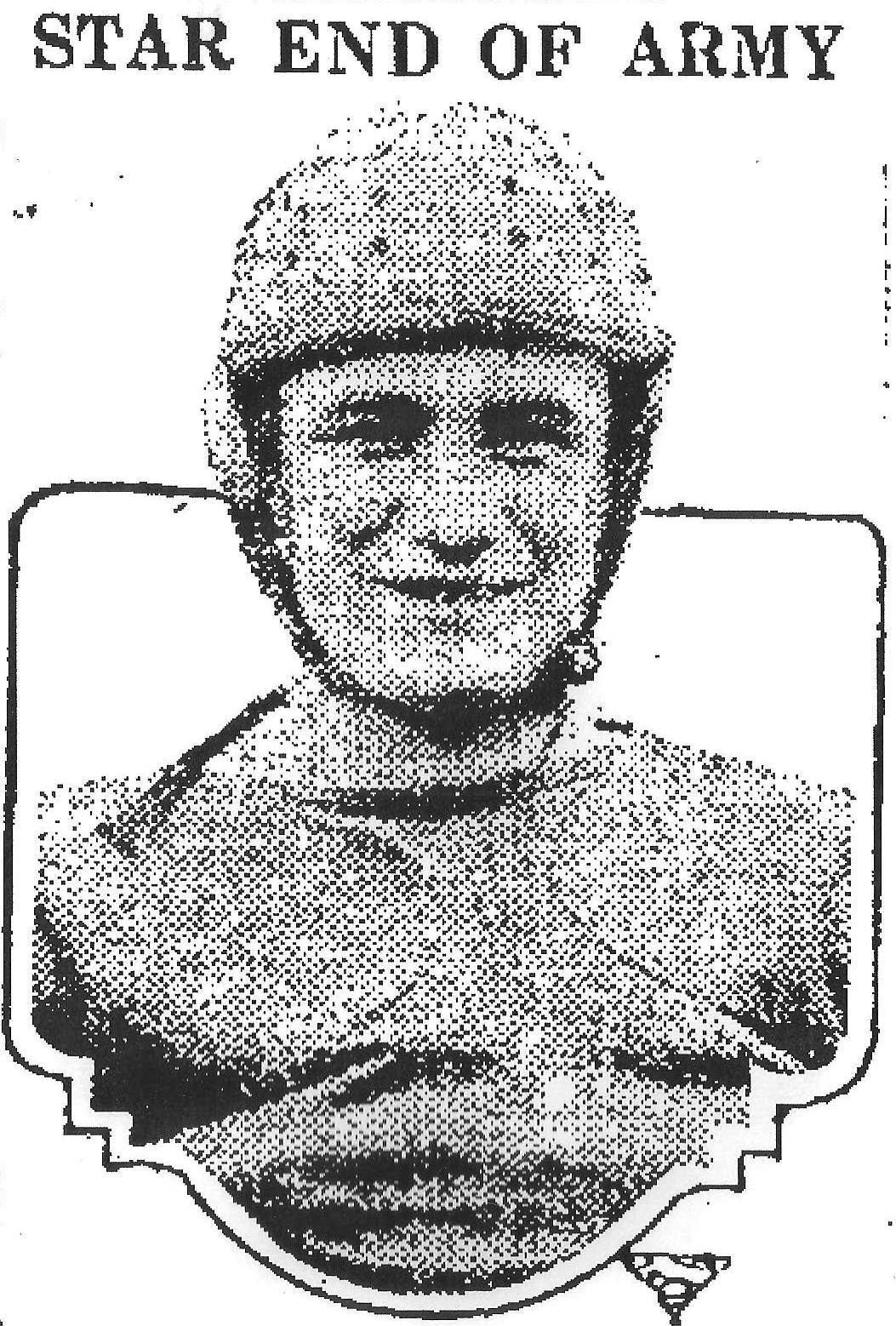
Louis Merrillat of Army

- **Robert Hogsett**, Dartmouth (WC–1; INS-1; MFP-2; SBH-1; TET-1)
- **Louis A. Merrilat**, Army (WC–1; INS-1; PHD-1; SBH-1; TET-1)
- W. H. Fritz, Cornell (WC–2; FY-1)
- Huntington Hardwick, Harvard (College Football Hall of Fame) (WC–2)
- Lorin Solon, Minnesota (WC–3; INS-2; MFP-1; FY-1)
- Knute Rockne, Notre Dame (College Football Hall of Fame) (WC–3; HW-2; MFP-2)
- Huntington, Chicago (INS-2)
- Benjamin F. Avery, Yale (MFP-1; TT-1)
- Hube Wagner, Pitt (PHD-1; TT-2)
- Francis Joseph O'Brien, Harvard (TT-1)
- K. P. Gilchrist, Navy (TT-2)

=== Tackles ===
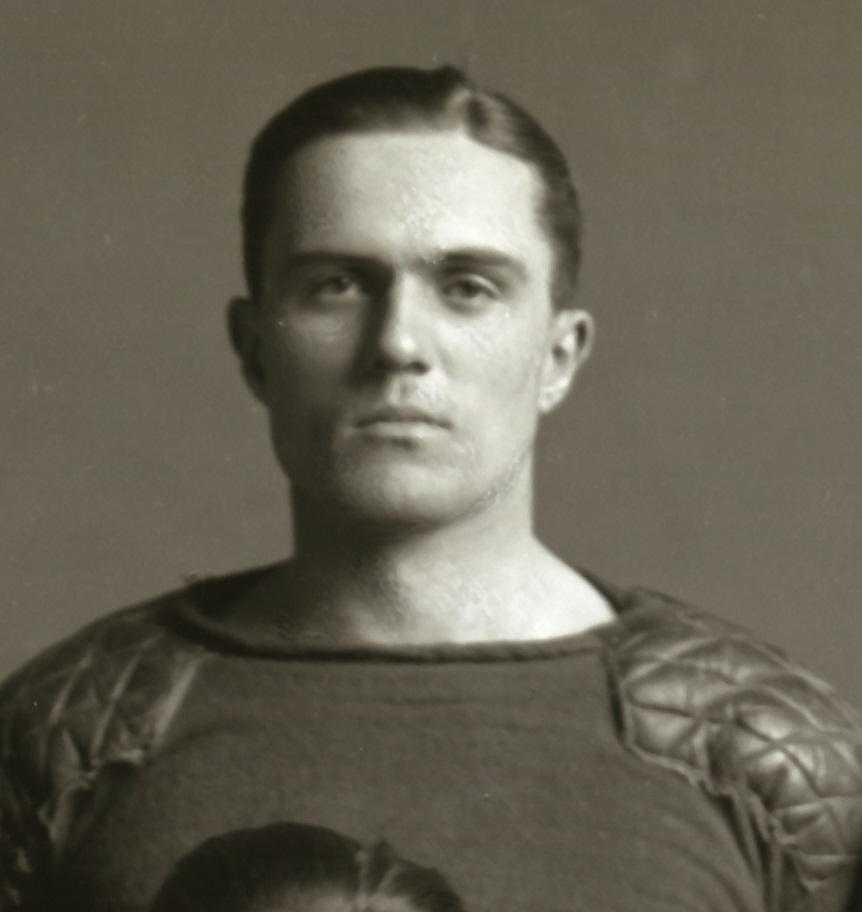
Miller Pontius of Michigan

- **Miller Pontius**, Michigan (INS-1; MFP-2; FY-1; PHD-1; TT-1)
- **Harold Ballin**, Princeton (College Football Hall of Fame) (WC–1; INS-2; FY-1; PHD-1; TT-1; SBH-1; TET-1)
- **Bud Talbott**, Yale (WC–1; MFP-2; TET-1)
- **Harvey Hitchcock**, Harvard (INS-1)
- Bob Butler, Wisconsin (WC–2; HW-1; MFP-1; SBH-1; TT-2)
- Alex Weyand, Army (College Football Hall of Fame) (WC–2)
- Vic Halligan, Nebraska (WC–3)
- Robert Treat Paine Storer, Harvard (WC–3; INS-2; MFP-1; TT-2)

=== Guards ===
- **John Brown**, Navy (College Football Hall of Fame) (WC-1; INS-1; MFP-1; PHD-1; TT-1; SBH-1; TET-1)
- **Stan Pennock**, Harvard (College Football Hall of Fame) (WC–1; MFP-2; FY-1; TT-1; TET-1)
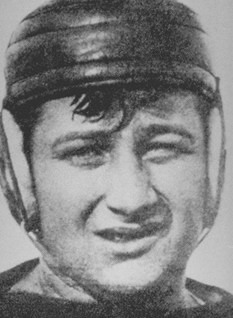
  Stan Pennock of Harvard.
- **Ray Keeler**, Wisconsin (INS-1; MFP-2)
- Elmer Busch, Carlisle (WC–2)
- Hank Ketcham, Yale (College Football Hall of Fame) (WC–2; INS-2)
- Howard Parker Talman, Rutgers (WC–3; PHD-1)
- Alex Weyand, Army (College Football Hall of Fame)(WC–3; INS-2)
- John S. Pendleton, Yale (MFP-1)
- Jimmie Munns, Cornell (WC-3 [tackle]; FY–1; TT-2; SBH-1)
- Albert Journeay, Penn (TT-2)

=== Centers ===
- **Paul Des Jardien**, Chicago (College Football Hall of Fame) (WC–1; HW-1; INS-1; TT-2)
- William Marting, Yale (WC–2; MFP-2; PHD-1)
- George C. Paterson, Michigan (WC–3; MFP-1)
- Pete Garlow, Carlisle (INS-2; SBH-1)
- Walter Simpson, Penn (FY–1)
- Hank Ketcham, Yale (College Football Hall of Fame) (TT-1; TET-1)

=== Quarterbacks ===
- **Ellery Huntington, Jr.**, Colgate (College Football Hall of Fame) (WC–1; PHD-1)
- **Gus Dorais**, Notre Dame (College Football Hall of Fame) (HW-2; INS-1; MFP-1; TT-1; SBH-1; TET-1)
- Tommy Hughitt, Michigan (MFP-2; FY-1)
- Alexander D. Wilson, Yale (WC–2; TT-2)
- Shorty Miller, Penn State (WC–3)
- Paul Russell, Chicago (HW-1; INS-2)
- Vernon Prichard, Army (HW-2)

=== Halfbacks ===
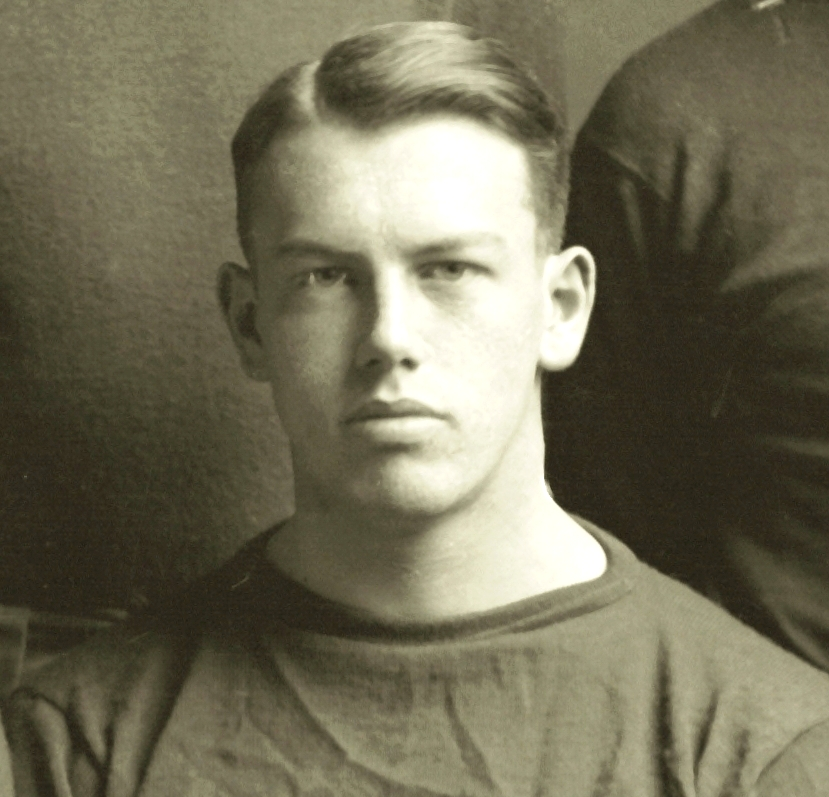
James Craig of Michigan

- **James B. Craig**, Michigan (WC–1; HW-1; INS-1; MFP-1; FY-1; TT-1; SBH-1; TET-1)
- **Eddie Mahan**, Harvard (College Football Hall of Fame) (WC-1 [fb]; INS–1; MFP-1; TT-2; SBH-1 [fb]; TET-1)
- Johnny Spiegel, Washington & Jefferson (WC–2)
- Joe Guyon, Carlisle (College Football Hall of Fame) (WC–2; INS-2; PHD-1; TT-1)
- Hobey Baker, Princeton (College Football Hall of Fame) (WC–3; MFP-2)
- Nelson Norgren, Chicago (WC–3; INS-2; MFP-2; FY-1)
- Bob McWhorter, Georgia (College Football Hall of Fame) (PHD-1)
- Elmer Oliphant, Purdue (College Football Hall of Fame) (TT-2)

=== Fullbacks ===
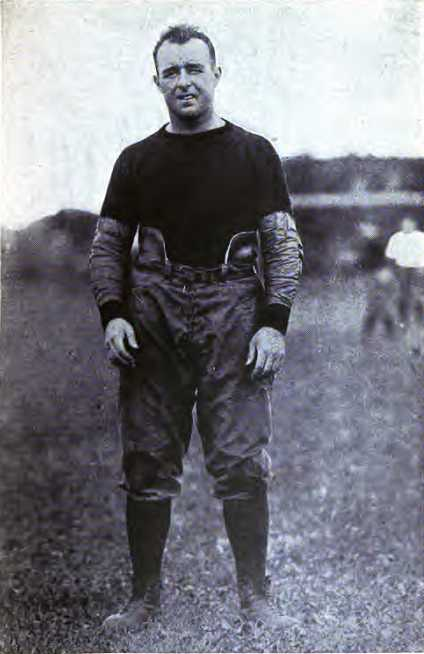
Charles Brickley of Harvard

- **Charles Brickley**, Harvard (WC-1 [hb]; INS–1; MFP-1; FY-1; PHD-1; TT-1; SBH-1 [hb]; TET-1)
- Ray Eichenlaub, Notre Dame (College Football Hall of Fame) (WC–2; INS-2; MFP-2; TT-2)
- Lawrence Whitney, Dartmouth (WC–3)
- George E. Julian, Michigan State (MFP–2)

=== Key ===
NCAA recognized selectors for 1913

- WC = Collier's Weekly as selected by Walter Camp
- INS = Frank G. Menke, sporting editor of the International News Service

Other selectors

- HW = Harper's Weekly, as selected by football critic Herman Reed
- MFP = Milwaukee Free Press
- FY = Fielding H. Yost, head coach at the University of Michigan
- PHD = Parke H. Davis, Princeton's representative on the football rules committee, in the New York Herald
- TT = Tom Thorp, former captain of Columbia football team and head football coach at Fordham University
- SBH = S. B. Hunt in the Newark Sunday Call
- TET = Trenton Evening-Times, selected by a "well known gridiron critic whose name is withheld by special request"

Bold = Consensus All-American

- 1 – First-team selection
- 2 – Second-team selection
- 3 – Third-team selection

== See also ==
- 1913 All-Southern college football team
- 1913 All-Western college football team
