= Robert Hogsett =

American football player (c. 1892–1953)

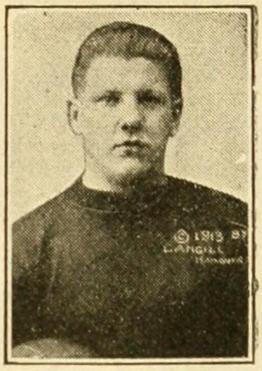

Profile
- Position: End

Personal information
- Born: c. 1892
- Died: August 8, 1953 (aged 61); Somerville, New Jersey, U.S.
- Listed height: 5 ft 6 in (1.68 m)
- Listed weight: 156 lb (71 kg)

Career information
- College: Dartmouth (1911–1913)

Awards and highlights
- Consensus All-American (1913)

Robert N. Hogsett (c. 1892 – August 8, 1953) was an American football player. He played college football for the Dartmouth Big Green football team from 1911 to 1913 and was the captain of the 1913 Dartmouth team. He was a consensus All-American football player in 1913, receiving first-team honors from both Walter Camp and the International News Service.

Hogsett was the son of Thomas H. Hogsett, a corporate lawyer in Cleveland, Ohio, and Rebecca (Jones) Hogsett. Hogsett attended University School in Cleveland before enrolling at Dartmouth College. He was five feet, six inches tall, and weighed 156 pounds while playing football at Dartmouth. Hogsett died unexpectedly, aged 61, at his home in Somerville, New Jersey.
