= Alex Weyand =

American football player

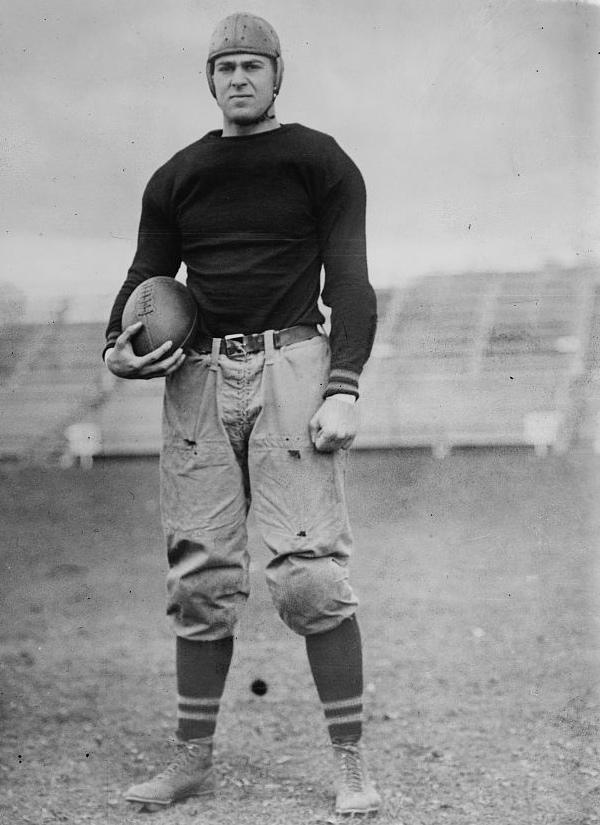
- Weyand on November 13, 1915

Army Cadets
- Position: Tackle

Personal information
- Born: January 10, 1892; Jersey City, New Jersey, U.S.
- Died: May 10, 1982 (aged 90); North Bellmore, New York, U.S.

Career information
- College: Army (1913–1915)

Awards and highlights
- National Champion (1914); 2× Second-team All-American (1913, 1914); Third-team All-American (1915)

Alexander Mathias "Babe" Weyand (January 10, 1892 – May 10, 1982) was an American football player, Olympian, Army officer and sports historian. He was elected to the College Football Hall of Fame in 1974.

== Biography ==
Weyand was born on January 10, 1892, to Alexander Nicholas Weyand and Mary C. Lieberman in Jersey City, New Jersey. Weyand played high school football at Jersey City High School (since renamed William L. Dickinson High School), where he did not earn a letter in any sport, as he chose to place priority on his education.

=== College career ===
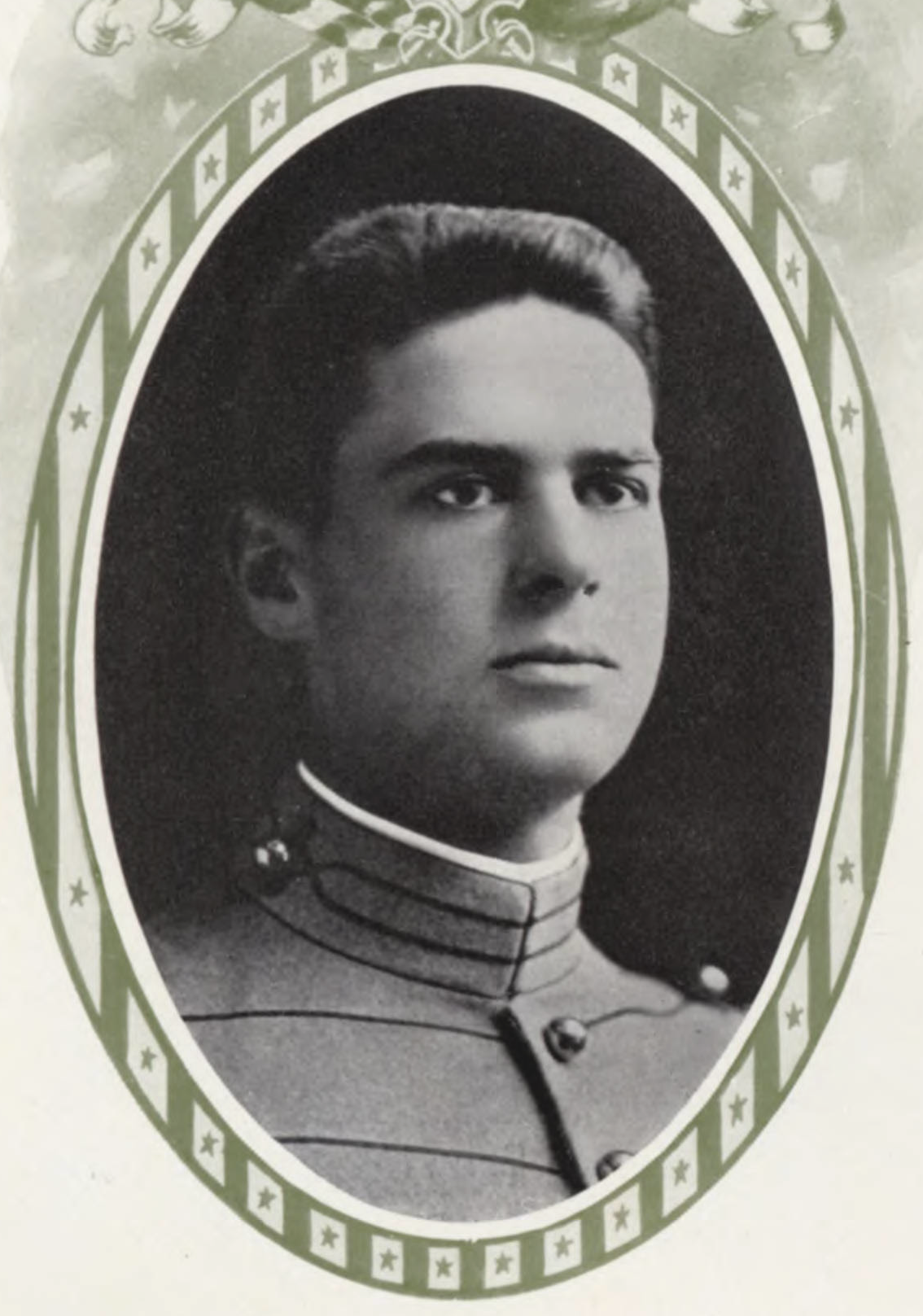
At West Point in 1916

At the United States Military Academy at West Point from 1911 to 1915, Weyand starred at tackle and was the captain of the 1915 team.

Nicknamed during his "yearling" (sophomore) year at West Point "Babe" by his teammate Dwight David Eisenhower, he was described in The Real All Americans: The Team That Changed a Game, a People, a Nation (Jenkins, S., Random House 2007) as a "tireless, one-man wrecking crew."

In 1913, Army lost one game—against Notre Dame and its legends Knute Rockne and Gus Dorais. They were undefeated in 1914 with a 20–7 win over the Irish. And they beat Navy in 1913, 1914 and 1915, the same years Weyand was selected to the College Football All-America Team.

An all around athlete, Weyand played for the 1912 West Point Basketball and 1915 Ice Hockey squad, and was a member of the class fencing and swimming teams in 1916, runner up to Bob Neyland for Heavyweight Boxing Champion of the Academy and Heavyweight Wrestling Champion of the Academy 1913, 1915 and 1916.

=== Military career ===
After graduating from West Point, Weyand served with distinction in World War I, where he earned a Silver Star (gallantry), Purple Heart (wounded in action) and battlefield promotion to major and battalion commander.

After World War I, he competed in the heavyweight Greco-Roman class in wrestling at the 1920 Summer Olympics.

Due to severe hearing loss caused by frontline duty in World War I, Weyand could not serve in combat in World War II. He retired from active duty in 1946 at the rank of Colonel.

=== Sports historian ===
In retirement, Col. Weyand wrote a series of acclaimed sports histories, including the seminal Saga of American Football (New York: Macmillan, 1955), foreword by Grantland Rice who described him as probably the then foremost living authority on the sport, winner of the 1955 Helms Athletic Foundation Award, and "Football Immortals" winner of the 1962 Helms Award. Sports historian John Sayle Watterson in his book College Football: History, Spectacle, Controversy (Baltimore: Johns Hopkins University Press, 2000) described the "Saga" as follows "[s]uccinct and fast-paced, Weyand's history masterfully depicts the game's origins, its early stars and teams, the geographic expansion of football, and the changes in its rules."

In 1965, Weyand and former Delaware lacrosse coach Milton Roberts wrote The Lacrosse Story, the first full-length history of the sport of lacrosse based on nine years of research.

=== Death ===
Weyand died on May 10, 1982, in North Bellmore, New York. He is interred next to his wife, Marie, at West Point Cemetery. His son, Lieutenant General Alexander Mulqueen Weyand (1928–2011), graduated from West Point in 1952 and was a member of the 1951 National Championship Lacrosse team.
