= Howard Parker Talman =

American football player and coach (1893–1961)

Biographical details
- Born: December 9, 1893; Spring Valley, New York, U.S.
- Died: March 22, 1961 (aged 67); Lakeland, Florida, U.S.

Playing career
- 1912–1915: Rutgers
- Positions: Halfback, guard, fullback

Coaching career (HC unless noted)
- 1925: Rollins
- 1928–1929: Weaver

Administrative career (AD unless noted)
- 1921–1924: Chattanooga
- 1925–1926: Rollins
- ?–1933: Lynchburg

Accomplishments and honors

Awards
- Second-team All-American (1915); 2× Third-team All-American (1913, 1914)

Howard Parker "Tal" Talman (December 9, 1893 – March 22, 1961) was an American football player and coach. He played college football at Rutgers University from 1913 to 1915 and was the first Rutgers Scarlet Knights football player to be selected as an All-American.

Talman was born in Spring Valley, New York, in 1893. He attended Rutgers University, where he played college football. In 1913, he became the first Rutgers Scarlet Knights football player to receive All-American honors. He was selected by Parke H. Davis as a first-team All-American at the guard position in 1913, by Walter Camp as a third-team All-American halfback in 1914, and as a second-team All-American fullback in 1915 by both Camp and New York sports writer, Monty.

Talman also holds the Rutgers football single-game scoring record with 48 points scored (6 touchdowns, 12 extra points) in a game played against RPI on October 9, 1915. He also competed for Rutgers in baseball and track and was selected as the captain of the 1915 Rutgers football team.

Talman later played professional football for the Massillon Tigers. He also played and coached football at the University of Chattanooga.

Talman died on March 22, 1961, in Lakeland, Florida.

== Honors ==
Talman was inducted into the Rutgers Football Hall of Fame in 1989, the University of Chattanooga Hall of Fame in 1987, and the Rockland County Track & Field Hall of Fame. In 2014, Talman was selected by the Big Ten Network as one of the ten best Rutgers football players of all time.
