= William Garlow =

American football player (1888–1959)

Biographical details
- Born: January 1, 1888; New York, U.S.
- Died: April 14, 1959 (aged 71); Niagara Falls, New York, U.S.

Playing career

Football
- 1911–1913: Carlisle

Baseball
- 1911: Jackson Convicts
- 1912–1913: Hamilton Kolts
- 1914: Lewiston Cupids
- Position: Pitcher (baseball)

Coaching career (HC unless noted)

Football
- 1915: West Virginia Wesleyan

Head coaching record
- Overall: 4–4–1

William Garlow (January 1, 1888 – April 14, 1959) was an American minor league baseball player and college football player and coach. He served as the head football coach at West Virginia Wesleyan College in Buckhannon, West Virginia, during the 1915 season. Prior to that, he was an athlete at the Carlisle Indian School in Carlisle, Pennsylvania, where he was teammates with future National Football League star Jim Thorpe.

== Head coaching record ==
Year	Team	Overall	Conference	Standing	Bowl/playoffs
West Virginia Wesleyan Bobcats (Independent) (1915)
1910	West Virginia Wesleyan	4–4–1			
West Virginia Wesleyan:		4–4–1			
Total:		4–4–1			
