= John H. Brown Jr. =

American football player and United States Navy admiral

John Herbert Brown Jr.
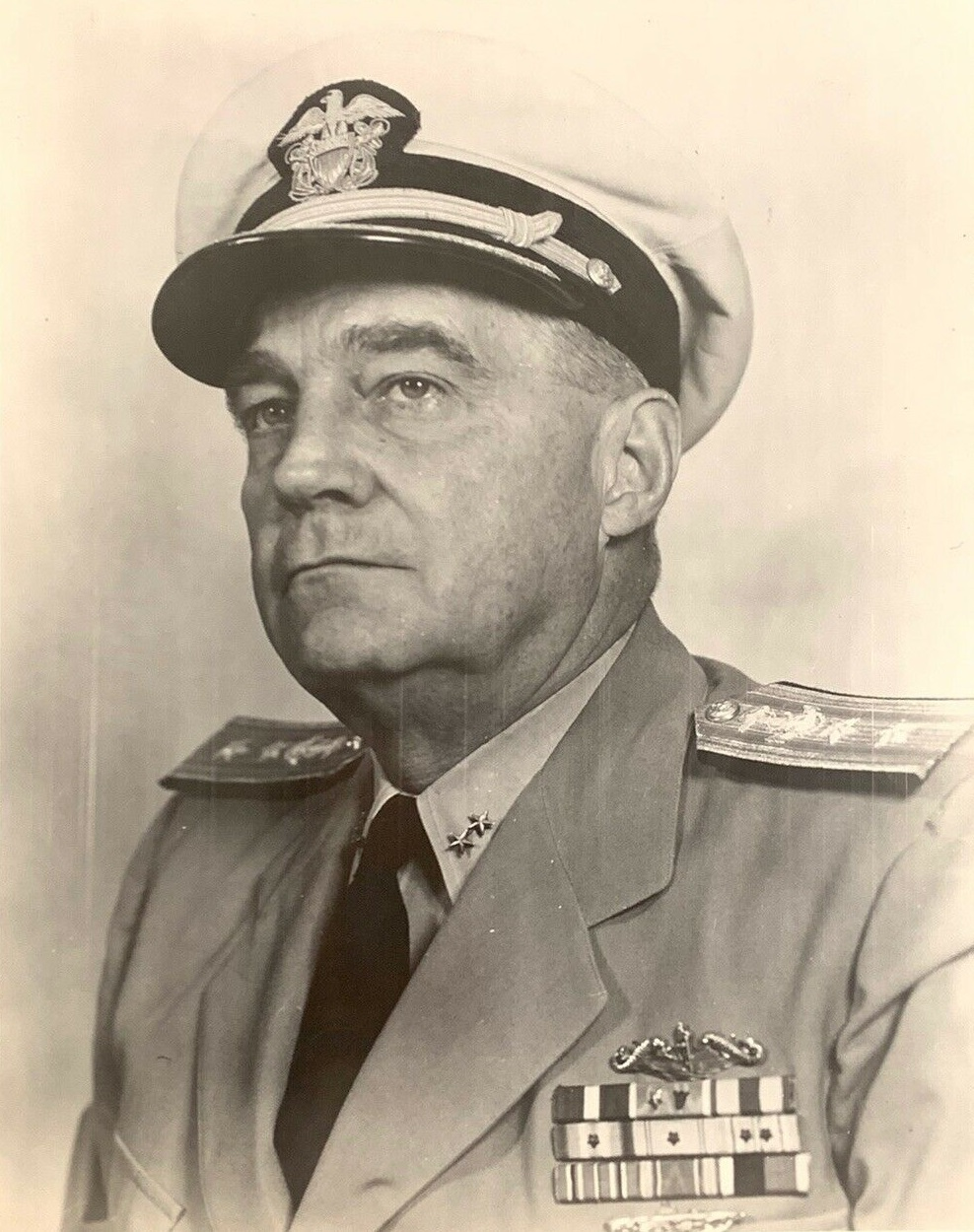
- RADM John H. Brown Jr., USN
- Born: October 12, 1891; Canton, Pennsylvania, US
- Died: June 10, 1963 (aged 71); Middletown, Delaware, US
- Burial place: Arlington National Cemetery
- Military career
- Allegiance: United States
- Branch: United States Navy
- Service years: 1914–1954
- Rank: Vice Admiral
- Nickname: "Babe"
- Commands: Fourth Naval District; Submarine Force, Pacific Fleet; Cruiser Division One; Submarine Training Command; Submarine Squadron 4 USS Richmond; USS Narwhal
- Conflicts: Occupation of Veracuz; World War I World War II; Korean War
- Awards: Distinguished Service Medal; Legion of Merit (2)
- Other work: President, National Football Foundation

John Herbert "Babe" Brown, Jr. (October 12, 1891 – June 10, 1963) was a decorated officer in the United States Navy with the rank of vice admiral during World War II and an American football player. A graduate of the United States Naval Academy, Brown trained as submariner and served successively as commander, Submarine Squadron 4 and commander Training Command, Submarine Force, Pacific Fleet in the opening years of World War II. Brown was then promoted to rear admiral and commanded Cruiser Division One during the bombardment of Japan in summer 1945.

Following the War, Brown remained in the Navy and commanded successively Portsmouth Naval Shipyard; Submarine Force, Pacific Fleet and Fourth Naval District, before retiring in January 1954.

== Early career ==
John H. Brown Jr. was born on October 12, 1891, in Canton, Pennsylvania, as the son of John H. Brown. Following the graduation from local high school in summer of 1910, he earned an appointment to the United States Naval Academy at Annapolis, Maryland, and became active in football and wrestling teams. Brown excelled in football and awarded Varsity "N" for excellence. He was nicknamed "Babe" or "the Great Babe" and gained reputation as superb Guard, who was accounted for all of Navy's points (two field goals) in a 6 to 0 victory in the 1913 Army–Navy Game. He was selected by Walter Camp as a consensus first-team guard on the 1913 College Football All-America Team.

Among his classmate were several admirals, who distinguished later during World War II including Wilder D. Baker, Carleton F. Bryant, Robert W. Cary, Edward L. Cochrane, Richard L. Conolly, Edward Ellsberg, William K. Harrill, Robert W. Hayler, Oliver Kessing, Herbert J. Ray, Joseph Redman, Theodore D. Ruddock, John B. W. Waller and Lloyd J. Wiltse.

Brown graduated with Bachelor of Science degree on June 6, 1914, and was commissioned ensign on that date. He was subsequently assigned to battleship Georgia under the command of future Chief of Naval Operations, Robert Coontz and deployed to Mexican waters in order to protect American interests during the Mexican Revolution. From August to October 1914, Georgia operated in Haitian waters to protect Americans in the country, which was also experiencing internal unrest.

In December 1916, Brown was ordered to the Naval Submarine Base New London, Connecticut, for submarine instruction, which he completed several months later aboard submarine tender Fulton. He was then assigned to submarine C-2, patrolling the coast of Florida. Following the United States entry into World War I, Brown was promoted to lieutenant (junior grade) in June 1917 and transferred to submarine G-4, which served for training and instruction duties at New London Submarine School. While in this capacity, Brown was promoted to the temporary rank of lieutenant in October 1917 and assumed command of the submarine.

== Interwar period ==
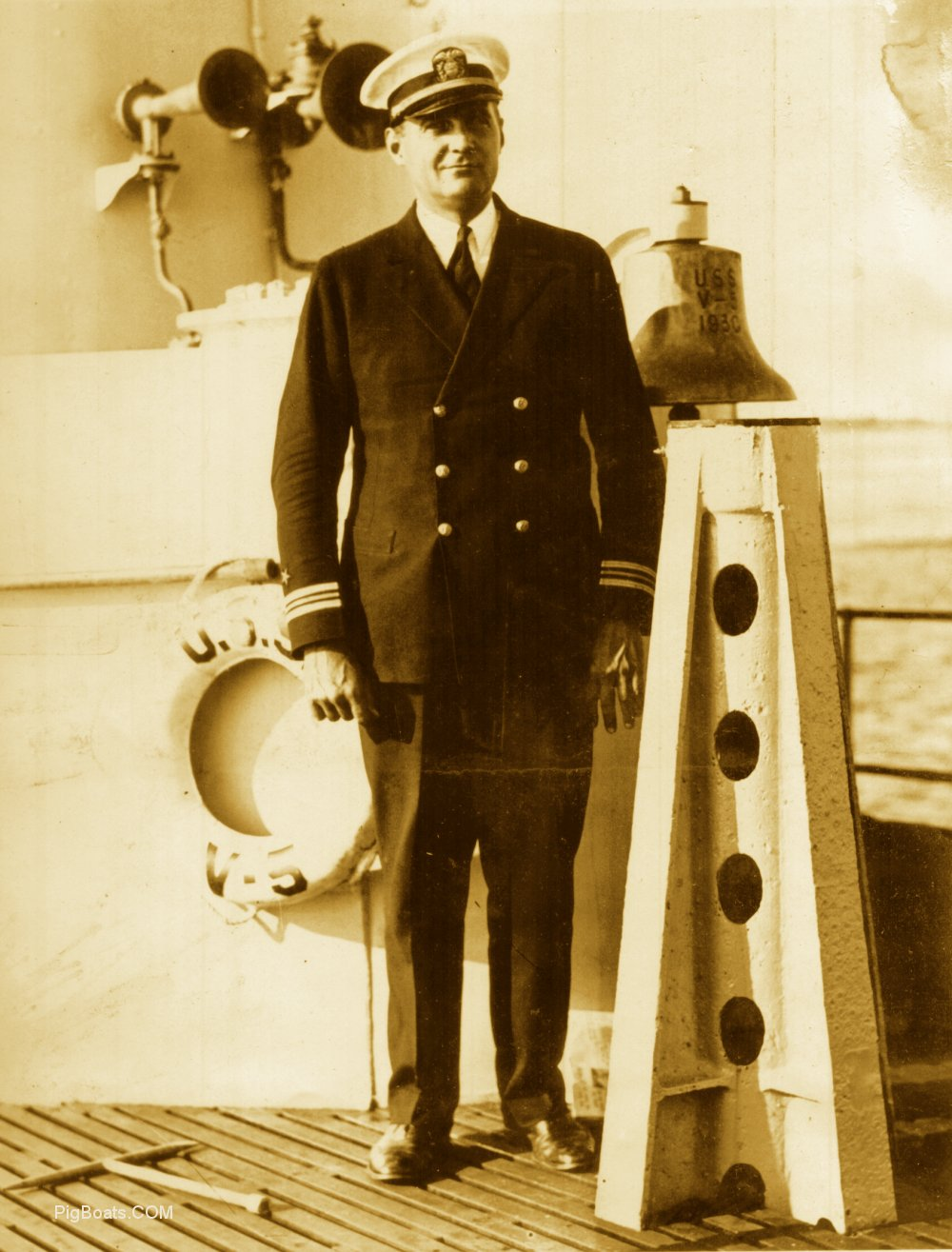
Brown as lieutenant commander aboard submarine Narwhal in 1930.

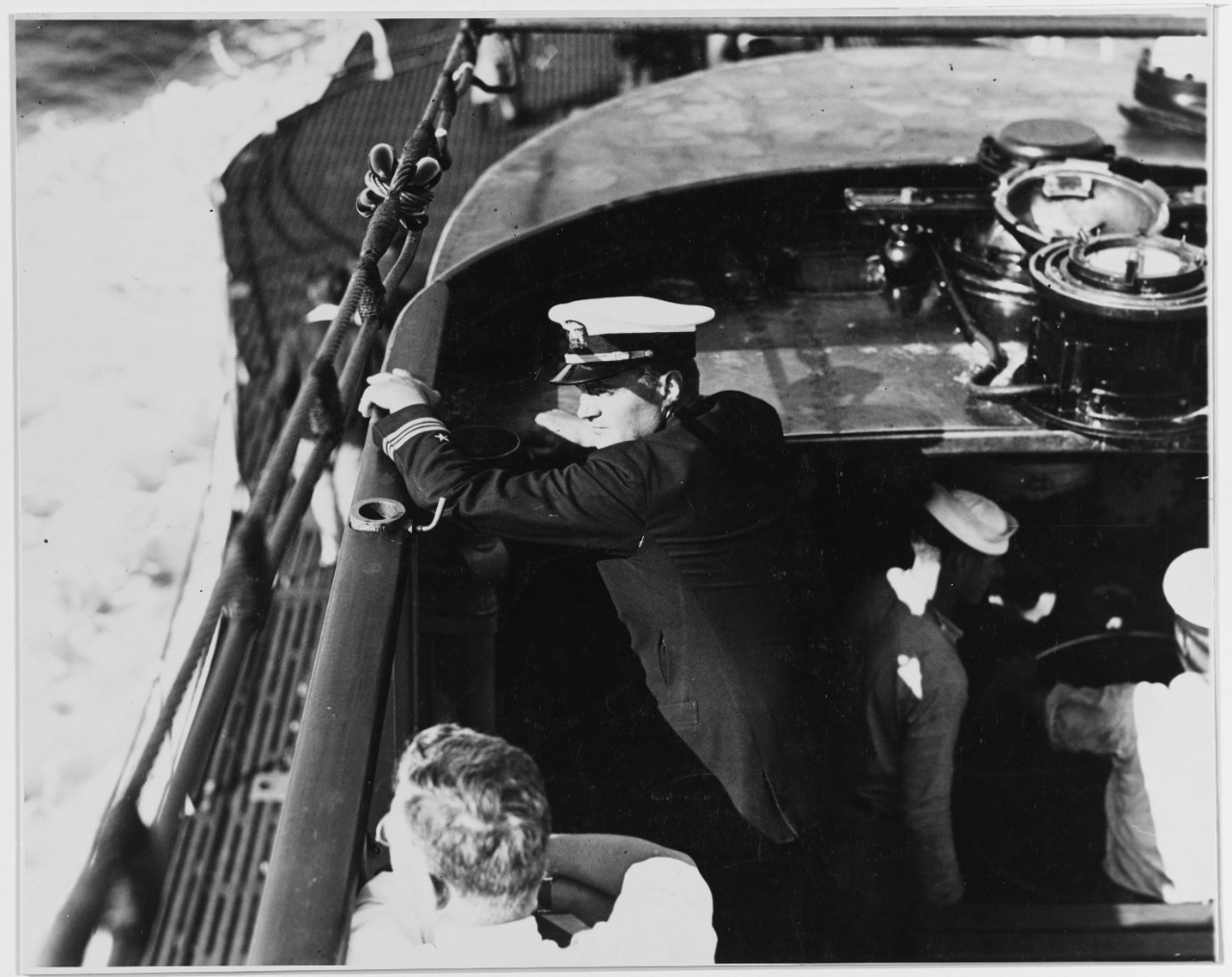
Brown aboard submarine Narwhal in July 1930.

In early 1919, Brown was ordered to Boston Navy Yard, where he joined the crew of newly commissioned submarine R-2 under Lieutenant Commander Charles M. Cooke. He later relieved Cooke as commanding officer and participated in the summer exercises off southern New England, before proceeded through Panama Canal to ship's new base in San Pedro, California.

Brown was detached in September 1921 and ordered to the Bethlehem Steel Company in Quincy, Massachusetts, for duty in connection with fitting out of submarine S-42. The ship was commissioned in late November 1924 and Brown took her to Caribbean for patrol duty. While in command, he was promoted to lieutenant commander in June 1925.

In October 1927, Brown was transferred to Washington, D.C., where he joined the Office of the Chief of Naval Operations. He was ordered to Portsmouth Naval Shipyard in September 1929 for duty in connection with fitting out of submarine Narwhal, the lead ship of her class. The ship was commissioned on May 15, 1930, and Brown participated in the sea trials off the Boon Island in Gulf of Maine. His ship dived to 332 feet and remained there for 45 minutes, breaking the Navy record for depth. Also aboard was commandant of Philadelphia Navy Yard, Rear Admiral William W. Phelps.

Following a period of patrol duty with Pacific Fleet off Hawaii and the West Coast of the United States, Brown was transferred to the United States Naval Academy at Annapolis, Maryland, by the end of May 1933 and joined the Department of Physical Training. He served consecutively under Captains John W. Wilcox Jr. and Robert C. Giffen as graduate manager of athletics and was promoted to commander on June 30, 1935.

In September 1936, Brown was transferred to the light cruiser Milwaukee and assumed duty as an executive officer under Captain Alan G. Kirk. He participated in the patrol cruises through the Western Pacific during the period of tensions between China and Japan and returned to the United States in December 1938 for duty as officer-in-charge of the Naval Recruiting Station Philadelphia.

Brown was ordered to the Naval War College in Newport, Rhode Island, in June 1940 and completed Senior course there one year later. He was promoted to captain on July 1, 1941, and assumed command of light cruiser Richmond. Brown participated with his ship as the part of rear admiral Abel T. Bidwell's Cruiser Division 3 in the neutrality patrols off the coast of Chile against Nazi Germany raiders and after Japanese attack on Pearl Harbor on December 7, 1941, he led Richmond to Panama Canal Zone.

== World War II ==
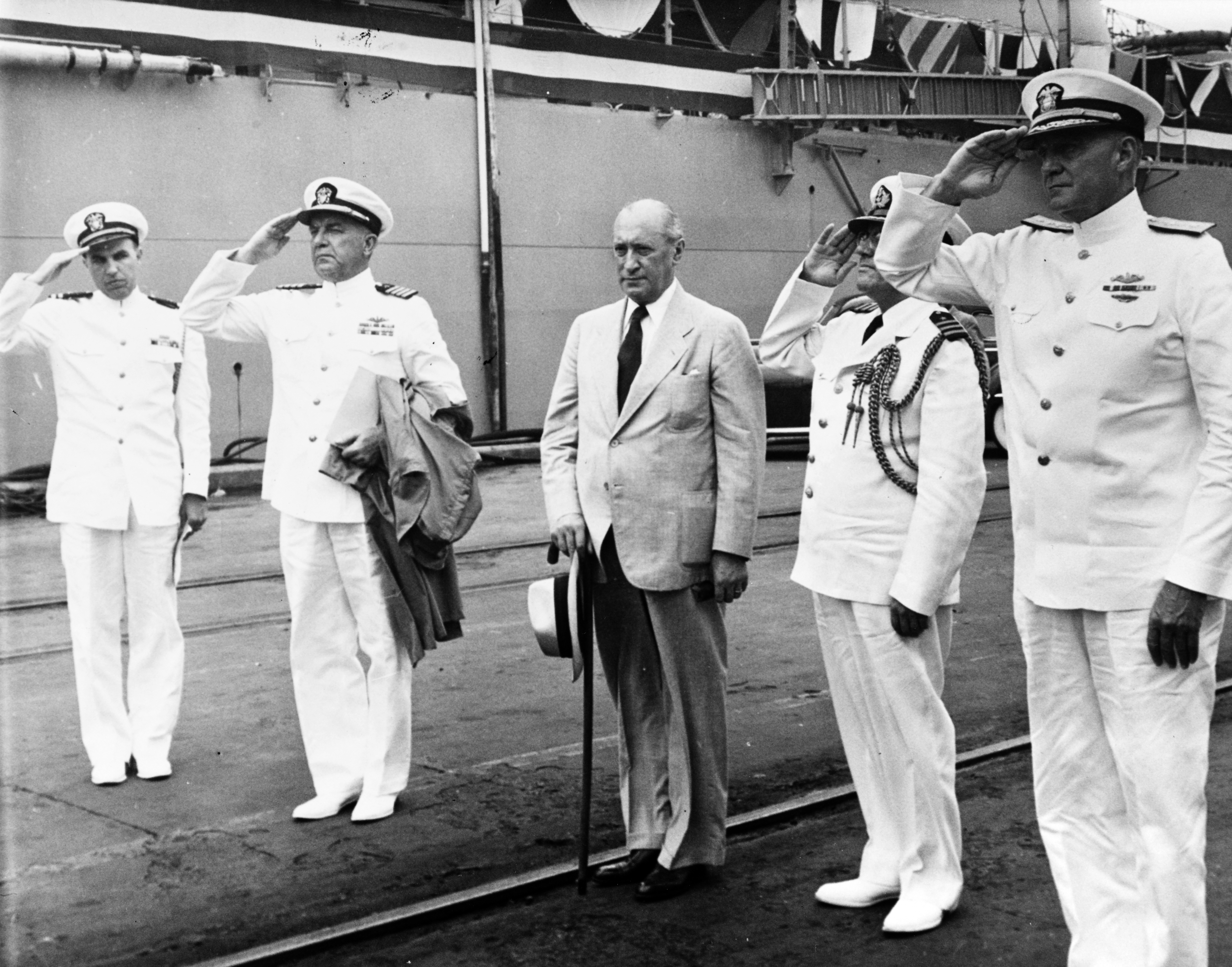
Brown (right) during the commissioning ceremony of ex-USS Brooklyn as O'Higgins in the Chilean Navy at Philadelphia Navy Yard in June 1951.

During the opening months of the United States involvement in the World War II, Brown commanded Richmond during the escorting reinforcement convoys to the Galápagos Islands and Society Islands. He was transferred to Pearl Harbor, Hawaii, in mid-June 1942 and assumed duty as commander, Submarine Squadron 4. While in this capacity, he was responsible for the administration and training of three submarine divisions of total 15 submarines and for planning of their operations. The ships under his command had sink seventy-two ships totaling 394,752 tons and in damaging 54 ships totaling 374,449 tons during this period.

He was an early advocate of wolf packs and participated in the fifth patrol aboard his former submarine Narwhal in the Kurile Islands area from June to August 1943, becoming the oldest officer to make a war patrol during the war. For his service in this capacity, he was decorated with Legion of Merit with Combat "V".

Following the tragic death of Rear Admiral Robert H. English on January 21, 1943, Brown served as acting commander of the Pacific Fleet submarine force for three weeks, before Rear Admiral Charles A. Lockwood relieved him. He then resumed his command of Submarine Squadron 4 and remained in that command until November that year, when he was promoted to rear admiral and appointed commander Training Command, Submarine Force, Pacific Fleet.

While in this capacity, Brown also established an intensive training program at Pearl Harbor, which included a Torpedo Data Computer school to improve proficiency in submarine fire control. He was further responsible for the study of enemy tactics and anti-submarine measures and the necessary development of attack doctrines, evasive tactics and counter anti-submarine measures to successfully cope with the intensified enemy activity. He also developed Submarine Lifeguard Exercises which enabled submarines of the force to successfully carry out missions of recovering numerous friendly aviators downed in enemy waters. He was decorated with Navy Distinguished Service Medal for his service as commander Training Command, Submarine Force, Pacific Fleet.

Brown remained in that assignment until the end of April 1945, when he was transferred to North Pacific and assumed command of Cruiser Division One, a part of North Pacific Force under Vice Admiral Frank J. Fletcher. His command consisted of four old light cruisers, all with over twenty years of service, and Brown broke his flag aboard his former command Richmond. Other ships were Concord, Trenton and Detroit.

His force conducted four anti-shipping sweeps in enemy waters and seven bombardments of enemy territory in the Kuriles, inflicting considerable damage on the enemy and his shipping. Following the surrender of Japan, Cruiser Division One participated in the occupation of Northern Honshu and Hokkaido, Japan. Brown received his second Legion of Merit with Combat "V" for his service in the North Pacific.

== Postwar service ==
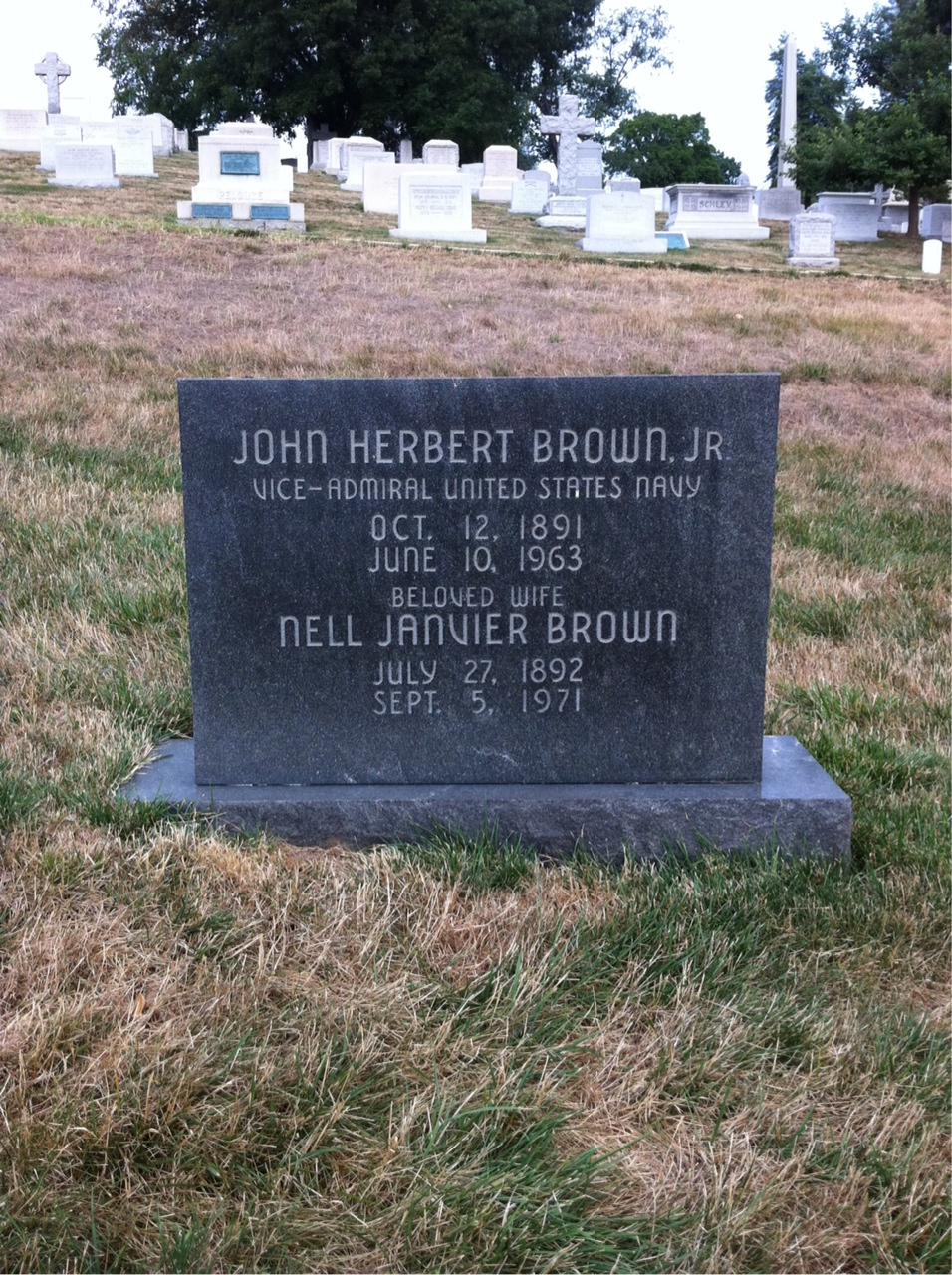
Brown'S grave at Arlington National Cemetery.

Following the war, Brown succeeded admiral Fletcher as commander, North Pacific Force and remained in that capacity for few months, before returned to the United States for duty as commander, Portsmouth Naval Shipyard. He remained in that assignment until November 1949, when returned to Hawaii for duty as commander, Submarine Force, Pacific Fleet, an assignment he once held in early 1943. Brown commanded all Pacific Fleet submarines during the early months of Korean War.

Brown assumed his final assignment in May 1951, when he was transferred to Philadelphia Navy Yard for duty as commandant, Fourth Naval District, which consisted of the following geographic areas: Pennsylvania, the southern part of New Jersey (including the counties of Burlington, Ocean, and all counties south thereof), and Delaware (including Winter Quarters Shoal Light Vessel). He was succeeded by Rear Admiral Ernest H. Von Heimburg and retired from active duty on January 31, 1954, after almost forty years of commissioned service. Brown was advanced to the rank of vice admiral on the retired list for having been specially commended in combat.

== Retirement ==
Upon his retirement from the Navy, Brown was appointed president of the National Football Foundation, which sponsors the College Football Hall of Fame. While still in the Navy, he was selected to the all-time all-star Navy team and also elected to the Rutgers University Hall of Fame in October 1951. Brown was also a member of the Naval Order of the United States. Vice Admiral John H. Brown Jr. died on June 10, 1963, aged 71 in Middletown, Delaware. He was buried with full military honors at Arlington National Cemetery, Virginia, together with his wife Nellie R. Janvier. They had two children: a son John H. Brown 3rd and a daughter Mariana Willie.

== Decorations ==
Here is the ribbon bar of Vice admiral John H. Brown Jr.:

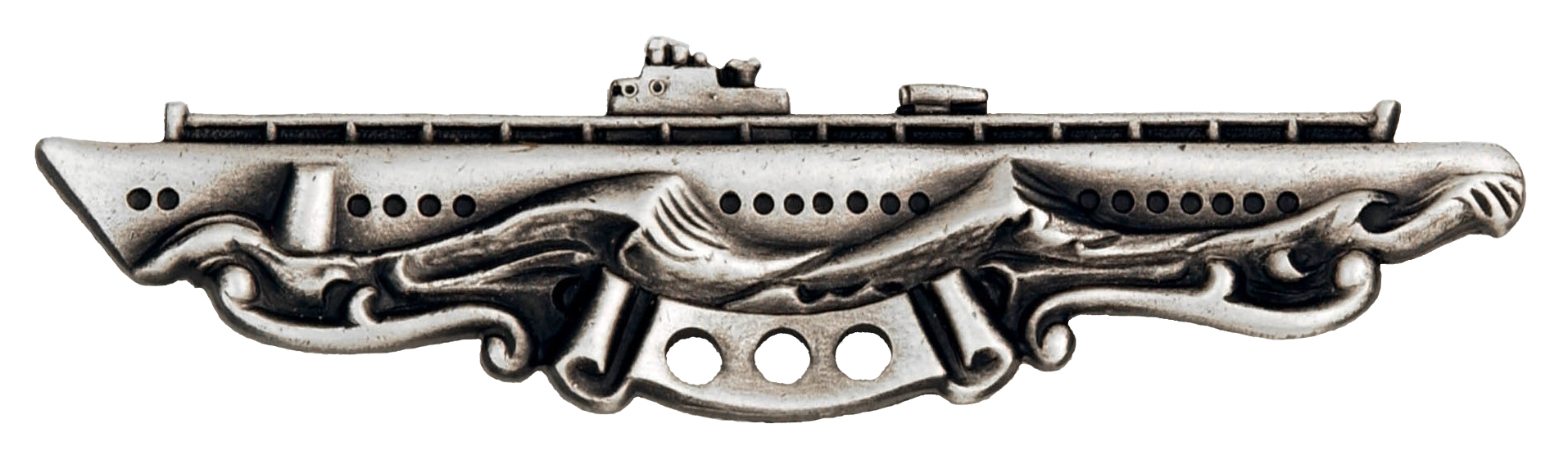

Submarine Warfare insignia
1st Row	Navy Distinguished Service Medal	Legion of Merit with Combat "V" and one 5/16" Gold Star	Mexican Service Medal
2nd Row	World War I Victory Medal with Atlantic Fleet Clasp	American Defense Service Medal with Fleet Clasp	Asiatic-Pacific Campaign Medal with two bronze 3/16" service stars
3rd Row	American Campaign Medal	World War II Victory Medal	Navy Occupation Service Medal
4th Row	National Defense Service Medal	Korean Service Medal	United Nations Korea Medal
Submarine Combat Patrol insignia

== See also ==
- USS Narwhal (SS-167)

Military offices
Preceded by Roscoe E. Schuirmann	Commandant, Fourth Naval District; May 1951 - January, 1954	Succeeded by Ernest H. Von Heimburg
Preceded by Oswald S. Colclough	Commander, Submarine Force, Pacific Fleet; November 1949 - May, 1951	Succeeded by Charles B. Momsen
