= Shorty Miller =

American football player (1890–1966)

- Miller during his career at Penn State

Profile
- Position: Quarterback

Personal information
- Born: November 15, 1890; Andersontown, Pennsylvania, U.S.
- Died: September 20, 1966 (aged 75); Harrisburg, Pennsylvania, U.S.
- Listed height: 5 ft 5 in (1.65 m)
- Listed weight: 145 lb (66 kg)

Career information
- College: Penn State (1910–1913)

Awards and highlights
- 2× National champion (1911, 1912); Third-team All-American (1913)
- College Football Hall of Fame (Class of 1974)

Eugene Ellsworth "Shorty" Miller (November 15, 1890 – September 20, 1966) was an American football player. He was elected to the College Football Hall of Fame in 1974.

Miller played quarterback at Penn State from 1910 to 1913, missing only one game during his tenure and amassing a 23–8–2 record. His short stature (5 ft 5 in or 1.65 m) and stubby legs earned him the nickname "the Meteoric Midget". Miller would go on to start all four seasons at Penn State, missing just one game. In 1913, he rushed for 250 yards against Carnegie Tech University — a Penn State single-game rushing record that lasted 68 years (and still the Penn State single-game rushing record for a quarterback).

Miller was the last true freshman to start at quarterback and open a season for Penn State at that position, until Rob Bolden was selected by coach Joe Paterno to open the Nittany Lions 2010 season.
