= Louis A. Merrilat =

American football player and military officer (1892–1948)

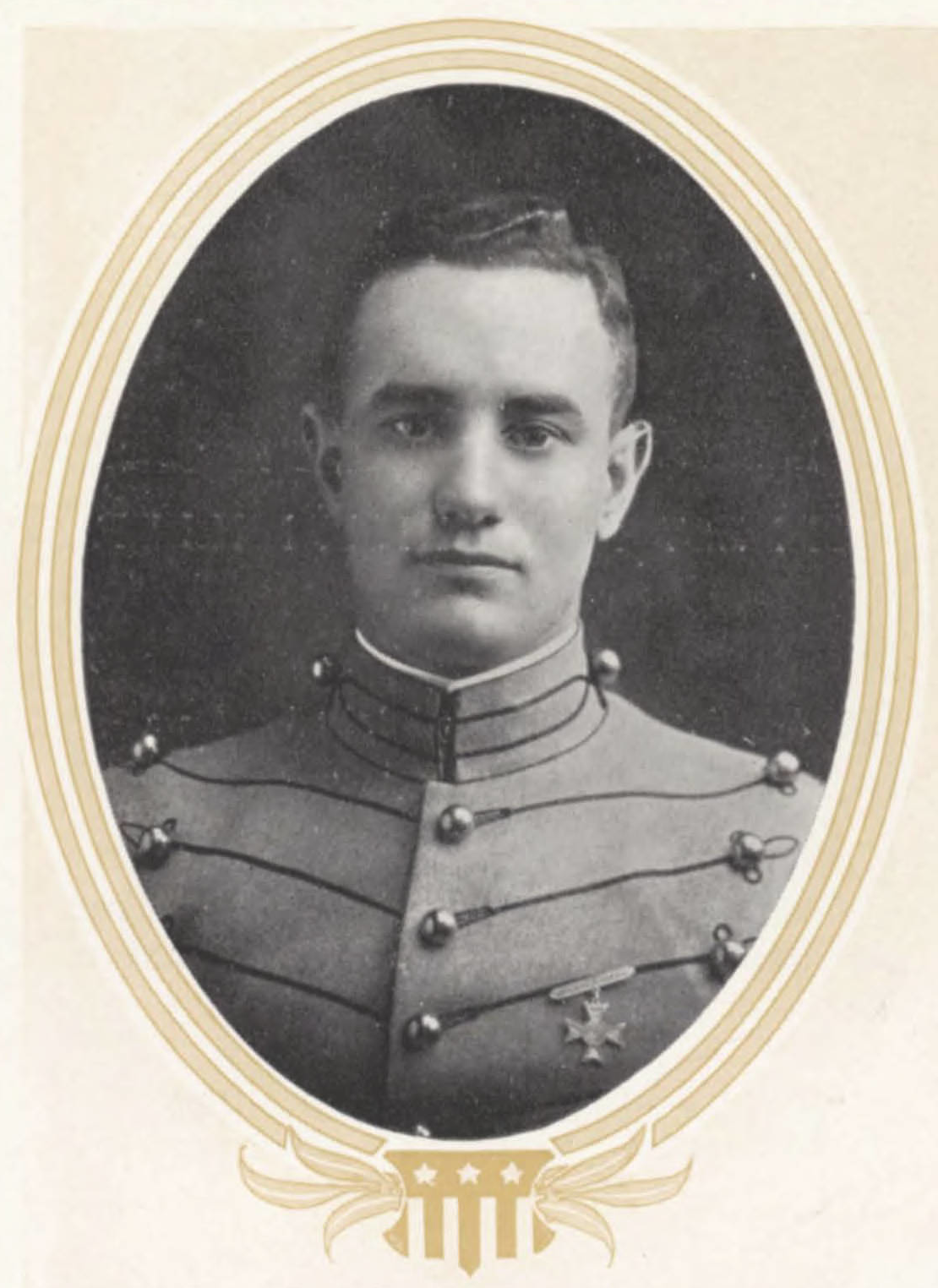
- Merrilat at West Point in 1915

Profile
- Position: End

Personal information
- Born: June 9, 1892; Chicago, Illinois, U.S.
- Died: April 26, 1948 (aged 55); Chicago, Illinois, U.S.

Career information
- College: Army

Awards and highlights
- National champion (1914); Consensus All-American (1913); First-team All-American (1914)
- Stats at Pro Football Reference

Louis Alfred "Merry" Merrilat (Merillat), Jr. (June 9, 1892 – April 26, 1948) was an American football end and military officer. He played college football with Army and was selected as a first-team All-American in both 1913 and 1914. He was wounded in battle while serving in France during World War I and later played in the National Football League for the Canton Bulldogs in the 1925 NFL season. He became a soldier of fortune, training Iran's Persian Guard, working with the Chinese Army in the 1930s, and serving in the French Foreign Legion.

== Biography ==
=== Athlete at West Point ===
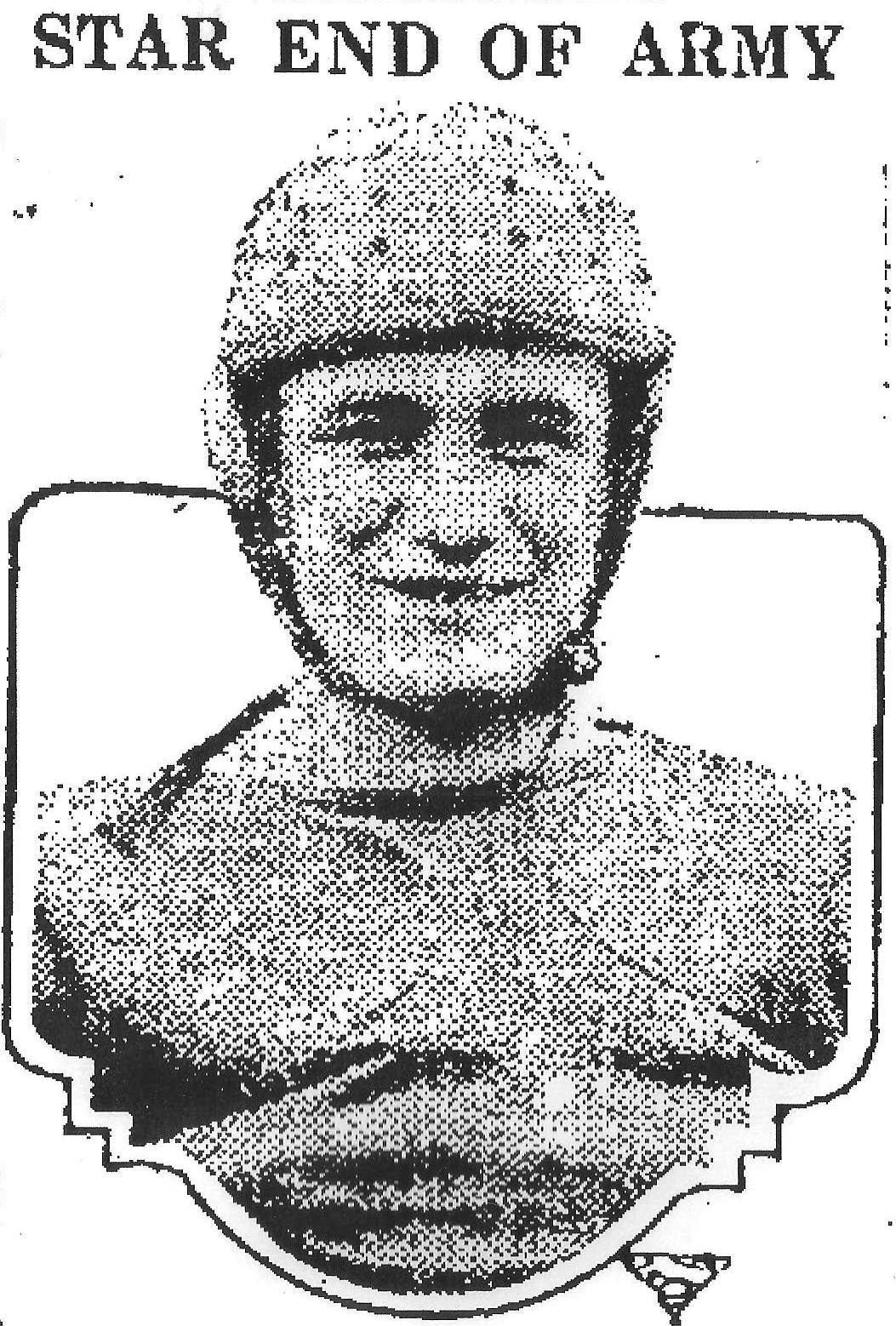
Merrilat at West Point in 1914

A native of Chicago, Illinois, Merrilat (Merillat) was a cadet at the United States Military Academy at West Point, New York, from June 1911 to June 1915. While serving as a cadet, Merrilat (Merillat) was an all-around athlete, competing for Army in football, baseball, basketball and track. He gained fame as an end for the Army Black Knights football team and was selected as a first-team All-American in both 1913 and 1914. The passing team of "Prichard to Merrilat" was one of the first great passing combinations in college football, and Merrilat was noted for playing "the western game, something which had not been seen before in the east." Merrilat's teammates on the Army football teams included two of the leading generals of World War II – Omar Bradley, who played at the opposite end position from Merrilat, and Dwight D. Eisenhower, who played halfback until a leg injury sidelined him.

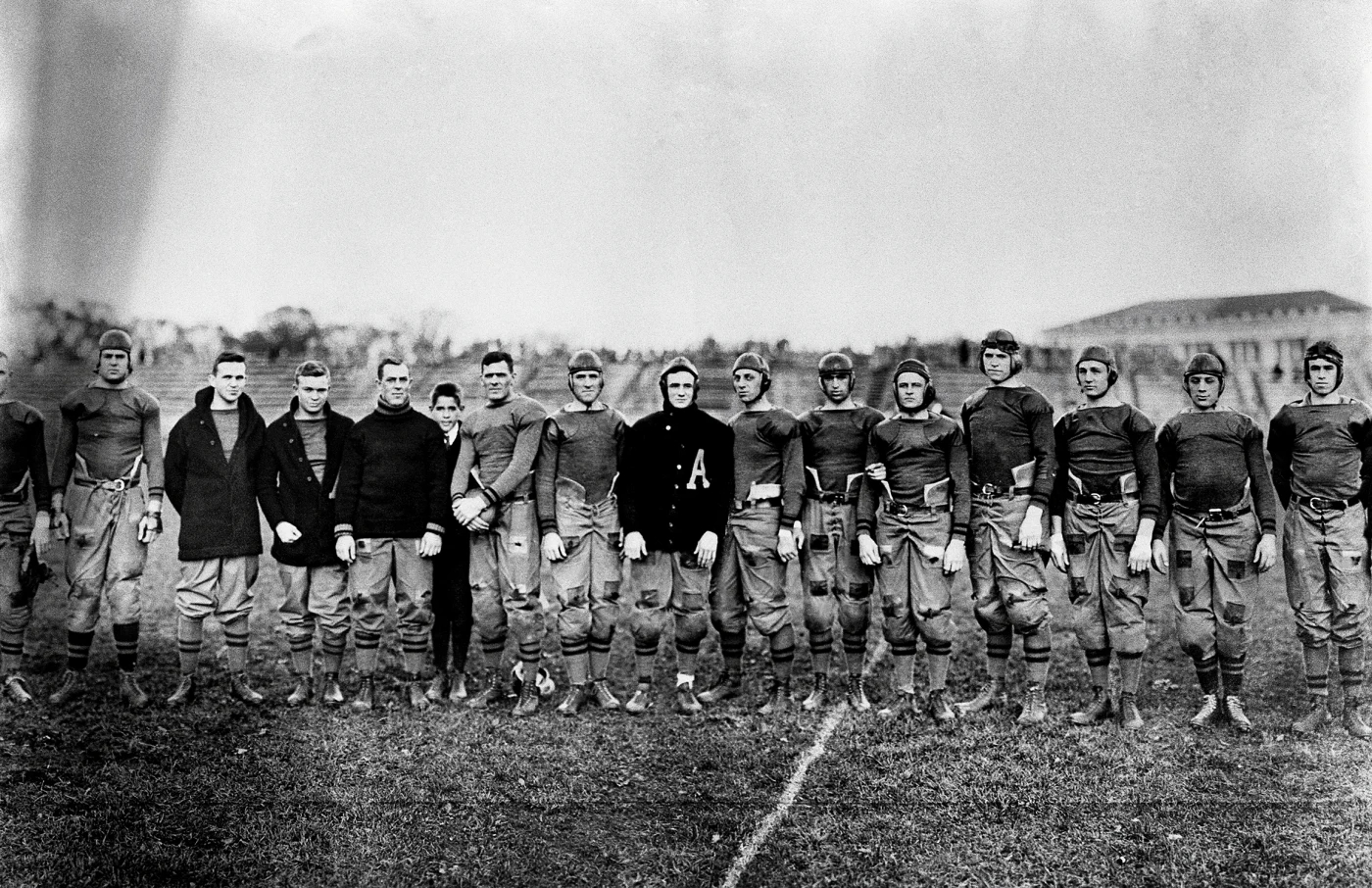
The 1912 West Point football team. Dwight D. Eisenhower is third from left. Louis Merillat is eighth from the left, in the A sweater. Omar Bradley is on the far right, to the left of Leland Hobbs.

In 1913, he helped the Army defeat a Navy team that allowed only seven points in its other games. Army defeated Navy 22 to 9, as Merrilat scored 18 points on two touchdown passes and a 60-yard run.

In 1914, Merrilat helped lead Army to an undefeated 9–0 season. In the final game of the season, Army defeated Navy 20 to 0, as Merillat blocked a punt in the end zone for a safety and scored on a 20-yard touchdown pass.

=== Military service ===
After graduating, Merrilat served in the U.S. Army as a second lieutenant from 1915 to 1916 and a first lieutenant from 1916 to 1917. In May 1917, one month after the entry of the United States into World War I, Merrilat was promoted to the rank of captain of the infantry. He sailed for France with the American Expeditionary Forces (AEF) in March 1918 and was promoted to the rank of temporary major of the infantry in June 1918. While serving with the 38th Infantry Regiment he participated in the Battle of Château-Thierry, Second Battle of the Marne, and Meuse–Argonne offensive. He was severely wounded by airplane machine gun fire at Avocourt and sailed for the United States on December 24, 1918, by which time the war was over.

=== Professional football and basketball ===
In 1925, Merrilat played one season of professional football for the Canton Bulldogs in the early days of the National Football League.

In 1926, Merrilat and a partner, Jim Kinney, organized a professional basketball team in Canton, Ohio. At the time, Merillat expressed his belief that professional basketball would flourish, telling a reporter for an Ohio newspaper, "Professional basketball is attracting the sport fans because it is the best type of basketball they can see ... [A] professional basketball team is made up of the stars from several teams and necessarily must be stronger and better than any amateur team because it is composed of experts." Merrilat opined that his Canton team was "one of the strongest in the country."

=== Soldier of fortune ===
Merrilat spent many years as a "soldier of fortune." In Iran, he trained the Persian Guard. From Iran, Merrilat traveled to China where he was a general and trained more than 40,000 Chinese troops, "the pick of their army." Merrilat developed a reputation as a soldier with "no equal as a troop trainer or an army builder." When World War II began, Merrilat reported to the French and served on the Maginot Line. After a few months, he left and became a captain in the French Foreign Legion where he reportedly "served with bravery and distinction."

=== World War II ===
When the United States entered the war after the attack on Pearl Harbor, Merrilat resigned from the French Foreign Legion and enlisted in the U.S. Army, where he was given a position training the troops. Promoted to the rank of colonel, Merrilat was put in charge of the Army's forces at Miami Beach, Florida, during World War II. Ninety hotels in Miami Beach were taken over by the Army during the war, and Merrilat turned over the keys to the final building to Mayor Herbert Frink in June 1946.

=== Family and death ===
In November 1915, Merrilat became the subject of press coverage when he was sued by Helen Van Ness for breach of promise after breaking off an engagement. Merrilat married another woman, Ethel Wynne, in June 1915. Merrilat hired the noted Chicago attorney, Clarence Darrow, to defend him against the charges, which were eventually dismissed.

After a year-long illness, Merrilat died at South Shore Hospital in Chicago on April 26, 1948, at age 55. He was buried at Arlington National Cemetery. He was survived by his widow and two daughters, Mary Lou Choporis and Ethel Merrilat.

== Military awards ==
- Purple Heart
- World War I Victory Medal
- American Campaign Medal
- World War II Victory Medal
