= Vernon Prichard =

US Army general and football player (1892–1949)

Vernon Edwin Prichard
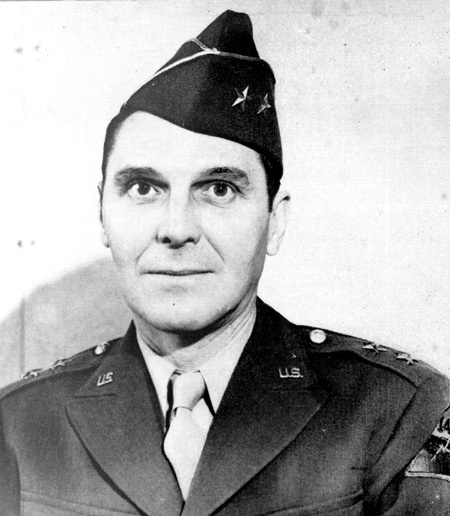
- Born: January 25, 1892; Onawa, Iowa, United States
- Died: July 10, 1949 (aged 57); Washington, D.C., United States
- Military career
- Allegiance: United States
- Branch: United States Army
- Service years: 1915−1949
- Rank: Major General
- Nickname: "Prich"
- Service number: 0-3882
- Unit: Infantry Branch
- Commands: 27th Field Artillery Regiment; 14th Armored Division; 1st Armored Division
- Conflicts: Pancho Villa Expedition; World War I World War II
- Awards: Army Distinguished Service Medal; Legion of Merit

Major General Vernon Edwin Prichard (January 25, 1892 − July 10, 1949) was an American football quarterback and United States Army officer. He played college football with Army and was selected as a first-team All-American in 1914. He became a career officer in the U.S. Army and rose to the rank of major general. He was lifelong friends with West Point classmate Dwight D. "Ike" Eisenhower. He served overseas during both World War I and World War II, and during the latter he commanded the 14th Armored Division in the United States from 1942 to 1944 and the 1st Armored Division from 1944 to 1945 during the Italian campaign.

== Early years ==
A native of Onawa, Iowa, Prichard was the son of attorney J.A. Prichard. The younger Prichard began his education at Morningside College in Sioux City, Iowa, where he also played football and established a reputation as a passer. In November 1910, while he was a student at Morningside, Prichard received word that he had been appointed to the United States Military Academy (USMA) at West Point, New York. He enrolled at West Point on June 11, 1911.

== U.S. Military Academy ==
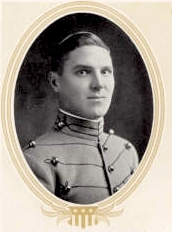
Vernon E. Prichard as a West Point Cadet.

While serving as a cadet at West Point, Prichard played for the Academy's football and baseball teams. He gained his greatest fame in football as the quarterback for the Army Black Knights football team from 1912 to 1914. Prichard's teammates on the Army football teams included two of the leading generals of World War II, Omar Bradley, who played at the end position, and Dwight Eisenhower, who played halfback until a knee injury sidelined him. James Van Fleet, commander of U.S. forces in the Korean War, also played on the 1914 West Point football team with Prichard. Although he weighed only 158 pounds, Prichard played every minute of every major game during his three years of varsity football at West Point.

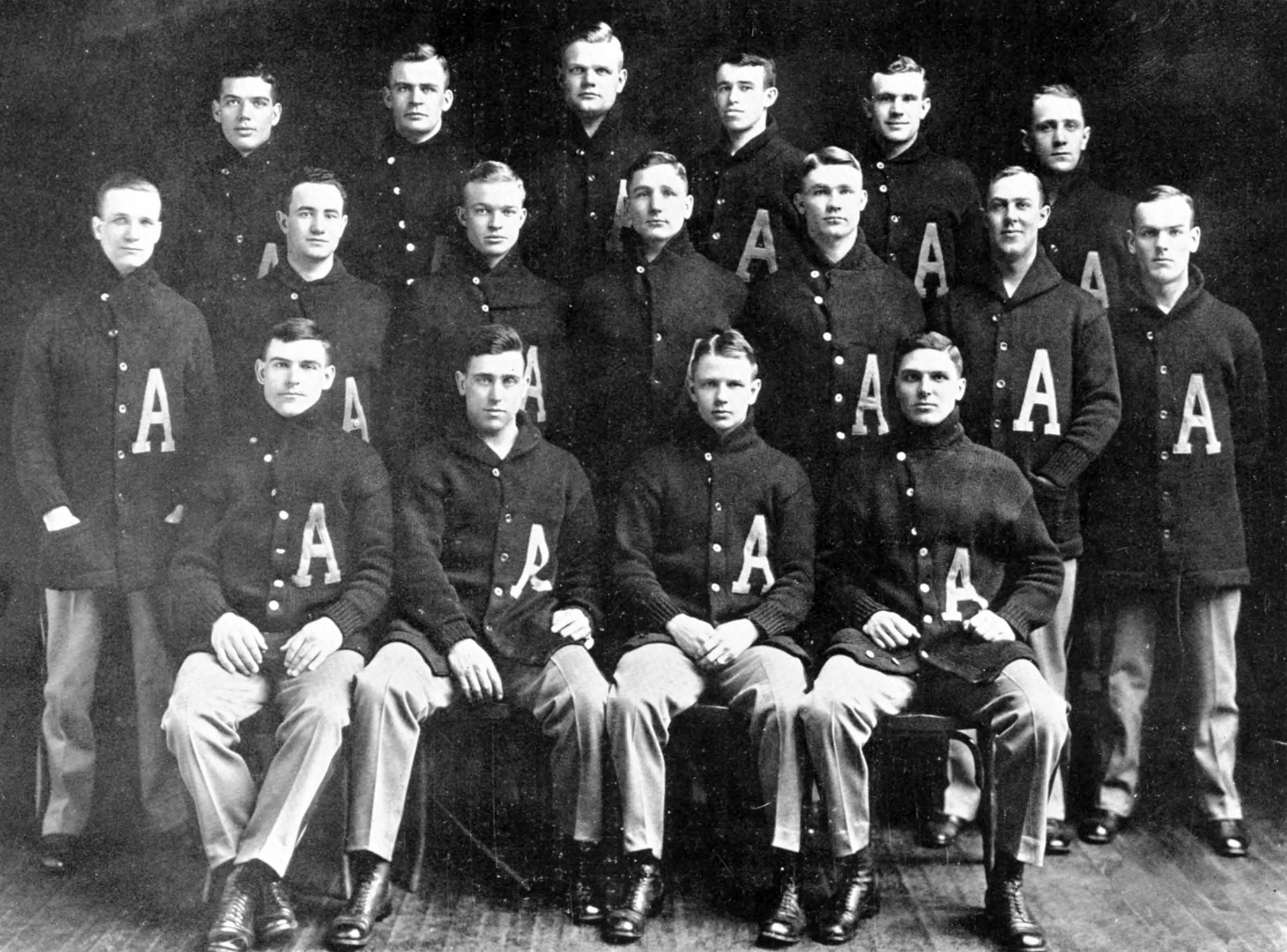
Group photo of the 1915 West Point letterman. Prichard is sat in the front row on the far right.

Prichard first gained national attention after an October 1913 game against Colgate University. Colgate led 6–0 with ten seconds left to play, when Prichard sprinted 70 yards for a touchdown to lead Army to a 7–6 victory.

Throughout his football career at West Point, Prichard's favorite receiver was Louis A. Merrilat from Chicago. The passing team of "Prichard to Merrilat" was one of the first great passing combinations in college football. The Prichard-Merrilat combination gained national fame after the 1913 Army–Navy Game, played in New York before a crowd of 40,000 at the Polo Grounds. Army had not defeated Navy since 1905, and Navy was undefeated and favored to beat Army by odds of 6–1. Although Navy had allowed only seven points in its other games in 1913, Prichard and Merrilat teamed up to lead Army to a 22–9 win, with Prichard throwing two touchdown passes to Merrilat. The crowd reportedly left the Polo Grounds chanting, "Prichard-to-Merillat, Prichard-to-Merillat ..." over and over again.

On the train trip back to West Point after the 1913 Navy game, the football team elected Prichard as the captain of the 1914 football team. A newspaper report announcing his election noted:

The football squad elected its next year's captain on the train trip home. They chose Cadet Vernon E. Prichard of the second class as their leader. Cadet Prichard has played quarterback on the team for two seasons and got in every game except one on the army's schedule this season. His brilliant forward passing, spectacular open field running and excellent generalship have made him one of the season's leading quarterbacks. ... His election was unanimous. He is a color sergeant in the cadet battalion and popular with his teammates and fellow cadets.

In 1914, Prichard led Army to an undefeated 9–0 season. In the final game of the season, Army defeated Navy, 20–0, as Prichard finished his college football career by throwing passes to Merrilat and Bob Neyland, who later became the football coach at the University of Tennessee. At the end of the season, Prichard was selected as a first-team All-American quarterback.

At West Point, Prichard was known to his fellow cadets by the nicknames "Prich" and "Nigger". A profile of Prichard in a West Point yearbook noted:

It's hard to tell the truth about Prich for no one knows just what it is. Some move him right up beside St. Peter and hand him a 'New Model Harp' with printed directions for playing, while others give him a dog's name and call him Nigger. But wherever you rank him, it's a safe bet that he'll feel right at home. He'll borrow his Satanic Majesty's opera cloak for the first night or slap the old Saint on the back and ask him for Bull and papers."

== Military career ==
=== Early years ===
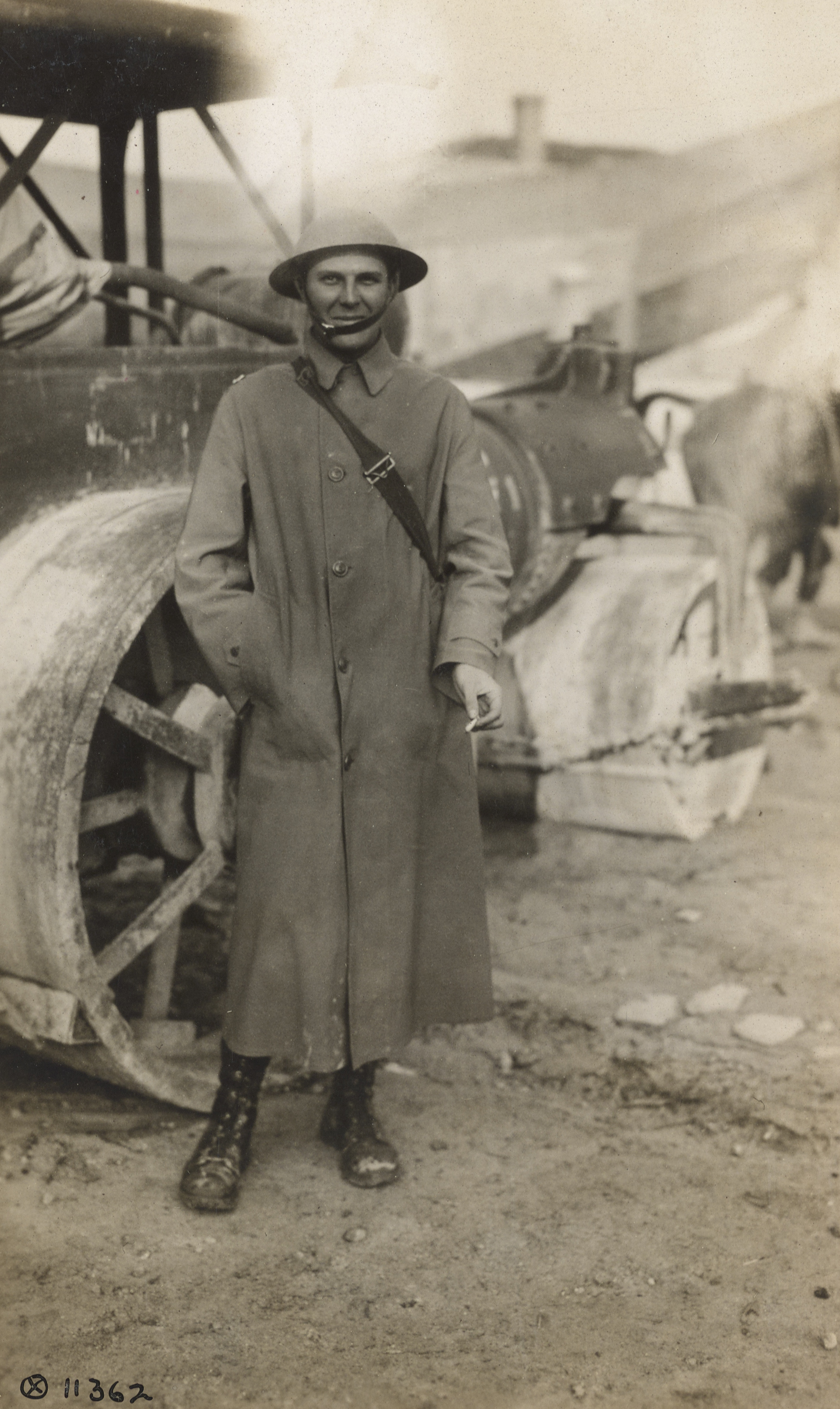
Captain V. E. Prichard when he was serving as an aide-de-camp to Major General Omar Bundy, France, April 1918.

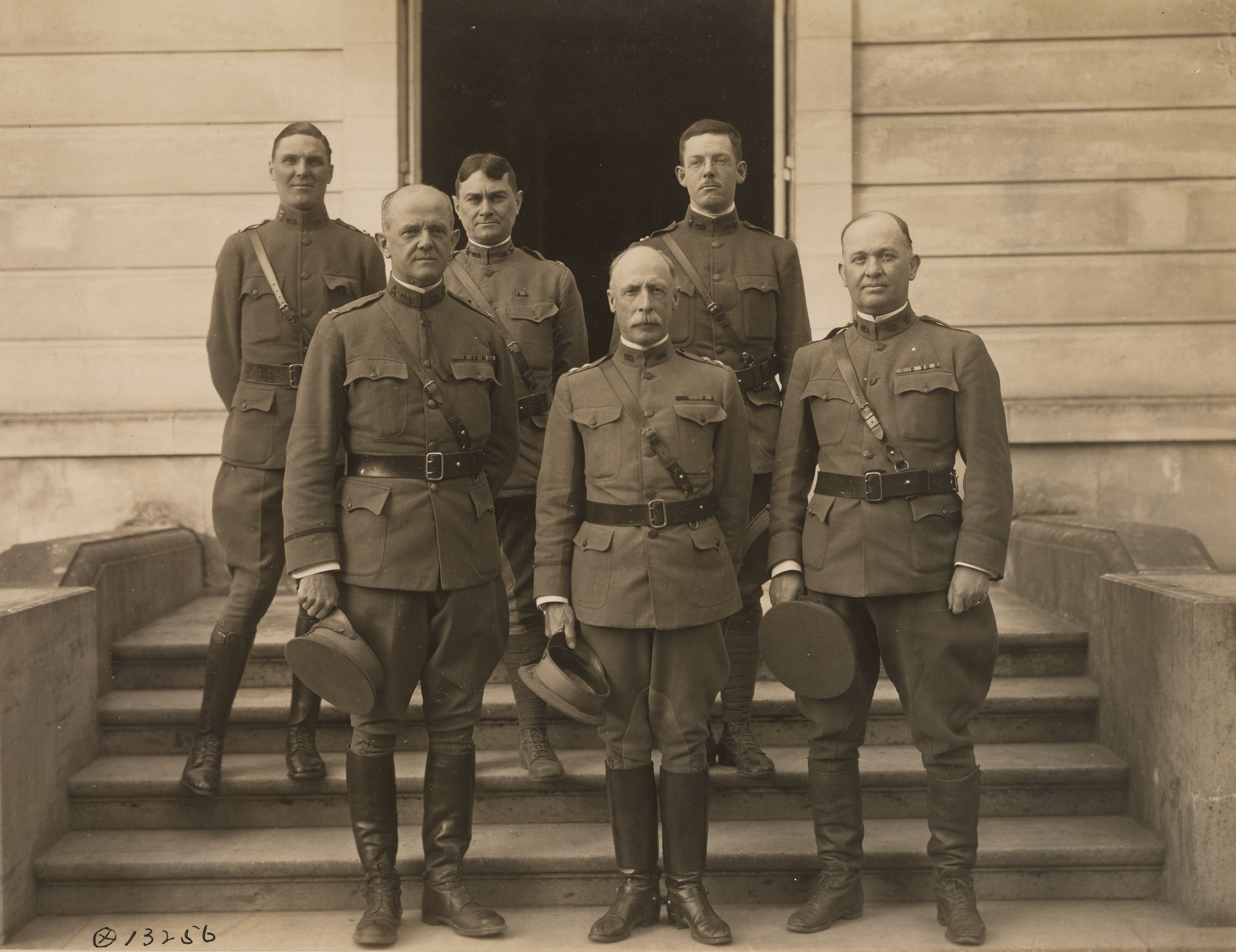
Major General Omar Bundy (center), commanding the 2nd Division, Captain V. E. Prichard, Bundy's aide-de-camp, and other members of the division staff, pictured here at Chaumont-en-Vexin, France, May 28, 1918.

Upon graduating, 134th in his class of 164, from the Academy in June 1915, Prichard received the rank of second lieutenant and was assigned to the 1st Infantry Regiment. He served at Eagle Pass, Texas, from September 1915 to April 1916 and participated in the Pancho Villa Expedition into Mexico from April to August 1916. While serving in Mexico, Prichard was promoted to the rank of first lieutenant. Prichard returned to West Point for temporary duty during the fall of 1916 but returned to Mexico from December through February 1917.

=== World War I ===
In May 1917, a month following the American entry into World War I, Prichard was promoted to the rank of captain of the Infantry Branch. He sailed for the Western Front via England on January 8, 1918. He entered Germany with the Army of Occupation via Belgium and Luxembourg and served in Germany and France through June 1919.

=== World War II ===
Prichard remained lifelong friends with his backfield partner, Dwight D. "Ike" Eisenhower. Eisenhower later recalled that he looked for "natural leaders" from the ranks of football. Eisenhower believed that football, more than any other sport, instilled the belief that victory comes from teamwork and dedication. He identified Prichard as one of the officers with football background who had "measured up" during the war.

Choosing to remain in the army in the period between the wars, he attended the United States Army War College from September 1939 until June 1940.

During World War II, Prichard served as the Commanding Officer (CO) of the 27th Field Artillery Regiment from 1940–41, and received a promotion to colonel in the Army of the United States (AUS) on April 26, 1941. He served as chief of staff of the 4th Armored Division from 1941–42. On February 16, 1942 he was promoted to the rank of brigadier general (AUS). and was again promoted, on September 9, to major general (AUS). At the same time he was made Commanding General (CG) of the 14th Armored Division, a post he held until July 1944. From July 1944 until September 1945, after the end of World War II in Europe, he was the CG of the 1st "Old Ironsides" Armored Division during the Italian campaign, including the Battle of the Gothic Line, Po Valley and the Spring 1945 offensive in Italy.

Prichard and Eisenhower exchanged correspondence during the war. Shortly after the United States entered the war, in December 1941, Eisenhower wrote a letter to Prichard in which he confided, "this is a long tough road we have to travel." In an oft-quoted passage, Eisenhower continued his comments to Prichard, noting that, "men that can do things are going to be sought out just as surely as the sun rises in the morning," and, "fake reputations, habits of glib and clever speech, and glittering surface performances are going to be discovered."

During the Battle of the Bulge in late December 1944, Prichard wrote to Eisenhower, reminding him of what their football coach had taught them: "If things break badly or go against you -- stay with it all the harder." Eisenhower's biographer, Matthew Holland, later wrote that Eisenhower had learned important lessons on the football playing field at West Point, and concluded: "World War II was won on the playing fields of West Point, and Ike would prove to be the quarterback of the winning team."

After World War II, Prichard became the Chief of the Army Public Information Division. In February 1949, President Harry S. Truman promoted Prichard from the permanent rank of brigadier general to major general.

== Death and funeral ==
Prichard was killed in a yacht explosion in July 1949. He was part of a group that had boarded the yacht Halcyon for a picnic cruise on the Potomac River in Washington, D.C. The craft was within yards of the dock at the Corinthian Yacht Club when an explosion destroyed the vessel. Prichard was thrown into the Potomac and killed instantly. Navy Commodore Wilfred Painter was also killed in the blast. Philadelphia soldier, diplomat and socialite Col. Anthony Joseph Drexel Biddle, Jr. dove into the Potomac in an effort to save Prichard and recovered his body.

Prichard's funeral was held at the chapel of Fort Myer, adjacent to Arlington National Cemetery. The Army's chief of chaplains officiated at the funeral, and the honorary pallbearers included Secretary of the Army, Gordon Gray, and classmates from the West Point class of 1915, including Dwight Eisenhower.

== Decorations ==
Below is the ribbon bar of Major General Vernon Prichard:

1st Row	Army Distinguished Service Medal	Legion of Merit	Mexican Service Medal	World War I Victory Medal with three Battle Clasps
2nd Row	Army of Occupation of Germany Medal	American Defense Service Medal	American Campaign Medal	European-African-Middle Eastern Campaign Medal with five service stars
3rd Row	World War II Victory Medal	Army of Occupation Medal	Honorary Companion of the Order of the Bath	Officer of the French Order of the Legion of Honour
4th Row	French Croix de guerre 1939-1945 with Palm	Officer of the Italian Order of Saints Maurice and Lazarus	Brazilian War Medal	Czechoslovak War Cross 1939-1945

== See also ==
- 1914 College Football All-America Team

== Bibliography ==
- Holland, Matthew F. (2001). Eisenhower Between the Wars: The Making of a General and Statesman. Praeger Publishers. ISBN 0-275-96340-3.

Military offices
Preceded by Newly activated organization	Commanding General 14th Armored Division; 1942–1944	Succeeded by Albert C. Smith
Preceded by Ernest N. Harmon	Commanding General 1st Armored Division; 1944–1945	Succeeded by Post deactivated
