= 1914 All-Eastern football team =

American all-star college football team

The 1914 All-Eastern football team consists of American football players chosen by various selectors as the best players at each position among the Eastern colleges and universities during the 1914 college football season.

== All-Eastern selections ==
=== Quarterbacks ===
- Charley Barrett, Cornell (BE-1; WC-1)
- Vernon Prichard, Army (DS-1)
- Alex Wilson, Yale (BE-2)

=== Halfbacks ===
- Eddie Mahan, Harvard (BE-1; WC-1; DS-1)
- Frederick Bradlee, Harvard (BE-2; DS-1)
- Johnny Spiegel, Washington & Jefferson (BE-1)
- Charles Brickley, Harvard (WC-1)
- Andrew Toolan, Williams (BE-2)
- Lorin Solon, Minnesota (BE-2)

=== Fullbacks ===
- Harry LeGore, Yale (BE-1; WC-1)
- Red Fleming, Washington & Jefferson (DS-1)
- Lawrence Whitney, Dartmouth (BE-2)
- Francke, Harvard (BE-2)

=== Ends ===
- Huntington Hardwick, Harvard (BE-1; WC-1; DS-1)
- John O'Hearn, Cornell (BE-1)
- T. J. Coolidge, Harvard (WC-1)
- Louis A. Merrilat, Army (DS-1)
- Alexander Telfer, Dartmouth (BE-2)
- Maurice Brann, Yale (BE-2)

=== Tackles ===
- Harold Ballin, Princeton (BE-1; WC-1; DS-1)
- Bud Talbott, Yale (BE-1; WC-1)
- Walter H. Trumbull, Harvard (BE-2; DS-1)
- Chester A. Pudrith, Dartmouth (BE-2)

=== Guards ===
- Stan Pennock, Harvard (BE-1; WC-1; DS-1)
- Edward Trenkmann, Princeton (BE-1)
- Clarence Spears, Dartmouth (WC-1)
- Conroy, Yale (DS-1)
- Shenk, Princeton (BE-2)
- Gottschalk, Brown (BE-2)

=== Centers ===
- Albert Journay, Penn (BE-1)
- Burleigh Cruikshank, Washington & Jefferson (WC-1)
- McElwan, Army (DS-1)
- Carl White, Yale (BE-2)

== Key ==
- BE = Brooklyn Eagle
- WC = Wilmer G. Crowell, head coach of Lafayette
- DS = Daniel Isom Sultan, Army coaching staff

== See also ==
- 1914 College Football All-America Team
