= 1914 All-Western Conference football team =

The 1914 All-Western Conference football team consists of American football players selected to the all-conference team for the Western Conference, later known as the Big Ten Conference, as chosen by various selectors for the 1914 college football season.

== All-Western Conference selections ==
=== Ends ===
- Boyd Cherry, Ohio State (WE-1)
- George K. Squier, Illinois (WE-1)
- Perry Graves, Illinois (WE-2)
- Sanderson, Iowa (WE-2)

=== Tackles ===
- Cub Buck, Wisconsin (WE-1)
- Laurens Shull, Chicago (WE-1)
- Ray Keeler, Wisconsin (WE-2)
- Lennox F. Armstrong, Illinois (WE-2)

=== Guards ===
- Ralph Chapman, Illinois (WE-1)
- H. B. Routh, Purdue (WE-1)
- Arlie Mucks, Wisconsin (WE-2)
- Herman Stegeman, Chicago (WE-2)

=== Centers ===
- Paul Des Jardien, Chicago (WE-1) (CFHOF)
- Boles Rosenthal, Minnesota (WE-2)

=== Quarterbacks ===
- George Clark, Illinois (WE-1)
- Pete Russell, Chicago (WE-2)

=== Halfbacks ===
- Harold Pogue, Illinois (WE-1)
- Wilbur Hightower, Northwestern (WE-1)
- Gray, Chicago (WE-2)

=== Fullbacks ===
- Lorin Solon, Minnesota (WE-1)
- Eugene Schobinger, Illinois (WE-2)

== Key ==
WE = Walter Eckersall

== See also ==
- 1914 College Football All-America Team
- 1914 All-Western college football team
