= Walter Trumbull (disambiguation) =

Walter Trumbull is the name of:

- Walter Trumbull, American explorer
- Walter H. Trumbull, American football player
- Walter S. Trumbull, American sportswriter
