= 1914 All-America college football team =

Official list of the best college football players of 1914

The 1914 All-America college football team is composed of college football players who were selected as All-Americans for the 1914 college football season. The only selectors for the 1914 season who have been recognized as "official" by the National Collegiate Athletic Association (NCAA) are Walter Camp, whose selections were published in Collier's Weekly, and the International News Service (INS), a newswire founded by William Randolph Hearst.

Although not recognized by the NCAA, many other sports writers, newspapers, and coaches selected All-America teams in 1914. They include Vanity Fair, Parke H. Davis, Walter Eckersall, The New York Globe, the New York Herald, the New York Evening Mail, the Atlanta Constitution, the Detroit Evening News, The Boston Post, and The Philadelphia Inquirer.

== Overview ==
Harvard end Huntington Hardwick was the only player who was unanimously selected as a first-team All-American by all 27 selectors identified below. Other players selected as a first-team All-American by a majority of the selectors were Harvard halfback Eddie Mahan (26 selections), Harvard guard Stan Pennock (26 selections), Princeton tackle Harold Ballin (22 selections), Michigan halfback John Maulbetsch (20 selections), Cornell quarterback Charley Barrett (19 selections), and Dartmouth guard Clarence Spears (16 selections). The Los Angeles Times reported that "Maulbetsch, Michigan's hero, is about the only one of 1914's stars who received an almost unanimous vote."

The chart below reflects the number of polls in which the leading candidates (any player with at least two first-team All-American designations) were selected as first-team All-Americans.

Name	Position	School	First-team selections
Huntington Hardwick	End	Harvard	27
Eddie Mahan	Halfback	Harvard	26
Stan Pennock	Guard	Harvard	26
Harold Ballin	Tackle	Princeton	22
John Maulbetsch	Halfback	Michigan	20
Charley Barrett	Quarterback	Cornell	19
Clarence Spears	Guard	Dartmouth	16
Louis A. Merrilat	End	Army	12
Harry LeGore	Fullback	Yale	9
Bud Talbott	Tackle	Yale	9
John McEwan	Center	Army	8
Paul Des Jardien	Center	Chicago	8
Johnny Spiegel	Halfback	Washington & Jefferson	8
Lawrence Whitney	Fullback	Dartmouth	7
John O'Hearn	End	Cornell	7
Burleigh Cruikshank	Center	Washington & Jefferson	6
Britain Patterson	Tackle	Washington & Jefferson	6

== All-Americans of 1914 ==
=== Ends ===
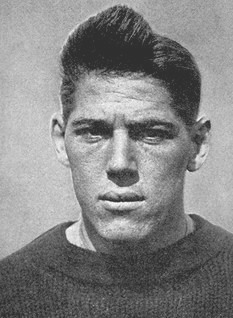
Harvard end Tack Hardwick.

- **Huntington "Tack" Hardwick**, Harvard (College Football Hall of Fame) (WC–1; VF; PHD; WE–1; FM-1; MO-1; NYH; NYEM-1; NYG; NC; PGT; BN; PEB; AC; PS; WH; DD; PET; SLT; MD; NES; DN; PPL; BP; TT; AW; PI; OUT)
- Louis A. Merrilat, Army (WE–1; VF; PHD; WC-2; FM-3; MO-2; NYH; NYEM-2; NYG; NC; PGT; BN; PEB; AC; NES; TT; OUT)
- **John E. O'Hearn**, Cornell (WC–1; WE–2; MO-1; NYEM-2; PS; PET; SLT; MD; DN; OUT)
- Maurice R. "Red" Brann, Yale (WC–2; WH; BP; AW)
- Bob Higgins, Penn State (College Football Hall of Fame) (NYEM-1; PPL)
- **Perry Graves**, Illinois (FM–1)
- Reginald Bovill, Washington & Jefferson (FM-3; MO-2; DD)
- Boyd Cherry, Ohio State (FM–2; OUT)
- Thomas Jefferson Coolidge, Harvard (FM–2)
- Harvey E. Overesch, Navy (WC–3)
- Edwin Stavrum, Wisconsin (OUT)
- Robbie Robinson, Auburn (OUT)

=== Tackles ===
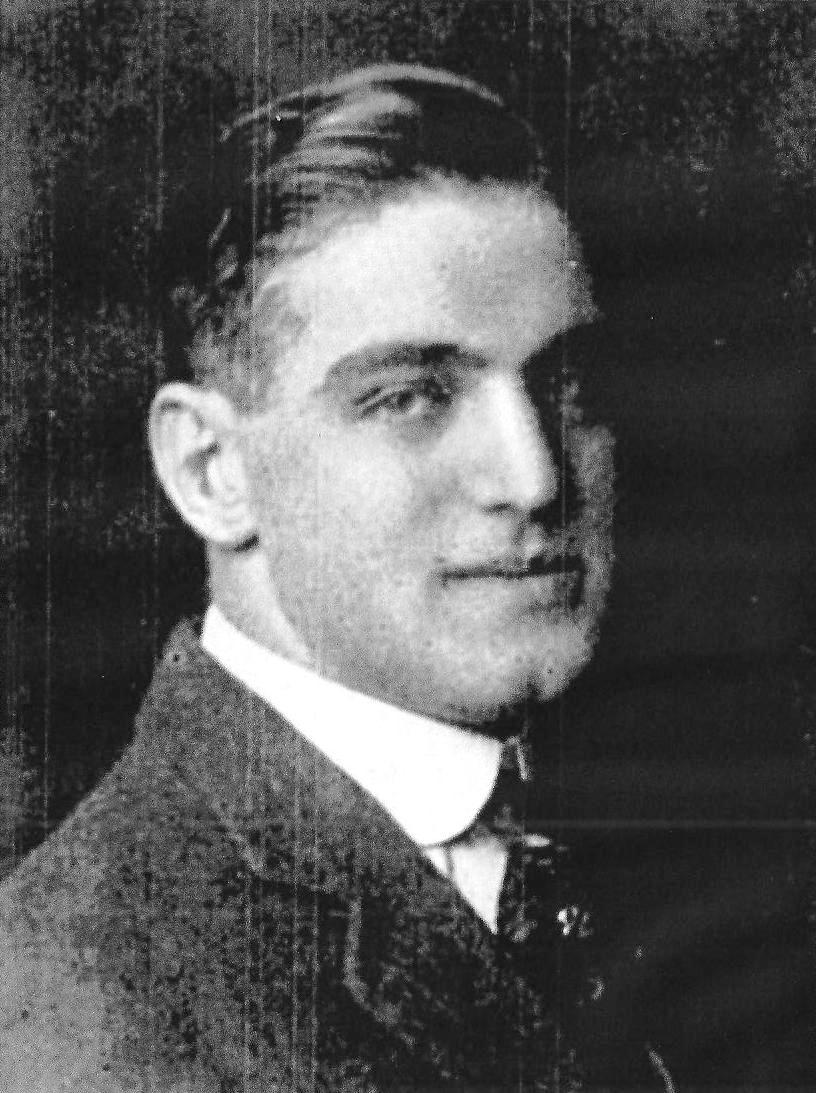
Princeton tackle Harold Ballin.

- **Harold Ballin**, Princeton (College Football Hall of Fame) (WC–1; VF; PHD; WE–1; FM-1; MO-1; NYH; NYEM-1; NYG; NC; BN; AC; PS; WH; SLT; MD; NES; DN; BP; TT; AW; PI; OUT)
- Bud Talbott, Yale (WE–1; VF; MO-1; NYH; NYEM-2; BN; AC; WH; DD; PET; OUT)
- Britain Patterson, Washington & Jefferson (WC–2; FM-3; PEB; PS; PET; PPL; BP; TT)
- **Walter Trumbull**, Harvard (WC–1; PHD; DD; DN; AW; PI; OUT)
- Vic Halligan, Nebraska (WC–3; WE–2; FM-1; PGT; MD; OUT)
- Cub Buck, Wisconsin (WE–2; PGT; SLT; OUT)
- John Toohey, Rutgers (NYEM-1; NYG; NC; NES)
- Pete Maxfield, Lafayette (MO-2; PEB)
- Ted Shultz, Washington & Lee (PPL)
- Alex Weyand, Army (College Football Hall of Fame) (WC–3; FM-2)
- Bob Nash, Rutgers (College Football Hall of Fame) (WC–2)
- Ray Keeler Wisconsin (FM–2; OUT)
- Edward J. Gallogly, Cornell (NYEM-2)
- George D. Howell, Trinity College (MO-2)
- Lennox F. Armstrong, Illinois (FM-3)
- Will Burton, Kansas (OUT)
- Laurens Shull, Chicago (OUT)
- Josh Cody, Vanderbilt (College Football Hall of Fame) (OUT)
- Farmer Kelly, Tennessee (OUT)
- Bob Taylor Dobbins, Sewanee (OUT)

=== Guards ===
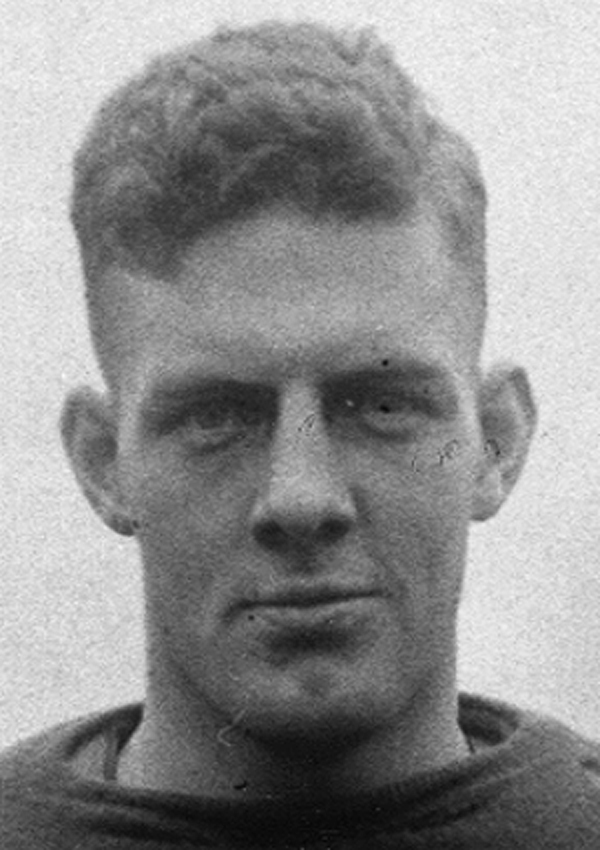
Illinois guard Ralph Chapman.

- **Stan Pennock**, Harvard (College Football Hall of Fame) (WC–1; VF; PHD; WE–1; FM-2; MO-1; NYH; NYEM-1; NYG; NC; PGT; BN; PEB; AC; PS; WH; DD; PET; SLT; MD; NES; DN; PPL; BP; TT; AW; PI; OUT)
- **Clarence Spears**, Dartmouth (WC–3; WE–1; FM-1; NYH; NYEM-1; NYG; NC; PGT; BN; PEB; PS; DD; NES; PPL; BP; AW; PI)
- **Ralph Chapman**, Illinois (WC–1; PHD; WE–2; FM-2; AC; SLT; MD; OUT)
- Eddie Trenkmann, Princeton (MO-2; PET; TT)
- Wilbur Shenk, Princeton (WC-2; VF; NYEM-2; OUT)
- Arlie Mucks, Wisconsin (FM–1)
- Michalis Dorizas, Penn(FM–1)
- Harry Routh, Purdue (FM-3; DN)
- Louis Jordan, Texas (WC-2)
- Joseph J. "Red" O'Hare, Army (WE-2)
- Harold White, Syracuse (NYEM-2; OUT)
- Earl W. Mills, Navy (MO-2)
- Laurence B. Meacham, Army (WC–3)
- Dale Munsick, Cornell (FM-3)

=== Centers ===
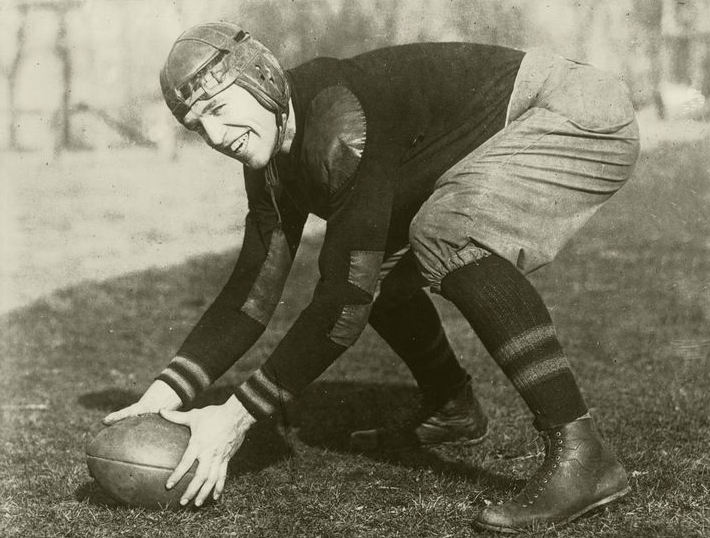
Army center John McEwan

- **John McEwan**, Army (WC–1; WE-1; MO-2; NYG-1; PS; SLT; DN; BP; AW)
- Paul Des Jardien, Chicago (College Football Hall of Fame) (WC–2; VF; FM-2; MO-1; PGT; BN; AC; DD; MD; TT; OUT)
- Burleigh Cruikshank, Washington & Jefferson (WC-3; FM-3; NYH; NYEM-2; NC; PEB; WH; PET; PPL)
- Albert Journeay, Penn (PHD; WE-2; NYEM-1; WH [g]; NES; PI; OUT)
- Bob Peck, Pittsburgh (College Football Hall of Fame) (FM–1)
- Boles Rosenthal, Minnesota (OUT)
- Willard Cool, Cornell (OUT)
- James Raynsford, Michigan (OUT)
- Boozer Pitts, Auburn (OUT)

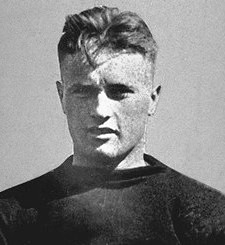
Cornell quarterback Charley Barrett.

=== Quarterbacks ===
- **Charley Barrett**, Cornell (College Football Hall of Fame) (WC–2; VF; WE–1; FM-1; NYH; NYEM-1; NYG [hb]; BN; PEB; AC; PS; WH; DD; PET; MD; NES; DN; PPL; TT; AW; OUT)
- Milt Ghee, Dartmouth (WC–1; WE–2; FM-2; MO-1; NYEM-2; BP; PI)
- Vernon Prichard, Army (NYG; NC; PGT; SLT; OUT)
- Alexander D. Wilson, Yale (WC-3; OUT)
- Potsy Clark, Illinois (FM-3; OUT)
- Huntley, New York (MO-2)
- David Paddock, Georgia (PHD; OUT)
- Malcolm Justin Logan, Harvard (OUT)
- Frank Glick, Princeton (OUT)
- William H. Tow, Amherst (OUT)
- Irby Curry, Vanderbilt (OUT)
- Robert Kent Gooch, Virginia (OUT)
- Paul Russell, Chicago (OUT)
- Tommy Hughitt, Michigan (OUT)
- Sammy Gross, Iowa (OUT)
- Wilbur Hightower, Northwestern (OUT)
- Louis E. Pickerel, Ohio State (OUT)

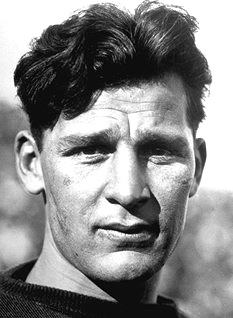
Michigan halfback John Maulbetsch

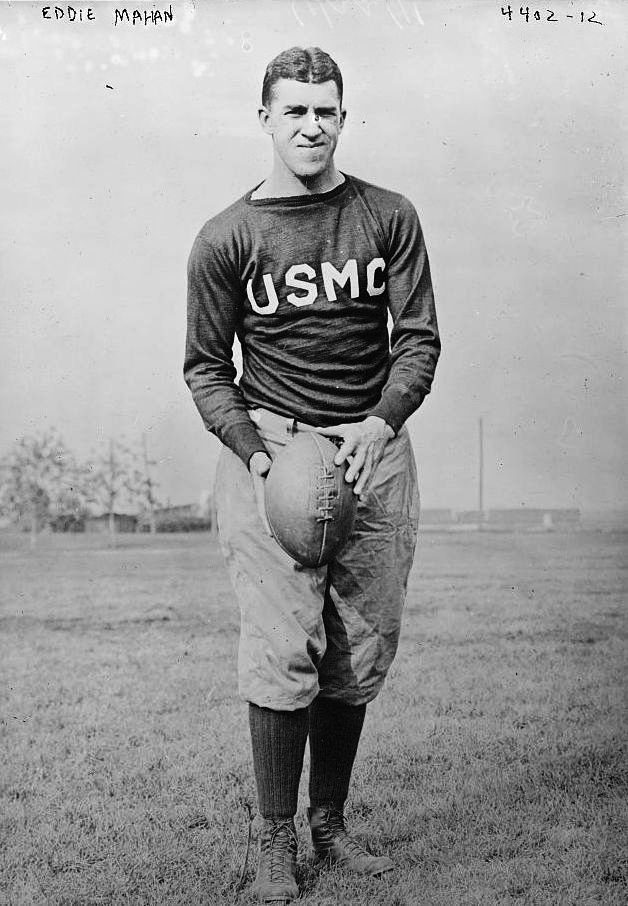
Harvard halfback Eddie Mahan

=== Halfbacks ===
- **John Maulbetsch**, Michigan (College Football Hall of Fame) (WC–1; VF [fb]; PHD; WE–1; FM-1; MO-1; PGT [fb]; BN; AC; PS; DD; PET; SLT; MD; NES; DN; PPL; BP; AW; PI; OUT)
- **Eddie Mahan**, Harvard (College Football Hall of Fame) (WC-1 [fb]; VF; PHD; WE–1; FM-2; MO-1; NYH; NYEM-1; NYG; NC; PGT; BN; PEB; AC [fb]; PS; WH [fb]; DD; PET; SLT; MD [fb]; NES; DN [fb]; PPL; BP [fb]; TT; AW [fb]; PI; OUT)
- **Johnny Spiegel**, Washington & Jefferson (WC–2; VF; PHD; FM-1; NYH; NYEM-1; AC; DN; AW)
- Frederick Bradlee, Harvard (WC–1; WE-2; NYEM-2; WH; BP; TT; OUT)
- Harold Pogue, Illinois (WC–3; WE-2; FM-3; PGT; MD; OUT)
- William "Billy" Cahall, Lehigh (WC-2; MO-2)
- Howard Parker Talman, Rutgers (WC–3)
- William H. Miller, Pittsburgh (FM-3)
- Andrew Toolan, Williams (MO-2; OUT)
- Dick Rutherford, Nebraska (OUT)
- Guy Chamberlain, Nebraska (OUT)
- Tam Rose, Syracuse (OUT)
- Marcus Wilkinson, Syracuse (OUT)
- Carroll Knowles, Yale (OUT)
- Moore, Princeton (OUT)
- Eugene Mayer, Virginia (OUT)
- Gray, Chicago (OUT)
- Bart Macomber, Illinois (OUT)
- Ammie Sikes, Vanderbilt (OUT)
- Lee Tolley, Sewanee (OUT)
- Dave Tayloe, North Carolina (OUT)

=== Fullbacks ===
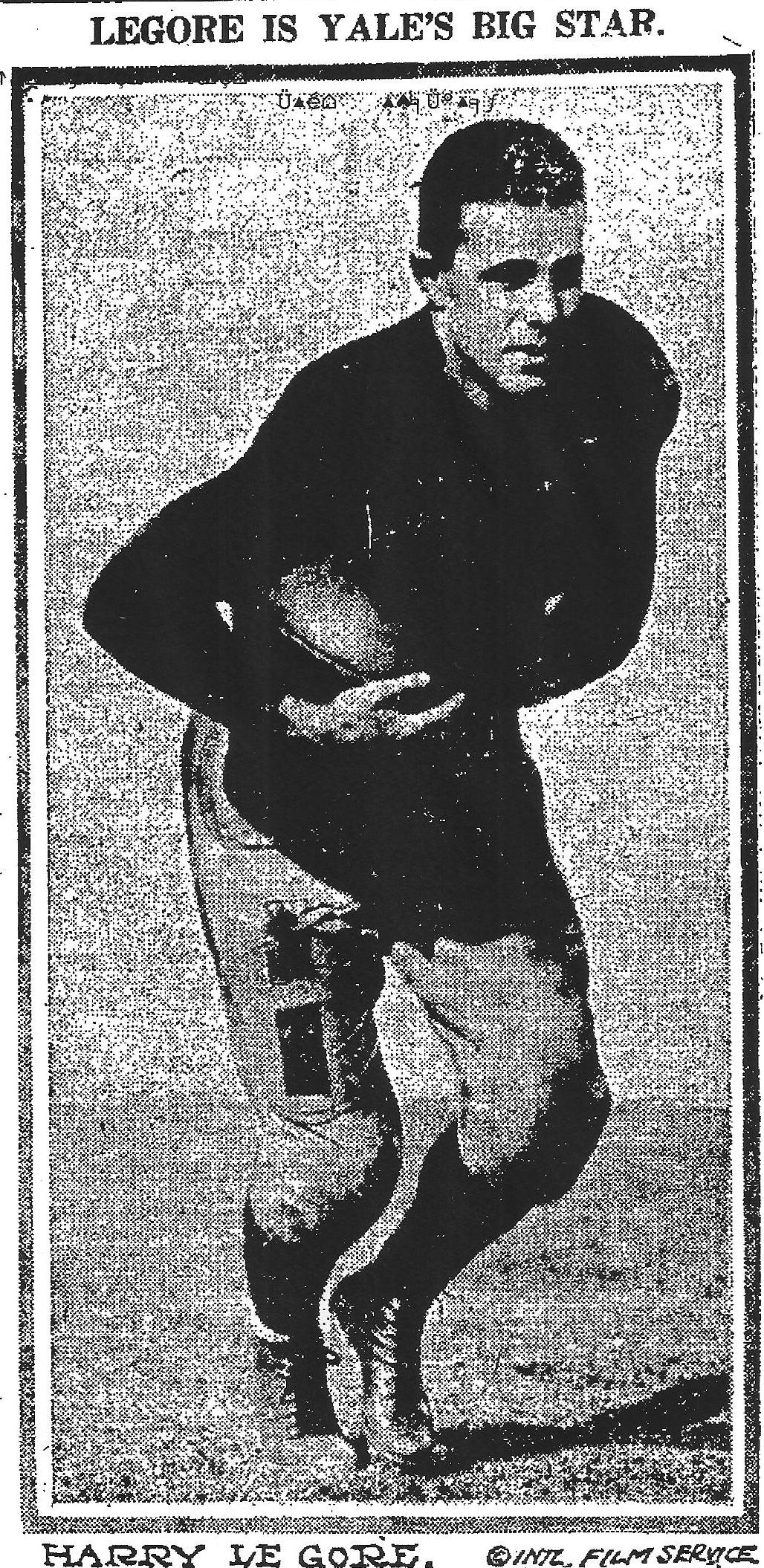
Yale fullback Harry LeGore

- **Harry LeGore**, Yale (WC–2; WE–2; FM-1; MO-1; NYH; NYEM-1; PS; WH [hb]; PET; TT; PI; OUT)
- Lawrence Whitney, Dartmouth (WC–3; WE–1; FM-2 [hb]; NYEM-2 [hb]; NYG; NC [hb]; PEB [hb]; SLT; NES; PPL; OUT)
- Lorin Solon, Minnesota (WC–3 [end]; WE–2 [end]; FM–2; BN; DD; OUT)
- Ray Eichenlaub, Notre Dame (College Football Hall of Fame) (MO-2; NC)
- Haps Benfer, Albright (PEB; OUT)
- Hugo Franck, Harvard (NYEM-2)
- Charles Shuler, Jr., Cornell (FM-3)
- Pete Calac, Carlisle (OUT)
- Dan Kenan, Wesleyan (OUT)
- Carl Philippi, Cornell (OUT)
- Campbell "Honus" Graf, Ohio State (OUT)
- Charles Brickley, Harvard (OUT)

=== Key ===
NCAA recognized selectors for 1914

- WC = Collier's Weekly as selected by Walter Camp
- FM = Frank G. Menke, Sporting Editor of the I.N.S.

Other selectors

- VF = Vanity Fair, selected based on selections of 175 "prominent newspapermen of the country"
- PHD = Parke H. Davis, member of rules committee and noted football historian
- WE = Walter Eckersall, of the Chicago Tribune
- MO = Monty, New York sports writer
- NYH = New York Herald
- NYEM = James P. Sinnot, of the New York Evening Mail, "who is recognized as one of the best sporting writers in the East"
- NYG = New York Globe, selected by Mack Whalen
- NC = Newark Sunday Call, selected by William S. Hunt
- PGT = Pittsburgh Gazette-Times, selected by Fred M. Walker
- BN = Baltimore News
- PEB = Philadelphia Evening Bulletin
- AC = Atlanta Constitution, selected by sporting editor Dick Jemison
- PS = Pittsburgh Sun, selected by sporting editor James J. Long
- WH = Washington Herald, selected by William Peet
- DD = Davis J. Davies in the Pittsburgh Dispatch
- PET = Philadelphia Evening Telegraph, selected by sporting editor Louis M. Toughill
- SLT = St. Louis Times, selected by George Henger
- MD = Michigan Daily, selected by sporting editor F.M. Church
- NES = Newark Evening Star, selected by sporting editor Joseph P. Norton
- DN = Detroit Evening News, selected by sporting editor H.G. Salsinger
- PPL = Philadelphia Public Ledger, selected by Robert W. Maxwell
- BP = Boston Post, by Charles H. Parker
- TT = Tom Thorp in the New York Evening Journal
- AW = Alexander Wilson, Yale University
- PI = Philadelphia Inquirer, selected by sporting editor M. Neagle Rawlins
- OUT = Outing magazine's "FOOTBALL ROLL OF HONOR: The Men Whom the Best Coaches of the Country Have Named as the Stars of the Gridiron in 1914"

Bold = Consensus All-American

- 1 – First-team selection
- 2 – Second-team selection
- 3 – Third-team selection

== See also ==
- 1914 All-Eastern football team
- 1914 College Football All-Southern Team
- 1914 All-Western college football team
- 1914 All-Western Conference football team
