= Harold Pogue =

American football player and businessman (1893–1969)

Illinois Fighting Illini
- Positions: Halfback, Quarterback

Personal information
- Born: November 25, 1893; Sullivan, Illinois, U.S.
- Died: October 23, 1969 (aged 75); Decatur, Illinois, U.S.

Career information
- High school: Sullivan High School (Sullivan, Illinois) (1912)
- College: Illinois (1914)

Awards and highlights
- Third-team All-American (1914); First-team All-Western (1914)

Harold Pogue (November 25, 1893 – October 23, 1969) was an American football player and businessman. He played quarterback and halfback for Robert Zuppke's University of Illinois football teams and was selected as a first-team All-American in 1914. He later served as a member of the University of Illinois' Board of Trustees for 17 years.

== Biography ==
=== University of Illinois ===
Pogue was born in Sullivan, Illinois, and enrolled at the University of Illinois in 1912. As a freshman, Pogue was slightly built, weighed 142 pounds, and wore thick glasses. He tried out for the freshman football team as a quarterback, but he was cut from the team because he was too small.

In the spring of 1913, Illinois' head football coach Robert Zuppke saw Pogue compete at a track meet and invited him to football practice in the fall. He was Zuppke's starting quarterback in 1913. In the second week of the 1913 season, Pogue scored three touchdowns against the University of Missouri, leading a Chicago newspaper to write, "Pogue's performance stamps him as one of the greatest quarterbacks in Illinois history." In his fifth game for the Illini, Pogue returned a punt 65 yards for a touchdown against the University of Chicago at Stagg Field, but he suffered a shoulder injury that caused him to miss the remainder of the season.

In 1914, Pogue played at halfback and quarterback and helped lead Illinois to an undefeated season and Western Conference championship. He scored three touchdowns in Illinois' 37-0 victory over the Ohio State Buckeyes. In the 1914 game against Minnesota, scored two touchdowns and a 35-yard end run and a 75-yard interception return. In the final game of the 1914 season, Pogue returned two punts for touchdowns, including a 65-yard return. In all, Pogue scored eleven touchdowns in six games during the 1914 season. Chicago Tribune sports writer, and former All-American, Walter Eckersall, wrote that Pogue was "without doubt one of the most elusive runners since the days of Walter Steffen. He is fast and shifty, and can hit the line or run the ends with equal success. When used to receive forward passes Pogue probably is the most valuable man on his team."

At the end of the 1914 season, Pogue was selected as a first-team All-American halfback by the Pittsburgh-Gazette-Times and Michigan Daily, a second-team All-American by Walter Eckersall, and a third-team All-American by Walter Camp for Collier's Weekly and Frank G. Menke for the International News Service. Pogue and teammates Perry Graves and Ralph Chapman became the first University of Illinois football players to be selected as first-team All-Americans in 1914.

In 1915, Pogue suffered an ankle injury that resulted in his missing three games and did not score in two games after returning from his injury. Pogue registered a student group named the "Ku Klux Klan" as a student organization in 1915, although its idealistic relationship to the nationwide hate group is debated. Pogue graduated from the University of Illinois College of Commerce and Business Administration in 1916.

After his retirement, Coach Zuppke placed Pogue in the backfield with Red Grange as part of his all-time University of Illinois football team. Walter Eckersall picked Pogue as the greatest Illini football player in the era before Red Grange.

=== Later life ===
During World War I, Pogue served in the U.S. Army as a lieutenant. After the war, he went into the lumber business in Decatur, Illinois. He was the president of the Hunter Pogue Lumber Company from 1925 to 1959. He also served as president of the Pogue Development Company until his death in 1969.

Pogue remained active in the affairs of the University of Illinois, serving as a member of the university's board of trustees from 1935-1941 (having won election to a six year term in 1934) and 1959-1969 (having won election as a Democrat to six year terms in 1958 and 1964), president of the board of trustees from 1940–41, and president of the University of Illinois Alumni Association in 1952. He also served on the Decatur City Council from 1959 to 1963, as president of the Decatur Chamber of Commerce from 1953 to 19555, and as a director of the Illinois State Chamber of Commerce from 1957 to 1961. He was also considered as a possible Democratic candidate for Governor of Illinois in 1956.

In 1965, Pogue married Ramona Borders. Borders had known Pogue since she was seven years old and worked in the computer science field at the University of Illinois. She later said of Pogue, "He was a wonderful person. He loved horses and animals, and he loved sailing and helping people. We took mission construction groups to Haiti and Colombia and Honduras."

Pogue died in 1969 at his home in Decatur. His body was donated, at his request, to the University of Illinois Medical College.

== See also ==
- 1914 College Football All-America Team
- 1952 Illinois elections#Trustees of University of Illinois
