= Harry LeGore =

American politician

Harry W. LeGore
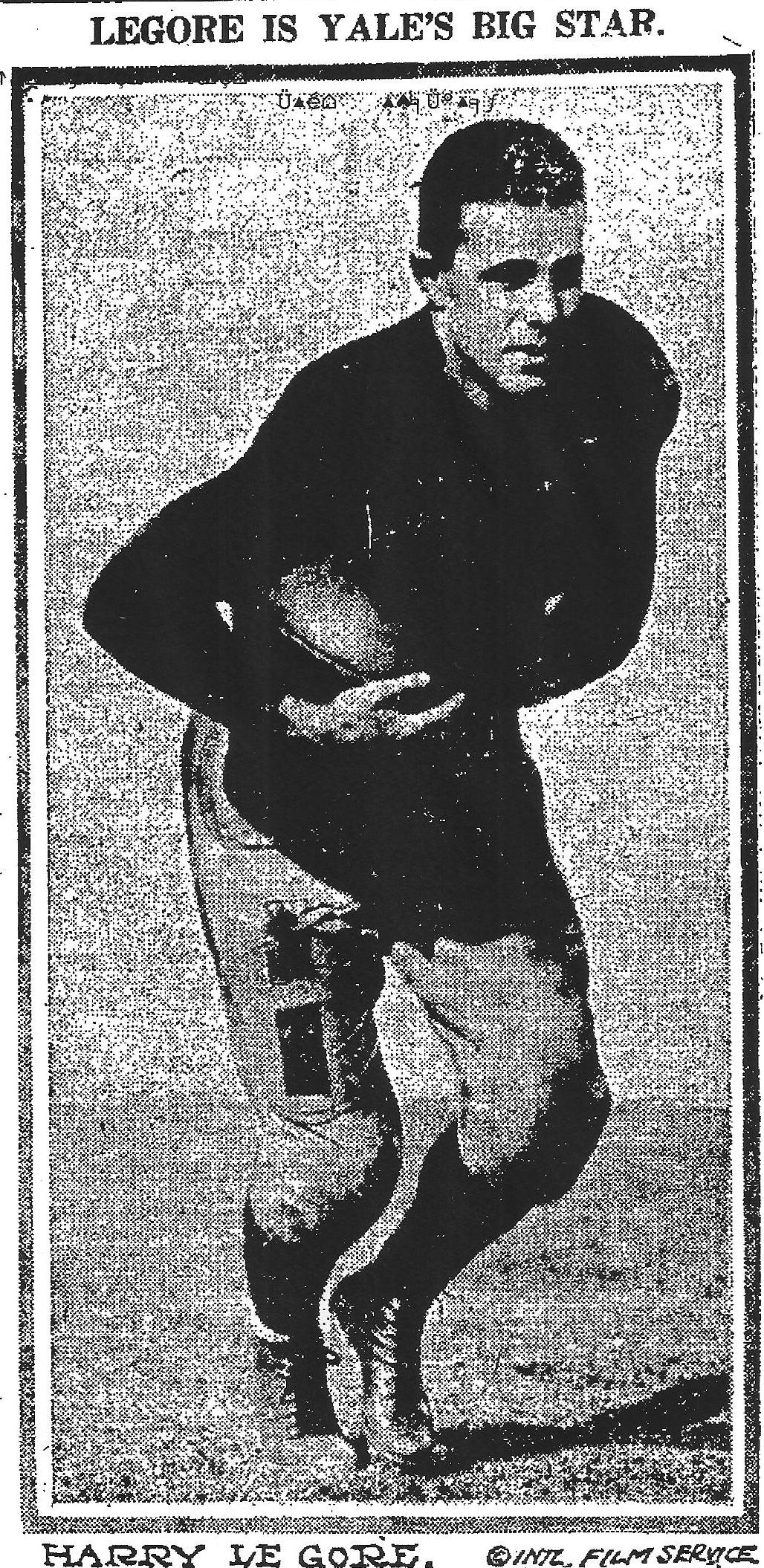

Yale Bulldogs
- Positions: Halfback, Fullback

Personal information
- Born: August 1, 1894; Frederick County, Maryland, U.S.
- Died: June 7, 1956 (aged 61); Frederick, Maryland, U.S.

Career information
- College: Yale (1914–1916)

Awards and highlights
- Consensus All-American (1914); Second-team All-American (1916)

Harry William LeGore (August 1, 1894 – June 7, 1956) was an American football and baseball player, Maryland state legislator and businessman.

== Biography ==
=== Early life ===
LeGore was born in Frederick County, Maryland. He was a son of the James William LeGore. His father founded the LeGore Lime Company in 1861 and built the LeGore Bridge near Woodsboro, Maryland. LeGore attended the Tome School, Mercersburg Academy and Lafayette College.

=== Yale ===
LeGore enrolled at Yale University where he played for the school's football, baseball and basketball teams and was a member of Skull and Bones.

In football, LeGore played halfback and fullback. He also handled punting duties and reportedly had a 65-yard average. American sports writer Grantland Rice once wrote that he wouldn't trade LeGore for Red Grange and added: "Harry never played a poor game in his life. He was always a competitor first, last and always — and always had a little more when the chips were down."

In 1914, LeGore was the starting fullback for a Yale football team that compiled a 7–2 record and defeated Notre Dame 28–0, ending Notre Dame's 27-game win streak. Knute Rockne later wrote in his autobiography: "I sat on the sideline at New Haven that Saturday and saw a good Yale team captained by Bud Talbott with a crack halfback named Harry LeGore leading the attack. They made Notre Dame look like a high school squad."

At the end of the 1914 season, LeGore was selected as a first-team All-American by International News Service sports editor Frank G. Menke, and as a second-team All-American by Walter Camp for Collier's Weekly and Walter Eckersall, of the Chicago Tribune.

LeGore also played shortstop for the Yale baseball team. In 1915, LeGore was ruled permanently ineligible to complete in college athletics after it was found that his food and lodging had been paid while playing summer baseball.

In 1916, LeGore's eligibility was restored. The Yale football team in 1915 had won only four games without LeGore in the lineup. With LeGore back in the lineup, the 1916 team went 8–1. A syndicated newspaper story about LeGore's return to Yale stated:

Harry Legore is the real shining light of the Eli football team, there isn't any doubt about that. Legore is the star, with a big 'S.' A couple of years ago Legore made a name for himself as an end runner and was the man who struck more terror to the hearts of 'Old Eli's opponents than any other man on the team. In the summer Legore played baseball, and someone said it was professional baseball with the result that Legore was barred from football as a 'professional.' Quite a sensation was created, but this year Legore was restored and it has been a mighty good thing for Yale that he was. And with his restoration to eligibility as an amateur athlete came the job of fullback on the Yale eleven."

At the end of the 1916 season, LeGore was selected as a second-team All-American by Walter Camp for Collier's Weekly, International News Service, Walter Eckersall of the Chicago Tribune, and Paul Purman, noted sports writer whose All-American team was syndicated in newspapers across the United States, and University of Michigan football coach Fielding H. Yost. In selecting LeGore as an All-American, Walter Camp called him "one of the nation's greatest athletes."

=== World War I ===
With the entry of the United States into World War I, LeGore was one of ten Yale students recommended by the President of Yale for commissions in the United States Marine Corps. LeGore served overseas for two years with the Second Division.

=== Business and political career ===
After his discharge from the Marines, LeGore worked for the LeGore Lime Company. In 1930, LeGore was elected to the Maryland House of Delegates as a member of the Republican Party. In 1934, he was elected to the Maryland State Senate. In 1936, he made an unsuccessful run for a seat in the U.S. House of Representatives. LeGore eventually became president of the LeGore Lime Company and also served as a director of the Potomac Edison Company.

=== Posthumous honors ===
In 1977, LeGore was inducted into Maryland's Alvin G. Quinn Memorial Sports Hall of Fame.

In 1999, The News-Post in Maryland picked LeGore as one of the Top 25 most significant sports figures in the history of Frederick County. He was the county's first athlete to be selected as a collegiate All-American.
