= John Toohey =

John Toohey may refer to:

- John Toohey (judge) (1930–2015), Australian judge
- John Toohey (politician) (1839–1903), Australian brewer and politician
- John Toohey (American football), American football player
- John Peter Toohey (1880–1946), American writer and publicist
- John Toohey (bishop) (died 1975), Australian Roman Catholic priest and bishop of Maitland
