= Vic Halligan =

American football player (1892–1973)

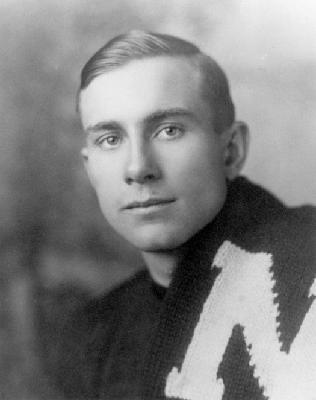

Profile
- Positions: Tackle, fullback

Personal information
- Born: November 22, 1892; Omaha, Nebraska, U.S.
- Died: March 10, 1973 (aged 80); Arizona, U.S.

Career information
- College: Nebraska

Awards and highlights
- First-team All-American (1914); Third-team All-American (1913); First-team All-Western (1914)

Victor H. Halligan (November 22, 1892 – March 10, 1973) was an American football player. He played for the University of Nebraska from 1912 to 1914 and was the first All-American football player to be selected from the Nebraska Cornhuskers football team.

== Biography ==
=== Early life ===
Halligan was born in Omaha, Nebraska, the son of John J. Halligan and Carrie (Swenson) Halligan. He graduated from North Platte High School before enrolling at the University of Nebraska.

=== University of Nebraska ===
At the University of Nebraska, Halligan played at the left tackle and fullback back positions for the Nebraska Cornhuskers football team from 1912 to 1914. He was also a member of the Phi Delta Theta fraternity. As a sophomore in 1912, he played at the fullback position and helped lead Nebraska to a 7–1 record. As a junior, Halligan was moved to the left tackle position and was one of the stars of Jumbo Stiehm's 1913 Nebraska Cornhuskers football team that won the Missouri Valley Conference championship and defeated the University of Minnesota to cap an undefeated 8–0 season. At the end of the 1913 season, Halligan was chosen as the captain of Nebraska's 1914 team. As a senior, Halligan again played at the left tackle position and led the 1914 Nebraska Cornhuskers football team to its second consecutive undefeated season with a record of 7–0–1. In Halligan's three seasons at Nebraska, the Cornhuskers put together a 14-game win streak and compiled a three-year record of 22–1–1. At the conclusion of the 1914 football season, Halligan became Nebraska's first All-American football player. He was selected as a first-team All-American by Frank G. Menke, sporting editor of the International News Service, the Pittsburgh Gazette-Times, and The Michigan Daily, a second-team All-American by Walter Eckersall of the Chicago Tribune and a third-team All-American by Walter Camp for Collier's Weekly. The University of Nebraska yearbook for the Class of 1915 noted Halligan's contributions to the football team: "The premier punter of the West, A master of the forward pass, A tackler equal to the best."

In 1915, Walter Camp again selected Halligan as a third-team All-American, though Halligan had already graduated and become a coach by the fall of 1915. Camp's error in choosing Halligan in 1915 was fodder for Western critics who complained that Camp made his selections without knowing the Western teams and players. The Milwaukee Journal in December 1915 wrote:

"This season, ... Camp picked Halligan of Nebraska for a tackle position on his third team. One would naturally think, then, that Halligan had been a bearcat -- some football player. But, it happens that Halligan graduated last June. ... He was a coach this season. Pretty good joke on Walter, eh, picking a coach as one of the star players of the country? Also, do you wonder why some folk don't put much stock in all-America teams?"

Halligan was inducted into the Nebraska Football Hall of Fame in 1973.

=== Legal career and military service ===
Halligan graduated from the University of Nebraska with a Bachelor of Arts degree in 1915 and a law degree in 1917. During World War I, he served in the U.S. Army field artillery. After the war, Halligan returned to North Platte, Nebraska, where he began a law practice. From 1919 to 1937, he practiced with the firm of Halligan, Beatty & Halligan. He became senior partner of law firm of McIntosh & Halligan in 1937 and retired in 1965.

=== Philanthropy and community activities ===
Halligan was a member of the Benevolent and Protective Order of Elks and served as the local organization's exalted ruler. He was also active in the American Legion and represented the State of Nebraska as a delegate to the American Legion convention in St. Louis. In his later years, he donated land on the north side of Interstate 80 east of Highway 83 that was used in the formation of Mid-Plains Community College. His hobbies included golf, hunting, and football.

=== Family and death ===
He married Louise Ottenstein in May 1920 at North Platte, Nebraska. The couple had two daughters, Marcia Ann and Jean Lucile. He died in Arizona in 1973 at age 80 and was buried at the North Platte Cemetery.
