= Perry Graves =

American football player (1889–1979)

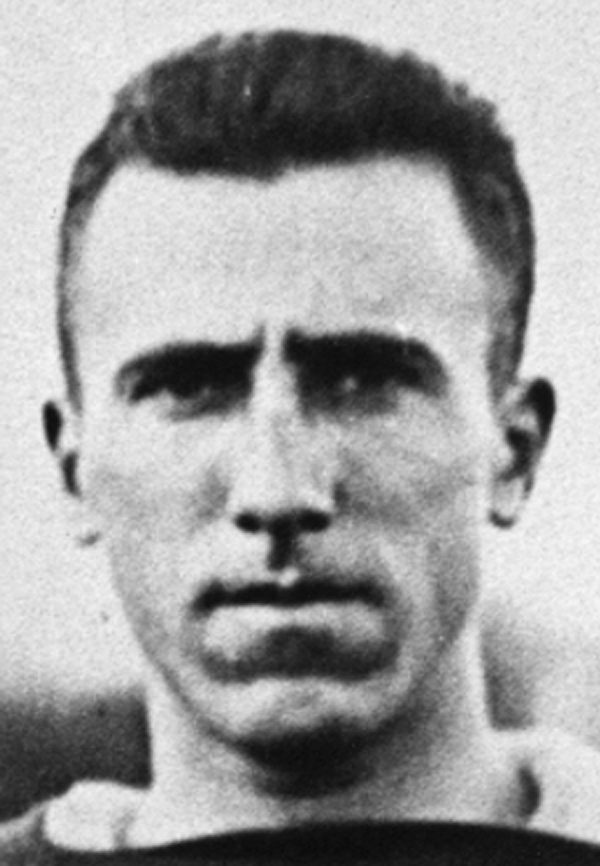

Illinois Fighting Illini
- Position: End

Personal information
- Born: September 6, 1889; Rockford, Illinois, U.S.
- Died: January 9, 1979 (aged 89); Robinson, Illinois, U.S.

Career information
- College: Illinois (1913–1915)

Awards and highlights
- Consensus All-American (1914); First-team All-Western (1914)

Perry Henry Graves Sr. (September 6, 1889 – January 9, 1979), was an All-American football player who played end for the University of Illinois from 1913 to 1915. In later life, he owned lumber companies.

== Biography ==
A native of Rockford, Illinois, Graves graduated from Rockford High School before enrolling at the University of Illinois. He played at the end position on Robert Zuppke's 1914 football team that won the Western Conference championship and tied Army for the national championship. Graves was a speedy, 148-pound end while starting for the Illini football team in 1914. In 1914, Graves and teammates Harold Pogue and Ralph Chapman became the first University of Illinois football players to be selected as first-team All-Americans. Graves was selected as a first-team All-American by Frank G. Menke, sporting editor of the International News Service.

After graduating from the University of Illinois, he worked as a lumber salesman for nine years. He moved to Robinson, Illinois, in 1925 and became a partner in the Otey Lumber Company. Graves later acquired the interest of his partner, and the business was renamed the Robinson Lumber Company. Graves acquired the Palestine Lumber Co. and the Oblong Lumber Co. and established the Hutsonville Lumber Co. He also officiated Big Ten football games for 22 years. He served as President of the Robinson Chamber of Commerce and was a member of several fraternal organizations, including the Moose, Elks and Masons.

White was married to Marvel White. Their son, Perry Graves Jr., received Silver Stars for his service in both World War II and the Korean War. Their other three sons, Dean, Parker and Howard also served in World War II. Sons Parker and Perry Jr. followed in their fathers footsteps and worked in the lumber business. Their sons Hank and John Graves managed the lumber company until John sold the business and retired in Henderson, North Carolina. Son Howard used the GI bill to go to college and finally joined the news-gathering service, Associated Press. He retired as a bureau chief in Honolulu, Hawaii, after stints in Little Rock, Arkansas; Portland, Oregon; Albuquerque, New Mexico and then again in Portland, Oregon. Through his career he was the national president of the Society of Professional Journalist, Sigma Delta Chi, a journalistic ethics association. He is married to Audrey Graves with two sons, Carson and Graham Graves. He also has a granddaughter, Kate Graves who lives in Edmonds, Washington.

Perry Graves retired from the lumber business in 1955 and continued to live in Robinson, Illinois. Graves died in January 1979 at age 89. At the time of his death, he was the second oldest living All-American (Hamilton Fish III was the oldest.)
