= Ed O'Hearn =

American football player (1898–1972)

Profile
- Position: Tackle

Personal information
- Born: December 1, 1898; Brookline, Massachusetts
- Died: April 25, 1972 (aged 73)
- Listed height: 5 ft 9 in (1.75 m)
- Listed weight: 195 lb (88 kg)

Career information
- College: Boston College, Lehigh

Career history
- Cleveland Tigers (1920); New York Brickley Giants (1921)

Edmund Francis O'Hearn (December 1, 1898 — April 25, 1972) was a professional football player. He played in the National Football League (NFL) in 1920 with the Cleveland Tigers and in 1921 with the New York Brickley Giants. Prior to joining the NFL, O'Hearn played college football at Boston College His older brother, John O'Hearn, played for the NFL's Buffalo All-Americans in 1921. Both brothers played for the Tigers in 1920.
