= Harold Ballin =

American football player and coach (1893–1979)

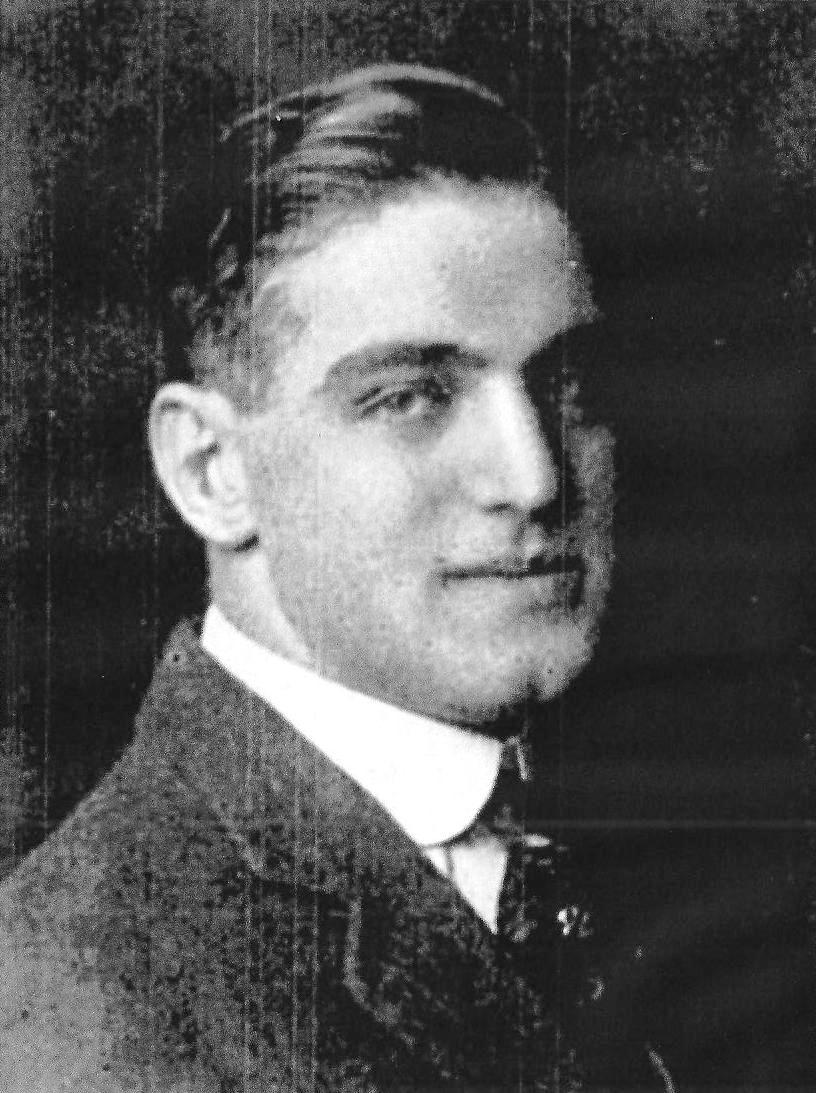

Biographical details
- Born: October 16, 1893; New York, New York, U.S.
- Died: December 25, 1979 (aged 86); Clearwater, Florida, U.S.

Playing career
- 1912–1914: Princeton
- Position: Tackle

Coaching career (HC unless noted)
- 1915: Lafayette (assistant)
- 1916: Princeton (assistant)
- 1919: Princeton (assistant)
- 1921: Shady Side Academy (PA)
- 1922–1923: Duquesne

Head coaching record
- Overall: 4–12 (college)

Accomplishments and honors

Awards
- 2× consensus All-American (1913, 1914)
- College Football Hall of Fame; Inducted in 1973 (profile)

Harold Roy Ballin (October 16, 1893 – December 25, 1979) was an American football player and coach. He played at the tackle position for Princeton University from 1912 to 1914 and was a consensus first-team All-American in both 1913 and 1914. Ballin served as the head football coach at Duquesne University from 1922 to 1923, compiling a record of 4–12. He was inducted into the College Football Hall of Fame as a player in 1973.

== Biography ==
=== Early years ===
A native of New York City, Ballin attended the Lawrenceville School before enrolling at Princeton University. He made the Second Testimonial honor roll at Lawrenceville in April 1909.

=== Princeton ===
Ballin later recalled that he was "young and underdeveloped" when he enrolled at Princeton. He had been unable to make the varsity football team at Lawrenceville and qualified for the fourth and final unit of Princeton's freshman football team in 1911.

In 1912, Ballin played as a substitute tackle on Princeton's varsity football team. It was as a junior in 1913 that Ballin became a star. Playing at the right tackle position, Ballin was selected as a consensus first-team All-American in 1913. He was selected as a first-team All-American by, among others, Walter Camp in Collier's Weekly, University of Michigan Coach Fielding H. Yost, football historian Parke H. Davis, sports writer Tom Thorp, and the Trenton Evening-Times. In announcing his All-American team, Tom Thorp described Ballin's contributions as follows:

Ballin of Princeton as a playing mate would leave the defensive strength of the eleven unquestionable. Ballin is a Hercules in size, who has a wonderfully quick charge and carries his efforts through at all times. The remarkable defense shown by the Tigers under the shadow of their own goal posts was due to a great extent to the almost superhuman efforts of Ballin. In speed and aggressiveness, he would prove a leader of any organization in the country today. Time and time again when his end would be spilled by the opposing backs going down under kicks, he broke through and sped down the field and made the tackle almost as soon as the ball had been caught. In opening holes for his backs he was without an equal.

College Football Hall of Famer Charles Brickley later recalled that Ballin was the hardest-hitting player he ever faced. Brickley said of Ballin:

And the hardest-hitting player I went up against was Ballin ... In that game against Princeton [in 1913], which was played in a sea of mud, official statistics verified by a correct counting of my bruises show that I was knocked down seventy-eight times. Thirty-eight times it was Ballin who was the catapult force that took me off my pins. Ballin weighed 220 pounds. I tipped the scales at 180. When the game was over I had gone down to 168.

At the meeting of the Princeton football on December 4, 1913, Ballin was elected as the captain of the 1914 football team. At age 20, he was one of the youngest players ever chosen as captain of Princeton's football team. As captain of the 1914 team, Ballin played every minute of every game for Princeton. In recognition of his contributions in 1914, Ballin was selected as a first-team All-American by 21 of 26 recognized selectors, including Walter Camp, Vanity Fair (selected based on the votes of 175 "prominent newspapermen of the country"), Walter Eckersall of the Chicago Tribune, Frank G. Menke, sporting editor of the International News Service, the New York Herald, and James P. Sinnot of the New York Evening Mail.

Ballin is also remembered as the last Princeton football player to play the game without a helmet. Ballin reportedly considered the helmet to be a distraction. According to newspaper accounts of the time, Ballin was "known to the sport-following public of the United States as Nig Ballin."

=== Football coach ===
After graduating from Princeton, Ballin became a football coach at Lafayette College. In May 1916, he returned to Princeton as an assistant football coach.

Following the entry of the United States into World War I, Ballin enlisted in the United States Marine Corps; he was commissioned as a second lieutenant in July 1917. In the fall of 1917, Ballin was assigned to Fort Crockett on Galveston Island, where he played on the Fort Crockett football team. In December 1918, Lieutenant Ballin coached a football team made up of Marines from the Eight Regiment of the Third Provisional Brigade, United States Marine Corps.

In the fall of 1919, after completing his military service, Ballin returned to his position as an assistant football coach at Princeton.

In 1921, Ballin was hired as "director of football tactics" at Shady Side Academy and led the team to a one-loss season. In 1922, Ballin became the head football coach at Duquesne University in Pittsburgh, Pennsylvania. Ballin continued as head coach for the Duquesne Dukes for the 1922 and 1923 college football seasons.

=== Later years and death ===
After retiring from coaching, Ballin worked as a field engineer in Pittsburgh. In May 1973, Ballin was elected to the College Football Hall of Fame in the Pioneer Player category. He was also selected on Princeton's All-Century Team in December 1999.

Ballin died on Christmas Day 1979 in Clearwater, Florida, at age 86.

== Head coaching record ==
=== College ===
Year	Team	Overall	Conference	Standing	Bowl/playoffs
Duquesne Dukes (Independent) (1922–1923)
1922	Duquesne	0–8			
1923	Duquesne	4–4			
Duquesne:		4–12			
Total:		4–12			
