= Dan Kenan =

American football player and coach (1891–1952)

Biographical details
- Born: September 30, 1891; Seymour, Texas, U.S.
- Died: September 12, 1952 (aged 60); Okmulgee, Oklahoma, U.S.

Playing career

Football
- 1913–1914: Wesleyan

Coaching career (HC unless noted)

Football
- 1915: Wesleyan (assistant)
- 1916: Wesleyan
- 1920: Wesleyan

Basketball
- 1916–1917: Wesleyan (assistant)

Head coaching record
- Overall: 9–2–3 (football); 6–8 (basketball)

Dan Cummins Kenan (September 30, 1891 – September 12, 1952) was an American football player and coach. He played football for Wesleyan University in 1913 and 1914 and served as the head coach of the Wesleyan football team in 1916 and 1920. His .750 winning percentage as Wesleyan's head football coach ranks third in the 127-year history of Wesleyan football.

== Athlete ==
Dan Cummins Kenan was born in Seymour, Texas, on September 30, 1891. He grew up in El Paso, Texas, and attended the El Paso Military Academy. He subsequently enrolled at Wesleyan University in Middletown, Connecticut, where he played for the Wesleyan Cardinals football team in 1913 and 1914. He was a utility player during most of the 1913 season and played at both the halfback and tackle positions in Wesleyan's 1913 game against Trinity College. Kenan cracked a rib in a game against Amherst during the 1913 season. Kenan was unanimously selected as the captain of Wesleyan's 1914 football team and played fullback for the 1914 team. He also did punting and drop kicking for the 1914 Wesleyan team. At the end of the 1914 college football season, Outing magazine selected Kenan for its Football Roll of Honor as one of the "Stars of the Gridiron in 1914."

== Coach ==
In June 1915, Kenan was voted the best athlete in Wesleyan's senior class. That same month, he was also hired as an assistant to help Dick Eustis coach the football team. In February 1916, Kenan became the head football coach at Wesleyan and led the team to 4–1–2 record. He was also hired as Wesleyan's head men's basketball coach in December 1916. With the entry of the United States into World War I, Kenan entered the military and was assigned to an officer's training camp in 1917. He was commissioned as a field artillery officer, and achieved the rank of Captain. After leaving the military, Kenan returned to his position as Wesleyan's head football coach in 1920. He led the 1920 football team to a 5–1–1 record and a tie for the Little Three football championship. In two seasons as Wesleyan's head football coach, Kenan compiled a 9–2–3 record. His .750 winning percentage ranks third all-time in the 127-year history of Wesleyan football.

== Later life and career ==
Kenan married Maude Mitchell Harrison on June 12, 1923. He served two terms as mayor of Okmulgee, Oklahoma, and one term in the Oklahoma House of Representatives. During World War II, he was the area director of the War Manpower Commission in Tulsa. Before and after the war, he worked in oil promotions, merchandising, radio station management, and real estate. He died September 12, 1952, in Okmulgee.

== See also ==
- 1914 All-America college football team
