= Burleigh Cruikshank =

American football player and minister (1890–1982)

Profile
- Position: Center

Personal information
- Born: June 4, 1890; Boston, Massachusetts, U.S.
- Died: October 1982 (age 92); Philadelphia, Pennsylvania, U.S.

Career information
- College: Washington & Jefferson

Career history
- 1913–1914: Washington & Jefferson

Awards and highlights
- Third-team All-American (1914)

Burleigh Cruikshank (June 4, 1890 – October 1982) was an American football player and Presbyterian minister. In 1914, he was a first-team All-American playing at the center position for Washington & Jefferson College. He later attended the Princeton Theological Seminary and served as a Presbyterian minister in Pittsburgh, Pennsylvania, Steubenville, Ohio and Philadelphia, Pennsylvania.

== Biography ==
=== Early life ===
Cruikshank was born in Boston, Massachusetts in 1890 and attended the Blair Academy, a private boarding school in rural Warren County, New Jersey.

=== Washington & Jefferson College ===
Cruikshank enrolled at Washington & Jefferson College located near Pittsburgh. He excelled as an athlete on the school's football and baseball teams. Cruikshank played at the center position for the Washington & Jefferson football team in 1913 and 1914.

During the time that Cruikshank attended Washington & Jefferson, the football team was among the elite programs in the United States. In 1913, the team posted a 10-0-1 record and were the highest scoring team in the nation. The 1913 team played Yale to a scoreless tie, defeated Grove City College by a score of 100–0, and broke the Penn State Nittany Lions' 19-game winning streak with a 17–0 victory. Sportswriter Walter S. Trumbull of The New York Sun suggested that the Michigan Aggies, Washington & Jefferson, Chicago University, and Notre Dame were the new "Big 4 of College Football" instead of the traditional grouping of Princeton, Yale, Harvard, and Penn.

Following the 1913 season, Cruishank was selected to be the captain of the 1914 football team. The 1914 team lost at Harvard in front of 15,000 fans by a score of 10–9. If not for an errant kick that hit the crossbar, W&J would have won the Harvard game and at least a share of the mythical national championship. The 1914 team went on to defeat Yale by a score of 13–7, becoming only the 7th team to ever defeat Yale's football team. The game received national press coverage, and the team received a personal note of congratulations from Theodore Roosevelt.

At the end of the 1914 season, Cruikshank was selected as a first-team All-American by the New York Herald, the Newark Sunday Call, the Philadelphia Evening Bulletin, the Washington Herald, the Philadelphia Evening Telegraph, and Philadelphia's Public Ledger. During his time at Washington & Jefferson, Curikshank also excelled as a student. At the time of his graduation from the college in 1915, a newspaper story noted that he was among the top students in his class:

"Captain Burleigh Cruikshank, of W. & J.'s great football team of 1914 and who has been called the greatest center in years, has managed in spite of his athletic activity to complete the four-year course in three years and finished among the honor men of his class. He also won varsity insignia in baseball. He lives at West Somerville, Mass."

=== Theology student and football coach ===
After graduating from Washington & Jefferson, Cruikshank enrolled at the Princeton Theological Seminary. While attending Princeton he also worked as an assistant football coach at Princeton University. In December 1915, he was rumored to be the successor to Bob Folwell as the head football coach at Washington & Jefferson. A newspaper account at the time noted:

"Cruikshank, as a coach, ought to be a real success. He knows football and, best of all, he knows how to handle men. He was one of the most popular students that ever attended W. & J. and his great work on the gridiron won him the honor of All-American center on many of the mythical elevens of 1914. Cruikshank, who is taking a theological course at Princeton now, was assistant to Folwell during the 1915 football season, and he showed wonderful ability as a football tutor."

=== Presbyterian minister ===
After graduating from the Princeton Seminary, Cruikshank began his ministry as the pastor of a small church in Chatham, New Jersey. In 1920, he was hired as the assistant pastor at the First Presbyterian Church in Pittsburgh, one of the largest churches in that city. Cruikshank was given charge of promoting athletic activities for the young men and boys of the congregation.

In 1921, Cruikshank was hired as the pastor of the Westminster Presbyterian Church in Steubenville, Ohio, approximately 40 miles west of Pittsburgh. He remained in Steubenville through at least 1926. While working as a minister, Cruikshank continued his interest in football and used it as a theme in his speeches and sermons. At a 1923 banquet honoring Steubenville's undefeated 1922 football team, Cruikshank spoke of the importance athletics:

"I am for athletics in the school. They create a school consciousness, call it spirit if you will. When you leave school after playing on its football team you have something that will always hold your school career near and dear to you. ... Athletics embue the fellow who plays and the fans as well in a spirit that never says die. ... That's the thing that counts in life, the never give up spirit. To my mind if we can take this spirit out of high school with us it means more to us than our Latin or Greek. In my work especially I find that every walk of life needs the fellow who can take the kick and still come up with a smile but a determination."

Cruikshank returned to Washington & Jefferson in 1928 as the commencement speaker. Cruikshank was also awarded an honorary doctorate from Washington & Jefferson College in 1926.

From at least 1928 to 1946, Cruikshank served as the pastor at St. Paul's Presbyterian Church in Philadelphia, the largest Presbyterian church in Philadelphia and one of the largest in the United States. In the late 1940s, he was the minister at the First Presbyterian Church in the Chestnut Hill neighborhood in Northwest Philadelphia.

=== Later years and death ===
Cruikshank died in 1982 at age 92 while living in Philadelphia.

== See also ==
- 1914 College Football All-America Team
