= Albert Journeay =

American football player (1890–1972)

Profile
- Positions: Center, guard

Personal information
- Born: November 25, 1890; Piermont, New York, U.S.
- Died: May 4, 1972 (aged 81); Valrico, Florida, U.S.

Career information
- College: Penn

Albert Journeay (November 25, 1890 May 4, 1972) was an American college football player. He played at the guard and center positions for the Penn Quakers football teams from 1912 to 1914 and was selected as both team captain and a first-team All-American in 1914.

== Early life ==
Journeay was born in Piermont, New York, in 1890, and grew up in Leonia, New Jersey. He attended the Mt. Hermon School.

== Penn ==
Journeay enrolled at the University of Pennsylvania (Penn) in 1911. He played for the freshman football team in 1911 and for the varsity, at the guard and center positions, from 1912 to 1914. At the end of the 1913 season, he was elected by his teammates as the captain of the 1914 Penn Quakers football team. The 1914 team compiled a disappointing 4–4–1 record, but Journeay won praise for his leadership and defensive play, one newspaper writing that he stood out as "one of the greatest individuals of the year." Another newspaper wrote: "He was the mainstay of the secondary defense all year and his playing was conspicuous all through the games." At the end of the 1914 season, he was selected as a first-team All-American by James P. Sinnot of the New York Evening Mail, the Washington Herald, Newark Evening Star, and Philadelphia Inquirer. Journeay graduated from Penn in 1915 with a bachelor's degree in economics.

== Later life ==
After graduating from Penn, Journeay had a career in banking in Chattanooga, Tennessee. He also worked as a vice president at the Chattanooga Purse Co. In 1957, Journeay moved from Chicago to Venice, Florida. He died at age 81 in 1972.
