= 1914 All-Western college football team =

American all-star college football team

The 1914 All-Western college football team consists of American football players selected to the All-Western teams chosen by various selectors for the 1914 college football season.

== All-Western selections ==
=== Ends ===
- Perry Graves, Illinois (CC, CON, DJ, FM-1, GH, HP, LGS, SC)
- Boyd Cherry, Ohio State (CC, CON, DJ, FC, FM-1, GH, WE-2, WW)
- Blake Miller, Michigan Agricultural (FC, HP, LA, WE-1)
- George K. Squier, Illinois (FM-2, WW)
- Bert Baston, Minnesota (SC) (CFHOF)
- Mal Elward, Notre Dame (WE-2)
- Arthur H. Gunderson, Iowa (FM-2)

=== Tackles ===
- Vic Halligan, Nebraska (CC, CON, DJ, FM-1, GH, HP, LA, LGS, SC, WE-1, WW)
- Cub Buck, Wisconsin (CC, CON, LA [guard], LGS, SC, WE-1)
- William D. Cochran, Michigan (FC, HP, WE-2)
- Laurens Shull, Chicago (FC, FM-2, LA)
- Ray Keeler, Wisconsin (FM-1, LA [guard])
- Butler (?), Wisconsin (DJ)
- Jim Copley, Missouri Mines (WW)
- Walter Essman, Christian Brothers (GH)
- Lennox F. Armstrong, Illinois (FM-2, WE-2)

=== Guards ===
- Ralph Chapman, Illinois (CC, CON, DJ, FC, FM-1, GH, HP, LGS, SC, WE-1)
- H. B. Routh, Purdue (CC, CON, FM-2, GH, SC, WE-1, WW)
- Arlie Mucks, Wisconsin (DJ, FC, FM-1, HP, WE-2)
- Charlie Bachman, Notre Dame (LGS) (CFHOF)
- Boles Rosenthal, Minnesota (FM-2 [center], WE-2)
- Emmett Keefe, Notre Dame (FM-2)

=== Centers ===
- Paul Des Jardien, Chicago (CC, CON, DJ, FC, FM-1, GH, LA, LGS, SC, WE-1, WW [guard]) (CFHOF)
- James Raynsford, Michigan (HP, WE-2)
- John W. Watson, Illinois (WW)

=== Quarterbacks ===
- George Clark, Illinois (CC, CON, DJ, FC, FM-1, GH, HP, LA, SC, WE-2, WW)
- Dutch Bergman, Notre Dame (WE-1)
- Pete Russell, Chicago (LGS)
- Tommy Hughitt, Michigan (FM-2)

=== Halfbacks ===
- John Maulbetsch, Michigan (CC, CON, DJ, FC, FM-1, GH, HP, LA, LGS [fullback], SC, WE-1, WW) (CFHOF)
- Harold Pogue, Illinois (CC, CON, DJ, FC, FM-1, GH, HP [fullback], LA, LGS, SC, WE-1, WW)
- Gray, Chicago (FM-2, LGS)
- Dick Rutherford, Nebraska (WE-2)
- Wilbur Hightower, Northwestern (WE-2)
- Guy Chamberlin, Nebraska (FM-2)

=== Fullbacks ===
- Lorin Solon, Minnesota (CC, CON, DJ, FM-1, GH, LA [end], LGS [end], SC, WE-1 [end], WW)
- George E. Julian, Michigan Agricultural (FC, HP [halfback], LA, WE-1)
- Ray Eichenlaub, Notre Dame (WE-2)
- Eugene Schobinger, Illinois (FM-2)

== Key ==
Bold = consensus choice by a majority of the selectors

CC = Selections of Western coaches and critics

CON = Consensus of opinion of coaches and critics compiled by E.B. Moss of the Associated Press, New York City

DJ = Dick Jemison, sporting editor Atlanta Constitution

FC = F. M. Church, sporting editor, The Michigan Daily

FM = Frank G. Menke, sporting editor of the International News Service

GH = George Henger in St. Louis Times

HP = Howard Pearson, sporting editor Detroit Journal

LA = Leonard Adams in Chicago Daily Journal

LGS = Lambert G. Sullivan in Chicago Daily News

SC = Sidney Casner, sporting editor Illinois Magazine and Daily Illini

WE = Walter Eckersall

WW = Wilbur Wood in St. Louis Republic

CFHOF = College Football Hall of Fame

== See also ==
- 1914 College Football All-America Team
