= Benjamin Dibblee =

American football player and coach (1876–1945)

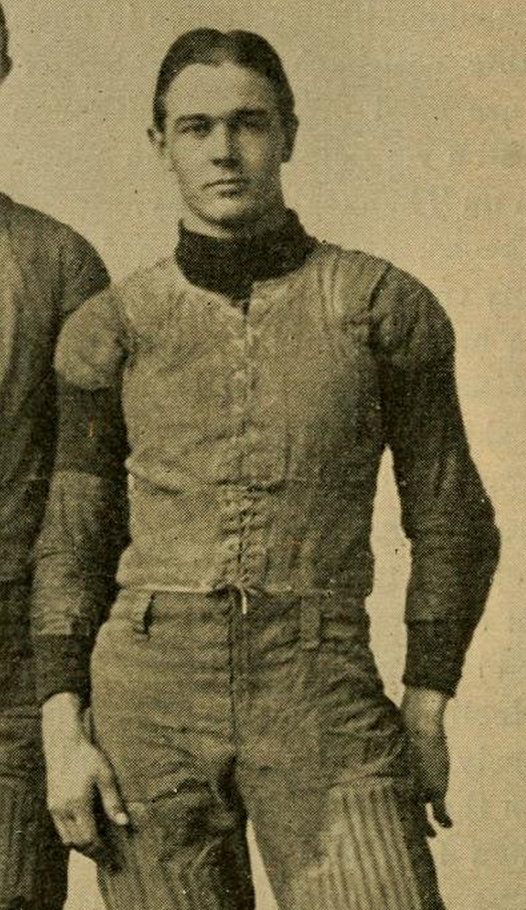
- Dibblee pictured in The Official National Collegiate Athletic Association football guide, 1899

Biographical details
- Born: July 8, 1876; Ross, California, U.S.
- Died: November 11, 1945 (aged 69) near Fairfield, California, U.S.

Playing career
- 1896–1898: Harvard
- Position: Halfback

Coaching career (HC unless noted)
- 1899–1900: Harvard

Head coaching record
- Overall: 20–1–1

Accomplishments and honors

Championships
- 1 national (1899)

Awards
- 2× consensus All-American (1897, 1898)

Benjamin Harrison Dibblee (July 8, 1876 – November 11, 1945) was an American college football player and coach. He played halfback for Harvard University from 1896 to 1898, and was a consensus All-American in 1897 and 1898. Dibblee served as the head football coach for Harvard from 1899 to 1900, compiling a 20–1–1. His 1899 team was retroactively recognized as a national champion by a number of selectors.

Dibblee attended preparatory school at the Groton School where he played on the football team and took a prominent role in athletics. Dibblee was small for a football player, even by the standards of the 1890s, standing 5 feet, 8-8½ inches, and weighing only 156 pounds. He enrolled at Harvard in 1895 and played on the freshman football team that year. In 1896, he played on the varsity team where he played in one or two games at fullback. He was a starter for Harvard throughout his junior season in 1897. As a senior in 1898, Dibblee was selected as captain of Harvard's football team and as a first-team All-American by Walter Camp, Caspar Whitney for Harper's Weekly, the Syracuse Herald, The Sun, and the New York Evening Telegram. In late November 1897, Dibblee was elected by his teammates as the captain of the 1898 Harvard football team.

In March 1899, Dibblee was appointed as head coach of the Harvard football team. As of 1913, Dibblee was the Pacific coast manager for a firm of brokers. Dibblee died on November 11, 1945, at the Joy Island Duck club near Fairfield, California.

== Head coaching record ==
| Year | Team | Overall | Conference | Standing | Bowl/playoffs |
|---|---|---|---|---|---|
Harvard Crimson (Independent) (1899–1900)
| 1899 | Harvard | 10–0–1 | | | |
| 1900 | Harvard | 10–1 | | | |
| Harvard: | | 20–1–1 | | | |
| Total: | | 20–1–1 | | | |
National championship Conference title Conference division title or championship game berth
