= Stan Pennock =

American football player (1892–1916)

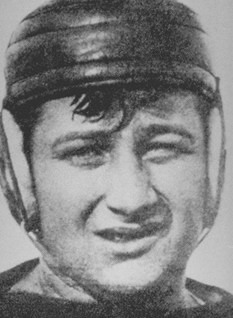

Profile
- Position: Guard

Personal information
- Born: June 15, 1892; Syracuse, New York, U.S.
- Died: November 27, 1916 (aged 24); Newark, New Jersey, U.S.
- Listed height: 5 ft 8 in (1.73 m)
- Listed weight: 193 lb (88 kg)

Career information
- College: Harvard (1912–1914)

Awards and highlights
- 2× National Champion (1912, 1913); 3× Consensus All-American (1912–1914)
- College Football Hall of Fame (Class of 1954)

Stanley Bagg "Bags" Pennock (June 15, 1892 – November 27, 1916) was an American football player. He was selected as a first-team All-American at the guard position three consecutive years while leading Harvard University to three undefeated seasons from 1912 to 1914. He was killed in 1916 in an explosion at a chemical plant in New Jersey. He was posthumously elected to the College Football Hall of Fame in 1954.

== Early life ==
A native of Syracuse, New York, Pennock was the son of John D. Pennock, the general manager of the Solvay Process Company. He attended the Hackley School at Tarrytown, New York, before enrolling at Harvard University.

== Harvard University ==
Pennock entered Harvard in 1911 and played on the school's freshman football and track teams. He gained fame as a member of Percy Haughton's undefeated football teams of 1912, 1913, and 1914.

Pennock helped to provide Harvard with one of the most aggressive defenses in Eastern football. During Hardwick's three years as a starter for Harvard, Pennock developed a reputation as "one of the best linemen that ever played under the old or the new rules." Harvard's football team did not lose a single game while Pennock played in its line, compiling records of 9–0 in 1912, 9–0 in 1913, and 7–0–2 in 1914. Harvard was the national football champion in each of Pennock's three seasons, out-scoring the competition, 588–61. In helping Harvard win three straight national championships, Pennock was also selected as a first-team All-American in all three years by Walter Camp. As a senior in 1914, Pennock was selected as a first-team All-American by 25 of 26 selectors, including Collier's Weekly (selected by Walter Camp), Vanity Fair (selected based on the votes of 175 newspapermen), Walter Eckersall of the Chicago Tribune, and the New York Herald.

While attending Harvard, Pennock was also a member of the Delta Kappa Epsilon fraternity, the Institute of 1779, and the Hasty Pudding Club.

== Career in chemistry ==
After graduating from Harvard, Pennock became a chemist. In the fall of 1915, he attended post-graduate courses at Harvard's chemical laboratories. He entered into a business partnership with two other Harvard graduates, James Bryant Conant and Chauncey Loomis, and formed the LPC Laboratories. Pennock and his partners opened a plant in a one-story building in the Queens section of New York, at which they manufactured chemicals that were selling at high prices due to interruption of imports from Germany during World War I. The New York plant was destroyed by a fire, and the partners immediately opened a new plant in an abandoned slaughterhouse in Newark, New Jersey.

== Death and tributes ==
Two weeks after the Newark plant opened, Pennock and two others were killed in an explosion believed to have been caused by gasoline stored at the plant. His teammate Walter Trumbull spoke at the funeral and reflected on Pennock's life:

Stan was a true man. He lacked nothing in virtues and he was everything a man should be. When in college we looked to 'Stan' as one to whom we might tell our troubles. We confided everything to him and he was ever able to make us see life in a different light. And Stan was possessed of great abilities. The most striking feature of it all was, that he was unconscious of what he really was. His Christian qualities will always remain in our minds and we will think of him forever as the great friend he was.

Following Pennock's death, the Boston Globe published a tribute which included the following observations:

"Stan" Pennock always will be remembered not only as one of Harvard's greatest guards, but as one of the highest types of young manhood that ever has been connected with Harvard football. His name will be remembered with those of the late Marshall Newell and Francis Burr ... Although active in athletics at Harvard and in college days, Stanley Pennock was always a high stand man of his classes.

In 1917, Pennock's father endowed the Stanley Bagg Pennock Scholarship at Harvard, to be awarded to an indigent senior student specializing in chemistry and intending to pursue a career as a chemist.

Pennock was posthumously elected to the College Football Hall of Fame as part of its second induction class in 1954.
