= John Toohey (American football) =

American college football player (c. 1891–1916)

Biographical details
- Born: c. 1891; Kingston, New York, U.S.
- Died: April 29, 1916 (aged 24); Oneonta, New York, U.S.

Playing career

Football
- 1910–1914: Rutgers

Basketball
- 1914–1915: Rutgers
- Position: Tackle (football)

Coaching career (HC unless noted)

Football
- 1915: Rutgers (assistant)

Accomplishments and honors

Awards
- First-team All-American (1914)

John Peter "Hush" Toohey (c. 1891 – April 29, 1916) was an American college football and college basketball player. A native of Kingston, New York, Toohey was "known as one of the best athletes Newburgh H. S. ever turned out." He enrolled at Rutgers University in 1910 and was a star athlete in both basketball and football. He played at the tackle position for the Rutgers football team from 1910 to 1914. In September 1912, The New York Times called Toohey "Rutgers' greatest tackle," and noted that Toohey's brother also planned to play at tackle for Rutgers. Toohey worked during the summer of 1913 building the Croton Aqueduct, and there was uncertainty as to whether he would return for another season of football. When he announced his intent to return to the gridiron, the New Brunswick Times reported: "Toohey Is Back Ready To Jump In The Game." In November 1913, Toohey was elected by his teammates as captain of the 1914 Rutgers Queensmen football team. In December 1913, the Board of Managers at Rutgers ruled that Toohey was ineligible to play in 1914, having already played four seasons with the football team. The decision of the Board of Managers sparked a controversy, as alumni sought to restore his eligibility, and others criticized any leniency in enforcing the four-year eligibility rule. Toohey's eligibility was ultimately restored, and he was the captain of the 1914 Rutgers team. Following a 33–0 win over NYU in November 1914, The New York Times praised Toohey for his blocking: "Toohey weights 210 pounds and made a whole in the line ten yards wide." He was also selected as a first-team All-American in 1914 by James P. Sinnot of the New York Evening Mail, the New York Globe, sports writer Daniel of the New York Press the Newark Sunday Call, and Newark Evening Star. In announcing the selection of Toohey, Daniel wrote:

"Among the tackles we place Toohey of Rutgers on an even plane with Ballin of Princeton. Despite his 210 pounds Toohey is a speedy and is a stone wall on defense. He played Ballin in the Princeton game, and had distinctly the better of the Tiger captain."

In 1915, Toohey's eligibility to play for the Rutgers football team was finally revoked under "the four-year residence rule," but he assisted in training the team's linemen during the 1915 football season. In 1916, Tohey was employed as a civil engineer by the Delaware and Hudson Railway. He was killed at the age of 24, on April 29, 1916, by a locomotive in Oneonta, New York.

Toohey was inducted into the Rutgers Athletics Hall of Fame in 1995.
