= Boyd Cherry =

American football and basketball player (1893–1970)

Ohio State Buckeyes
- Position: End

Personal information
- Born: March 6, 1893; Newark, Ohio, U.S.
- Died: November 14, 1970 (age 77); Fort Myers, Florida, U.S.

Career information
- College: Ohio State (1914)

Awards and highlights
- Second-team All-American (1914); First-team All-Western (1914)

Boyd Vincent Cherry (March 6, 1893 – November 14, 1970) was an American football and basketball player. He played college football and basketball at Ohio State University. In 1914 he became the first Ohio State Buckeyes football player to receive All-American honors and the first to receive first-team all-conference honors. After graduating from Ohio State in 1915, he was employed for more than 25 years by the Kinnear Manufacturing Company in Columbus, Ohio. He was born in Newark, Ohio, in 1893, and he died in 1970 at age 77 in Fort Myers, Florida.
