= Huntington Hardwick =

American football player (1892–1949)

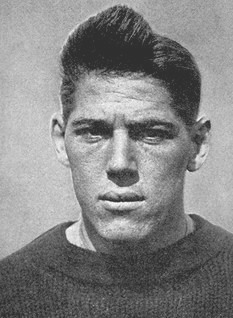
- circa 1914

Profile
- Positions: Halfback, End

Personal information
- Born: October 15, 1892; Quincy, Massachusetts, U.S.
- Died: June 26, 1949 (aged 56); Cuttyhunk, Massachusetts, U.S.
- Listed height: 6 ft 0 in (1.83 m)
- Listed weight: 171 lb (78 kg)

Career information
- High school: Groton (Groton, Massachusetts)
- College: Harvard (1912–1914)

Awards and highlights
- 2× National Champion (1912, 1913); Unanimous All-American (1914); Second-team All-American (1913); FWAA College Football All-Time team (1869-1919)
- College Football Hall of Fame (Class of 1954)

Other information
- Uniformed service
- Allegiance: United States
- Branch: United States Army
- Service years: 1917–1918
- Conflicts: World War I

Huntington Reed "Tack" Hardwick (October 15, 1892 – June 26, 1949) was an American football player. He played at the halfback and end positions for the Harvard Crimson. He never lost a game during his three years on the varsity, and was selected as a unanimous first-team All-American in 1914. He was elected to the College Football Hall of Fame in 1954. Later in life he co-founded the Boston Garden.

== Biography ==
=== Early life ===
A native of Quincy, Massachusetts, Hardwick was the son of Charles Theodore Hardwick and Leslie Baldwin Hardwick. His family immigrated to the United States from Germany in 1752 and had operated a granite quarry in Quincy since 1868.

=== Harvard University ===
Hardwick attended Harvard from 1911 to 1915. He lettered in football, baseball, and track and field. He captained Harvard's baseball team and played center field. He was also a shot putter for the track team and was rated Harvard's strongest man two consecutive seasons.

Hardwick gained his greatest fame, however, playing for Percy Haughton's Harvard football teams from 1912 to 1914. During Hardwick's three years as a starter for Harvard, the football team did not lose a single game, going 9–0 in 1912, 9–0 in 1913, and 7–0–2 in 1914. He was known as a fierce blocker. In naming Hardwick to Harvard's all-time team, one reporter later wrote: "Hardwick, known to his intimates as 'Tack,' was perhaps the hardest blocker American football has ever known. A vicious, tireless interferer, Hardwick was never happy as long as a single enemy remained standing."

As a sophomore in 1912, Hardwick had a 60-yard touchdown run against Amherst College, scored a touchdown in Harvard's first victory over Princeton in 25 years, and caused a fumble that led to a game-winning touchdown against Yale.

As a junior in 1913, Hardwick was moved to the end position to allow Eddie Mahan to play at halfback. Despite having to learn a new position, Hardwick was selected by Walter Camp as a second-team All-American end in 1913.

As a senior in 1914, Hardwick split his playing time between the end and halfback positions. At the end of the 1914 season, Hardwick was the only player who was unanimously selected as a first-team All-American by all 26 selectors, including Collier's Weekly (selected by Walter Camp), Vanity Fair (selected based on the votes of 175 newspapermen), Walter Eckersall of the Chicago Tribune, and Frank G. Menke, the sporting editor of the International News Service.

=== World War I ===
During his senior year, several colleges and high schools offered Hardwick coaching jobs. He briefly worked as an assistant coach at the United States Naval Academy, under Jonas Ingram. He left coaching and became a clerk at his father-in-law Galen Stone's financial firm Hayden, Stone & Co.

Hardwick's business career was interrupted by World War I. He joined the U.S. Army in May 1917, one month after America entered the war. He served in the 105th Trench Mortar Battery in France (part of the 30th Infantry Division), participating at Messines Ridge, Verdun, St. Mihiel, the Argonne, and Woevre. He attained the rank of captain.

=== World War I Correspondence ===
During World War I, Huntington Hardwick wrote letters home describing his experiences on the battlefield. In one letter, he detailed a recent operation:

"We have just finished an operation in Trench Artillery. Our mission was to make three breaches in barbed wire and destroy a system of trenches in which were many machine guns."

He described the brutal reality of war, including the death of a German lieutenant, and noted:

"This description seems very rosy, but as an honest matter of fact it is a case where the truth needs no embellishing."

In another letter, Hardwick recounted his time near Ypres and Messines Ridge:

"I returned last night from the English front in Belgium near Ypres, Messine Ridge, etc. I have had the most exciting time of my life and I shall tell you as much as is permitted."

These letters provide a gripping first-hand perspective on the war and are preserved in the Ravi D. Goel Collection at the Harvard University Archives.

=== Business career ===
Following the war, Hardwick went on to have a successful career in business in Boston. He returned to Hayden Stone, but left finance for the Boston advertising firm Doremus & Co. He also served as a director of the Columbian Steamship Company, the Santander Navigation Company, and the Boston Garden-Arena Corporation. He served as a volunteer policeman during the 1919 Boston police strike and was injured during the Scollay Square riot.

Hardwick was an early supporter of professional sports. In 1926, the National Hockey League awarded its Chicago franchise (now known as the Chicago Blackhawks) to a syndicate of investors led by Hardwick, but after the existing franchise owners quarreled over Hardwick's business ties to Tex Rickard, Hardwick resold the franchise to Chicago businessman Frederic McLaughlin, explaining that the team would henceforth be run by "Chicago men." Two years later, he and Rickard co-founded the Boston Garden, which opened in 1928. In 1939, he became vice president of Tris Speaker's brand-new National Professional Indoor Baseball League, but it collapsed within a year.

=== Family ===
In 1915, Hardwick married Margaret Stone; the couple had been engaged since 1913. Margaret was reportedly an "enthusiastic follower" of Harvard football. Their wedding, attended by 1,000 guests, was described as "a brilliant social event," and "the most sumptuous bridal that ever graced the Buzzard's Bay shore." The couple had one child, Margaret "Peggy" Hardwick, born in 1917, who later married Richard Treadway.

Margaret Stone Hardwick filed for divorce in 1933, citing incompatibility; Hardwick told the press at the time that the breakup of the marriage was entirely his fault and that both parties regretted the action. In May 1947, she died, leaving an estate valued at $2.8 million to Hardwick and Peggy.

In September 1948, Hardwick married Manuela De Zanone-Poma, formerly of Barcelona, Spain, and Cannes, France.

=== Death and tributes ===
In June 1949, Hardwick died of a heart attack while clamming at Church's Beach on Cuttyhunk Island. Shortly after Hardwick's death, sports columnist Grantland Rice wrote a column about Hardwick in which he observed:

Tack Hardwick has been a close friend of mine for 35 years. Of all the college football players I've ever known since 1900, I would say he was top man in the matter of flaming spirit. He loved football with an intensity beyond belief. Tack was a great halfback and a great end. But above all, as a real tribute, he was a greater blocker and a greater tackler. He told me once that he would rather block or tackle than carry the ball to a touchdown. ... If football had a weakness for Hardwick it was that the game was not quite rough enough.

Rice described Hardwick as "a big, fine-looking aristocrat from blue-blood stock," who "loved combat—body contact at crushing force—a fight to the finish." He closed his column by noting, "College football will bring us many stars. But college football will never bring us another Tack Hardwick—the spirit of football."

In 1950, Harvard posthumously dedicated a memorial to Hardwick outside its football stadium, which shows him punting a football.

== Appraisal ==
Hardwick was posthumously elected to the College Football Hall of Fame as part of its second induction class in 1954.

Michigan football coach Fielding Yost named Hardwick to his all-time All-American team in 1920. Columnist Grantland Rice called Hardwick "dynamite on the football field" and selected him years later as one of the five greatest competitors he had ever seen, along with Ty Cobb, Walter Hagen and Jack Dempsey.

In 1969, in honor of the centennial of collegiate football, the Football Writers Association of America named two "College Football All-Time Teams" of eleven players—an "early" team consisting of players who played prior to 1920, and a "modern" team who played in 1920 and after. Hardwick was chosen as one of two ends on the pre-1920 squad.
