= Johnny Spiegel =

Playing career

Football
- 1910–1911: Lafayette
- 1913–1914: Washington & Jefferson
- Position: Halfback

Coaching career (HC unless noted)

Football
- 1915–1916: Chattanooga
- 1921–1922: Muhlenberg

Basketball
- 1915–1916: Chattanooga

Administrative career (AD unless noted)
- 1915–1916: Chattanooga

Head coaching record
- Overall: 19–15–4 (football); 2–4 (basketball)

Accomplishments and honors

Awards
- Consensus All-American (1914); Second-team All-American (1913)

John E. Spiegel was an American football player, coach of football and basketball, and college athletics administrator. A native of Detroit, Michigan, Spiegel played at the halfback position for Washington & Jefferson College from 1913 to 1914. He was selected as a second-team All-American in 1913 and was the leading scorer in college football. In 1914, he was a consensus first-team All-American. From 1915 to 1916, Spiegel was the football coach, basketball coach, and athletic director at the University of Chattanooga. After World War I, Spiegel coached at Muhlenberg College from 1921 to 1922.

== Head coaching record ==
=== Football ===
Year	Team	Overall	Conference	Standing	Bowl/playoffs
Chattanooga Moccasins (Southern Intercollegiate Athletic Association) (1915–1916)
1915	Chattanooga	5–2–2	3–1–2	7th	
1916	Chattanooga	3–5	0–4	T–22nd	
Chattanooga:		8–7–2			
Muhlenberg Cardinal and Grey (Independent) (1921–1922)
1921	Muhlenberg	7–2–1			
1922	Muhlenberg	4–6–1			
Muhlenberg:		11–8–2			
Total:		19–15–4			
