= John O'Hearn =

American football player (1893–1977)

Profile
- Position: End

Personal information
- Born: July 28, 1893; Brookline, Massachusetts, U.S.
- Died: July 22, 1977 (aged 83); Brookline, Massachusetts, U.S.
- Listed height: 5 ft 10 in (1.78 m)
- Listed weight: 173 lb (78 kg)

Career information
- College: Cornell

Career history
- Cleveland Tigers (1920); Buffalo All-Americans (1921)

Awards and highlights
- Consensus All-American (1914)
- Stats at Pro Football Reference
- College Football Hall of Fame

John Ewing O'Hearn (July 28, 1893 – July 22, 1977) was an American professional football player who was an end in the National Football League (NFL). He played in 1920 with the Cleveland Tigers and in 1921 with the Buffalo All-Americans. O'Hearn graduated from Cornell University, where he was a member of the Sphinx Head Society. He was elected to the College Football Hall of Fame in 1972.

His younger brother, Ed O'Hearn, played for the NFL's New York Brickley Giants in 1921. Both brothers played for the Tigers in 1920.
