= Walter S. Trumbull =

American sportswriter (1880–1961)

Walter Slater Trumbull
- Born: 1880; Chicago, Illinois
- Died: 1961; Newtown, Connecticut

Walter Slater Trumbull (4 December 1880 Chicago – 18 October 1961 Newtown, Connecticut) was an American sportswriter in the 20th century.

He resided in Newtown, Connecticut. He attended Trinity College, where he excelled as a member of the football team, playing nearly every position at one time or another.

He was a nationally syndicated sports columnist, appearing in a variety of publications. He worked as sports editor of the New York Sun.

Trumbull died in 1961.
