= Lorin Solon =

American football player (1892–1967)

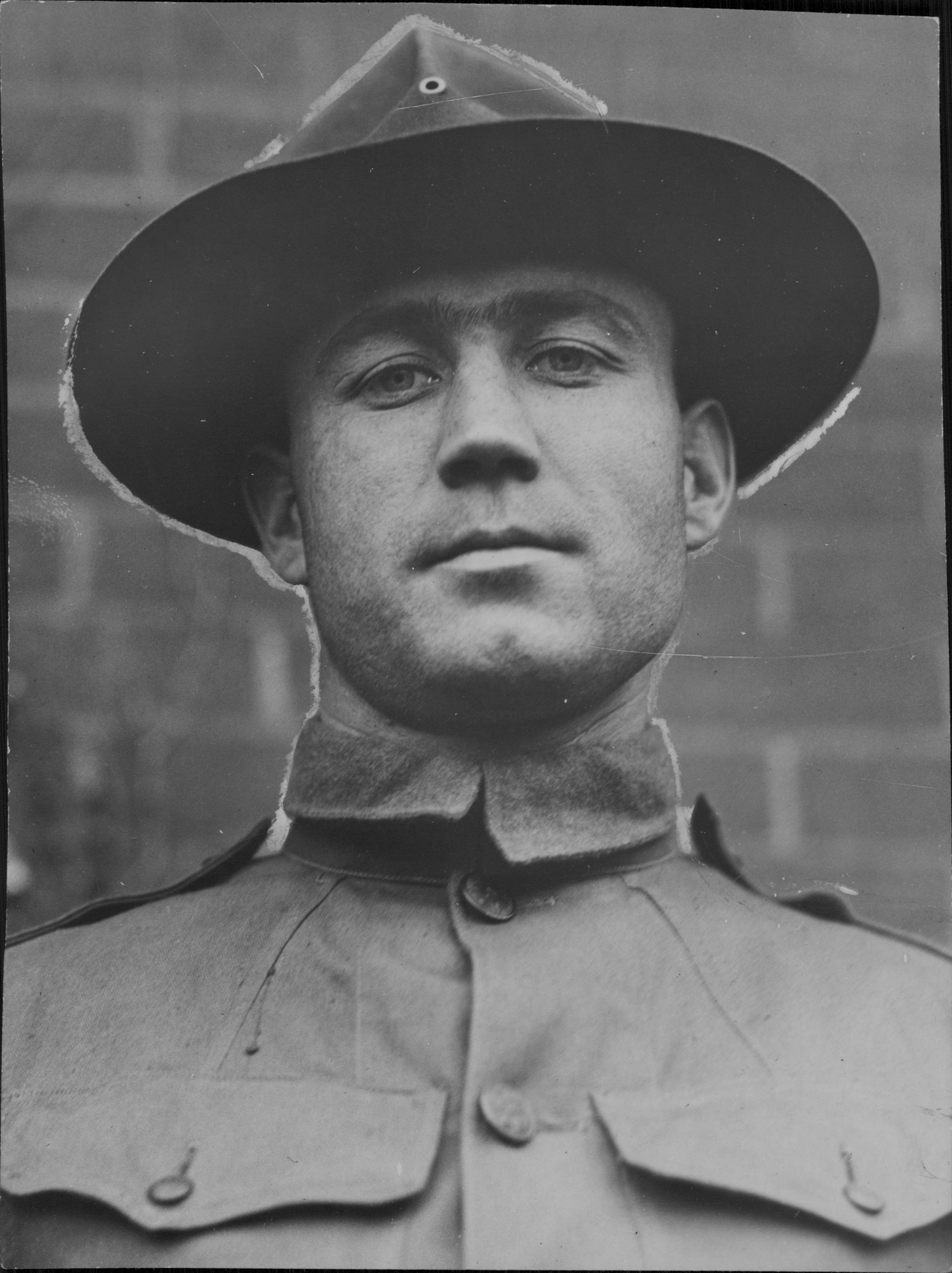

Minnesota Golden Gophers
- Position: Fullback/End

Personal information
- Born: March 1, 1892
- Died: March, 1967

Career information
- College: Minnesota

Awards and highlights
- 2× Second-team All-American (1913, 1914); 2× First-team All-Western (1913, 1914)

Lorin Solon (March 1, 1892 – March 1967) was an All-American football player who played at the end and fullback positions for the University of Minnesota.

Solon was the Gophers' "surest ground gainer, its best goal kicker, a great defense player, and the best man on the squad in receiving forward passes," and was selected as an All-American in 1913 and 1914. Solon also played baseball as a catcher for Minnesota's baseball team. In October 1915, Solon was found "guilty of professionalism" and declared ineligible for further participation in college athletics. The charge arose out of his accepting cash to play summer baseball under the name "Stone" on the Havre, Montana team.

In February 1916, Solon announced he had signed to play professional baseball with the Richmond, Virginia team in the International League. He also played professional football for Duluth, and Peggy Parratt's Cleveland Indians. In November 1916, the signing of Solon by the Indians was covered by a Massillon paper as follows:

"Parratt has built his team for tomorrow's battle around Lorin Solon, the Minnesota star, whom he secured Thursday from Duluth. Solon is the greatest fullback the west has developed in many years, and Peggy is counting on the Gopher luminary to tear the [Massillon] Tiger line to shreds. If Solon accomplishes this feat, he will be the first person to do so this season."

Solon later worked for the Alexander Film Co.

== See also ==
- 1913 College Football All-America Team
- 1914 College Football All-America Team
