= Bud Talbott =

American football player and coach (1892–1952)

Profile
- Positions: Halfback, Tackle

Personal information
- Born: June 10, 1892; Dayton, Ohio, U.S.
- Died: July 6, 1952 (aged 60)
- Listed height: 6 ft 1 in (1.85 m)
- Listed weight: 190 lb (86 kg)

Career information
- College: Yale

Career history

Playing
- 1916: Dayton Triangles
- 1917–1918: Camp Sherman
- 1919–1921: Dayton Triangles

Coaching
- 1916: Dayton Triangles
- 1919–1921: Dayton Triangles
- 1920–1921: Dayton

Awards and highlights
- Consensus All-American (1913); Co-founder of the Dayton Triangles
- Coaching profile at Pro Football Reference

Other information
- Military career
- Allegiance: United States
- Branch: U.S. Army; U.S. Air Force
- Rank: Brigadier General
- Conflicts: World War I World War II; Korean War

Nelson Strobridge "Bud" Talbott (June 10, 1892 – July 6, 1952) was an American football player and coach. He served as the head coach of the Dayton Triangles of the "Ohio League" and later a charter member of the National Football League (NFL). Talbott joined the United States Army in 1917 and served in World War I, World War II and the Korean War, rising to the rank of brigadier general. He retired as the deputy director of procurement and production at Air Materiel Command, located at Wright-Patterson Air Force Base.

Talbott began his football career as a starting tackle and halfback from 1912 to 1914, for Yale University. He was a consensus selection to the 1913 College Football All-America Team. In 1914, he was named captain of the Yale team. Bud led Yale to a 28–0 victory over Notre Dame, ending the Fighting Irish 27-game undefeated streak. He repeated with All-American honors in 1914, making several major newspaper first teams.

After graduation, he became one of the organizers of the Dayton Triangles professional football team. He coached the local team in 1916 and again from 1919 until 1921. From 1922 until 1923, he was head coach of the University of Dayton football team which had just changed its name from St. Mary's University.

== Family ==
Talbott's father was a wealthy engineer who was involved in the construction of the Soo Locks on Lake Superior and had various railroad interests. He was also involved in the recovery of Dayton from a 1913 flood. His mother was active in the Dayton anti-suffrage league which opposed giving women the right to vote. She was also involved in the Anti-Saloon League and was a patron of the Dayton Westminster Choir. His brother, Harold E. Talbott, was the third Secretary of the Air Force. One grandson, Strobe Talbott, was a deputy secretary of state in the Clinton administration. Another grandson, Mark Talbott, is a former professional squash player and was inducted into the United States Squash Hall of Fame in 2000. His great-grandson, Devin Talbott, is an entrepreneur and private investor focused on the aerospace, defense & government sector.

== Head coaching record ==
=== College ===
Year	Team	Overall	Conference	Standing	Bowl/playoffs
Dayton (Independent) (1920)
1920	Dayton	2–4			
Dayton (Independent) (1921)
1921	Dayton	1–0 (Note: Charley Way served as head coach for the first eight games of the 1921 season, leading Dayton to a record of 0–7–1 before resigning on November 23. Talbott coached the final game of the season. Dayton finished 1–7–1 overall.)			
Dayton:		3–4			
Total:		3–4			
