= Walter H. Trumbull =

American football player (1893–1976)

Walter Trumbull
Harvard Crimson
- Positions: Tackle, Center

Personal information
- Born: July 16, 1893; Salem, Massachusetts, U.S.
- Died: December 13, 1976 (aged 83); Boston, Massachusetts, U.S.

Career information
- College: Harvard (1914)

Awards and highlights
- Consensus All-American (1914)

Walter Henry Trumbull (July 16, 1893 – December 13, 1976) was an American football player for the Harvard Crimson football team.

== Playing career ==
Trumbull attended Middlesex School in Concord, Massachusetts before enrolling at Harvard College. He played at the tackle and center positions for Percy Haughton's Harvard Crimson football from 1912 to 1914. During Trumbull's three years as a starter for Harvard, the football team did not lose a single game compiling records of 9–0 in 1912, 9–0 in 1913, and 7–0–2 in 1914. In December 1913, he placed second to Charles Brickley in voting among his teammates for the position of captain of the 1914 team. Trumbull was selected as a first-team All-American at the tackle position in 1914. His son, Wally Trumbull Jr., played for Harvard during the 1940s.

== Later life ==
During World War I, Trumbull was rejected for military service due to poor eyesight. He instead joined the Army and Navy YMCA in France and was placed in charge of motion picture work. After the war, he returned to Boston and worked as a stock broker. He was a partner in Kidder, Peabody & Company and later worked for E. A. Pierce & Co. He left the brokerage business in 1938 to become the director of admissions at the Middlesex School. He retired in 1948 and spent one year with the United Nations as the coordinator of government contributions to UNICEF. He also served as the president of the Harvard Club and national vice-chairman of Harvard Divinity School's endowment fund drive. He died on December 13, 1976 in Boston after a lengthy illness.
