= Ralph Chapman (American football) =

American football player (1892–1969)

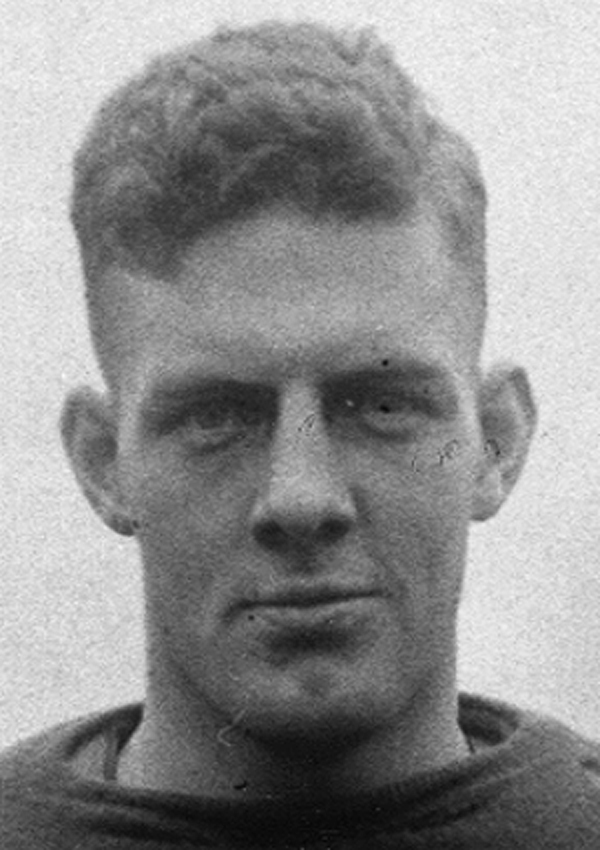

Illinois Fighting Illini
- Position: Guard

Personal information
- Born: May 8, 1892; Vienna, Illinois, U.S.
- Died: August 1969

Career information
- College: Illinois (1912–1914)

Awards and highlights
- National championship (1914); Consensus All-American (1914); First-team All-Western (1914)

Ralph D. "Slouie" Chapman (May 8, 1892 – August 1969) was an American football player. He was the son of P. T. Chapman, a wealthy banker in Vienna, Illinois. He played at the guard position for Robert Zuppke's University of Illinois football team from 1912 to 1914. Chapman was selected as the captain of the 1914 Illinois football team and a first-team All-American at the guard position in 1914. After graduating from Illinois, Chapman went into business in Chicago. When the United States entered World War I in 1917, he applied for and was accepted into the officers' training program at Fort Sheridan. He was commissioned a first lieutenant was among the first contingent of reserve officers training camp graduates to be sent to France. He was wounded and erroneously reported to have been killed in action in France in 1918. He survived his injuries and entered the brokerage business in Chicago following the war. He also served as vice president of the UI Foundation. He died in 1969 at age 77.
