= Frank G. Menke =

American newspaper reporter, author, and sports historian

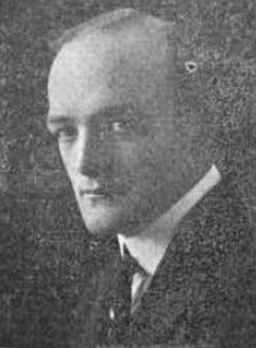
- Frank G. Menke, 1920
- Born: October 10, 1885; Cleveland, Ohio, U.S.
- Died: May 13, 1954 (aged 68); Cincinnati, Ohio, U.S.
- Occupations: Sportswriter, author
- Years active: 1907–1954

Frank Grant Menke (October 10, 1885 – May 13, 1954) was an American newspaper reporter, author, and sports historian. He wrote for the Hearst Newspapers from 1912 to 1932 and his articles appeared daily in 300 newspapers across the country. He was billed by the Hearst syndicate as "America's Foremost Sport Writer". He later devoted much of his effort to his work as an author of books on sports history. Two of his works, The All Sports Record Book and The Encyclopedia of Sports, became known as authoritative reference works that were revised and reissued for several decades.

== Early years ==
He was born in Cleveland, Ohio in 1885. His father, Christopher J. Menke, was an Ohio native and a printer. He worked in construction as a teenager and played semi-professional baseball as a pitcher and outfielder. From 1906 to 1911, he worked as a reporter for the Cleveland Press and the Cleveland News.

== Sports writer and editor for Hearst newspapers ==
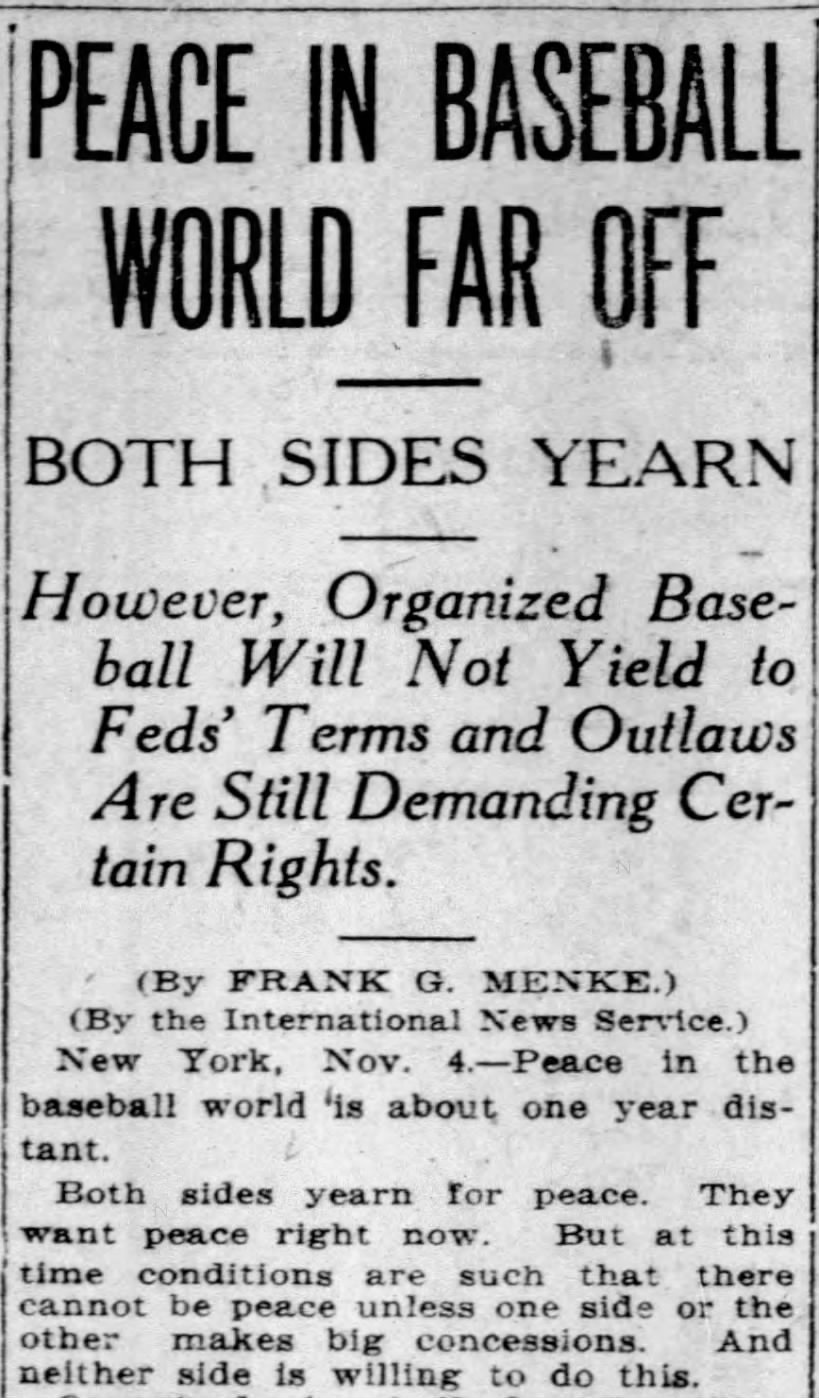
Headline and lead of a November 1914 article written by Menke discussing tension between organized baseball and the Federal League ("Feds").

In 1911, Menke moved to New York and, in 1912, became a sportswriter for the International News Service (INS) the wire service for the Hearst newspapers. He remained with the INS until late 1916 when he formed The Menke Syndicate, Inc. By March 1917, Menke returned to the Hearst newspapers as a feature writer and sports editor for Hearst's Newspaper Feature Service, also known as the King Features Syndicate. Menke's daily sports column appeared in 300 newspapers across the United States and Canada in the late 1910s and early 1920s and was translated into Spanish, French and Chinese for publication abroad. He was billed by the Hearst newspapers as "America's Foremost Sport Writer" and the "'Babe Ruth' of the Scribes". In 1931, Bill Ritt, sports editor of a competing syndicate, paid tribute to Menke:

Should sports writers, in congress assembled, ever decide to award a medal to the scribe who has given the most meritorious service in behalf of his fellow laborers in the athletic vineyards, this department's nomination would be Frank G. Menke. Menke for many years a nationally known sports writer, is also the Lincoln, the Bancroft, the Emil Ludwig, the Sherlock Holmes of sideline scribblers.

From 1913 to 1922, Menke's college football All-America team selections were published in newspapers across the United States.

From 1918 through the 1920s, Menke wrote about no athlete more frequently than Jack Dempsey. The two became friends, and Menke was long a supporter of Dempsey. In 1926, Dempsey went into the horse racing business and named a thoroughbred hose "Frank G. Menke" after Menke.

Menke spent one year as the editor of the New York Press in 1934.

== Author ==
Menke also worked with Ty Cobb, Gene Tunney, and James J. Corbett on their autobiographies and ghost wrote articles for Babe Ruth. In 1929, Menke published The All Sports Record Book, which was re-issued and updated annually throughout the 1930s. In 1939, he published a new work, The Encyclopedia of Sports. He thereafter published revised and expanded editions of his encyclopedia through 1953. The final edition of The Encyclopedia of Sports published during Menke's lifetime was 1,018 pages. It was periodically updated with revised editions being published even after his death. The sixth revised edition, published in 1978, covered 68 major sports in 1,125 pages.

As baseball prepared to celebrate the centennial of the sport in 1939, Menke released the results of his research showing that the sport was not invented in 1839 by Abner Doubleday in Cooperstown, New York. Menke first published his findings in a magazine called Ken and then reprinted in the first edition of The Encyclopedia of Sports, which was released in February 1939. Menke concluded that the game had been played along the East Coast since at least 1805 and pointed out that Doubleday was 20 years old and enrolled at a military academy when he was supposed to have invented the game. While the quality of Menke's research was acknowledged by leading newspapers including The Sporting News, the Little Falls Times, a newspaper serving the Cooperstown area, wrote that Menke had an ulterior motive for his claims and belonged to "the class that would belittle Washington, Lincoln and other men who have played their part in American history".

In the late 1930s and 1940s, Menke worked for eight years as the publicity director for Churchill Downs, the home of the Kentucky Derby. During his years working with Churchill Downs, he published several books about horse racing, including The Story of Churchill Downs and the Kentucky Derby (1940), Churchill Downs and the Kentucky Derby Since 1875 (1942), Down the Stretch: The Story of Colonel Matt J. Winn (1945), and Harness Horse History (1945).

== Family and death ==
In May 1954, Menke died in his hotel room in Cincinnati, after suffering a heart attack while returning from a vacation in California to his home in Fairfield.
