= St Edward's Church =

St Edward's Church may refer to:

== Churches dedicated to Edward the Confessor ==
- St Edward the Confessor Church, Golders Green, London, England
- St Edward's Church, Hockley, Birmingham, England
- St Edward's Church, Kempley, Gloucestershire, England
- St. Edward Church (Little Rock, Arkansas), United States
- St Edward's Church, Roath, Cardiff, Wales
- Church of St Edward the Confessor, Romford, London, England
- St Edward the Confessor Catholic Church, Romford, London, England
- St Edward's Church, Sanday, Scotland
- St Edward's Church, Selly Park, Birmingham, England
- St Edward's Church, Stow-on-the-Wold, Gloucestershire, England
- St. Edward's Catholic Church, Shamokin, Pennsylvania, United States

== Churches dedicated to Edward the Martyr ==
- Church of St Edward the Martyr, Brookwood, Surrey, England
- Church of St Edward King and Martyr, Goathurst, Somerset, England
- Church of St Edward, King of the West Saxons, a Grade II* listed building in Plymouth, England
- St Edward King and Martyr, Cambridge, England

== See also ==
- St Edward's Church of England School, London, England
