= Saint Edward =

Saint Edward, Saint Edward's, St. Edward and St. Edward's may refer to:

== People ==
- Saint Edward the Confessor (1004–1066)
- Saint Edward the Martyr (c. 962 – 978/979)

== Education ==
=== England, United Kingdom ===
- St Edward's School, Cheltenham, Gloucestershire
- St Edward's School, Oxford, a boarding school
- St. Edward's College, in Liverpool
- St. Edward's School, Cheltenham, a secondary school
- St. Edwards Church of England School, a secondary school located in Romford
- St Edwards Catholic Junior School, Aylesbury, Buckinghamshire

=== United States ===
- Saint Edward Catholic School (Lowell, Indiana), an elementary school
- Saint Edwards School, a college preparatory high school in Vero Beach, Florida
- St. Edward High School (Lakewood, Ohio), a boys-only college preparatory high school
- St. Edward Seminary, (1930–1976), in Kenmore, Washington
- St. Edward's University, in Austin, Texas
- St. Edward's High School, in Austin, Texas
- St. Edward's Hall (University of Notre Dame), in Notre Dame, Indiana
- St. Edward Central Catholic High School (Elgin, Illinois)
- St. Edward High School (Nebraska), St. Edward, Nebraska

=== Elsewhere ===
- St Edward's College, East Gosford, a school in Gosford, New South Wales, Australia
- St. Edward's College, Malta, a boys' school in Cottonera
- St. Edward's School, Shimla, a boys' convent school in Himachal Pradesh, India

== Churches ==
- St. Edward Church (Little Rock, Arkansas), listed on the National Register of Historic Places
- St Edward's Church, Stow-on-the-Wold, a Norman church in Gloucestershire, England
- Saint Edward Catholic Church, Pembroke Pines, in Florida
- Saint Edward State Park, in Kenmore, Washington
- Church of St Edward, a 15th-century church in Eggbuckland, Plymouth
- Church of St. Edward, Busto Arsizio, a 20th-century church in Lombardy, Italy
- St. Edward's Catholic Church, Shamokin, Pennsylvania

== Other uses ==
- St. Edward, Nebraska, a city in Boone County
- St. Edward's Crown, used at the coronation of the British monarch
- St. Edward's Chair, alternate name for King Edward's Chair, used at the British Coronation

== See also ==
- Saint Edouard (disambiguation)
