= Henry Aurand =

United States Army general (1894–1980)

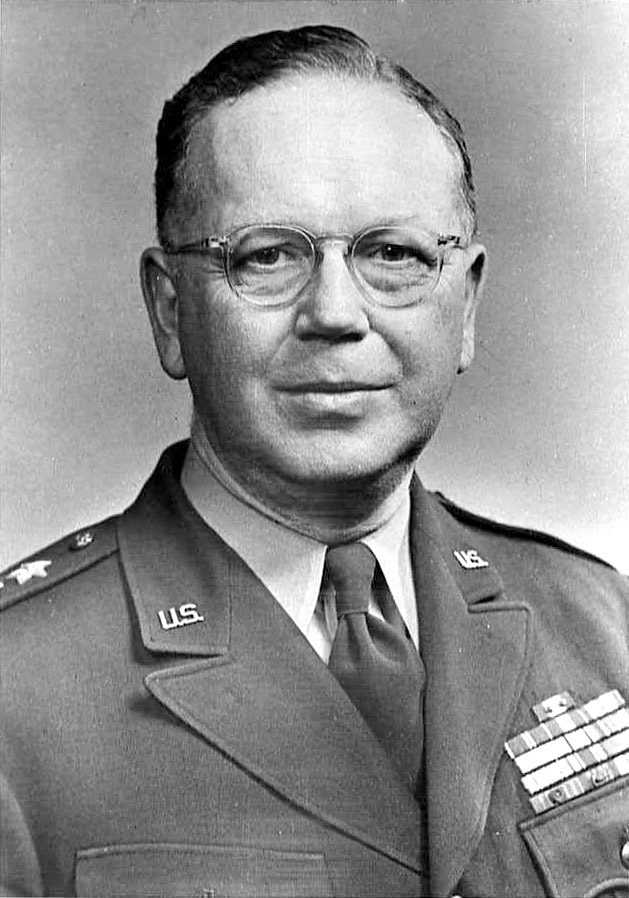
- Lieutenant General Henry S. Aurand
- Born: April 21, 1894; Tamaqua, Pennsylvania, U.S.
- Died: June 18, 1980 (aged 86); Laguna Hills, California, U.S.
- Burial place: Arlington National Cemetery
- Relatives: Evan Peter Aurand
- Military career
- Allegiance: United States
- Branch: United States Army
- Service years: 1915–1952
- Rank: Lieutenant General
- Service number: O-3784
- Units: Coast Artillery Corps; Ordnance Corps
- Commands: Sixth Service Command; Normandy Base Section; Services of Supply, China Theater; United States Army Pacific
- Conflicts: Mexican Expedition; World War II
- Awards: Army Distinguished Service Medal (3); Bronze Star Medal; Mexican Service Medal; World War I Victory Medal; American Defense Medal; American Campaign Medal; Asiatic-Pacific Campaign Medal; European-African-Middle Eastern Campaign Medal; World War II Victory Medal; Croix de Guerre (France); Officer of the Legion of Honor (France); Companion of the Order of the Bath (UK); Special Collar Order of Yun Hui Medal (China); Grand Officer of the Order of the Liberator General San Martín (Argentina)

Lieutenant General Henry Spiese Aurand (April 21, 1894 – June 18, 1980) was a United States Army career officer. He was a veteran of the Mexican Expedition and World War II. A graduate of the United States Military Academy at West Point, New York, Aurand was ranked 20th in the class of 1915, known as "the class the stars fell on" because no fewer than 59 of the 164 members of the class who graduated became generals. His classmates included Dwight D. Eisenhower and Omar Bradley, both of whom later achieved five-star rank. He was commissioned in the Coast Artillery Corps, but later transferred to the Ordnance Department.

He served on the Mexican border during the Pancho Villa Expedition, was an assistant to the officer in charge of the design and construction of the Aberdeen Proving Ground, and was at the Sandy Hook Proving Ground from 1917 to 1919. Between the wars Aurand attended Ordnance School at the Watertown Arsenal in 1921–1922, the Army Command and Staff College at Fort Leavenworth, Kansas 1927–1928, the Army War College in 1930–1931, and the Army Industrial College in 1939–1940. He served in the Philippines from 1925 to 1927, and on the faculty of the Ordnance School at Watertown Arsenal from 1929 to 1930. From 1933 to 1937, he was an instructor in logistics at the Army War College.

During World War II Aurand was the director of Defense Aid, the program that sent Lend Lease materials to the Allies. He became the chief of the International Division, Army Service Forces in 1942 and later that year the secretary of the Combined Production and Resources Board. In September 1942 he became the commanding general of the Sixth Service Command, based in Chicago, Illinois. In 1944, Aurand was assigned as the assistant chief ordnance officer, European Theater of Operations, United States Army (ETOUSA) and Communications Zone (COMZ). He became the commanding general, Normandy Base Section, in December 1944. In May 1945, he went to the China Theater as the commanding general, United States Army Services of Supply there.

Aurand returned to the United States as the commanding general of the Sixth Service Command, and he was commander of the Africa-Middle East Theater in 1946. In June 1946, he became the last director of research and development, War Department. In 1948, he became the director of logistics, Department of the Army. His final assignment was as commanding general, United States Army, Pacific, a position he held until his retirement in 1952.

== Early life ==
Henry Spiese Aurand was born in Tamaqua, Pennsylvania, on April 21, 1894, the only child of Peter Augustus Aurand, a conductor on the Philadelphia and Reading Railroad, and his wife Annie née Speise. When he was eleven years old, the family moved from Tamaqua to Shamokin, Pennsylvania. He attended Shamokin Area High School, where he played violin in the school orchestra, captained the debating team, and edited the school literary magazine. His ambition was to go to Pennsylvania State College and become a civil engineer, but he sat the examination for the United States Military Academy at West Point, New York, and received a nomination as an alternative. When the principal candidate failed the physical examination, Aurand wrote to his United States Congressman, John Geiser McHenry, declining the nomination. McHenry replied that he had already been declined twice, and would not take no for an answer. After a family discussion, it was decided that Aurand would go to West Point, serve the minimum four years, and then complete postgraduate engineer training at Pennsylvania State College.

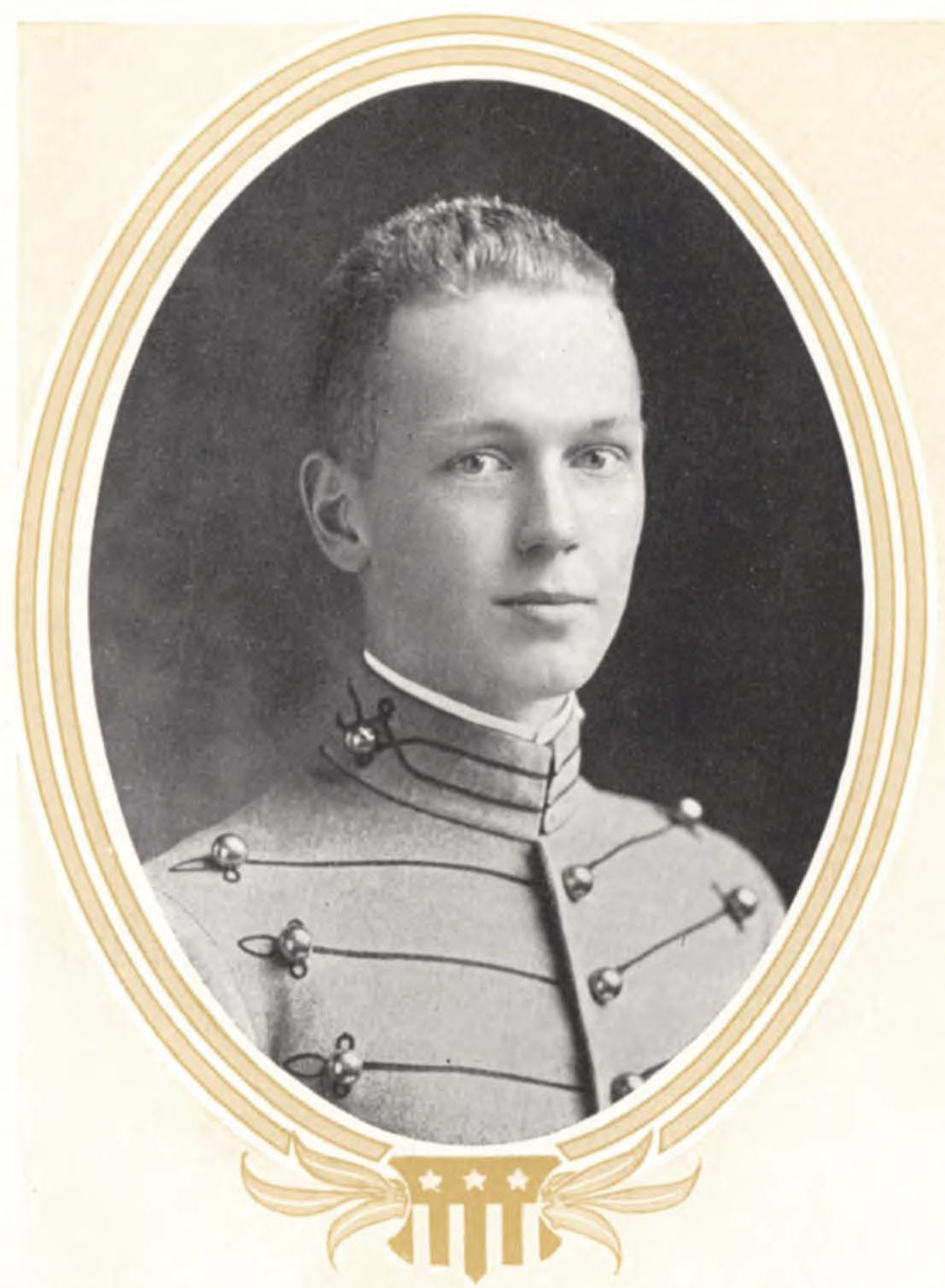
At West Point in 1915

Aurand entered West Point on June 14, 1911, becoming a member of the class of 1915, which became known as "the class the stars fell on" because no less than 59 of the 164 members of the class who graduated became generals. His classmates included Dwight Eisenhower and Omar Bradley. West Point cadets chose which of the five combat arms of the Army (infantry, cavalry, field artillery, coast artillery or engineers) they would join with each nominating in order of class rank, limited only by the quotas set by each arm. Aurand was ranked twentieth in the class, which was high enough to have a completely free choice. Most of the highest-ranking cadets (and indeed all those ranked above Aurand) chose to join the engineers, but Aurand chose the Coast Artillery, in the hope of eventually transferring to the Ordnance Department and becoming a mechanical engineer. He graduated and was commissioned a second lieutenant in the Coast Artillery on June 12, 1915.

== World War I ==
Aurand's first posting was to the 169th Company at Fort Monroe, Virginia, from September 11, 1915, to April 15, 1916. He then went to Fort Oglethorpe, Georgia, but on June 2 was sent to El Paso, Texas, where he was in charge of civilian truck companies supporting the Pancho Villa Expedition in Mexico. He was promoted to first lieutenant on July 1. While there, he married Margaret John (Peggy) Decker, the sister of a fellow officer, in San Antonio, Texas, on July 13, 1916. Her father, Davis Evan Decker, was a Texas state senator and judge; her grandmother, Nancy Elizabeth Morrow, was the oldest daughter of Sam Houston. They had two children: Evan Peter Aurand, who graduated from the United States Naval Academy with the class of 1938, and eventually rose to the rank of vice admiral; and Henry (Hank) Spiese Aurand Jr., who graduated from West Point with the class of 1944.

From October 3, 1916, to November 1, 1917, Aurand was a student officer at the Ordnance School at the Sandy Hook Proving Ground. He was promoted to captain on July 25, 1917. His first assignment with the Ordnance Department was an assistant to the officer in charge of the design and construction of the Aberdeen Proving Ground, Major William R. King. He was promoted to major in the Ordnance Department on January 14, 1918. He returned to the Sandy Hook Proving Ground, where he spent the rest of World War I working with civilian scientists on the development of flashless propellant.

== Between the wars ==
After the war ended, Aurand returned to Fort Monroe on April 7, 1919, as the ordnance officer at the Coast Artillery Training Center. On March 21, 1920, he reported to Fort Sam Houston, Texas, as Assistant Ordnance Officer of the Southern Department. He reverted to his substantive rank of captain on May 17. Two days later he became the Adjutant and Disbursing Officer at the San Antonio Arsenal. His wife Peggy left him, and divorced him. He formally transferred to the Ordnance Department on July 1, 1920, with the rank of major, but reverted to captain again on November 4, 1922.

From September 10, 1921, to November 6, 1922, Aurand was a student officer at the Ordnance School at the Watertown Arsenal in Massachusetts, and took a summer course at the Massachusetts Institute of Technology. He differed with the senior instructor at the Watertown Arsenal, arguing that ordnance officers should be trained in field repairs, leaving the complex tasks to civilians. As a result, he received an adverse efficiency report that rated him as being deficient in military bearing, neatness, tact and judgement, and recommended that he be given field service assignments only. This ended any prospect of his being given a mechanical engineering position. In November he remarried Peggy; their son Peter was a ring bearer at the wedding. On November 6, 1922, Aurand became the Ordnance Officer for the V Corps Area at Fort Hayes, Ohio. In this role he supervised the training of National Guard units from Indiana, Kentucky, Ohio and West Virginia, and in November 1923 he prepared mobilization plans for the Corps Area.

The officers of the Army who have come to grips with the manifold problems of supply are few and far between, and what is more important, have been neglected in promotion because they have been away from the command of combat units. Their one ambition, therefore, is to get away from supply duty.

— Henry S. Aurand

Promoted to major in the Ordnance Department for the third time on January 8, 1924, Aurand went to Washington, D.C., on August 18, as a staff officer in the office of the Chief of Field Service in the Ordnance Department. His next assignment was as Ordnance Officer of the Harbor Defenses of Manila and Subic Bays. It commander, Colonel Stanley D. Embick, recognized his ability and made him his G-4, the staff officer responsible for logistics. He told Aurand that this was where his true talent lay and he should forget about engineering. On Embick's recommendation, Aurand attended the Command and Staff College at Fort Leavenworth, Kansas, after which he returned to Fort Hayes as the G-4 of the V Corps Area from June 27, 1928, to August 16, 1930. In November 1929, Peggy divorced him a second time.

From August 17, 1930, to June 30, 1931, Aurand was one of the two Ordnance Department officers to attend the Army War College that academic year. He produced a study of Germany's mobilization during World War I, and one of the British Zeebrugge Raid. He returned to Washington, D.C., where he worked on a special study. He then produced a new ordnance field manual. He was critical of the Army's mobilization policies, and advocated replacement of horse-drawn transport with motor vehicles. This was followed by duty at the Watertown Arsenal, Raritan Arsenal and Aberdeen Proving Ground.

With the help of his West Point classmate Eisenhower, who was now the aide-de-camp to the Army Chief of Staff, General Douglas MacArthur, Aurand secured an appointment to the War College faculty. On February 2, 1933, he married Elizabeth (Betty) Steele from Shamokin, Pennsylvania. They had a daughter, Linda. At the War College he taught a course on "Supply and Transportation in the Theatre of Operations". He was critical of the make up of the faculty, which he felt contained too many men from the combat arms. Of the seven most important posts—the commandant (Major General Malin Craig), assistant commandant and five directors—five were from the cavalry arm. He was promoted to lieutenant colonel on April 1, 1936. This was followed by a tour of duty at the Picatinny Arsenal from June 28, 1937, to September 6, 1939, when he left to attend the Army Industrial College.

At the Army Industrial College, Aurand had assisted in the production and development of an industrial mobilization plan, but he had been critical of the process. He argued that the notion of defining grand strategy (ends), determining how to pursue it (ways), and then deciding what resources can be applied (means), had the process backwards: the means should be determined first, and realistic ways and ends derived from them. He believed that logistics was the decisive factor in modern warfare, and rejected the cautious assumption that the public would not countenance the creation of the machinery for industrial mobilization in peacetime. He submitted an article to the Army Ordnance journal in which he attacked the Ordnance Department's approach to ammunition design. While the editor liked the article, the Office of the Chief of Ordnance deemed it too controversial, and refused permission for its publication.

== World War II ==
=== United States ===
Aurand's controversial views and stubborn insistence that he was right may have resulted in his next assignment, as Assistant Fiscal Officer at the War Department, which was generally considered a dead-end job. He complained about the assignment to Colonels Russell L. Maxwell and Walter M. Robertson, and they arranged for him to meet with Brigadier General Richard C. Moore, the G-4 of the War Department General Staff. Moore was sufficiently impressed to have Aurand's orders changed, reassigning him as Chief of the G-4 Requirements and Distribution Section in June 1940. His former West Point roommate, Lieutenant Colonel Albert W. Waldron, was his deputy, and his staff included Major Anthony McAuliffe. In this role he helped prepare estimates of the Army's requirements for the Chief of Staff, General George C. Marshall, to submit to the Bureau of the Budget and Congress. Industrial mobilization took on a new urgency. On January 7, 1941, President Franklin D. Roosevelt created the Office of Production Management (OPM) under William S. Knudsen to coordinate the industrial mobilization process with an executive order. Aurand worked with Knudsen, Stacy May, the Chief of the OPM Bureau of Research and Statistics, and Robert R. Nathan from the Commerce Department to determine the materiel requirements to mobilize an army of 500,000 by July 1, 1941, and 2,000,000 by July 1, 1942. This went into the Munitions Program of June 30, 1940, for which the Army requested $3.97 billion.

Aurand advocated the establishment of a Transportation Corps, and the creation of a consolidated logistical system. He supported arming aircraft with cannon, and urged the adoption of the jeep. He observed the Louisiana Maneuvers, spending an afternoon with Eisenhower, who was now the Chief of Staff of the Third United States Army, and with his G-4, Lieutenant Colonel LeRoy Lutes. Aurand considered the performance of the logistical units in the maneuvers to be poor, but he was impressed with an IBM keypunch and sorting machine. The supply of arms and munitions to the British became a contentious issue. Aurand had to take the needs of the British and Canadians into account as well as the American forces. He dealt with a British delegation headed by Lieutenant Colonel Donald Campion. Brigadier General George V. Strong, the chief of the War Plans Division (WPD), felt that Britain had already been defeated and that the US should concentrate on building up its own forces, which were suffering from shortages of all kinds. The Assistant Secretary of War John C. McCloy argued unsuccessfully for the peacetime draft to be deferred until the troops could be adequately equipped. Aurand prepared a study that formed the basis of the initial $7 billion Lend Lease appropriation.

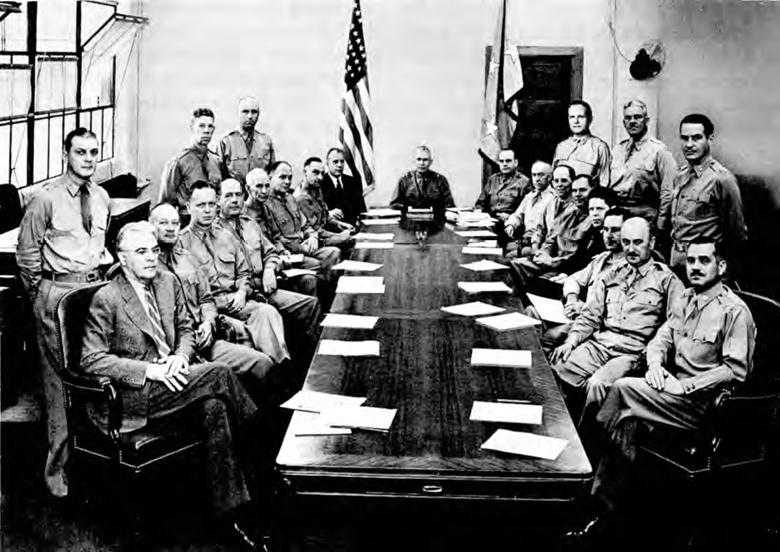
Weekly Staff Conference at United States Army Services of Supply (USASOS) headquarters in June 1942. Aurand is seated. third from the left.

A Directorate of Defense Aid was created in October 1941 to administer the Lend Lease Program, and to his dismay, Aurand, who had hoped to be able to concentrate on the Army's supply problems, was appointed its director. As such he was answerable to four masters: McCloy; Robert A. Lovett, the Assistant Secretary of War for Air; Robert P. Patterson, the Under Secretary of War; and Major General Brehon B. Somervell, who had replaced Moore as G-4. Aurand was promoted to brigadier general on January 30, 1942. In March 1942, the United States Army Services of Supply (USASOS) was created under Somervell. Aurand became the head of its International Division, which was placed under the USASOS Assistant Chief of Staff for Requirements and Resources, Major General Lucius D. Clay. Aurand's authority was circumscribed, with some functions transferred to Clay and others to the Operations Division of the War Department General Staff, leaving the International Division as little more than a statistical reporting organization. On June 20, 1942, Aurand left the USASOS to become secretary of the Combined Resources and Production Board (CPB); Somervell and Patterson had pushed hard for Aurand's appointment, possibly to get rid of him, and Jean Monnet had pushed for it from the British side. Donald Nelson was the head of the American half of the CPB, but he served on a part-time basis, so Aurand was left effectively in charge. Differences between Clay and Aurand over Lend-Lease allocations therefore continued.

Somervell could not fire Aurand, since he no longer worked for him, but after another clash between Clay and Aurand over Lend-Lease allocations in September 1942, Somervell offered Aurand the command of the Sixth Service Command, with the promise of a promotion to major general. Aurand knew that he was being kicked upstairs, but decided to accept. He assumed the command and was promoted to the rank on September 8, 1942. McCloy told him that he was selling his soul for a piece of tinsel. The service commands were the successors to the old corps areas, and acted as field commands of the USASOS. They operated recruiting stations and induction centers, and provided housekeeping and supply services to Army bases located in their region. Most service command commanders were older officers; at age 48, Aurand was the youngest. The Sixth Service Command had its headquarters in Chicago, Illinois, and was responsible for facilities in Michigan, Illinois, Indiana and Wisconsin.

Most of Aurand's command was made up of men classified as 1-B, unfit for general service (1-A), but suitable for services on bases in the United States. Use of 1-B personnel freed up 1-A personnel for duty overseas. Since they were permanently assigned, the 1-B personnel generally became quite efficient at their jobs. Aurand sent all his new 1-B recruits through basic training at Camp McCoy, Wisconsin. As manpower began to run short in 1943 and 1944, he zealously implemented Somervell's directives to replace as many 1-A personnel with 1-B as possible. During the 1943 Detroit race riot, he deployed a military police battalion stationed at River Rouge Park. The mayor of Detroit, Edward Jeffries, later criticized Aurand for a tardy response to the crisis, which was due to not receiving a timely request for assistance from the governor of Michigan, Harry Kelly. But Aurand's most intractable problem was drumming up recruits for the Women's Army Auxiliary Corps (WAAC). His young daughter Linda became the mascot of the WAAC detachment at Fort Sheridan, and scenes of father and daughter inspecting the troops appeared in newsreels. Such public relations events were an important part of his role, and he even had a weekly radio talk show, The General's Review on station WBBM. This led to a series called 21 Stars that highlighted the work of each of the service commands, and was broadcast on the Blue Network in 1944. For his services as commander of the Sixth Service Command, Aurand was awarded the Army Distinguished Service Medal. The citation for the medal reads:

The President of the United States of America, authorized by Act of Congress July 9, 1918, takes pleasure in presenting the Army Distinguished Service Medal to Major General Henry Spiese Aurand (ASN: 0-3784), United States Army, for exceptionally meritorious and distinguished services to the Government of the United States, in a duty of great responsibility as Commanding General, 6th Service Command, during the period from 8 September 1942 to 26 October 1944. The singularly distinctive accomplishments of General Aurand reflect the highest credit upon himself and the United States Army.

=== European Theater ===
One conspicuous officer at the Sixth Service Command available for overseas duty was Aurand himself. While he welcomed the prospect, he felt that with his background the most likely assignment would be in command of an atoll somewhere in the Pacific. Suddenly, on October 20, 1944, he received a call from Major General Wilhelm D. Styer, the Chief of Staff of the Army Service Forces, as USASOS had been renamed in March 1943. Aurand was ordered to go to the European Theater of Operations (ETO). During a stopover in Washington en route, Aurand met with Somervell. All Somervell could say was that someone had requested his services. That someone turned out to be Aurand's old classmate, Eisenhower, who now commanded SHAEF. On arrival in Paris, Eisenhower told Aurand about his problems with the supply of ammunition, and asked Aurand to investigate and report on it. Aurand would be assigned as the Assistant Chief Ordnance Officer in the ETO and Communications Zone (COMZ). The Chief Ordnance Officer was Major General Henry B. Sayler, another classmate, but junior in seniority to Aurand. Aurand assured Eisenhower that he had no objection to such an arrangement.

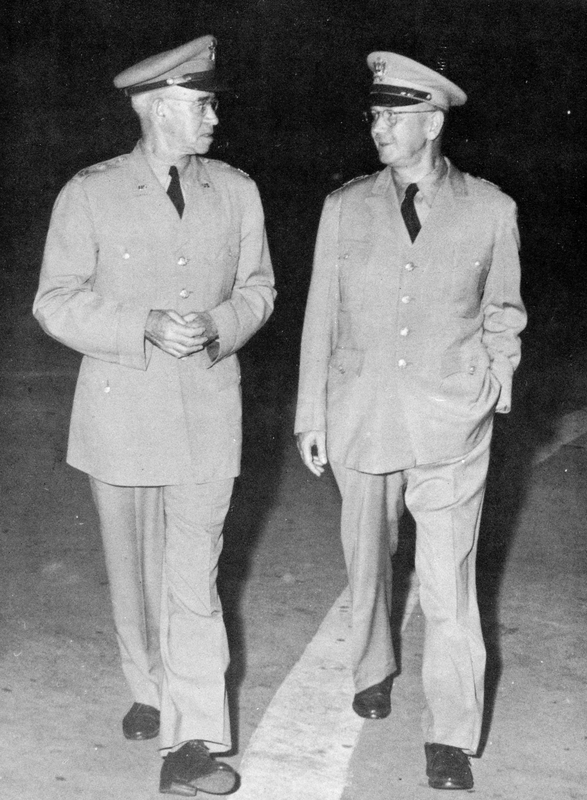
Aurand (right) with Omar Bradley in 1950

The causes of the ammunition crisis were many. The production of ammunition had been curtailed after excess stockpiles had been built up during the North African campaign, but expenditure in Europe, especially in heavy calibers, was greater than forecast, and ETO stocks were consistently below authorized levels. The increased demand for ammunition was due to the tactical situation, with the American armies attempting to break through the concrete and steel fortifications of the German Siegfried Line. Due to the failure to capture and develop adequate ports, unloading of ammunition had fallen behind schedule, and the rapid advances of July and August had led to the establishment of dumps and depots being neglected. Rationing had been imposed in June by the First Army when it was the senior American command on the continent, and this system had been carried over when the 12th Army Group had activated on August 1, 1944, under the command of Aurand's classmate Lieutenant General Omar Bradley, but its defects became apparent when Lieutenant General John C. H. Lee's COMZ had become active, as 12th Army Group was then neither the senior nor the sole command in ETO.

Aurand noted the deviations from the standard procedures. At Verdun, he spoke to the Chief Ordnance Officer of the 12th Army Group, Brigadier General Harold A. Nisley, who blamed the situation on Lee and the COMZ. He then saw the G-4 of the 12th Army Group, Brigadier General Raymond G. Moses, who detailed plans for upcoming operations, and explained that the theater reserves of ammunition were inadequate. But when Aurand asked about the stocks held by the armies, Moses told him that once ammunition was delivered to the armies by COMZ, it was no longer part of the theater reserves. Aurand soon located large stockpiles being held by the First Army. He then visited the Ninth Army headquarters at Maastricht, where he was warmly received by its commander, Lieutenant General William H. Simpson, whom he had known at the Army War College. Simpson reported that he had a good relationship with COMZ, and the Ninth Army staff were happy to divulge details of their ammunition holdings. At a dinner with Sayler, Major General Everett Hughes, Maxwell, who now the G-4 of the War Department General Staff, asked Aurand for his opinion of the command setup in ETO, and Aurand told him what he thought of the command arrangements in the ETO. Word got back to Eisenhower's Chief of Staff, Lieutenant General Walter B. Smith, who gave Aurand a severe dressing down, and told him that he would be reduced to his substantive rank of colonel and shipped home.

This did not occur; Aurand still had friends in high places. Maxwell told McCloy what had happened, and McCloy contacted Eisenhower. On December 7, Aurand's wife Betty wrote to inform him that he would not be sacked. Instead, Aurand assumed command of the Normandy Base Section on December 17, vice Major General Lucius D. Clay, who was returning to ASF in Washington, DC. He was also awarded the Bronze Star Medal. The Normandy Base Section had been the main point of entry for American supplies, but was now being superseded by the port of Antwerp. Aurand was soon confronted by two crises. On December 16, the Germans initiated the Ardennes offensive. The main effect on the Normandy Base Section was that it would be called upon to provide manpower as reinforcements for combat units, two engineer battalions to construct and man defences along the Meuse, and additional service units to activate Antwerp. Together, these demands would require about half of the Normandy Base Section's 150,000 personnel. Aurand replaced American soldiers with French civilians and German prisoners of war, and placed greater reliance on the rehabilitated railway network instead of the roads. The second crisis occurred on Christmas Eve; the troopship SS Léopoldville, carrying 2,235 men of the 66th Infantry Division, was torpedoed and sunk by the German submarine U-486, with the loss of 763 American lives. There was little that Aurand could do other than supervise rescue operations and tour the hospitals and the camp where survivors were collected.

A large proportion of the Normandy Base Section was made up of African American units, and shortly after Aurand assumed command of the Normandy Base Section, five were hanged for rape and murder. Over the following month, another seventeen were convicted and sentenced to death. Aurand asked Brigadier General Benjamin O. Davis, the Army's only African American general officer, for a report. The report produced sobering but not unexpected conclusions. Commanders of African American units complained that French civilians misrepresented, misreported and exaggerated charges of rape by African Americans. Aurand adopted and carried through Davis's recommendations for improving the living and working conditions and recreational facilities available to African Americans, and reports of serious crimes declined during 1945. May 4, 1945, was Aurand's last day as commanding general of the Normandy Base Section. Lee informed Aurand that the commander of the China Theater, Lieutenant General Albert C. Wedemeyer had requested his services. Lee expressed the hope that Aurand would stay—the Normandy Base Section was expected to become busy again as troops redeployed to the United States and the Pacific—but conceded that if their positions were reversed he would go. Aurand elected to go to China. Aurand was succeeded by his deputy, Brigadier General Jesse A. Ladd. For his services, Aurand was awarded an oak leaf cluster to his Distinguished Service Medal.

=== China Theater ===
Aurand became the Commanding General, Services of Supply (SOS), in the China Theater on May 25, 1945. The theater represented enormous logistics challenges. Much of the country was occupied by the Japanese, the logistical infrastructure of the hinterland still in Allied hands was undeveloped, and it lay at the end of a very long line of communications over the Himalayas, known as the "Hump". As in Europe, the organizational structures were not those found in the manuals. He found that there had been conflict between his predecessor, Major General Gilbert Cheves, and theater headquarters, which invariably had been resolved by the theater staff removing functions from the SOS. Given the size of the theater, Aurand felt he had no choice but to adopt a decentralized structure, with a base section around its headquarters at Kunming and broad authority delegated to the intermediate and advance section commanders.

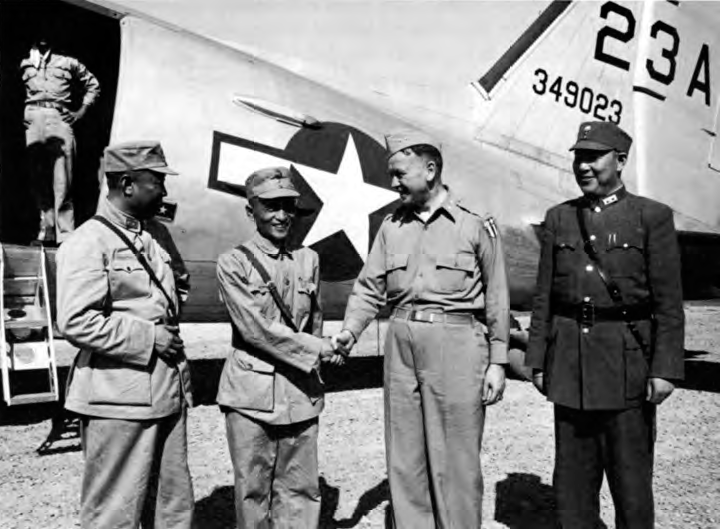
Aurand arrives at Chihchiang in June 1945 for an inspection tour, and is met by officials of the Chinese Services of Supply. From the left, General Pai Yun-shung, General Chang, General Aurand, and General Cheng.

Soon after he arrived, Aurand attempted to visit all the units under his command—no simple task. He found living conditions were primitive; tents were heavy and bulky, so instead of flying them over the Hump, the men lived with Chinese families or in their own version of the typical peasant's hut. American rations were scarce, so the men supplemented their diet with local purchases, resulting in a high rate of intestinal diseases, and Aurand was no exception. Aurand was especially disturbed at the ragged appearance of his soldiers. He resolved that by the first week of July everyone in the SOS in China would be eating American rations and have new clothes. The former was accomplished, but he was stymied on the latter due to global shortages. Even more dire was the ration situation of the Chinese soldiers that they were supporting, most of whom were suffering from nutritional deficiencies. A ration built around rice, beans and peanuts had been drawn up before Aurand arrived in the theater; it was his responsibility to see that it was delivered. Ultimately the SOS managed to supplement the diet of 185,000 Chinese soldiers.

At theater headquarters, planning was under way for Operation Carbonado, the capture of Fort Bayard, a port on the south coast of China, which would permit supplies to be brought in by sea. This was tentatively scheduled to commence on September 1, 1945. Aurand considered the whole plan a logistical nightmare; almost impossible to support in the manner required, and likely to fail if it was not. Moreover, if it did succeed, the operation of a port under the prevailing conditions would be extremely difficult. In the event, Operation Carbonado was pre-empted by the surrender of Japan on August 15. Aurand visited his soldiers with the message that they still had a job to do, and would not be going home soon; priority would be given to the combat troops. They did not welcome this, but appreciated their general coming to convey the news personally.

In the aftermath of the conflict the SOS had to support the Chinese armies moving into formerly occupied area, close the bases and depots, and dispose of equipment. Civil War erupted in parts of China. Two members of the Liquidation Commission came to see Aurand to protest his flouting of rules regarding the disposal of government property; the moment the war ended, all Lend-Lease material was to be paid for in full or returned to the United States. The Liquidation Commission seemed oblivious to the fact that a poor country at the end of eight years of war could not possibly pay for the supplies, which would cost more than their value to return to the United States. Aurand showed them the door. SOS was absorbed by theater headquarters in November 1945, and Aurand returned to the United States. For his service in China, he was awarded a second oak leaf cluster his distinguished service medal.

== Post-war ==
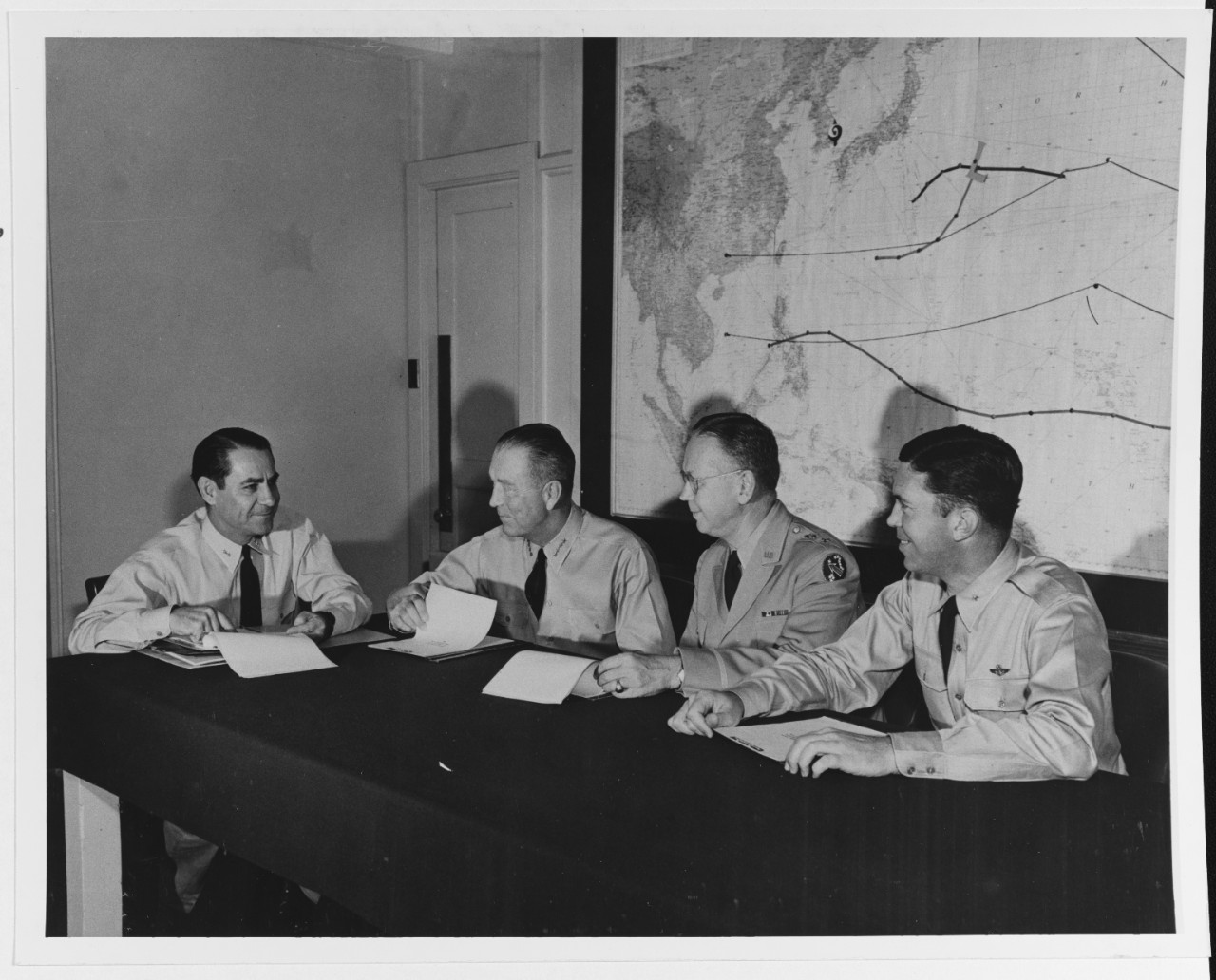
The Joint Advisory Board of the Pacific Command, meeting on August 27, 1949. Left to right: Rear Admiral John E. Gingrich, U.S. Navy; Admiral Arthur W. Radford, Commander in Chief, Pacific; Aurand; and Brigadier General Harold Q. Huglin, U.S. Air Force.

Soon after he reached the United States, Aurand went to see Eisenhower, who was now the Chief of Staff of the Army. Aurand had thought of retirement, but Eisenhower offered him his old post of commanding general of the Sixth Service Command, and he accepted. In February 1946, Lieutenant General LeRoy Lutes, who had succeeded Somervell as the Chief of Army Service Forces, asked him to perform another assignment. He had been impressed by the work Aurand has done closing down the SOS in the China Theater, and wanted him to do the same in the Africa-Middle East Theater. Long a backwater, it now consisted of about 3,100 troops. Aurand accepted this assignment, and it turned out to be far more enjoyable than China. The work was completed and his command ended on May 23, 1946. Lee, now the commander of the Mediterranean Theater of Operations, offered Aurand a position on his headquarters staff in Naples, and Lutes offered him command of the San Francisco Port of Embarkation. Aurand, still planning to retire, declined both offers, but when Eisenhower offered him the position of Director of Research and Development at the War Department, he accepted.

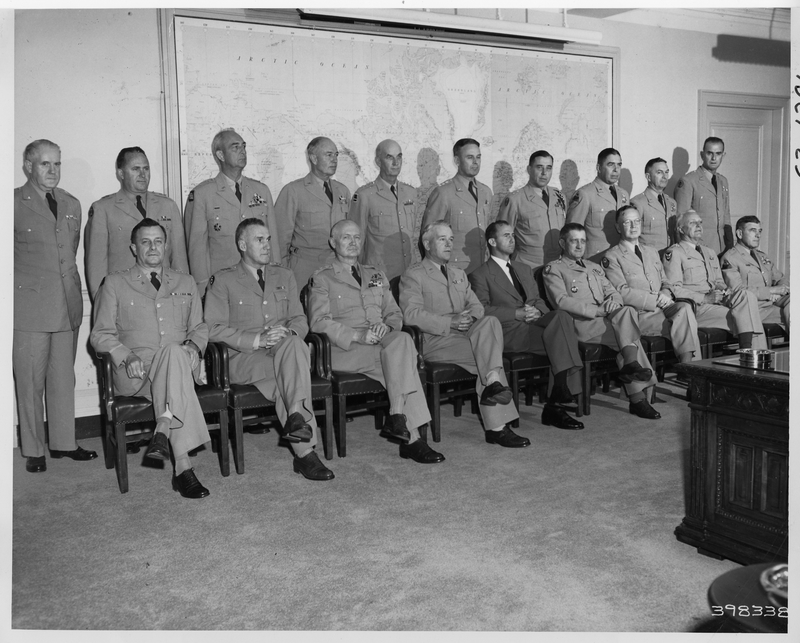
Army commanders in the United States and certain overseas commanders meet with Secretary of the Army Frank Pace and General J. Lawton Collins, Army Chief of Staff, in the Pentagon in routine sessions, June 5, 1952. Lieutenant General Henry Aurand is sat third from the right, between Lieutenant General John R. Hodge (left) and Lieutenant General Joseph M. Swing (right).

Soon after taking over, Aurand submitted a $600 million budget for Army Research and Development, but two thirds of money was for projects related to the Air Force, and with impending creation of an independent United States Air Force and United States Atomic Energy Commission in 1947, the future of the Army Research and Development was unclear. In September 1947, the Research and Development Division was abolished and its functions given to the Service, Supply, and Procurement Division, which soon after was renamed the Logistics Division. Aurand became the first commander of the Logistics Division, and was promoted to the rank of lieutenant general on January 22, 1948.

Aurand emphasized long-term projects rather than ones aimed at improving existing equipment. When Kenneth Royall, the new Secretary of the Army queried Aurand about progress on missiles, Aurand replied that six missiles were under development, and his preference was for their continued development, rather than the immediate deployment of a version of the German V-2 rocket with some minor improvements. This was prudent; any major re-equipment purchase would have quickly exhausted the available funds. Between 1948 and 1950, $5 billion was allocated for procurement, about a third of the Army's total budget of $14,8 billion. Most of the equipment had been purchased during World War II. Aurand had to report to Royall that the Army had 15,526 tanks, but only 1,762 were serviceable.

On March 21, 1949, Bradley, who had succeeded Eisenhower as Chief of Staff, appointed Aurand the Commanding General, United States Army, Pacific, a position he held until his retirement On August 31, 1952, when he was replaced by John W. O'Daniel. Aurand enjoyed Hawaii so much that he decided to buy a house and settle there. In 1960, Eisenhower, by then the president, appointed Aurand to the South Pacific Commission. He was also a columnist for The Honolulu Advertiser. Aurand left Hawaii in 1963, and moved to St Louis, Missouri. In 1977, he moved again, to Laguna Hills, California, where he died on June 18, 1980. His remains were buried in Arlington National Cemetery. His papers are in the Dwight D. Eisenhower Presidential Library.

== Military decorations ==
Distinguished Service Medal with two oak leaf clusters

Bronze Star

Mexican Service Medal

World War I Victory Medal

American Defense Service Medal

American Campaign Medal

Asiatic-Pacific Campaign Medal

European-African-Middle Eastern Campaign Medal

World War II Victory Medal

Légion d'honneur (Knight) (France)

Croix de guerre 1939–1945 (France)

Commander of the Order of the Bath (United Kingdom)

Grand Officer of the Order of the Liberator General San Martín (Argentina)

== Dates of rank ==
Insignia	Rank	Component	Date	Reference
No insignia in 1915	Second lieutenant	Coast Artillery Corps	June 12, 1915	
	First lieutenant	Coast Artillery Corps	July 1, 1916	
	Captain	Coast Artillery Corps	July 25, 1917	
	Major	National Army	January 14, 1918	
	Captain	Coast Artillery Corps	May 17, 1920	
	Major	Ordnance Department	July 1, 1920	
	Captain	Ordnance Department	November 4, 1922	
	Major	Ordnance Department	January 8, 1924	
	Lieutenant colonel	Ordnance Department	April 1, 1936	
	Colonel	Army of the United States	June 26, 1941	
	Brigadier general	Army of the United States	January 30, 1942	
	Major general	Army of the United States	September 8, 1942	
	Colonel	Ordnance Department	June 12, 1943	
	Brigadier general	Regular Army	June 26, 1946	
	Lieutenant general	Army of the United States	January 22, 1948	
	Major general	Regular Army	January 24, 1948	
	Lieutenant general	Regular Army	March 21, 1949	
	Lieutenant general	Retired List	August 31, 1952	

== Bibliography ==
- Ancell, R. Manning; Miller, Christine (1996). The Biographical Dictionary of World War II Generals and Flag Officers: The US Armed Forces. Westport, Connecticut: Greenwood Press. ISBN 0-313-29546-8. OCLC 33862161.
- Converse, Elliott Vanveltner (2012). Rearming for the Cold War, 1945–1960. History of acquisition in the Department of Defense. Washington, DC: Historical Office, Office of the Secretary of Defense. ISBN 978-0-16-091132-3. OCLC 793093436.
- Crosswell, D. K. R. (1991). The Chief of Staff: The Military Career of General Walter Bedell Smith. Westport, Connecticut: Greenwood Press. ISBN 978-0-313-27480-0. OCLC 22273487.
- Cullum, George W. (1920). Biographical Register of the Officers and Graduates of the US Military Academy at West Point New York Since Its Establishment in 1802: Supplement Volume VI 1910–1920. Chicago: R. R. Donnelly and Sons, The Lakeside Press.
- Cullum, George W. (1930). Biographical Register of the Officers and Graduates of the US Military Academy at West Point New York Since Its Establishment in 1802: Supplement Volume VII 1920–1930. Chicago: R. R. Donnelly and Sons, The Lakeside Press.
- Cullum, George W. (1940). Biographical Register of the Officers and Graduates of the US Military Academy at West Point New York Since Its Establishment in 1802: Supplement Volume VIII 1930–1940. Chicago: R. R. Donnelly and Sons, The Lakeside Press.
- Cullum, George W. (1950). Biographical Register of the Officers and Graduates of the US Military Academy at West Point New York Since Its Establishment in 1802: Supplement Volume IX 1940–1950. Chicago: R. R. Donnelly and Sons, The Lakeside Press.
- Millett, J. D. (1954). The Organisation and Role of the Army Service Forces (PDF). United States Army in World War II – The Army Service Forces. Washington, DC: Office of the Chief of Military History, Department of the Army. Archived from the original (PDF) on September 27, 2012.
- Morison, Samuel Eliot (1956). Volume X: The Atlantic Battle Won, May 1943 – May 1945. History of United States Naval Operations in World War II. Boston: Little, Brown and Co. OCLC 1010850740.
- Reese, John Russell (1984). Supply Man: The Army Life of Lieutenant General Henry S. Aurand, 1915–1952 (PhD thesis). Manhattan, Kansas: Kansas State University.
- Romanus, Charls F.; Sutherland, Riley (1959). Rime Runs Out in CBI (PDF). United States Army in World War II – The China-Burma-India Theater. Washington, DC: Center of Military History, Department of the Army. Archived from the original (PDF) on September 27, 2012.
- Ruppenthal, Roland G. (1959). Logistical Support of the Armies (PDF). United States Army in World War II – The European Theater of Operations. Vol. II, September 1944 – May 1945. Washington, DC: Center of Military History, United States Army. OCLC 8743709. Archived from the original (PDF) on September 27, 2012.
- Smith, R. Elberton (1959). The Army and Economic Mobilization (PDF). Washington, DC: Center of Military History, Department of the Army. Archived from the original (PDF) on September 27, 2012.
- Thomson, Harry C.; Mayo, Lida (1960). The Ordnance Department: Procurement and Supply (PDF). United States Army in World War II – The Technical Services. Washington, DC: Center of Military History, Department of the Army. Archived from the original (PDF) on September 27, 2012.
- Whisenhunt, Donald W. (2002). The Human Tradition in America Between the Wars, 1920–1945. Rowman & Littlefield. ISBN 978-0-8420-5012-8. OCLC 248628773.
