= Ronald L. Thompson =

American politician

Member of the Pennsylvania Legislature from the 15th district
- In office 1955–1966

Member of the Pennsylvania Legislature from the 12th district
- In office 1941–1942; 1949–1955

Personal details
- Born: August 19, 1899 Shamokin, Pennsylvania, U.S.
- Died: June 19, 1986 (aged 86) Clearwater, Florida, U.S.
- Party: Republican
- Spouse: Elsie Calvert (m. 1921)

Military service
- Branch/service: Army (WW1); Air Force (WW2)
- Battles/wars: World War I; World War II

Ronald L. Thompson (August 19, 1899 – June 19, 1986) was an American politician from Pennsylvania.

== Biography ==
Ronald L. Thompson was born in Shamokin, Pennsylvania on August 19, 1899. He served in the United States Army during World War I and in the United States Army Air Forces during World War II. While living in Mount Lebanon, Pennsylvania, Thompson, a Republican, served in the Pennsylvania House of Representatives from 1941 to 1942 and again from 1949 to 1966.

== Personal life ==
Thompson married Elsie Calvert in 1921, and they remained married until his death 65 years later. Elsie Thompson would later become well known in her own right, as the second-oldest living American for three months in early 2013. He died on June 19, 1986, in Clearwater, Florida, aged 86.
