= Kathryn Burak =

American novelist

- Born: June 11, 1959 (age 66) Shamokin, Pennsylvania, U.S.
- Occupation: Novelist
- Education: Kutztown University of Pennsylvania (BA); University of Massachusetts Amherst (MFA)
- Genre: Young adult fiction
- Spouse: Paul Makishima (m. 1987)
- Children: 2

Kathryn Burak (born June 11, 1959) is an American young adult novelist.

== Biography ==
She was born in Shamokin, Pennsylvania, the daughter of a coal miner and a seamstress. She received a BA in English from Kutztown University in Pennsylvania. and an MFA in poetry from the University of Massachusetts Amherst.

She is director of the Writing Program in the College of Communications at Boston University.

Her debut novel "Emily's Dress and Other Missing Things" (Roaring Brook Press ISBN 1596437367) is about a troubled young woman who moves to Amherst, Mass., after her mother's suicide, steals Emily Dickinson's dress from the poet's museum, and solves the mystery of her best friend's disappearance.

A starred Booklist review described the novel as "a complete portrait of loss, longing, redemption and love," and the Boston Globe called it a "lyrical and erudite tribute to Amherst's most famous resident."

The novel was nominated for an Edgar Award, named to the Independent Booksellers Association's New Voices list for 2012, and Southern Maine Library District's "Cream of the Crop" list of the best children's and young adult titles of 2012.

Burak's poetry and short stories have appeared in the Missouri Review, Fiction, Grey Sparrow, Western Humanities Review, Gettysburg Review West Branch, Yarrow, and Seventeen.

She is also co-author of the writing textbook Writing in the Works (Cengage Learning ISBN 1111834601)

She married Paul Makishima in 1987 and has two children.
