= Bud Weiser =

American baseball player (1891–1961)

- Outfielder
- Born: January 8, 1891; Shamokin, Pennsylvania, U.S.
- Died: July 31, 1961 (aged 70); Shamokin, Pennsylvania, U.S.
- Batted: Right Threw: Right

MLB debut
- April 29, 1915, for the Philadelphia Phillies

Last MLB appearance
- October 5, 1916, for the Philadelphia Phillies

MLB statistics
- Games played: 41
- Batting average: .162
- Runs batted in: 9
- Stats at Baseball Reference

Teams
- Philadelphia Phillies (1915–1916)

Harry Budson "Bud" Weiser (January 8, 1891 – July 31, 1961) was an American professional baseball outfielder. He played two seasons in Major League Baseball (MLB) for the Philadelphia Phillies. Weiser was 5 feet, 11 inches tall and weighed 165 pounds.

== Career ==
Weiser was born in Shamokin, Pennsylvania, in 1891. He started his professional baseball career in 1911 with the Carolina Association's Charlotte Hornets. That season, he had a batting average of .269 in 75 games. Weiser then batted .318 in 1912 and .241 in 1913. In 1914, while playing for the Hornets in the North Carolina State League, he raised his average to .333 and led the league in hits (148), slugging percentage (.560), and total bases (249). He was also the league's best all-around player, according to Sporting Life. That fall, he was signed by the National League's Philadelphia Phillies.

Weiser appeared in 37 games for the Phillies in 1915. He went 9 for 64 at the plate (.141) with 8 runs batted in. In 1916, he played four MLB games but spent most of the season with the Eastern League's New London Planters. Weiser did not get along with the Planters' manager and jumped the team at one point, but he was still the league's leading batter and base stealer as late as August. New London won the league championship.

In March 1917, Weiser was traded to the Southern Association's Little Rock Travelers. He batted .251 in 44 games for Little Rock, and that year he also played 87 games for the New York State League's Wilkes-Barre Barons and led the league with an average of .375.

Playing with a Steelton, Pennsylvania amateur team in 1918, Weiser went five for five at the plate, hitting for the cycle with two singles, one double, one triple and a home run. A newspaper article from the period also suggests his nickname (Bud Weiser) was due to the famous beer of the same name.

Weiser was sent to the International League's Reading Coal Barons in 1919. He batted .302 that season. In early 1920, however, he deserted the team to play in the Bethlehem Steel League. Weiser applied for reinstatement in 1921 but was denied. He eventually returned to organized baseball in 1923 and played in the New York–Pennsylvania League for the next three years. He finished his professional baseball career in 1928, when he batted .311 in the Middle Atlantic League.

Weiser died in Shamokin, Pennsylvania, in 1961 and was buried in Odd Fellows Cemetery.
