= Evan Peter Aurand =

United States Navy Vice Admiral

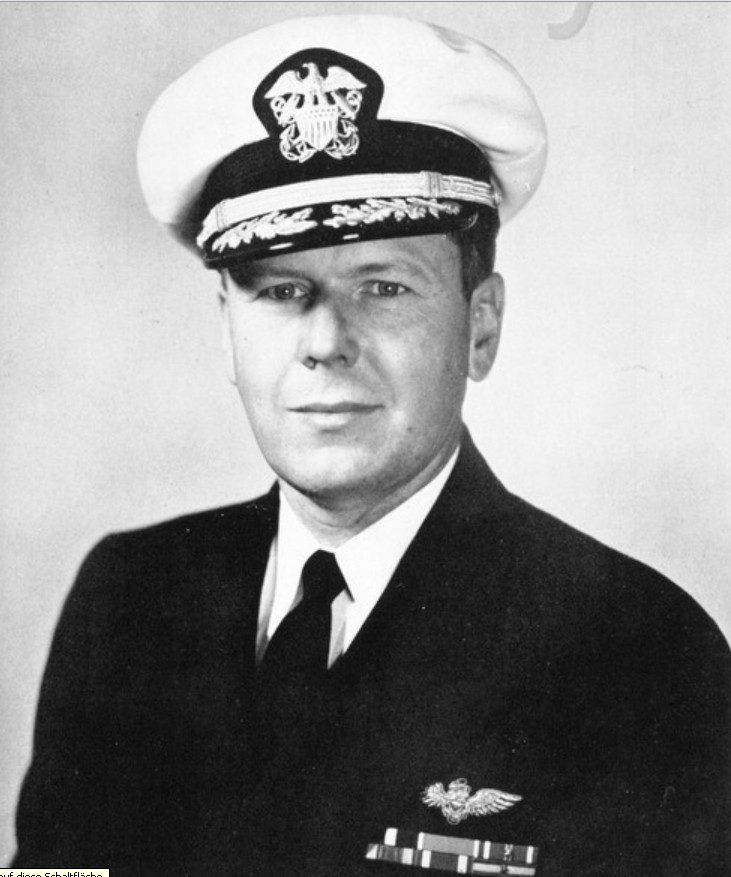
- Born: June 10, 1917; New York City, US
- Died: June 7, 1989 (aged 71); Honolulu, Hawaii, US
- Military career
- Allegiance: United States of America
- Branch: United States Navy
- Service years: 1938–1972
- Rank: Vice Admiral
- Nickname: "Pete"
- Commands: Antisubmarine Warfare Force Pacific; USS Independence; USS Greenwich Bay
- Conflicts: World War II; Cold War; Vietnam War
- Awards: Navy Cross; Navy Distinguished Service Medal; Legion of Merit (3)

Evan Peter Aurand (June 10, 1917 – June 7, 1989) was an American naval officer with the rank of Vice Admiral. He was a son of Lieutenant General Henry Aurand.

== Biography ==
Evan Peter Aurand was born in New York City on June 10, 1917. He was the son of Margaret Decker, a great-granddaughter of Texas leader Sam Houston, and U.S. Army Officer Henry S. Aurand. He attended East Orange High School, East Orange, New Jersey, before entering the U.S. Naval Academy from the Thirteenth Pennsylvania District on June 29, 1934. Graduated and commissioned Ensign on June 2, 1938, he subsequently advanced to the rank of Vice Admiral, to date from December 15, 1969.

Following graduation from the Naval Academy in June 1938, he was assigned to the USS Lexington, and served aboard that aircraft carrier until 1939, being transferred first to the USS Sturtevant, later to the USS McCormick. He had flight instruction at the Naval Air Stations, Pensacola and Miami, Florida, in 1940, and was designated naval aviator on January 1, 1941. He was then ordered to Scouting Squadron 2, based on the USS Lexington, and was serving with that squadron when the United States entered World War II in December 1941.

=== World War II ===
During World War II, Aurand served in combat service in the Pacific Theater, which earned him the Navy Cross, a Legion of Merit medal, a Navy Commendation Medal, the Air Medal, two Distinguished Flying Crosses and a Presidential Unit Citation aboard the USS Bunker Hill. He was part of Project Affirm, based at Quonset Point Naval Air Station. For his service, he was decorated with the Legion of Merit and another Navy Commendation Medal.

=== Military career ===
Evan Peter Aurand was born in New York, New York, on June 10, 1917. He attended East Orange High School, East Orange, New Jersey, before entering the U.S. Naval Academy from the Thirteenth Pennsylvania District on June 29, 1934. Graduated and commissioned Ensign on June 2, 1938, he subsequently advanced to the rank of Vice Admiral, to date from December 15, 1969.

Following graduation from the Naval Academy in June 1938, he was assigned to the USS Lexington, and served aboard that aircraft carrier until 1939, being transferred first to the USS Sturtevant, later to the USS McCormick. He had flight instruction at the Naval Air Stations, Pensacola and Miami, Florida, in 1940, and was designated naval aviator on January 1, 1941. He was then ordered to Scouting Squadron 2, based on the USS Lexington, and was serving with that squadron when the United States entered World War II in December 1941.

He participated in the Bougainville engagement on February 10, 1942, and the carrier attacks on Lae and Salamaua on the coast of New Guinea on March 10, 1942. He was awarded the Navy Cross “For distinguished service in the line of his profession as a pilot of a scouting Squadron when on March 10, 1942, in enemy waters, he pressed home in the face of heavy antiaircraft fire, a vigorous and determined dive bombing attack on enemy ships, sinking of them….”

Later in 1942 he was transferred to Escort Scouting Squadron 28, based in the USS Chenango, carrier escort. During the early part of 1943 he served in Project Affirm, Night Fighter Development Unit. While in that assignment he flew the first successful simulated interception in a single-seat Navy night fighter. He received a Legion of Merit for his services in the development of night fighter tactics and equipment.

He next commanded Night Fighting Squadron 76, the first Hellcat night fighter squadron, which took off Quonset Point, Rhode Island, on January 2, 1944, flew across country, embarked at Alameda, California, and was fighting in the Marshall Islands on January 26, 1944. This 12-plane squadron participated in all the fast carrier strikes from that date until October 1944, shooting down 36 planes, three of them at night. For “extraordinary achievement” in that command, he was awarded the Distinguished Flying Cross, a Gold Star lieu of a second similar award, and the Air Medal, and is entitled to the Ribbon for the Presidential Unit Citation awarded the USS Bunker Hill.

From November 1947 to May 1949, he successively commanded Fighter Squadrons 1A and 51, the first jet Squadron on the Pacific Fleet, and for a year thereafter served on the staff of Commander Aircraft, pacific Fleet. He reported to the Bureau of Aeronautics in September 1950, and served as Assistant Head of the Fighter Design until July 1952.

After a year at the Air Wing College at Maxwell Air Force Base, Alabama, he was assigned to the Staff of Commander Operations Development Force in Norfolk and served there from August 1953 to February 1955. He then served as Operations and Executive officer of the USS Hancock (CVA-19) until April 1956.

He was next ordered to the Navy Department, Washington, reporting in June 1956, and was subsequently assigned as Naval Aide to the Assistant Secretary of the Navy (Personnel and Reserve Forces). He served as Naval Aide to the President of the United States from February 1957 to January 1961, and was awarded a Gold Star in lieu of the Second Legion of Merit. He was cited in part as follows: “…. Exercising sound judgment, personal diplomacy, and a high degree of professional competence, Captain Aurand has been markedly successful in rendering outstanding staff assistance to the President….”

In February 1961 he assumed command of the USS Greenwich Bay (AVP-41) and in September of that year was transferred to command of the USS Independence (CVA-62). During the period September to December 1962, he was a student at Harvard University, Cambridge, after which he headed the Air Weapons Systems Analysis Staff. Assigned next to the office of the Director of Navy Program Planning, he served there until March 1965, then reported as Commander Anti-Submarine Warfare Group One. “For exceptionally meritorious service as Commander Anti-Submarine Warfare Task Group of the Seventh Fleet from September 23, 1965 to February 17, 1966…” he was awarded a Gold Star in lieu of the Third of Legion of Merit.

In April 1967 he reported as Director of the Long-Range Objectives Group, Office of the Chief of Naval Operations, Navy Department and in December 1969 became Commander Antisubmarine Warfare Force, U.S. Pacific Fleet. He was awarded the Distinguished Service Medal and cited in part as follows:

“…Vice Admiral Aurand was responsible for the conduct of overall ASW operations and of naval reconnaissance and surveillance in the Pacific Fleet; and was instrumental in improving the ASW capabilities of the Fleet by the establishment of a fleet-wide command and control organization capable of quick reaction to any ASW threat in the Pacific…”

In addition to the Navy Cross, the Distinguished Service Medal, the Legion of Merit with two Gold Stars, the Distinguished Flying Cross with Gold Star, the Air Medal. The Navy Commendation Medal, and the Ribbon for the Presidential Unit Citation to the USS Bunker, Vice Admiral Aurand has the American Defense Service Medal; Asiatic-Pacific Campaign Medal with six battle stars: American Campaign Medal; World War II Victory Medal; the National Defense Service Medal with bronze star; and the Vietnam Service Medal. He also has the National Order if Vietnam, Fifth Class and the Gallantry Cross with Palm from the Republic of Vietnam.

=== Personal ===
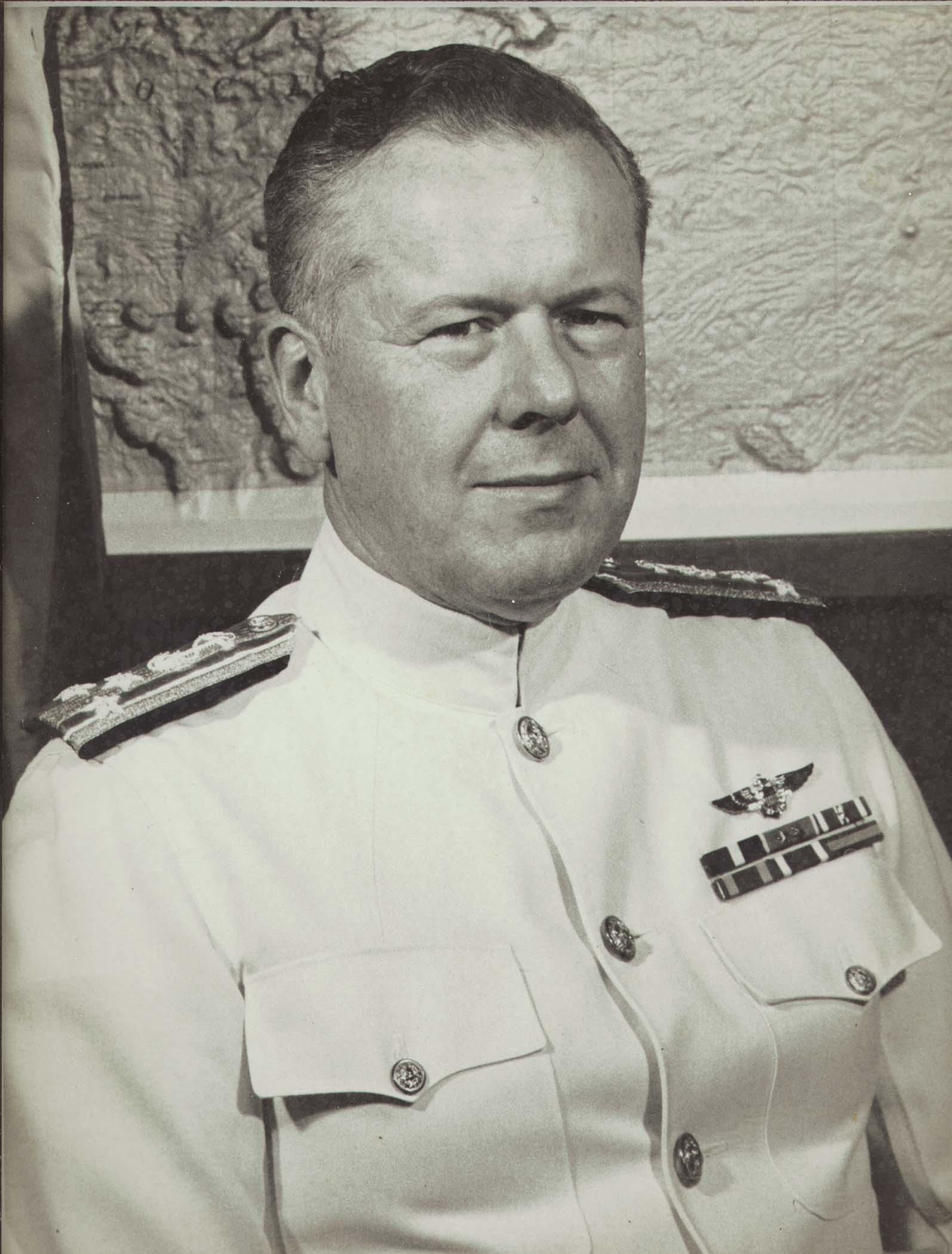
Aurand in 1971

He was preceded in death by his wife of 47 years, Patricia Riley of Mercer Island, Washington and three sons. He is survived by a daughter, Margaret L. H. Aurand, Esq. and two grandsons.

== Decorations ==

Naval Aviator Badge
| 1st Row | Navy Cross | Navy Distinguished Service Medal | Legion of Merit with two Gold Stars | Distinguished Flying Cross with Gold Star |
| 2nd Row | Air Medal | Navy and Marine Corps Commendation Medal | Navy Presidential Unit Citation with one citation star | American Defense Service Medal |
| 3rd Row | American Campaign Medal | Asiatic-Pacific Campaign Medal with three Service Stars | World War II Victory Medal | National Defense Service Medal with Service Star |

== Sources ==
Professional information taken from U.S. Navy records in possession of the subject.
