= Saint-Édouard =

Saint-Édouard may refer to:

- The French name for Saint Edward
- Saint-Édouard, Quebec, a parish in Montérégie, Quebec, Canada
- Saint-Édouard-de-Fabre, Quebec, a parish in Abitibi-Témiscamingue, Quebec, Canada
- Saint-Édouard-de-Lotbinière, Quebec, a parish in Chaudière-Appalaches, Quebec, Canada
- Saint-Édouard-de-Maskinongé, Quebec, a municipality in Mauricie, Quebec, Canada
- St. Edouard, Alberta, a hamlet in the County of St. Paul No. 19, Alberta, Canada

== See also ==
- Saint Edward (disambiguation)
