= Shamokin, Pennsylvania =

City in Pennsylvania, United States

- City
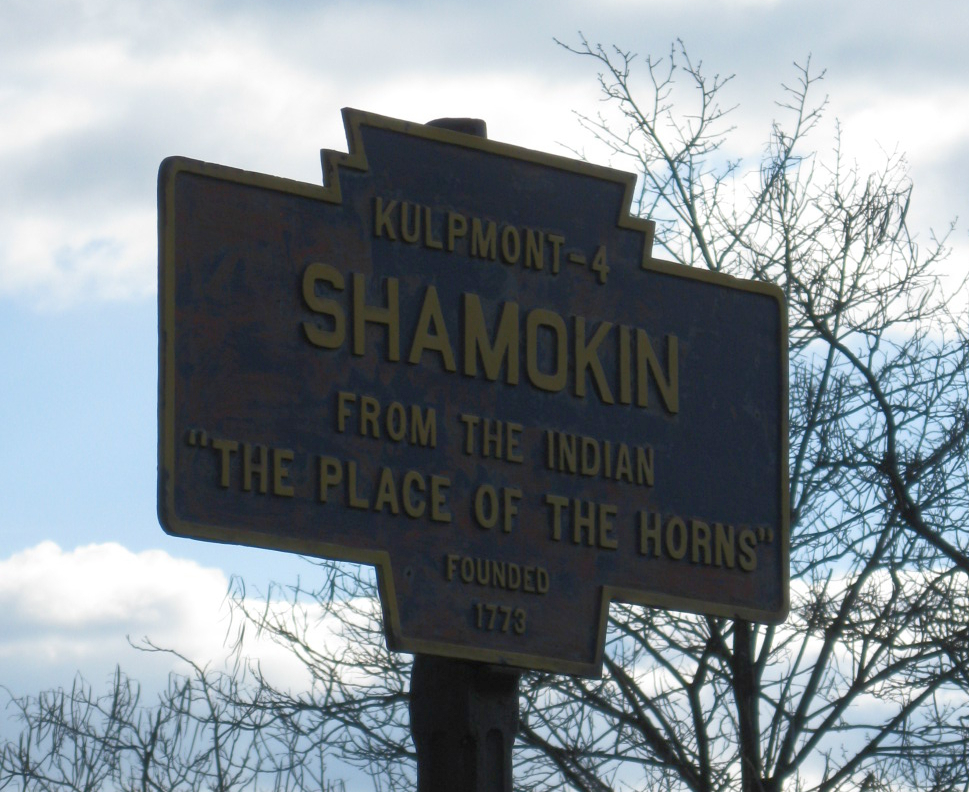
- Keystone Marker

- Flag

- Location of Shamokin and adjacent Coal Township in Northumberland County, Pennsylvania (left) and of Northumberland County in Pennsylvania (right)

- Location of Shamokin in Pennsylvania Shamokin (the United States)
- Coordinates: 40°47′21″N 76°33′17″W
- Country: United States
- State: Pennsylvania
- County: Northumberland
- Settled: 1835
- Incorporated (borough): 1864
- Incorporated (city): 1949

Government
  - Type: City
  - Mayor: Richard Ulrich (R)

Area
  - Total: 0.83 sq mi (2.16 km^{2})
  - Land: 0.83 sq mi (2.16 km^{2})
  - Water: 0 sq mi (0.00 km^{2})
- Elevation (benchmark in center of city): 741 ft (226 m)
- Highest elevation (northern boundary on Big Mountain): 1,080 ft (330 m)
- Lowest elevation (Shamokin Creek): 710 ft (220 m)

Population (2020)
  - Total: 6,942
  - Density: 8,414.5/sq mi (3,248.9/km^{2})
- Time zone: UTC-5 (Eastern Standard Time (EST))
  - Summer (DST): UTC-4 (EDT)
- ZIP Code: 17872
- Area codes: 570 and 272
- FIPS code: 42-69600
- Website: http://www.shamokincity.org/

Shamokin (/ʃəˈmoʊkɪn/; Saponi Algonquian Schahamokink, meaning "place of eels") (Lenape Indian language: Shahëmokink) is a city in Northumberland County, Pennsylvania, United States. Surrounded by Coal Township at the western edge of the Anthracite Coal Region in central Pennsylvania's Susquehanna River Valley, the city was named after a Saponi Indian village, Schahamokink. At the 2020 United States census, the population was 6,942.

== History ==
The first humans to settle Shamokin were probably Shawnee migrants.

=== 18th century ===
A large population of Lenape Indians (also known as Delaware Indians) resettled there in the early 18th century after the Walking Purchase along the eastern border of the colonial Province of Pennsylvania in the upper northern reaches of the Delaware River in 1737. Canasatego of the Six Nations, enforcing the Walking Purchase on behalf of Deputy Governor of Pennsylvania George Thomas, ordered the Lenape to two places on the Susquehanna River. Moravian missionaries were also early visitors to and settlers at Shamokin.

=== 19th century ===
Shamokin was founded in 1835 by the coal speculators John C. Boyd and Ziba Bird; it was known as Boyd's Stone-coal Quarry, Boydtown, and New Town. The discovery in the region of anthracite coal resources, or hard coal, became the basis of much industry. By 1840, the Shamokin Coal Company was advertised with capital of $300,000. The first recorded coal miners' strike in this region happened in 1842 and became progressively more common afterwards, as company owners called in cavalry units to arrest miners and evict them from their company-owned homes.

Incorporated as a borough under the Commonwealth constitution on November 9, 1864, Shamokin became an industrial center in the 19th century, with silk and knitting mills, stocking and shirt factories, wagon shops, ironworks, and brickyards in addition to anthracite coal-mining. The dominant Eagle Silk Mill became the largest textile manufacturing building under one roof in the United States.

Railroad companies such as Reading Railroad and the Baltimore & Ohio Railroad (B&O) bought interests in coal and became major employers in the area, building railroads to ship coal to markets and controlling most jobs. They created profits for their owners by consistently lowering workers' wagers and firing employees, creating widespread poverty and starvation in the town. Workers gradually organized into unions to develop means of bargaining with these powerful companies.

In the 1877 Shamokin uprising, railroad workers and miners angered by unexpected cuts in wages begun by the Baltimore and Ohio Railroad (B&O) joined what developed across the East into the Great Railroad Strike of 1877, which began with strikes in neighboring Martinsburg, West Virginia, then others in Maryland, including the headquarters of the B&O at its Camden Street Station in Downtown Baltimore. It then spread north and west into Pennsylvania and to Pittsburgh and other sites in several major industrial cities in Pennsylvania, as well as more cities in the Northeast and as far west as St. Louis and Missouri. Over a thousand people participated in the demonstrations in Shamokin, and government- and company-led militias shot and killed over 100 demonstrators. Five strikers were convicted of rioting and jailed for up to eight months for their part in the actions. Twenty Irish Catholics were also executed as suspected members of the Molly Maguires despite lack of strong evidence.

Inventor, scientist and entrepreneur Thomas A. Edison, briefly a resident of nearby Sunbury, established the Edison Illuminating Company of Shamokin in 1882. When the Shamokin power generating station on Independence Street started on September 22, 1883, St. Edward's Roman Catholic Church, which was connected, became the world's first church lit by electricity. Until 2017, Jones Hardware Company was at the Independence Street site of the former Edison electrical station.

=== 20th-21st century ===
In 1905, resident William A. Conway wrote Murder at Hickory Ridge, a dime novel, hoping to cash in on their popularity. It was a fictionalized account of an unsolved murder in the Shamokin area. His two brothers, Alphonsus E. and John J., printed the book on a press in their garage. They continued their business, starting the Conway Print Shop. With the profits from the novel, the Conways started the Black Diamond Publishing Company in 1905 and founded Black Diamond Magazine to disseminate news of the anthracite coal region. They developed a way to print a roll of tickets, planning to market them to the movie theaters being built in the area. To meet a request by the nearby Hazleton Baseball Club, they partnered with merchant Nicholas R. Ludes to make a big purchase of colored paper.

Together the Conway brothers and Ludes founded what became the National Ticket Company in Shamokin in 1907. At one time it was the nation's largest ticket manufacturing company. Its first production facility was built in 1911 at the corner of Pearl and Webster Streets. A 1942 fire gutted the plant, although the brick shell still stands. The replacement building at Pearl Street and Ticket Avenue was completed in 1950 and has since served as company headquarters. The business is still owned by descendants of the Conway and Ludes families. In the 21st century National Ticket has developed international customers.

Shamokin was formally incorporated as a city on February 21, 1949.

Edgewood Park, also known as Indian Park, operated in Shamokin as an increasingly popular amusement park from 1905 through the late 1950s, featuring a roller coaster and other rides and entertainments, and attracting regional crowds. Its 97 acres (39 ha) included a large pond. Faced with different needs in the 1950s, the Shamokin area school district developed this property for new elementary and high schools.

The Victoria Theatre in town was listed on the National Register of Historic Places maintained by the U.S. Department of the Interior in 1985. It was demolished in 1999 and delisted in 2004.

== Geography ==
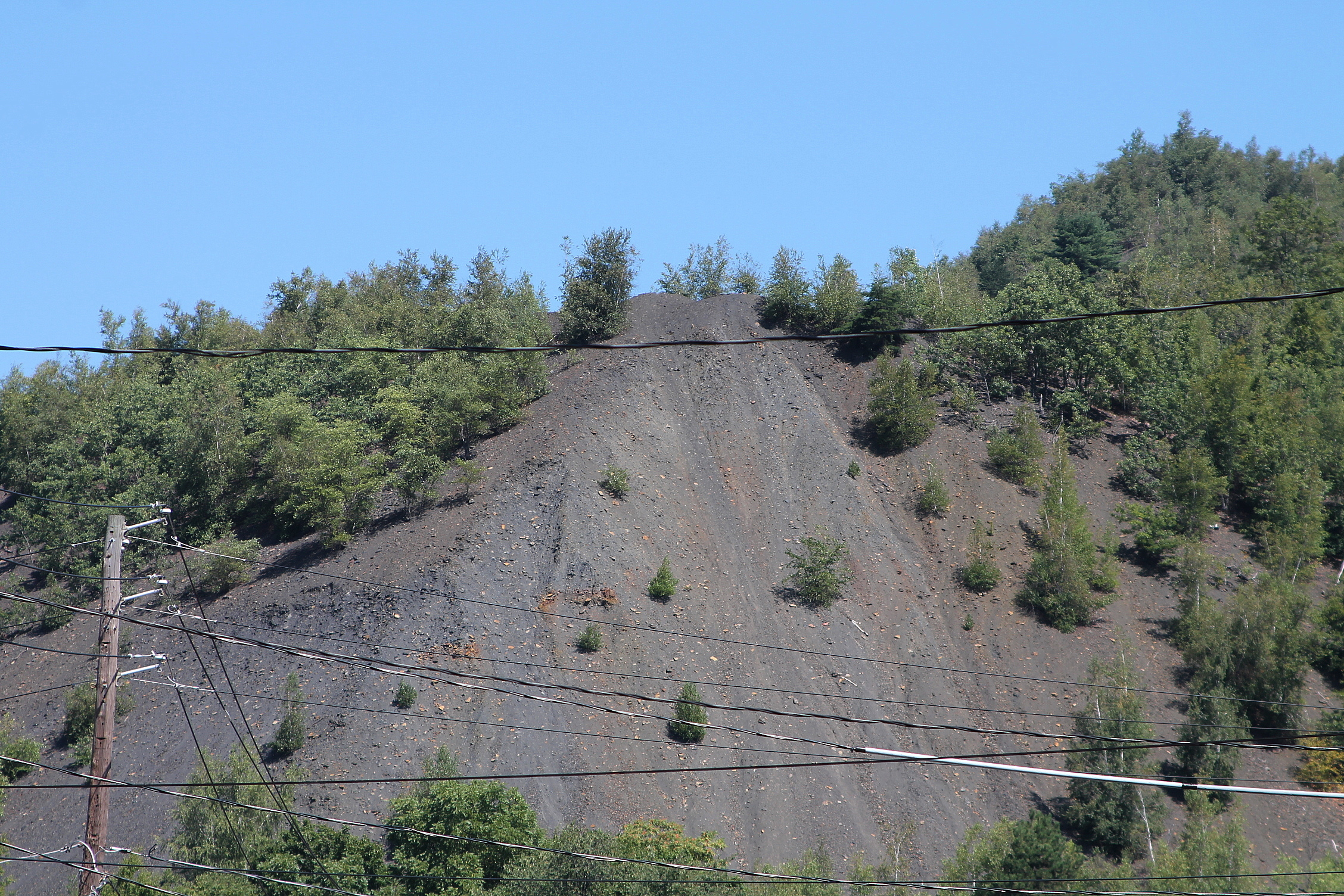
A coal pile near Shamokin

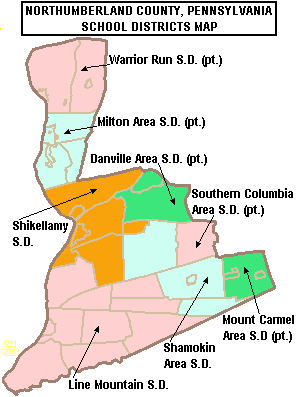
Map of Northumberland County, Pennsylvania public school districts

According to the U.S. Census Bureau, the city has an area of 0.8 square miles (2.1 km^{2}), all of which is land.

Shamokin has two small creeks that divide the town. Carbon Run merges with Shamokin Creek in the north of the town and empties into the Susquehanna River just south of Shamokin Dam near Sunbury.

The city has a warm-summer humid continental climate (Dfb) and average monthly temperatures range from 25.9 °F (−3.4 °C) in January to 71.1 °F (21.7 °C) in July. The hardiness zone is 6a.

It is also home to the world's largest man made culm bank, the Cameron/Glen Burn Colliery Culm Bank.

== Demographics ==
Historical population
Census	Pop.	Note	%±
1850	2,191		—
1860	2,159		−1.5%
1870	4,320		100.1%
1880	8,184		89.4%
1890	14,403		76.0%
1900	18,202		26.4%
1910	19,588		7.6%
1920	21,204		8.2%
1930	20,274		−4.4%
1940	18,810		−7.2%
1950	16,879		−10.3%
1960	13,674		−19.0%
1970	11,719		−14.3%
1980	10,357		−11.6%
1990	9,184		−11.3%
2000	8,009		−12.8%
2010	7,374		−7.9%
2020	6,942		−5.9%

=== 2020 census ===
As of the 2020 census, Shamokin had a population of 6,942. The median age was 38.5 years. 24.6% of residents were under the age of 18 and 17.4% of residents were 65 years of age or older. For every 100 females there were 92.2 males, and for every 100 females age 18 and over there were 88.5 males age 18 and over.

100.0% of residents lived in urban areas, while 0.0% lived in rural areas.

There were 3,032 households in Shamokin, of which 26.6% had children under the age of 18 living in them. Of all households, 27.9% were married-couple households, 24.2% were households with a male householder and no spouse or partner present, and 36.6% were households with a female householder and no spouse or partner present. About 39.4% of all households were made up of individuals and 17.9% had someone living alone who was 65 years of age or older.

There were 4,120 housing units, of which 26.4% were vacant. The homeowner vacancy rate was 3.8% and the rental vacancy rate was 15.2%.

Racial composition as of the 2020 census
Race	Number	Percent
White	5,977	86.1%
Black or African American	303	4.4%
American Indian and Alaska Native	14	0.2%
Asian	44	0.6%
Native Hawaiian and Other Pacific Islander	0	0.0%
Some other race	174	2.5%
Two or more races	430	6.2%
Hispanic or Latino (of any race)	469	6.8%

=== 2000 census ===
As of the 2000 census, there were 8,009 people, 3,742 households, and 2,028 families residing in the city. The population density was 9,601.9 inhabitants per square mile (3,707.3/km^{2}). There were 4,674 housing units at an average density of 5,603.6 per square mile (2,163.6/km^{2}). The racial makeup of the city was 98.8% White, 0.1% African American, 0.1% Native American, 0.3% Asian, 0.0% Pacific Islander, 0.1% from other races, and 0.5% from two or more races. Hispanic or Latino people of any race were 0.6% of the population.

There were 3,742 households, out of which 24.0% had children under the age of 18 living with them, 36.4% were married couples living together, 13.0% had a female householder with no husband present, and 45.8% were non-families. 41.2% of all households were made up of individuals, and 22.6% had someone living alone who was 65 years of age or older. The average household size was 2.13 and the average family size was 2.89.

In the city, the population had 22.2% under the age of 18, 7.2% from 18 to 24, 26.2% from 25 to 44, 22.6% from 45 to 64, and 21.9% who were 65 years of age or older. The median age was 41 years. For every 100 females, there were 86.2 males. For every 100 females age 18 and over, there were 80.6 males.

The median income for a household in the city was $20,173, and the median income for a family was $30,038. Males had a median income of $28,261 versus $19,120 for females. The per capita income was $12,354. About 19.3% of families and 60.2% of the population were below the poverty line, including 34.2% of those under age 18 and 21.3% of those age 65 or over.

== Education ==
Shamokin is part of the Shamokin Area School District, which includes Shamokin Area High School, along with an elementary, intermediate, and middle school. Local private schools include Our Lady of Lourdes Regional School and Meadowview Christian Academy. Luzerne County Community College (LCCC) has a satellite campus in the Careerlink Building on Arch Street.

== In popular culture ==
- The town is referenced in a sequence from the 1930 musical revue film King of Jazz.
- The 2020 drama film Never Rarely Sometimes Always was filmed in Shamokin.
- Featured in the song "We Did the Samba in Shamokin" (1958), conducted by Henry Mancini. The song was sampled as bumper music for Bob and Ray's radio show on WOR (AM) in the mid-1970s.

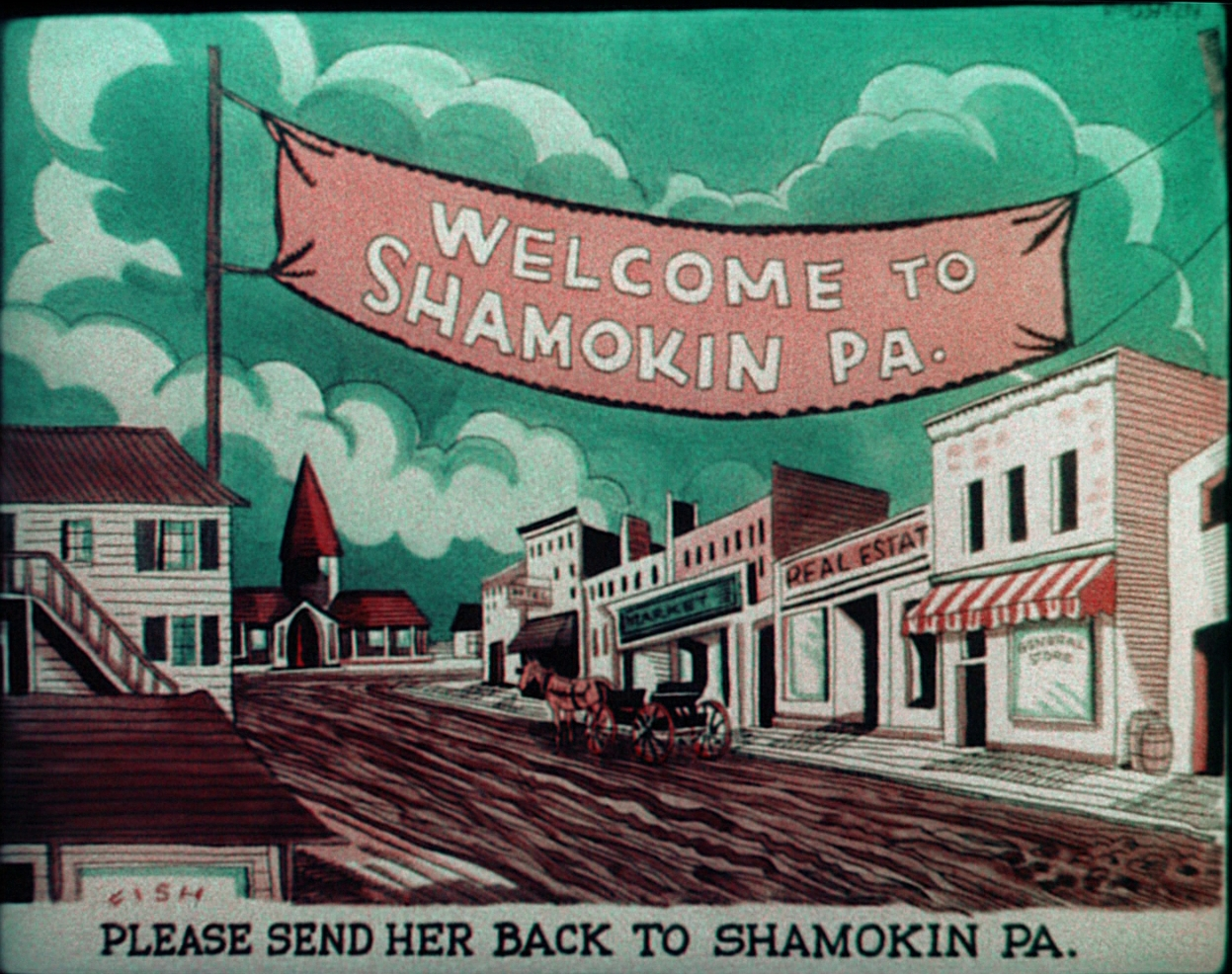
Image of the town from King of Jazz (1930)

- Holy Trinity Episcopal Church in Shamokin was the site of a reputed apparition of a Eucharistic miracle beginning in 1977; large numbers of visitors came to the town, and the event received significant national attention.

== Notable people ==
- Kathryn Burak, novelist
- Harry Coveleski (1886–1950), former professional baseball player, Cincinnati Reds, Detroit Tigers, and Philadelphia Phillies
- Stan Coveleski (1889–1984), former professional baseball player, Cleveland Indians, New York Yankees, Philadelphia Athletics, and Washington Senators
- George H. Cram (1838–1872), Union Army colonel in the American Civil War and brevet general in the post-war Reconstruction era
- Jake Daubert, former professional baseball player, Brooklyn Dodgers and Cincinnati Reds
- Charles K. Eagle (d. 1928), silk merchant
- John Grazier (1946–2022), American realist painter
- Herbert G. Hopwood (1898–1966), United States Navy, four star admiral and commander-in-chief of the U.S. Pacific Fleet
- Eddie Korbich, Broadway, film and television actor
- Mary LeSawyer, operatic soprano
- Harry J. Lincoln, early 1900s popular music composer
- Michael Luchkovich, first ethnic Ukrainian member of the House of Commons of Canada
- Fred Rhoads, cartoonist of Sad Sack
- Holden C. Richardson, pioneer in U.S. naval aviation
- Ronald L. Thompson, Pennsylvania state legislator
- Thomas I. Vanaskie, federal judge on the United States Court of Appeals for the Third Circuit
- Bud Weiser, Major League Baseball player
- William Wood (c. 1861–1908), illusionist and ventriloquist
- Joseph Zupicich (1893–1987), crewmember of the steamship RMS Carpathia, which assisted in the rescue operation for the RMS Titanic
