= St. Edward Church (Little Rock, Arkansas) =

Historic church in Arkansas, United States

- U.S. National Register of Historic Places
- U.S. Historic district – Contributing property
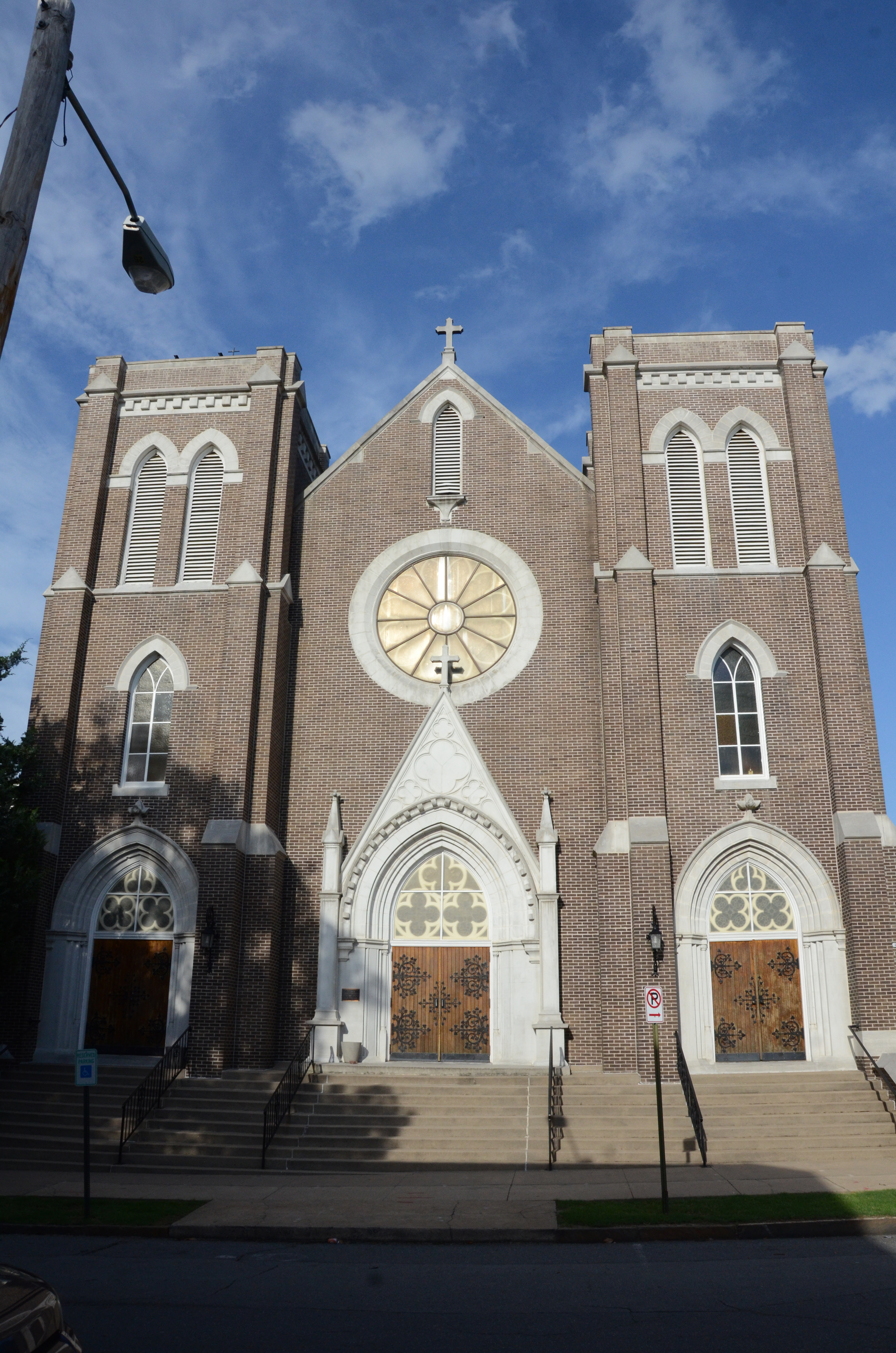

- Location within Arkansas Location within the United States
- Location: 801 Sherman St., Little Rock, Arkansas
- Coordinates: 34°44′23″N 92°15′54″W
- Area: less than one acre
- Built: 1901
- Architect: Charles L. Thompson
- Architectural style: Late Gothic Revival
- Part of: MacArthur Park Historic District (ID77000269)
- MPS: Thompson, Charles L., Design Collection TR
- NRHP reference No.: 82000929

Significant dates
- Added to NRHP: December 22, 1982
- Designated CP: July 25, 1977

St. Edward Church is a historic Roman Catholic church at 801 Sherman Street in Little Rock, Arkansas, United States. Built in 1901, it is a handsome Gothic Revival structure, built out of brick with stone trim. A pair of buttressed towers flank a central gabled section, with entrance in each of the three parts set in Gothic-arched openings. A large rose window stands above the center entrance below the gable, where there is a narrow Gothic-arched louver. Designed by Charles L. Thompson, it is the most academically formal example of the Gothic Revival in his portfolio of work.

The building was listed on the National Register of Historic Places in 1982.

== See also ==
- National Register of Historic Places listings in Little Rock, Arkansas
