= St. Edward's Catholic Church =

Parish church in Pennsylvania, U.S.

Coordinates: 40.7895°N 76.5516°W

- Mother Cabrini Catholic Church
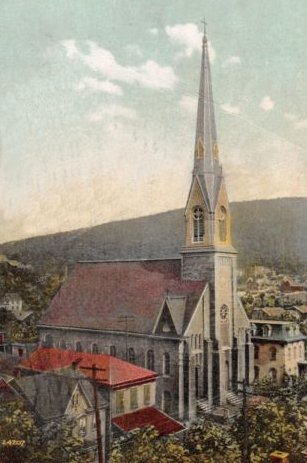
- St. Edward's Catholic Church
- Location: 214 North Shamokin Street, Shamokin, Pennsylvania, United States
- Denomination: Catholic
- Website: www.mothercabrini.net

History
- Founder: Rev. J. J. Koch

Architecture
- Groundbreaking: September 1872
- Completed: 1879

Administration
- Archdiocese: Diocese of Harrisburg

Clergy
- Pastor: Very Rev. Martin Kobos

St. Edward's Catholic Church, located in Shamokin, Pennsylvania, was constructed in the late nineteenth century. Its congregation grew out of earlier Shamokin churches and served the men that worked on the Danville and Pottsville Railroad. With Edward the Confessor as its patron saint, the first St. Edward's Catholic Church was built and then dedicated in 1840. In August 1866, a parish was established and its first pastor was appointed in September of that year. A larger church was completed by Thanksgiving 1866.

Groundbreaking and construction of a third church began in 1872. The larger church, built out of local sandstone, was adorned with interior life-size paintings and frescoes. The church, which then served up to 1,400 people, was dedicated on June 6, 1880. It is within the Diocese of Harrisburg. St. Edward's was claimed by locals to be the first church in the world to use electric lighting. The electric current was provided by the Edison Illuminating Company of Shamokin and the light bulbs were installed under the supervision of Thomas Edison.

The church operated a parochial school beginning in 1874. Run by the Sisters of Charity from Mount St. Vincent, New York beginning in 1875, it had 700 students and 14 teachers from the Sisters of Charity by 1911. The church was rededicated in 1969 following several 20th-century remodeling efforts that included the installation of stained glass windows, Carrara marble, and Stations of the Cross. The church was destroyed by a fire in 1971 and rebuilt over the next few years with parishioners having mass in the church’s school gym. St. Edward’s was part of a consolidation of churches in 1995 and renamed as Mother Cabrini Catholic Church.

== Early church history ==
A need for a Catholic church began with Danville and Pottsville Railroad workers, many of whom were of the Catholic faith, who were brought in to build a railroad in the area. Starting in 1838 church services were held in the village of Shamokin, led by preachers from Pottsville and Minersville, Pennsylvania. A half acre of land was purchased on the west end of the village, where a wooden structure 20 feet by 32 feet was built by Stephen Bittenbender, Patrick Reilly, and Matthew Brannigan. Bishop Francis Kenrick of Philadelphia dedicated this as St Edward's Church on October 11, 1840. Reverend Michael Sheridan, pastor of St Joseph's Church in Danville, was in charge of the congregation from 1854 to October 1857. He was succeeded by Reverend Edward Murray who served as pastor until early summer of 1866.

A parish was established in Shamokin in August 1866, with Father J. J. Koch appointed as its first pastor in September 1866. Construction on a second, larger St. Edward's church building was completed by Thanksgiving 1866. The congregation soon outgrew the building and in 1867 the building was enlarged. A parochial house was built on an adjoining lot in the spring of 1869.

== Construction and electricity ==
Having planned for a new church for some time, Reverend Koch led the groundbreaking for a new church in September 1872. White cut sandstone from the Big Mountain area and other building stone from Edgewood Park (Shamokin Indian Park) was brought in on sleds during the winter of 1872–73. They were cut to size on site by a dozen laborers and the cornerstone was laid May 23, 1873. The roof was completed in 1873 or 1875. The first mass was held in the basement on Christmas and church services were held there until the entire building was completed.

The church tower was completed in 1875 and four years later the interior was finished. The church tower, with four large bells weighing 8,500 pounds, was 207 feet (63 m) high. An artist from Philadelphia created the interior frescoes. A depiction of the Resurrection of Christ, surrounded by the four Evangelists, was created in a 22 feet (6.7 m) fresco on the ceiling. Works of art included life-size paintings of St. Edward, the patron of the church, St. Patrick, and The Crucifixion and were hung over the main altar. The twelve Apostles were painted on the walls. Father Kock imported two statues from France that sat on either side of the altar. They represented Christ meeting His Mother on His Way to Calvary and the Descent from the Cross. The church, which initially served up to 1,400 people, is located at Shamokin Street and Webster Street near downtown Shamokin. The third St. Edward's Catholic Church, within the Diocese of Harrisburg, was dedicated on June 6, 1880.

An addition was built on the back of the building in 1882 to hold church records and vestments. The church received electric lights in 1883. Electric current to the church was supplied by the Edison Electric Illuminating Company of Shamokin. It was claimed by locals to be the first church in the world with electric lighting, although according to records of an Edison museum, St. Edward's was preceded in that regard by the City Temple church in London and a church, 1st Presbyterian, in Roselle, New Jersey.

The Roselle electrical system was wired with a 330 volt system. The St. Edward Church was the first to be wired with a 110 volt system, which was then adopted throughout the United States. The lights of this church were first turned on September 22, 1883. The complete electrical project was engineered and supervised by Thomas Edison. (Note: John Mullen, an investor in the Edison Electric Illuminating Company, was a member of St. Edward's Catholic Church. Mullen helped coordinate the installation of electricity in the church, with Thomas Edison arriving in Shamokin in the fall of 1882.)

== Parochial school ==
Father Koch (Note: Father Koch was the vicar general of the Diocese of Harrisburg for 23 years. He was appointed administrator of the dioceses in 1898.) organized a parochial school in 1874, which operated out of the 1866 church building. Initially, lay teachers taught the students. The Sisters of Charity from Mount St. Vincent, New York assumed supervision of the church in 1875, with four sisters placed at St. Edwards. A convent was built for them in 1877. A brick schoolhouse was completed in 1884 on a lot opposite the church. By 1911, there were more than 700 students who were taught by 14 Sisters of Charity.

== 20th-century remodeling ==
In 1906, the church interior was remodeled to include stained glass windows and decorations by the Italian artist Baraldi. Until 1932 the church steeple was the tallest structure in the area, but lowered then by 100 feet. The church basement was converted into a social hall and additional interior remodeling — including installation of Carrara marble for wainscoting, a communion railing, and altar — was completed in 1938.

An extensive remodeling project of 1968 and 1969 resulted in repairs to exterior stone walls and mortar joints and remodeling of the interior. Canterbury crosses were mounted at the Stations of the Cross. The modern English words from Matthew 11:28, Come to me, all you who are weary and burdened, and I will give you rest replaced the old Latin text spoken by Christ that was previously there. Other changes were the addition of symbols of the Trinity on the ceiling and other symbols put on the walls. A reproduction of Reubens' painting of the crucifixion of Jesus was added to the interior of the church. The church was rededicated in 1969.

== Fire of 1971 ==
The 99-year-old structure, which was then serving 2,500 church members, burned down in 1971. The fire, so fierce that it required 200 volunteer firemen to fight the fire and save nearby structures, took down the church so that all that remained were the stone walls. The church was rebuilt over the next three years. The interior of the new church was built inside the walls of the original structure, which were all that remained after the 1971 fire. There was a formal dedication of the newly constructed building in October 1974, officiated by The Most Rev. Joseph Thomas Daley, D.D., the Bishop of the Diocese of Harrisburg.

== Mother Cabrini Catholic Church ==
St. Edward's has historically had a congregation of German, Italian, and Irish members and priests who were Irish.

Due to declining church membership, the need to redraw parish boundaries, and a need to pool resources—five Catholic churches in the coal-mining region of Pennsylvania were consolidated in 1995 into the new Mother Cabrini parish. (Note: The churches included were Assumption BVM, St. Anthony of Padua, St. Edward the Confessor, St. Michael the Archangel and St. Stanislaus Kostka.) St. Edward's parish, which was central to the five churches, was renamed the Mother Cabrini parish for its patron saint, Frances Xavier Cabrini. As a result of the consolidation, the congregation became more diverse. It picked up members from the four Lithuanian, Polish, and Slovak churches. The Franciscan order that oversaw St. Stanislaus Church then oversaw the former St. Edward's, now Mother Cabrini, church building.

In recognition of the region's coal mining history, the church has a Coal Altar. It participates in the town's annual Anthracite Heritage Festival.

== Sources ==
- Best Books (1940). A Guide to the Keystone State. Best Books on. ISBN 978-1-62376-037-3. "first church in the world lighted by electricity"
- Encyclopedia Americana (1970). The Encyclopedia Americana international edition. "St. Edward's Roman Catholic Church, erected in 1873, is said to have been the first church in the world lighted by electricity."
- Fire Engineering (1971). Fire Engineering. Technical Publication. "St. Edward's Church has long been looked upon as a historic landmark by area residents. The structure was the first church in the world to be lighted by electricity and the wiring was installed under the personal direction of Thomas A. Edison."
- JEWO (1947). The Journal of Electrical Workers and Operators. The Brotherhood. "St. Edward's Roman Catholic Church in Shamokin, was the first building of its kind in the world to be illuminated by electric light."
- McDonnald, Alexander Hopkins (1951). The Encyclopedia Americana. Americana Corporation. "St. Edward's Roman Catholic Church, erected in 1873, is said to have been the first church in the world lighted by electricity."
- Whipporwill (1911). Genealogical and Biographical Annals. Whipporwill Publications - in public domain.
