= List of Maryland Terrapins football seasons =

The Maryland Terrapins football team represents the University of Maryland in the National Collegiate Athletic Association (NCAA) Division I Football Bowl Subdivision (FBS). In its 130 active years, the team has played in over a thousand games, including 28 post-season bowl game appearances. The Terrapins have been awarded 2 national championships, 11 conference champions, and 17 times received a final ranking in the Associated Press (AP) Poll. Maryland is the only Atlantic Coast Conference (ACC) team to have twice secured three consecutive outright conference championships. Many Maryland alumni have continued their playing careers in professional football, including Randy White, Boomer Esiason, Shawne Merriman, Dick Modzelewski, and Stan Jones.

The modern Maryland Terrapins football program traces its beginning to the team first formed by quarterback Will Skinner in 1892 at what was then known as the Maryland Agricultural College. Since then, the Terrapins (commonly known as the "Terps") have experienced their most success under head coaches Jim Tatum, Jerry Claiborne, Bobby Ross, and Ralph Friedgen.

Between 1947 and 1955, Jim Tatum led the Terps to two national championships, two ACC championships, a Southern Conference championship, and five bowl game appearances. In 1952, Maryland quarterback Jack Scarbath was the runner-up to the Heisman Trophy, which is awarded to college football's most outstanding player. The next year, coach Tatum led the team through an undefeated regular season. This resulted in Maryland being awarded the 1953 National Championship.

During Jerry Claiborne's tenure, from 1972 to 1981, the team captured three consecutive ACC championships and made seven bowl game appearances, the most of any Maryland coach to date. In Bobby Ross's five years at Maryland, from 1982 to 1986, he led the team to three consecutive ACC championships and four bowl appearances. In 1984, quarterback Frank Reich led the team to victory from a 31–0 halftime deficit against Miami in what was then the greatest comeback in NCAA football history. This period was marked by bitter competition for ACC primacy with 1981 national champions Clemson, and between 1974 and 1988, each team won six conference championships.

In 1986, when Maryland basketball star Len Bias suffered a drug overdose, it sent a ripple-effect through the athletic department. Bobby Ross said that he was offended by unfounded "innuendo, insinuation and guilt by association" aimed at the football team and resigned as head coach. In the following fourteen years, Maryland had two winning seasons and appeared in one bowl game.

In 2001, Ralph Friedgen took over a Maryland team that had one winning season in the past decade, and led them to an ACC championship and a Bowl Championship Series (BCS) game in his first season. In the following two years, Friedgen became the only ACC head coach to have led his team to win ten games in each of his first three seasons. In his ten-year tenure, Friedgen led the Terrapins to seven bowl appearances. In his last year, Maryland concluded the 2010 season with a 9–4 record, a win in the Military Bowl, and a top 25 national ranking.

== Seasons ==
| Year | Coach | Overall | Conference | Standing | Bowl/playoffs | Coaches^{#} | AP^{°} |
|---|---|---|---|---|---|---|---|
William W. Skinner (Independent) (1892)
| 1892 | William W. Skinner | 0–3 | | | | | |
Samuel Harding (Independent) (1893)
| 1893 | Samuel Harding | 6–0 | | | | | |
J. G. Bannon (Maryland Intercollegiate Football Association) (1894)
| 1894 | J. G. Bannon | 4–3 | 2–2 | | | | |
| 1895 | No team | | | | | | |
Grenville Lewis (Maryland Intercollegiate Football Association) (1896)
| 1896 | Grenville Lewis | 6–2–2 | 1–0–1 | | | | |
John Lillibridge (Maryland Intercollegiate Football Association) (1897)
| 1897 | John Lillibridge | 2–4 | 0–3 | | | | |
Frank Kenly (Independent) (1898)
| 1898 | Frank Kenly | 2–5–1 | | | | | |
S. S. Cooke (Independent) (1899)
| 1899 | S. S. Cooke | 1–4 | | | | | |
F. H. Peters (Independent) (1900)
| 1900 | F. H. Peters | 3–4–1 | | | | | |
Emmons Dunbar (Independent) (1901)
| 1901 | Emmons Dunbar | 1–7 | | | | | |
D. John Markey (Independent) (1902–1904)
| 1902 | D. John Markey | 3–5–2 | | | | | |
| 1903 | D. John Markey | 7–4 | | | | | |
| 1904 | D. John Markey | 2–4–2 | | | | | |
Fred K. Nielsen (Independent) (1905–1906)
| 1905 | Fred K. Nielsen | 6–4 | | | | | |
| 1906 | Fred K. Nielsen | 5–3 | | | | | |
Charles W. Melick (Independent) (1907)
| 1907 | Charles W. Melick | 3–6 | | | | | |
William Lang (Independent) (1908–1909)
| 1908 | William Lang | 3–8 | | | | | |
| 1909 | Lang & Larkin | 2–5 | | | | | |
Royal Alston (Independent) (1910)
| 1910 | Royal Alston | 4–3–1 | | | | | |
Charley Donnelly (Independent) (1911)
| 1911 | Charley Donnelly (Note: Charley Donnelly coached the Aggies in their first eight games, compiling a 2–4–2 record; Curley Byrd took over as coach for the final two games, both victories.) | 4–4–2 | | | | | |
Curley Byrd (Independent) (1911–1916)
| 1912 | Curley Byrd | 6–1–1 | | | | | |
| 1913 | Curley Byrd | 6–3 | | | | | |
| 1914 | Curley Byrd | 5–3 | | | | | |
| 1915 | Curley Byrd | 6–3 | | | | | |
| 1916 | Curley Byrd | 6–2 | | | | | |
Curley Byrd (South Atlantic Intercollegiate Athletic Association) (1917–1921)
| 1917 | Curley Byrd | 4–3–1 | 2–1–1 | T–4th | | | |
| 1918 | Curley Byrd | 4–1–1 | 2–0–1 | T–2nd | | | |
| 1919 | Curley Byrd | 5–4 | 4–1 | 2nd | | | |
| 1920 | Curley Byrd | 7–2 | 4–0 | 2nd | | | |
| 1921 | Curley Byrd | 3–5–1 | 2–2–1 | T–7th | | | |
Curley Byrd (South Atlantic Intercollegiate Athletic Association) (1922–1934)
| 1922 | Curley Byrd | 4–5–1 | 1–2 | T–11th | | | |
| 1923 | Curley Byrd | 7–2–1 | 2–1 | T–8th | | | |
| 1924 | Curley Byrd | 3–3–3 | 1–2–1 | 16th | | | |
| 1925 | Curley Byrd | 2–5–1 | 0–4 | T–20th | | | |
| 1926 | Curley Byrd | 5–4–1 | 1–3–1 | 17th | | | |
| 1927 | Curley Byrd | 4–7 | 3–5 | 15th | | | |
| 1928 | Curley Byrd | 6–3–1 | 2–3–1 | T–14th | | | |
| 1929 | Curley Byrd | 4–4–2 | 1–3–1 | 17th | | | |
| 1930 | Curley Byrd | 7–5 | 4–2 | T–6th | | | |
| 1931 | Curley Byrd | 8–1–1 | 4–1–1 | 5th | | | |
| 1932 | Curley Byrd | 5–6 | 2–4 | 16th | | | |
| 1933 | Curley Byrd | 3–7 | 1–4 | 9th | | | |
| 1934 | Curley Byrd | 7–3 | 3–1 | T–3rd | | | |
Jack Faber (Southern Conference) (1935)
| 1935 | Jack Faber | 7–2–2 | 3–1–1 | 3rd | | | |
Frank Dobson (Southern Conference) (1936–1939)
| 1936 | Frank Dobson | 6–5 | 4–2 | 5th | | | |
| 1937 | Frank Dobson | 8–2 | 3–0 | 1st | | | |
| 1938 | Frank Dobson | 2–7 | 1–2 | 12th | | | |
| 1939 | Frank Dobson | 2–7 | 0–1 | 14th | | | |
Jack Faber (Southern Conference) (1940–1941)
| 1940 | Jack Faber | 2–6–1 | 0–1–1 | 12th | | | |
| 1941 | Jack Faber | 3–5–1 | 1–2 | T–11th | | | |
Clark Shaughnessy (Southern Conference) (1942)
| 1942 | Clark Shaughnessy | 7–2 | 1–2 | T–12th | | | |
Clarence Spears (Southern Conference) (1943–1944)
| 1943 | Clarence Spears | 4–5 | 2–0 | 2nd | | | |
| 1944 | Clarence Spears | 1–7–1 | 1–1 | 6th | | | |
Bear Bryant (Southern Conference) (1945)
| 1945 | Bear Bryant | 6–2–1 | 3–2 | 5th | | | |
Clark Shaughnessy (Southern Conference) (1946)
| 1946 | Clark Shaughnessy | 3–6 | 2–5 | 12th | | | |
Jim Tatum (Southern Conference) (1947–1952)
| 1947 | Jim Tatum | 7–2–2 | 3–2–1 | T–6th | T Gator | | |
| 1948 | Jim Tatum | 6–4 | 4–2 | 6th | | | |
| 1949 | Jim Tatum | 9–1 | 4–0 | 2nd | W Gator | | 14 |
| 1950 | Jim Tatum | 7–2–1 | 4–1–1 | 5th | | | |
| 1951 | Jim Tatum | 10–0 | 5–0 | T–1st | W Sugar | 4 | 3 |
| 1952 | Jim Tatum | 7–2 | 0–0 (Note: The Southern Conference sanctioned Maryland during the 1952 season for accepting a bowl bid the previous season. The Terrapins were disallowed from playing any conference opponents.) | | | 13 | 13 |
Jim Tatum (Atlantic Coast Conference) (1953–1955)
| 1953 | Jim Tatum | 10–1 | 3–0 | T–1st | L Orange | 1 | 1 |
| 1954 | Jim Tatum | 7–2–1 | 4–0–1 | 2nd | | 11 | 8 |
| 1955 | Jim Tatum | 10–1 | 4–0 | T–1st | L Orange | 3 | 3 |
Tommy Mont (Atlantic Coast Conference) (1956–1958)
| 1956 | Tommy Mont | 2–7–1 | 0–3–1 | 4th | | | |
| 1957 | Tommy Mont | 5–5 | 4–3 | 3rd | | | |
| 1958 | Tommy Mont | 4–6 | 3–3 | 5th | | | |
Tom Nugent (Atlantic Coast Conference) (1959–1965)
| 1959 | Tom Nugent | 5–5 | 4–2 | 3rd | | | |
| 1960 | Tom Nugent | 6–4 | 5–2 | 3rd | | | |
| 1961 | Tom Nugent | 7–3 | 3–3 | T–3rd | | | |
| 1962 | Tom Nugent | 6–4 | 5–2 | 3rd | | | |
| 1963 | Tom Nugent | 3–7 | 2–5 | 5th | | | |
| 1964 | Tom Nugent | 5–5 | 4–3 | T–3rd | | | |
| 1965 | Tom Nugent | 4–6 | 3–3 | T–3rd | | | |
Lou Saban (Atlantic Coast Conference) (1966)
| 1966 | Lou Saban | 4–6 | 3–3 | T–3rd | | | |
Bob Ward (Atlantic Coast Conference) (1967–1968)
| 1967 | Bob Ward | 0–9 | 0–6 | 8th | | | |
| 1968 | Bob Ward | 2–8 | 2–5 | 7th | | | |
Roy Lester (Atlantic Coast Conference) (1979–1971)
| 1969 | Roy Lester | 3–7 | 3–3 | T–3rd | | | |
| 1970 | Roy Lester | 2–9 | 2–4 | T–6th | | | |
| 1971 | Roy Lester | 2–9 | 1–5 | 8th | | | |
Jerry Claiborne (Atlantic Coast Conference) (1972–1981)
| 1972 | Jerry Claiborne | 5–5–1 | 3–2–1 | 3rd | | | |
| 1973 | Jerry Claiborne | 8–4 | 5–1 | 2nd | L Peach | 18 | 20 |
| 1974 | Jerry Claiborne | 8–4 | 6–0 | 1st | L Liberty | 13 | 13 |
| 1975 | Jerry Claiborne | 9–2–1 | 5–0 | 1st | W Gator | 11 | 13 |
| 1976 | Jerry Claiborne | 11–1 | 5–0 | 1st | L Cotton | 11 | 8 |
| 1977 | Jerry Claiborne | 8–4 | 4–2 | T–3rd | W Hall of Fame Classic | | |
| 1978 | Jerry Claiborne | 9–3 | 5–1 | 2nd | L Sun | | 20 |
| 1979 | Jerry Claiborne | 7–4 | 4–2 | T–2nd | | | |
| 1980 | Jerry Claiborne | 8–4 | 5–1 | 2nd | L Tangerine | | |
| 1981 | Jerry Claiborne | 4–6–1 | 4–2 | 3rd | | | |
Bobby Ross (Atlantic Coast Conference) (1982–1986)
| 1982 | Bobby Ross | 8–4 | 5–1 | 2nd | L Aloha | 20 | 20 |
| 1983 | Bobby Ross | 8–4 | 5–1 | 1st | L Florida Citrus | | |
| 1984 | Bobby Ross | 9–3 | 6–0 | 1st | W Sun | 11 | 12 |
| 1985 | Bobby Ross | 9–3 | 6–0 | 1st | W Cherry | 19 | 18 |
| 1986 | Bobby Ross | 5–5–1 | 2–3–1 | 5th | | | |
Joe Krivak (Atlantic Coast Conference) (1987–1991)
| 1987 | Joe Krivak | 4–7 | 3–3 | 5th | | | |
| 1988 | Joe Krivak | 5–6 | 4–3 | T–4th | | | |
| 1989 | Joe Krivak | 3–7–1 | 2–5 | 6th | | | |
| 1990 | Joe Krivak | 6–5–1 | 4–3 | 4th | T Independence | | |
| 1991 | Joe Krivak | 2–9 | 2–5 | 6th | | | |
Mark Duffner (Atlantic Coast Conference) (1992–1996)
| 1992 | Mark Duffner | 3–8 | 2–6 | 8th | | | |
| 1993 | Mark Duffner | 2–9 | 2–6 | T–7th | | | |
| 1994 | Mark Duffner | 4–7 | 2–6 | 7th | | | |
| 1995 | Mark Duffner | 6–5 | 4–4 | T–5th | | | |
| 1996 | Mark Duffner | 5–6 | 3–5 | T–6th | | | |
Ron Vanderlinden (Atlantic Coast Conference) (1997–2000)
| 1997 | Ron Vanderlinden | 2–9 | 1–7 | 8th | | | |
| 1998 | Ron Vanderlinden | 3–8 | 1–7 | T–8th | | | |
| 1999 | Ron Vanderlinden | 5–6 | 2–6 | T–8th | | | |
| 2000 | Ron Vanderlinden | 5–6 | 3–5 | T–6th | | | |
Ralph Friedgen (Atlantic Coast Conference) (2001–2010)
| 2001 | Ralph Friedgen | 10–2 | 7–1 | 1st | L Orange^{†} | 10 | 11 |
| 2002 | Ralph Friedgen | 11–3 | 6–2 | T–2nd | W Peach | 13 | 13 |
| 2003 | Ralph Friedgen | 10–3 | 6–2 | 2nd | W Gator | 20 | 17 |
| 2004 | Ralph Friedgen | 5–6 | 3–5 | T–8th | | | |
| 2005 | Ralph Friedgen | 5–6 | 3–5 | T–4th (Atlantic) | | | |
| 2006 | Ralph Friedgen | 9–4 | 5–3 | T–2nd (Atlantic) | W Champs Sports | | |
| 2007 | Ralph Friedgen | 6–7 | 3–5 | T–5th (Atlantic) | L Emerald | | |
| 2008 | Ralph Friedgen | 8–5 | 4–4 | T–3rd (Atlantic) | W Humanitarian | | |
| 2009 | Ralph Friedgen | 2–10 | 1–7 | 6th (Atlantic) | | | |
| 2010 | Ralph Friedgen | 9–4 | 5–3 | T–2nd (Atlantic) | W Military | 24 | 23 |
Randy Edsall (Atlantic Coast Conference) (2011–2013)
| 2011 | Randy Edsall | 2–10 | 1–7 | 6th (Atlantic) | | | |
| 2012 | Randy Edsall | 4–8 | 2–6 | 5th (Atlantic) | | | |
| 2013 | Randy Edsall | 7–6 | 3–5 | 5th (Atlantic) | L Military | | |
Randy Edsall (Big Ten Conference) (2014–2015)
| 2014 | Randy Edsall | 7–6 | 4–4 | 3rd (East) | L Foster Farms | | |
| 2015 | Randy Edsall (Note: The Terrapins were led by fifth-year head coach Randy Edsall, who was fired after starting the season 2–4. Offensive coordinator Mike Locksley was promoted to interim head coach for the remainder of the season.) | 3–9 | 1–7 | T–6th (East) | | | |
D. J. Durkin (Big Ten Conference) (2016–2017)
| 2016 | D. J. Durkin | 6–7 | 3–6 | 5th (East) | L Quick Lane | | |
| 2017 | D. J. Durkin | 4–8 | 2–7 | 6th (East) | | | |
Matt Canada (Big Ten Conference) (2018)
| 2018 | Matt Canada (Note: Following the death of offensive lineman Jordan McNair during a spring football practice, significant scrutiny was laid on head coach D. J. Durkin and his football staff. Following an investigation, Durkin was suspended and offensive coordinator Matt Canada was named interim coach. Durkin was fired on October 31, despite an internal investigation finding that the team did not have a "toxic culture".) | 5–7 | 3–6 | 5th (East) | | | |
Mike Locksley (Big Ten Conference) (2019–present)
| 2019 | Mike Locksley | 3–9 | 1–8 | 6th (East) | | | |
| 2020 | Mike Locksley | 2–3 | 2–3 | 4th (East) | | | |
| 2021 | Mike Locksley | 7–6 | 3–6 | 5th (East) | W Pinstripe | | |
| 2022 | Mike Locksley | 8–5 | 4–5 | 4th (East) | W Mayo | | |
| 2023 | Mike Locksley | 8–5 | 4–5 | 4th (East) | W Music City | | |
| 2024 | Mike Locksley | 4–8 | 1–8 | 17th | | | |
| 2025 | Mike Locksley | 4–8 | 1–8 | T–16th | | | |
| Total: | | 674–627–43 | | | | | |
National championship Conference title Conference division title or championship game berth
^{†}Indicates Bowl Coalition, Bowl Alliance, BCS, or CFP / New Years' Six bowl.; ^{#}Rankings from final Coaches Poll.
