= 1897 Maryland Aggies football team =

American college football season

1897 Maryland Aggies football
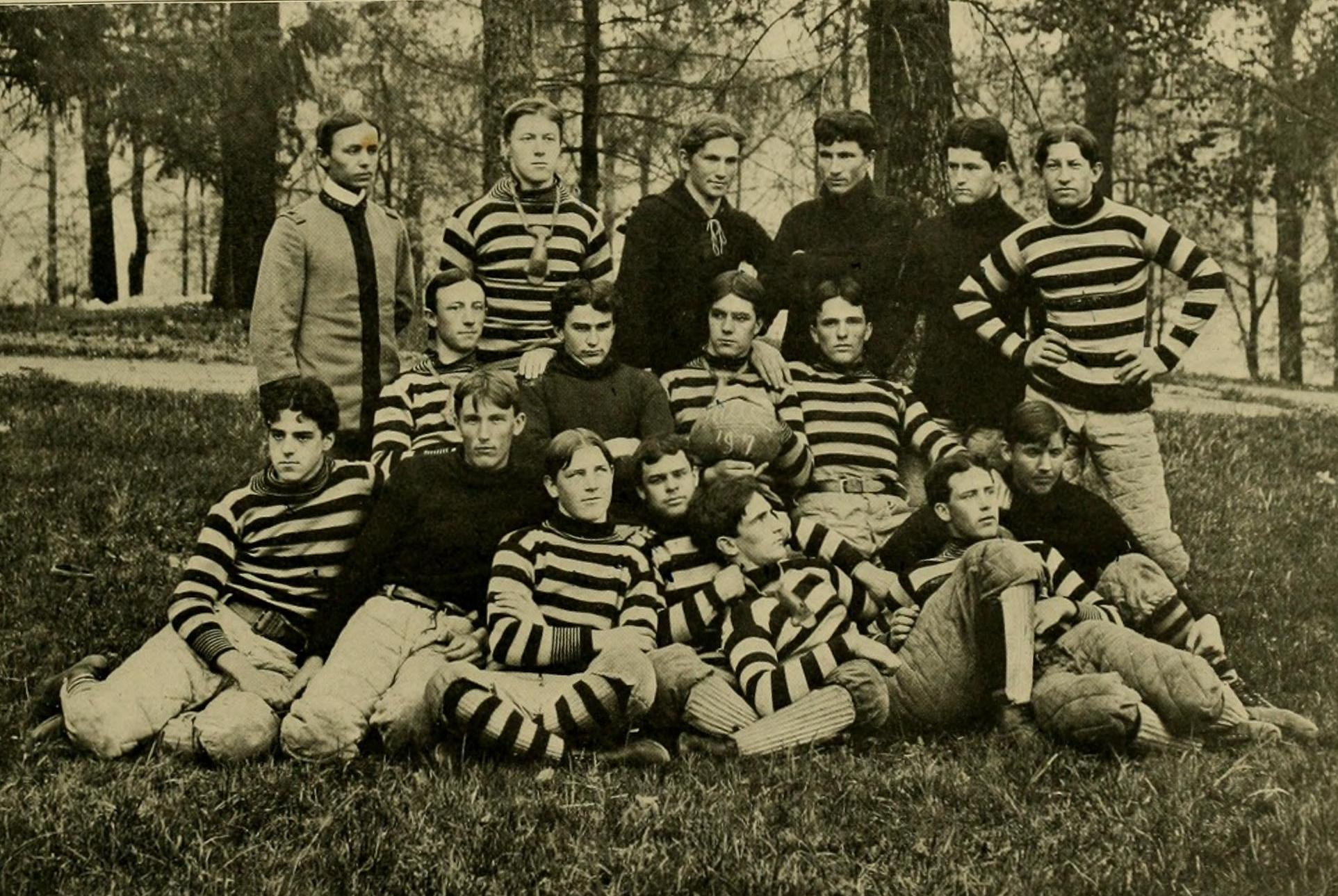
- Conference: Maryland Intercollegiate Football Association
- Record: 2–4 (0–3 MIFA)
- Head coach: John Lillibridge (1st season)
- Captain: John Lillibridge

1897 Maryland Intercollegiate Football Association standings
	Conf.					Overall
Team	W		L		T	W		L		T
Gallaudet $	3	–	0	–	1	4	–	1	–	1
Maryland	0	–	3	–	0	2	–	4	–	0
$ – Conference champion

The 1897 Maryland Aggies football team represented the Maryland Agricultural College (now the University of Maryland) in the 1897 college football season. The team was led by second-year head coach Grenville Lewis.

== Schedule ==
Date	Opponent	Site	Result
October 16	Central High School*	College Park, MD	W 24–6
October 20	Eastern High School*	College Park, MD	W 4–0
October 30	Johns Hopkins	College Park, MD	L 6–30
November 13	at St. John's (MD)	Annapolis, MD	L 4–6
November 17	Gallaudet	College Park, MD	L 6–16
November 20	at Baltimore Medical*	Electric Park; Baltimore, MD	L 0–10
*Non-conference game

== Players ==
The letterwinners of the 1897 team were:

- James Blandford, guard
- William Bouscaren, halfback
- Dorsey Cashell, guard
- Grant C. Church, end
- Sam Cooke, fullback
- Charles Gibbons, halfback
- Wade Hinebaugh, end
- Frank Kenly, quarterback
- John Lillibridge, end and captain-coach
- Charles Ridgeley, tackle/fullback
- James Shipley, center

Non-letterwinners:

- Fred Bell, tackle
- Vernon Rollins, tackle
- Ed Speake, tackle
- Bob Hildebrand, guard
- Harry Stanford, guard
- Hanson Mitchell, quarterback
- Levin Dericksen, halfback
- George Peterson, halfback

Manager:

- John Mitchell
