= Maryland Terrapins football, 1892–1946 =

Late 19th and early 20th-century era of the Maryland Terrapins

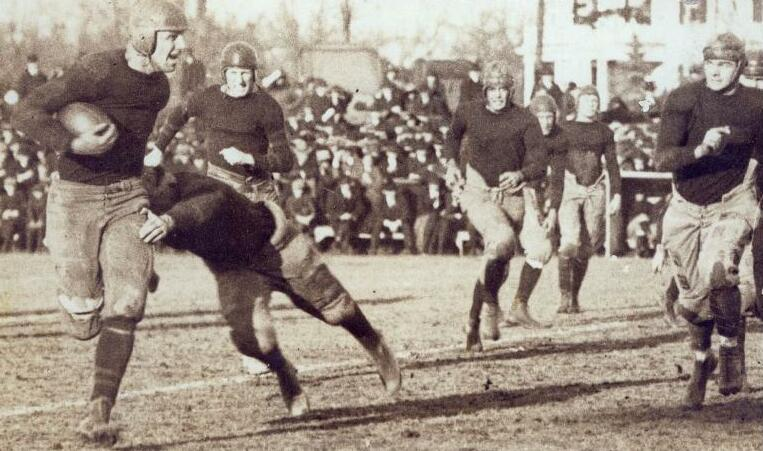
Maryland playing Johns Hopkins in 1919 during Curley Byrd's coaching tenure.

The modern Maryland Terrapins football program representing the University of Maryland traces its lineage to the team first formed at what was then the Maryland Agricultural College (MAC) in 1892. In the initial years, due to the rudimentary state of intercollegiate athletics and interstate travel, all games were played against local colleges, high schools, and athletic clubs.

In 1902, Maryland hired its first professional coach, John Markey, and soon after drafted a "football philosophy", an early attempt at a codification of college football. During his tenure as head coach from 1911 to 1934, Harry C. "Curley" Byrd significantly increased Maryland's strength of schedule, and recorded victories over then-powerhouses Penn and Yale. Byrd also greatly increased school support and interest in the sport, and was responsible for the building of the school's first stadium in 1923.

Byrd became the university president in 1935, and continued his support for Maryland football from that office. As a coach, he was succeeded by several prominent individuals, namely Clark Shaughnessy, who had perfected the T-formation, and Paul "Bear" Bryant, who later went on to great success at Alabama. After just one season at Maryland, a conflict with Byrd resulted in Bryant's departure.

== The early years: 1892–1901 ==
=== Introduction of football at Maryland ===
Informally, football and baseball games had been played at the Maryland Agricultural College as early as the time of the Civil War. In 1890, an unofficial school team composed mostly of Maryland Agricultural students saw action against local high schools Laurel and Sandy Spring. It was not officially sanctioned by the college, but was allowed to use the school's name. In 1891, the same team played three games against Gallaudet, Hyattsville, and Sandy Spring. The victory over Sandy Spring prompted the MAC faculty to officially recognize the team.

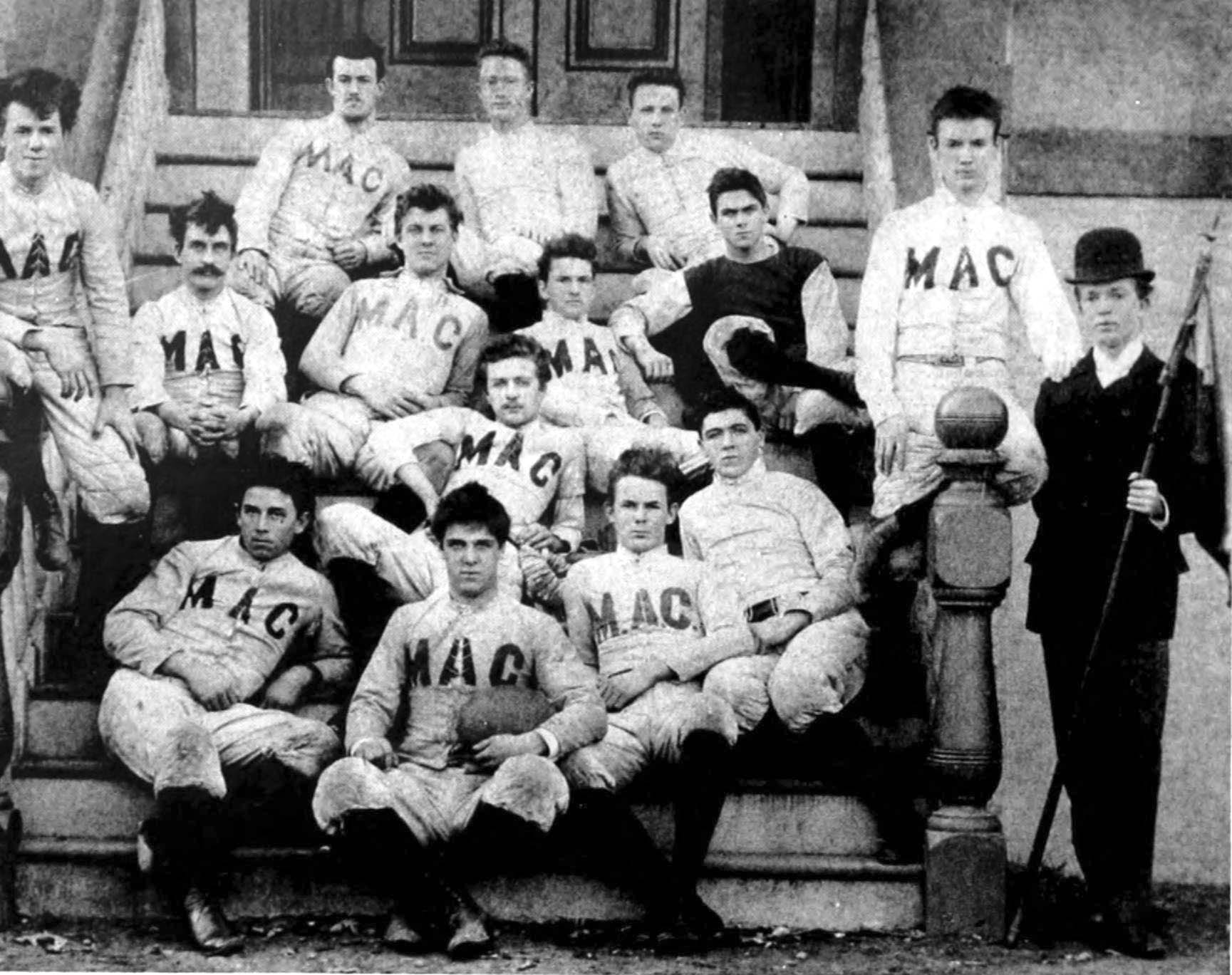
The first official Maryland Agricultural College football team in 1892

In 1892, the first official Maryland Agricultural football team, known as the "Aggies" or "Farmers", was formed by quarterback William Skinner, who also served concurrently as the head coach. They went scoreless in that inaugural season with losses to St. John's College, Johns Hopkins, and Episcopal High School. In the game against Episcopal, halfback Pearse "Shorty" Prough gained the only positive yardage for the team—after first running in the wrong direction for 30 yards, before changing course for a net gain of 35 yards. Episcopal's school newspaper, the Monthly Chronicle, stated that the play "showed an unaccreditable ignorance of football."

The following season, in 1893, showed significant improvement. Maryland won all six of its games, including ones against Baltimore City College, St. John's, and Western Maryland. The St. John's match was controversial, however. After the game, St. John's players wrote in the Baltimore American that "a decision by which the M.A.C. were allowed to score the only touchdown made by the quarterback after a run of 90 yards, with no one in pursuit, appeared a very doubtful one." At the end of the season, Maryland Agricultural was awarded both the District of Columbia and the state collegiate championships. The awarding of the Maryland state championship, however, was protested by St. John's, which claimed that it was the deserving team.

=== Formation of the MIFA ===
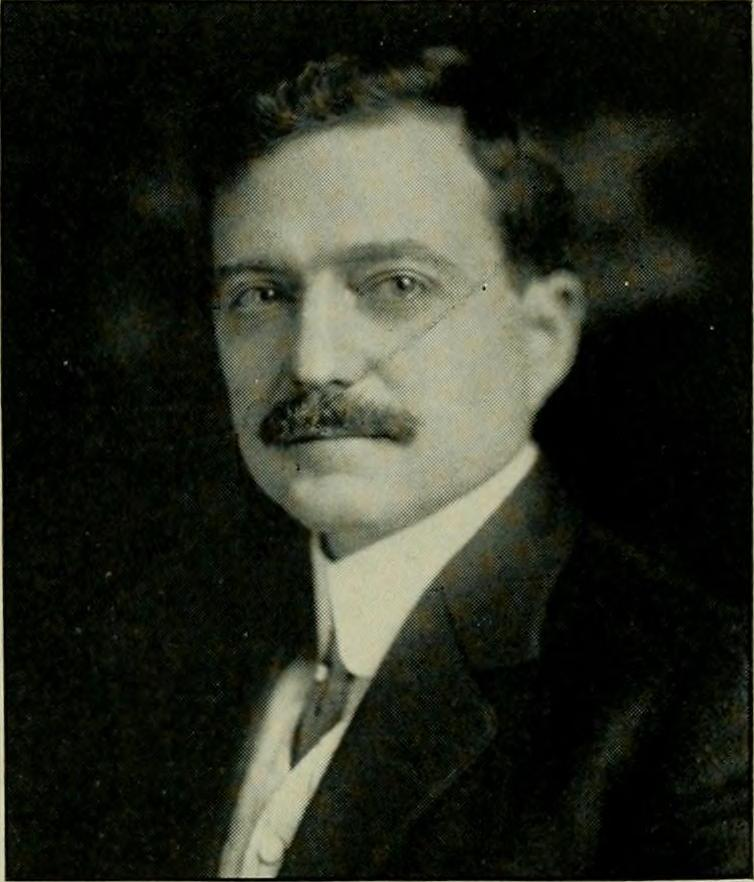
William W. Skinner, Maryland's first quarterback and head coach, played an integral role in the formation of the MIFA.

In 1894, former coach and quarterback William Skinner helped lead the formation of the Maryland Intercollegiate Football Association (MIFA) in order to improve the process of naming the state champions. Other teams involved included Baltimore City College, Gallaudet, Johns Hopkins, Washington College, and Western Maryland. The game against St. John's once again aroused controversy, and the MAC accused their opponent of hiring ringers from Lehigh. When Johns Hopkins canceled their game, Maryland arranged to play Georgetown instead. The Maryland team called the game with a 6–4 lead as darkness fell. However, the referee, Georgetown halfback Mike Mahoney, ruled it a forfeiture and awarded the win to Georgetown. Today, Maryland and Georgetown both count the game as a Maryland Agricultural win in their records.

=== A brief hiatus ===
In 1895, Maryland Agricultural, a land-grant school with a military curriculum requirement, had a new commandant of cadets take office. Lieutenant Clough Overton, who opposed football at the university, cut funding for equipment and instituted strict rules limiting practice time. Instead of accepting this serious disadvantage against their opponents, the players declined to field a football team for the season.

The following season, there was a renewal of football at Maryland. Fullback Grenville Lewis was elected as team captain and head coach. He instituted a strict physical training regimen involving calisthenics and long-distance running, and banned smoking, drinking, and eating pie during the football season. This was unpopular with the team, but Lewis was embraced by the students and faculty. In the game to decide the state championship, Maryland Agricultural faced Maryland-Baltimore. Late in the scoreless game, the Aggies pushed to their opponents' two-yard line. With darkness approaching and Maryland Agricultural having difficulty scoring, the referee called the game. It became clear that Maryland-Baltimore had sneaked three extra players onto the field, but the referee refused to award the Aggies the win. Two days later, the Maryland–Baltimore players voted to forfeit the game, and with it the championship, to Maryland Agricultural.

In 1897, Maryland faced Johns Hopkins for the first time since the Aggies' inaugural season. Hopkins beat Maryland handily, 30–6, and the Aggies went on to lose their next three games to finish the year with a 2–4 mark. The 1898 season saw the Aggies finish 2–5–1 and in 1899, the team canceled the remainder of its season after accumulating a 1–4 record. Maryland saw a marginal improvement to 3–4–1 in 1900, but then fell to a 1–7 season in 1901.

== The first professional coaches: 1902–1910 ==
=== A football philosophy ===
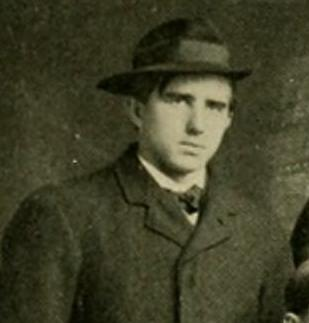
D. John Markey was Maryland's first paid football coach and also played on the team.

In 1902, Maryland Agricultural paid $300 for its first professional football coach, John Markey. Markey re-instated physical conditioning and incorporated a tackling dummy during practice for the first time at the school. He led Maryland to a 3–5–2 record his first season, before improving to 7–4 in his second year. Markey had not planned to play on the team, but was forced to fill in for a fullback who was intimidated by a death threat from a Georgetown fan. The following year, in the game against Columbian (now The George Washington University), their opponents complained that Markey was a professional. Maryland Agricultural responded with the same accusation against Columbian fullback Granville Church, and the teams came to an agreement to let both play. Markey went on to score the only points of the game in a 6–0 Maryland Agricultural victory.

At this time, there was no official regulating body for college sports. The Intercollegiate Athletic Association of the United States (IAAUS), predecessor to the National Collegiate Athletic Association (NCAA), was not formed until 1906. Maryland Agricultural attempted to rectify this lack of regulation by writing a "philosophy" for the sport, which stated in part that it would "offer no inducements to any athlete."

After his request for a salary increase was rebuffed, Markey coached part-time in 1904. Maryland recorded a 2–4–2 record, and he did not return as head coach the following year. Markey was replaced by Fred Nielsen, a former Nebraska halfback.

=== Arrival of Curley Byrd ===
Under Nielsen in 1905, Harry "Curley" Byrd began his long career at Maryland. He saw his first action as an end late in the 0–17 loss to the Naval Academy. Byrd impressed Nielsen enough to earn the starting position for the remainder of the season. He would also play baseball and run track and field at the school, where he set the records for the 50- (5.2 seconds), 100- (10 seconds), and 220-yard (22.3 seconds) dashes. In 1906, Byrd also played as a quarterback, and in 1907, a kicker. Additionally, he assisted with coaching, as head coach Charles Melick and assistant coach Durant Church had other full-time jobs.

== The Curley Byrd era: 1911–1934 ==
In 1911, Charley Donnelly was the head coach for the first seven games, before stepping down with a 2–4–1 record. Due to injuries, Maryland did not have enough players to field a practice squad and turned to local high schools for scrimmages. Curley Byrd was serving as the football coach at one of these high schools and agreed to take the head coaching job at Maryland, his alma mater. Byrd held that position for 24 years, making him the longest-serving football coach in school history. During this time, he developed a unique offensive scheme called the "Byrd system", which combined elements of the single-wing and double-wing formations. He also coached the basketball and baseball teams from 1913 to 1923.

=== Founding of the University of Maryland ===
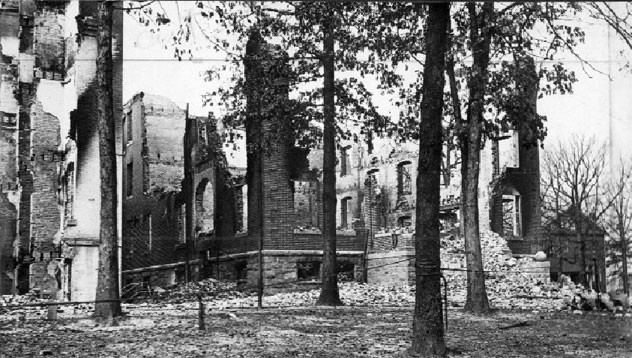
The Great Fire of 1912 devastated the Maryland campus.

The campus was devastated by a fire in 1912, which deepened the school's grave financial difficulties. In 1916, the state government took full control of the school and renamed it Maryland State College. Byrd became the assistant athletic director in 1918 and assisted in the consolidation with the professional colleges in Baltimore, which resulted in the creation of the University of Maryland. During this time, the team was referred as 'The Old Liners', most likely in reference to the state nickname.

During his tenure, Byrd greatly increased fan and faculty interest and financial support for football at Maryland. Prior to 1912, the team lacked any facilities and its one field left much to be desired. In 1915, Byrd requested funds for the school's first stadium and associated facilities.

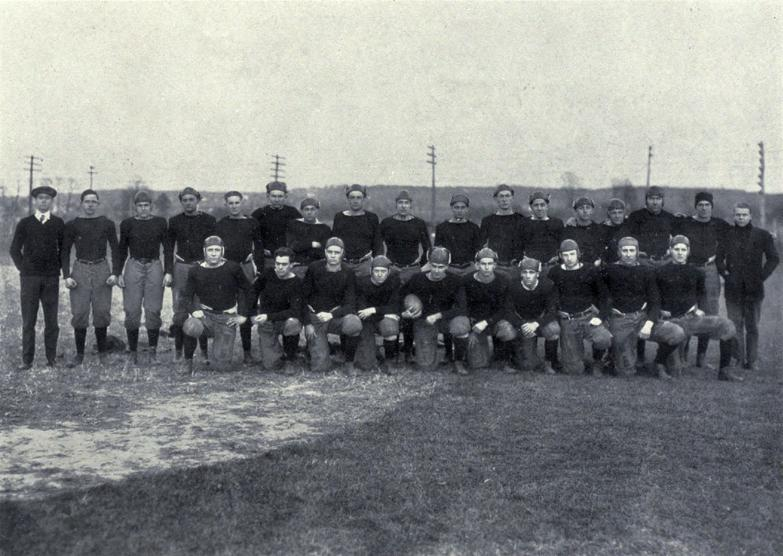
The 1914 state championship-winning Maryland Agricultural football team.

In 1913, Maryland Agricultural compiled a 6–3 record. The team shut-out four Maryland state universities: Johns Hopkins (26–0), Western Maryland (46–0), St. John's (13–0), and Washington College (20–0). For the feat, Maryland Agricultural won the state championship. In 1914, the MAC tallied a 5–3 record. In intrastate play, the Farmers recorded wins over Johns Hopkins, St. John's, and Washington College, and a loss to Western Maryland. Once again, the team secured the state championship. The following year, Maryland met Johns Hopkins at Homewood Field on Thanksgiving Day, which drew the venue's all-time record crowd of 13,000 spectators. Hopkins won a hard-fought defensive struggle, 3–0, and the two teams met on the occasion all but two subsequent years through 1934, the final game of the series.

Jack Faber, who played for Byrd at the time, said that Maryland scheduled games against "four or five schools every year we had no right beating." Maryland achieved a winning record each season during Byrd's first decade of coaching, from 1911 to 1920. In that period, the team also accumulated a 7–2–1 record against arch-rival Johns Hopkins. The following decade, the team played an increasingly difficult and farther afield schedule. During the 1920s Maryland recorded wins against some of the period's powerhouses: Yale, Rutgers, Princeton, Pennsylvania, Syracuse, Cornell, and North Carolina.

=== Conferences reshuffle ===
For the 1920 season, Maryland played in the South Atlantic Intercollegiate Athletic Association (SAIAA). Meanwhile, members of the Southern Intercollegiate Athletic Association (SIAA) were locked in a heated debate over whether first-year students should be eligible to play football. The larger schools, in general, were against the practice, and eventually the disagreement resulted in a schism within the SIAA. Eight teams from the SIAA split to form the Southern Conference: Alabama, Auburn, Clemson, Georgia, Georgia Tech, Kentucky, Mississippi State, and Tennessee. They were joined by six non-SIAA members: North Carolina, North Carolina State, Virginia, Virginia Tech, Washington & Lee, and Maryland. Maryland would remain within the Southern Conference for the next three decades.

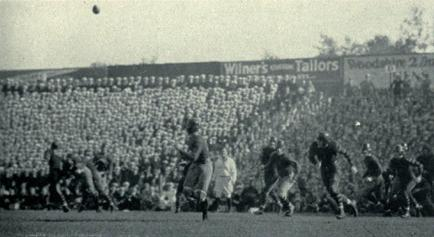
In 1931, Maryland sees action against in-state rival Navy at Griffith Stadium in Washington, D.C.

In 1923, the eponymous stadium, for which Byrd had petitioned funding, was completed at a cost of $60,000 with a maximum capacity of 10,000. That season was also one of Byrd's most successful. He hired former Maryland quarterback and future long-time basketball coach, Burton Shipley, as an assistant coach. The team shutout five of its opponents and held Johns Hopkins and Catholic to just six points apiece, for an overall record of 7–2–1. The only losses came at Yale and against Virginia Tech. Maryland led Yale, 14–12, at halftime, but a referee ruled incomplete a drop kick that Byrd claimed was good by a "country mile". Yale won the game, 16–14. Mainly for his performance against Yale and Penn, end Bill "Zeke" Supplee was named an All-American by the Associated Press. He was the first Maryland player honored as such.

In 1928, Maryland finished with a 6–3–1 record, but tallied wins over "three of [its] ancient rivals": Johns Hopkins, Yale, and Virginia. That season, Gerald "Snitz" Snyder became the second Old Liner to be named an All-American, when the Associated Press selected him to their second-team.

In 1933, Byrd spearheaded the adoption of the diamondback terrapin as the official school mascot. He had already renamed the student newspaper The Diamondback in 1921, and the football team was referred to as the "Terrapins", in addition to the older nicknames, as early as 1928. At some point, newspapers shortened the nickname to the "Terps" in order to abridge headlines.

== Big-name coaches: 1935–1946 ==
When Byrd became the university president in 1935, Jack Faber replaced him as head coach and accumulated a 7–2–2 record. The following year, Frank Dobson, former Georgia Tech assistant coach under John Heisman, assumed the head coaching position. After a 6–5 first season, Dobson led the Terrapins to an 8–2 record in 1937. The highlight of the season was a 13–0 shutout of 17th-ranked Syracuse. In the homecoming game, Charlie Weidinger completed a pass to William Bryant for a 13–7 go-ahead over Florida. The Terrapins' two losses came against Penn and Penn State, the latter being the second game in a rivalry that would bedevil Maryland throughout its entire duration. At the end of the season, Maryland was declared the Southern Conference champions, the team's first major conference title.

The following two years, 1938 and 1939, saw Dobson's teams accumulate 2–7 records, and he was replaced by Jack Faber. However, Faber did not have much more success, going 2–6–1 in 1940 and 3–5–1 in 1941.

=== Shaughnessy's T-formation ===
In 1942, Clark Shaughnessy was hired as head coach. Shaughnessy had achieved fame at Stanford, where he installed his quarterback-centric version of the T-formation as his primary offensive scheme. In response, Glenn "Pop" Warner had said, "If Stanford wins a single game with that crazy formation, you can throw all the football I ever knew in the Pacific Ocean." Stanford, which had gone 1–7–1 the previous season, went undefeated in Shaughnessy's first year and earned the number-two ranking in the final AP Poll. Shaughnessy was named 1940 College Coach of the Year for the turnaround performance. Under Shaughnessy, the Terps went 7–2, with one of the losses a 0–42 shutout at Duke, which in five seasons had won the Southern Conference three times and been ranked in the AP top-20 four times. After one season, Shaughnessy left Maryland for Pittsburgh.

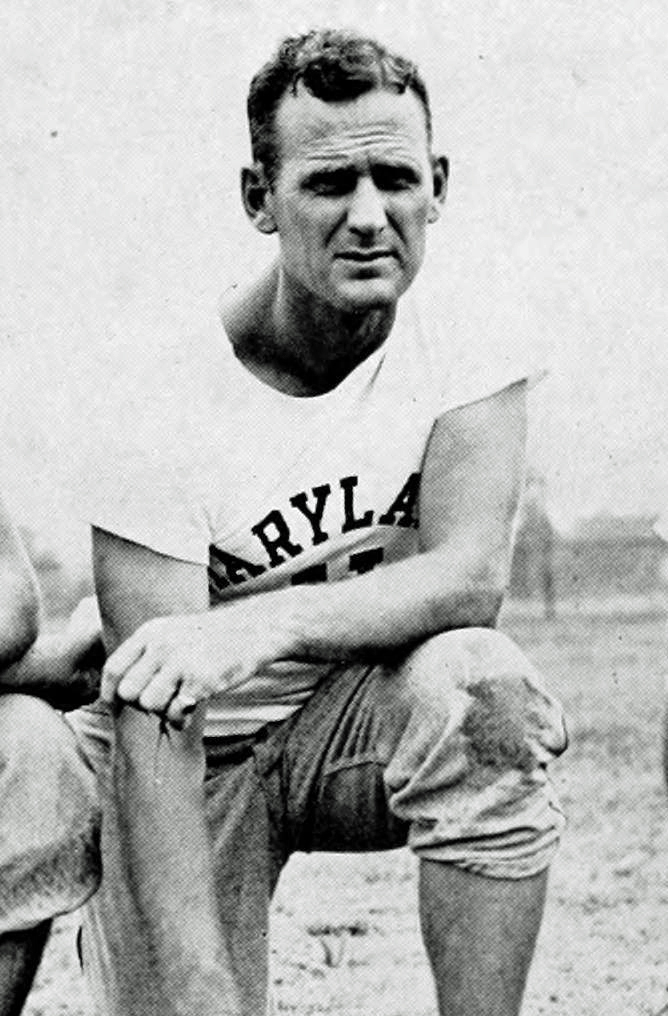
Paul "Bear" Bryant began his long and distinguished coaching career at Maryland.

For 1943 and 1944, Clarence Spears was the Maryland head coach. Like Shaughnessy, Spears had taken an underachieving team and turned them around. In 1925, he took over Minnesota, which had posted a 3–3–2 record the prior season, and led them to a share of the 1927 Big Ten championship. However, at Maryland, when Spears accumulated a record of 5–12–1 after two seasons, he too was replaced.

=== Bryant's brief stint ===
In 1945, Paul "Bear" Bryant, who would later go on to achieve legendary status among football coaches, was named the head coach at Maryland. During his first year as a college head coach, Bryant led Maryland to a respectable 6–2–1 record, including a last-second win over out-of-state rival Virginia. However, he resigned after just one season, when university president Curley Byrd reinstated a player that Bryant had suspended.

In 1946, Clark Shaughnessy returned from Pittsburgh to Maryland for one more season. That year, the Terrapins recorded a 3–6 season including losses to North Carolina, South Carolina, Michigan State, and N.C. State. After that, Shaughnessy went on to coach the National Football League's Los Angeles Rams in 1948 and 1949.

== See also ==
- List of Maryland Terrapins football seasons
