= 1896 Maryland Aggies football team =

American college football season

1896 Maryland Aggies football
- Conference: Maryland Intercollegiate Football Association
- Record: 6–2–2 (1–0–1 MIFA)
- Head coach: Grenville Lewis (1st season)
- Captain: Grenville Lewis

1896 Maryland Intercollegiate Football Association standings
	Conf.					Overall
Team	W		L		T	W		L		T
Maryland		–		–		6	–	2	–	2
$ – Conference champion

The 1896 Maryland Aggies football team represented the Maryland Agricultural College (now the University of Maryland) in the 1896 college football season. The team was led by first-year head coach Grenville Lewis and finished with a 6–2–2 record.

== Schedule ==
Date	Opponent	Site	Result
October 10	Eastern High School*	College Park, MD	L 0–6
October 17	Gallaudet	College Park, MD	T 0–0
October 17	Washington Business High School*	College Park, MD	W 34–0
October 29	Washington Central High School*	College Park, MD	W 10–6
November 4	Alexandria High School*	College Park, MD	W 18–0
November 7	Episcopal High School*	College Park, MD	L 0–6
November 10	at Bethel Military Academy*	Warrenton, VA	W 20–10
November 14	at Western Maryland	Westminster, MD	W 16–6
November 17	Central High School*	College Park, MD	W 14–0
November 21	at University of Maryland, Baltimore*	Maryland Oval; Baltimore, MD	T 0–0
*Non-conference game

== Personnel ==
The letterwinners of the 1897 team were:

- Charlie Gibbons, end
- John Lillibridge, end
- F. H. Peters, end
- Albert Talty, end
- Fred Bell, tackle
- Bill Gardner, tackle
- Reeder Gough, tackle
- Harry Heward, tackle
- Bert Nelligan, tackle
- Charles Calvert, guard
- Wade Hinebaugh, guard
- Herbert Owen, guard
- Charles Queen, guard
- Charles Ridgely, guard
- Butch Carver, center
- Franklin Sherman, center
- Pete Duffy, quarterback
- Frank Kenly, quarterback
- Hanson Mitchell, quarterback
- Charles Cabrera, halfback
- Bill Gorsuch, halfback
- Bert Nelligan, halfback
- Ben Watkins, halfback
- Grenville Lewis, fullback, captain-coach

Manager:

- Albert Gill
