= Samuel Harding (American football) =

American football player and coach (1873–1919)

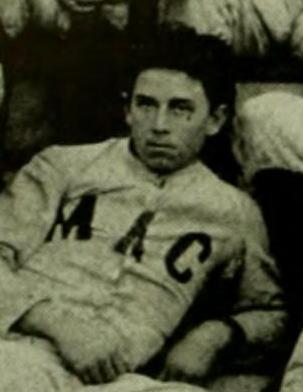
- Harding at Maryland in 1892

Biographical details
- Born: January 19, 1873; Highland, Maryland, U.S.
- Died: May 19, 1919 (aged 46); Washington, D.C., U.S.

Playing career
- 1892–1894: Maryland
- Position: Tackle

Coaching career (HC unless noted)
- 1893: Maryland
- 1899: Maryland (interim HC)

Head coaching record
- Overall: 6–0

Samuel Herbert "Pop" Harding (January 19, 1873 – May 19, 1919) was an American college football player and coach. He served as head football coach at Maryland Agricultural College—now known as the University of Maryland, College Park—in 1893 and led the team to a perfect 6–0 record and its first winning season.

== Biography ==
Harding was born on January 19, 1873, in Highland, Maryland. He attended the Maryland Agricultural College (now the University of Maryland), where he played on the football team as a tackle from 1892 to 1894. In 1899, the Baltimore American wrote that he was "regarded as one of the best general athletes the college ever had." Harding served as the team captain and player-coach during the 1893 season and the Aggies amassed a perfect 6–0 record. His assistant coach was fullback Arthur Pue Gorman Jr., son of a United States Senator from Maryland. Harding graduated from Maryland Agricultural College in 1895 with a Bachelor of Science degree from the Scientific Course.

Beginning in 1896, Harding worked as a skilled laborer for the Water Department in Washington, D.C. In the first football game of the 1899 season, Maryland was defeated, 21–0, by Western Maryland, and its coach and best player, fullback S. S. Cooke, was forced to retire after an arm injury. The athletic director, H. A. Harrison, decided the team would finish out its schedule, and Harding returned to fill in as coach.

Harding married Marian Boyle on October 15, 1901. In 1906, he rose to the position of foreman in the Water Department. Harding later worked as a clerk for the Washington, D.C. city government. He died on May 17, 1919, and was interred in Forest Glen, Maryland.

== Head coaching record ==
Year	Team	Overall	Conference	Standing	Bowl/playoffs
Maryland Aggies (Independent) (1906)
1893	Maryland	6–0			
Maryland:		6–0			
Total:		6–0			
