= 1897 Gallaudet Bison football team =

American college football season

1897 Gallaudet Bison football

MIFA champion
- Conference: Maryland Intercollegiate Football Association
- Record: 4–1–1 (3–0–1 MIFA)
- Home stadium: Kendall Green

1897 Maryland Intercollegiate Football Association standings
	Conf.					Overall
Team	W		L		T	W		L		T
Gallaudet $	3	–	0	–	1	4	–	1	–	1
Maryland	0	–	3	–	0	2	–	4	–	0
$ – Conference champion

The 1897 Gallaudet Bison football team represented Gallaudet University, a college for deaf-mutes, as a member of the Maryland Intercollegiate Football Association (MIFA) during the 1897 college football season. The Gallaudet compiled an overall record of 4–1–1 with a mark of 3–0–1, winning the MIFA title.

== Schedule ==
Date	Opponent	Site	Result
	Johns Hopkins	Kendall Green; Washington, DC	W 6–4
November 6	at Virginia	Madison Hall Field; Charlottesville, VA	L 4–20
November 17	at Maryland	College Park, MD	W 16–6
November 20	Western Maryland	Kendall Green; Washington, D. C.	W 6–4
December 4	at St. John's (MD)	Annapolis, MD	T 6–6
	All-High School		W 16–4
