= William Lang (American football) =

American football coach

Biographical details
- Education: University of Delaware

Coaching career (HC unless noted)
- 1908-1909: Maryland

Head coaching record
- Overall: 5–13

William Lang was an American college football coach. He served as the head football coach at Maryland Agricultural College—now known as the University of Maryland, College Park—from 1908 to 1909, compiling record of 5–13. Lang co-coached the team with Edward Larkin in 1909. Lang was an alumnus of the University of Delaware.

== Head coaching record ==
Year	Team	Overall	Conference	Standing	Bowl/playoffs
Maryland Aggies (Independent) (1908–1909)
1908	Maryland	3–8			
1909	Maryland	2–5			
Maryland:		5–13			
Total:		5–13			
