= Emmons Dunbar =

American agriculturist, football player, and coach (1882–1954)

Emmons B. Dunbar
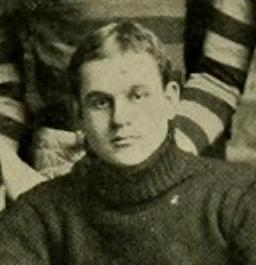
- Dunbar at Maryland in 1902

Biographical details
- Born: March 24, 1882; Springville, New York, U.S.
- Died: July 20, 1954 (aged 72); Gowanda, New York, U.S.

Playing career
- 1900–1902: Maryland
- Position: Guard

Coaching career (HC unless noted)
- 1901: Maryland

Head coaching record
- Overall: 1–7

Emmons Burdette Dunbar (March 24, 1882 – July 20, 1954) was an American agriculturalist and college football coach. He served as the head football coach at Maryland Agricultural College—now known as the University of Maryland, College Park—in 1901, compiling a record of 1–7.

== Biography ==
Dunbar was born in Springville, New York, in 1882. As a youth, he was tutored by fellow Springville native and legendary coach Pop Warner in the intricacies of the unbalanced line used to great effect by the Carlisle Indians. In 1900, Dunbar enrolled in the Maryland Agricultural College, where he played on the football team as a guard from 1900 to 1902. The team elected him as captain in 1902, but he broke his leg in the second game against Mount Saint Joseph College. Dunbar graduated from the Maryland Agricultural College in 1903 with a Bachelor's Degree from the Agricultural Course. He married in 1910 and worked as an agronomist for the I. A. Corporation in Buffalo, New York. Dunbar was a member of the Freemasons.

== Head coaching record ==
Year	Team	Overall	Conference	Standing	Bowl/playoffs
Maryland Aggies (Independent) (1901)
1901	Maryland	1–7			
Maryland:		1–7			
Total:		1–7			
