= Royal Alston =

American football player and coach

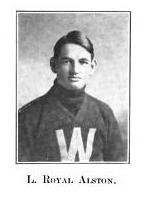
- Alston at George Washington in 1908

Biographical details
- Born: c. 1888; Lake Charles, Louisiana, U.S.

Playing career
- 1908–1909: George Washington
- Position(s): Tackle

Coaching career (HC unless noted)
- 1910: Maryland

Head coaching record
- Overall: 4–3–1

Larkin Royal Alston (c. 1888 – date of death unknown) was an American college football coach. He served as the head football coach Maryland Agricultural College—now known as the University of Maryland, College Park—in 1910.

A native of Louisiana, he was born to Lafayette Volney and Mary (née Cotton) Alston. He attended Lake Charles High School, where he played on the football team for three years. He attended college at the George Washington University where he studied mechanical engineering. He played as a tackle on the football team and served as team captain in 1909.

In 1910, the Maryland Agricultural College hired Alston as its head coach. After a 4–0–1 start to the season, Alston held half of the Aggies' starting backs out of the game against the Virginia Military Institute, with the intention of resting them for the following week's game against St. John's. The plan backfired, however, and Maryland lost both games, 8–0 and 6–0, respectively. The Aggies finished the season with a loss to Western Maryland and a 4–3–1 record. Alston did not return to Maryland for a second season as head coach.

== Head coaching record ==
Year	Team	Overall	Conference	Standing	Bowl/playoffs
Maryland Aggies (Independent) (1910)
1910	Maryland	4–3–1			
Maryland:		4–3–1			
Total:		4–3–1			
