= Maryland Terrapins football =

American football team of the University of Maryland, College Park

| 2026 Maryland Terrapins football team |
- First season: 1892; 134 years ago
- Athletic director: James E. Smith
- General manager: Geroy Simon
- Head coach: Aazaar Abdul-Rahim (interim); 1st season, 2–1 (.667)
- Location: College Park, Maryland
- Stadium: SECU Stadium (capacity: 46,185)
- NCAA division: Division I FBS
- Conference: Big Ten
- Colors: Red, white, black, and gold
- All-time record: 685–630–43 (.520)
- Bowl record: 14–14–2 (.500)

National championships
- Claimed: 1953
- Unclaimed: 1951

Conference championships
- SoCon: 1937, 1951 ACC: 1953, 1955, 1974, 1975, 1976, 1983, 1984, 1985, 2001
- Consensus All-Americans: 12
- Rivalries: Rutgers (rivalry); Penn State (rivalry); Virginia (rivalry); Navy (rivalry); West Virginia (rivalry)

Uniforms
- Fight song: Maryland Victory Song; Maryland Fight Song (Played after scoring a touchdown)
- Mascot: Testudo
- Marching band: Mighty Sound of Maryland
- Outfitter: Under Armour
- Website: umterps.com

The Maryland Terrapins football team represents the University of Maryland, College Park in the sport of American football. The Terrapins compete in the NCAA Division I Football Bowl Subdivision (FBS) and the Big Ten Conference. The Terrapins joined the Big Ten Conference on July 1, 2014, following 62 years in the Atlantic Coast Conference as a founding member. Aazaar Abdul-Rahim is the interim head coach of the Terrapins.

Since 1950, the Terrapins have played their home games at SECU Stadium in College Park, Maryland, with occasional home games in Baltimore, making them one of two FBS football teams in the Baltimore–Washington metropolitan area (Navy Midshipmen) and the closest Football Bowl Subdivision team to Washington, D.C. The team's official colors of red, white, black, and gold have been in use in some combination since the 1920s and are taken from Maryland's state flag. The Terrapins nickname — often abbreviated as "Terps" — was adopted in 1933 after the diamondback terrapin, a turtle species native to the state. Maryland shares storied rivalries with Virginia and West Virginia.

The program's achievements have included one national championship in 1953, nine ACC championships, two Southern Conference championships, 12 consensus All-Americans, several Hall of Fame inductees, and 28 bowl game appearances. Maryland possesses the third-most ACC championships with nine, which places them behind Clemson and Florida State with 15 each. Many former Terrapins players and coaches have gone on to careers in professional football including 17 first-round NFL Draft picks.

== History ==
=== Early years (1892–1946) ===
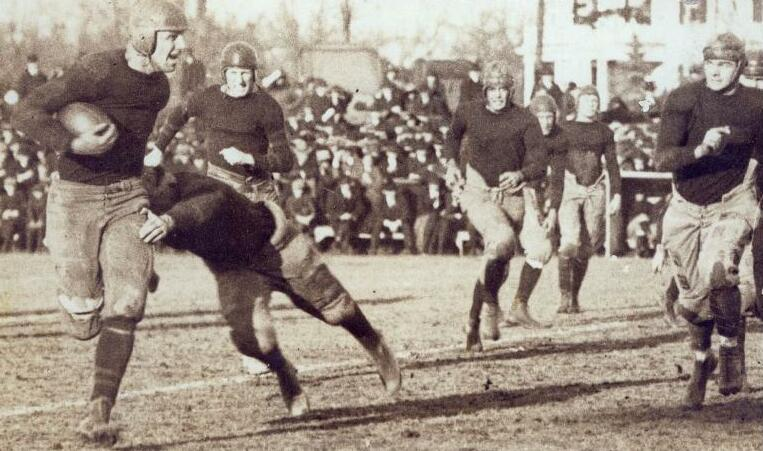
A game between Maryland and intrastate rival Johns Hopkins in 1919.

In 1892, the school then known as the Maryland Agricultural College fielded its first officially-sanctioned college football team. They went scoreless in all three of that season's games, but the following year, posted a perfect record of 6–0. For the first two decades of the program, the team primarily competed against local universities and high schools due to the prohibitive nature of long-distance travel at the time.

In 1911, Harry C. "Curley" Byrd became head coach and held that position for more than two decades until he was named the university president. In 1921, Maryland joined the Southern Conference where it remained for thirty years. Between 1935 and 1946, the school had several coaches that achieved fame elsewhere: Frank Dobson, a former assistant coach under John Heisman; Clark Shaughnessy, architect of Stanford's undefeated 1940 turnaround; and Paul "Bear" Bryant, who later became the long-time Alabama head coach. Bryant resigned after one season when a player he had suspended was reinstated by President Byrd.

=== Jim Tatum era (1947–1955) ===
Jim Tatum was hired in 1947, after a brief stint at Oklahoma where he had led the Sooners to a conference championship in his only season there. He was Maryland's sixth head coach in eight years, but Tatum stayed for nine seasons and became the school's most successful head coach in modern history. During his tenure, he led Maryland to two national championships (one retroactive), three conference championships, three perfect seasons, six top-20 final rankings, and five bowl game appearances. Seven of his players were named first-team All-Americans, including five consensus All-Americans. Under Tatum, Maryland finished every season with a winning record.

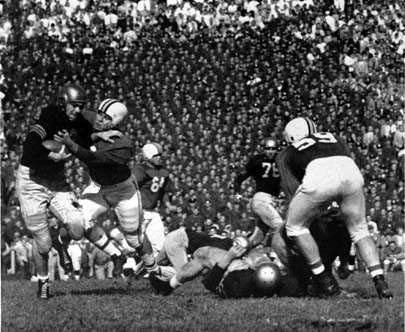
Maryland in action against Navy in 1952.

After the 1947 season, the Terrapins participated in their first bowl game, the 1948 Gator Bowl, in which they tied Georgia, 20–20. NCAA season-scoring leader Lu Gambino recorded all three Maryland touchdowns. In 1949, Maryland again played in the Gator Bowl, where they defeated 20th-ranked Missouri, 20–7. The Terrapins finished the season ranked 14th by the Associated Press. Maryland's current home field, Byrd Stadium (now SECU Stadium), was constructed in 1950, and named in honor of former coach and contemporary Maryland president Curly Byrd. Maryland started the 1950 season ranked 15th and defeated Navy, 35–21, in the Byrd Stadium dedication game.

The Terrapins won the 1951 Southern Conference co-championship alongside the Virginia Military Institute. Their perfect season culminated with an upset over first-ranked Tennessee in the 1952 Sugar Bowl. At the time, however, the wire services released their final rankings before the bowl games, and Maryland finished third in the Associated Press Poll. Several selectors, including analyst Jeff Sagarin, have retroactively credited Maryland with the national championship. In 1953, Maryland and six other schools split from the Southern Conference to form the Atlantic Coast Conference. That year, Maryland shut-out two 11th-ranked teams: Mississippi, 38–0, and Alabama, 21–0, won the ACC co-championship alongside Duke, and were named the national champions as the only undefeated and untied team in the nation. The Terrapins were defeated by fourth-ranked Oklahoma in the Orange Bowl. After the 1955 season, Tatum resigned to return to North Carolina, where he soon died of Rocky Mountain spotted fever.

=== After Tatum (1956–1971) ===
The Terrapins entered 1956 ranked number-six, but after the departure of Tatum, they suffered their first losing season in a decade. It marked the beginning of a long undistinguished period of Maryland history, and between 1956 and 1971, they compiled a record of 50–100–1 and only three winning seasons. In 1967, they suffered their first and only winless season in 75 years. High points during this period included victories over 14th-ranked North Carolina in 1957, 21–7, in which Queen Elizabeth II was in attendance for her first American Football game while she was in Washington, 11th-ranked Clemson in 1959, eighth-ranked 1960 Clemson Tigers football team in 1960, and seventh-ranked Syracuse in 1961. In 1962, assistant coach Lee Corso convinced African-American wide receiver Darryl Hill to transfer from the Naval Academy. Hill broke the color barrier in football at four institutions: Gonzaga High School, the Naval Academy, Maryland, and the ACC. In 1965, back Bob Sullivan led the nation with 10 interceptions.

=== Jerry Claiborne era (1972–1981) ===
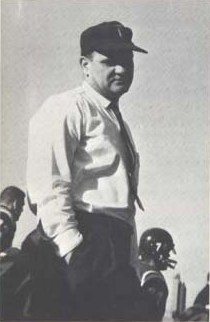
Jerry Claiborne engineered a turnaround of Maryland's fortunes beginning in 1972.

In 1972, Jerry Claiborne took over as head coach of the Terrapins, which had only nine wins in the past five years. In his first season, Maryland improved to 5–5–1, and the following year, they reached their first bowl game in almost two decades. The team steadily improved until his fifth season, 1976, when they finished the regular season with an 11–0 record, their first perfect mark since Tatum's 1955 squad. Boomer Esiason later described Claiborne's coaching style as "vanilla", and said his strategy was "run right, run left, run up the middle, punt, and play good defense." He went on to say, "But, there's no question he made me a tougher player . . . We'd do drills where the quarterback had to take on a linebacker. It was like he had a sign on our back, 'Hit us, we're stupid'. It made you a tougher player."

In 1974, Maryland had a pre-season rank of 14th and later beat 17th-ranked NC State to win the ACC championship. The Terrapins were defeated by 20th-ranked Tennessee in the Liberty Bowl and finished the season ranked 13th. In 1975, Maryland again won the ACC and defeated 13th-ranked Florida in the Gator Bowl to finish 13th in the nation. That season, the Terrapins led the ACC in total offense with 375.2 yards per game. Maryland started 1976 ranked 12th, and quarterback Mark Manges led them to 11 consecutive wins to secure their third straight ACC championship. Maryland's loss to sixth-ranked Houston in the Cotton Bowl, 30–21, ended any hopes for a national championship.

In 1978, Maryland beat 20th-ranked NC State and finished with a ranking of 20th. The game that pitted 11th-ranked Maryland against 12th-ranked Clemson has been described as one of the most exciting games of the era. The "big-play caravan" ultimately saw Clemson triumph, 28–24. From 1974 to 1978, Claiborne and the Terrapins secured five consecutive bowl game berths and three consecutive ACC championships. Maryland made it to a sixth bowl game in 1980. After the 1981 season, Claiborne left the program for his alma mater, Kentucky, and was replaced by Bobby Ross, an assistant coach for the Kansas City Chiefs.

=== Bobby Ross era (1982–1986) ===
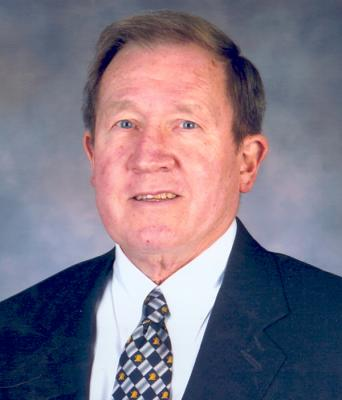
Coach Ross

In a surprising choice, former Maryland assistant coach and Citadel head coach Bobby Ross, who was not a big-name at the time, was selected as head coach in 1982. In contrast to Claiborne's style, Ross implemented a high-powered offense. He replaced the I-veer triple option with an NFL-style offense that emphasized dropback passes, bootlegs, and play action passes. This change in tactics and strategy enabled starting quarterback Boomer Esiason the opportunity to excel to a degree not seen under Claiborne the season prior. Esiason said, "Ross has an uncanny knack of putting players in a position to not only succeed, but to overachieve . . . If he didn't show up at Maryland, I don't know what would have happened to me. I don't know if I would have turned into the player I was and played in the NFL." During this time, several Maryland quarterbacks went on to careers in the National Football League (NFL), and the school was nicknamed "Quarterback U" as a result.

In Ross's inaugural season, Maryland defeated 10th-ranked North Carolina in Chapel Hill, and then edged Miami before their most important conference game of the season against the 1981 national champions, the Clemson Tigers. Between 1974 and 1988, either Clemson or Maryland won the ACC title all but three years. Clemson had lost to the 1980 national champions, seventh-ranked Georgia, 13–7, and tied Boston College, 17–17, after the opposing quarterback, Doug Flutie, led a comeback. Clemson was therefore unable to defend their NCAA championship, but either Clemson or Maryland, with perfect conference records, would secure the ACC title. Thus, decades before the official ACC Championship Game, 1982 saw a rare de facto title match. Clemson scored first, then pulled away 14–7 before half. In the second half, a favorable wind twice yielded Maryland excellent field position, Esiason threw for two rapid-fire touchdowns and a two-point conversion, and the defense held Clemson at bay. However, the Terrapins also turned the ball over five times in the second half and lost, 24–22. With the win, Clemson won the ACC and Maryland finished second. Immediately after the game, the NCAA announced its investigation into Clemson recruiting had found improprieties. As a result, the Tigers were denied a bowl game and television coverage in the following season. The ACC instituted further punishment, making Clemson ineligible for the conference championship for the next two years. Maryland finished 1982 ranked 20th after losing to ninth-ranked Washington in the Aloha Bowl. In 1983, Maryland lost to third-ranked Auburn and 20th-ranked West Virginia, but beat 17th-ranked Pittsburgh and third-ranked North Carolina. Clemson and Maryland once more met with perfect ACC records, and Maryland again lost, this time blown out, 52–27. Despite the loss, Maryland was awarded the conference championship because of the sanctions against Clemson.

In 1984, Maryland defeated the defending national champions, sixth-ranked Miami, in what was then the biggest comeback in college football history and judged by some as the most exciting. At half time, Maryland trailed Miami, 31–0. Back-up quarterback Frank Reich replaced Stan Gelbaugh and proceeded to throw four touchdown passes, and capitalizing on Miami errors, the Terrapins won, 42–40. The recovery from the 31–point halftime deficit stood as the greatest college football comeback for the next 22 years, until the record was finally broken by Michigan State against Northwestern. Reich later repeated the feat in his professional career when he led the Buffalo Bills to overcome a 32-point deficit and set the NFL comeback record. That season, Maryland also defeated 17th-ranked West Virginia in Morgantown and 20th-ranked Clemson at Memorial Stadium in Baltimore to avenge the 1983 loss at Death Valley, and secured the 1984 ACC Championship with a 45–34 victory over arch rival Virginia in Charlottesville. In the postseason, they edged Tennessee, 28–27, in the Sun Bowl and finished 12th in the nation. Maryland entered the 1985 season with a number-one preseason rank, and set its all-time home attendance record in Byrd Stadium with an average of 49,385 over five games. However, they dropped to a ranking of 17th in Week 2, and then out of the polls in Week 4 after a shutout by Michigan. Despite the early setbacks, the Terrapins finished undefeated in six conference games to take the ACC championship for the third consecutive year. Maryland defeated Syracuse, 35–18, in the Cherry Bowl and earned a final ranking of 18th. In 1986, though the Terrapins may have posted a mediocre 5–5–1 record, one of the five losses was to the eventual 1986 National Champion Penn State by 2 points in State College due to a failed 2-point conversion that would have tied the game at 17, and the lone game that ended in a tie was against eventual ACC Champion Clemson at Memorial Stadium in Baltimore.

After the season, Ross resigned as head coach. He expressed frustration over the university's failure to improve Byrd Stadium and its associated facilities. Ross had shown recruits stadium and facility renovation plans as an indication of the program's direction, and when they did not come to fruition, he felt that he had misled the players. Ross also stated that he was hurt by "innuendo, insinuation, and guilt by association" with respect to the cocaine-induced death of Maryland basketball star Len Bias. He said, "I feel the football team has represented the university well, both on and off the field." The athletics department investigation report had commended the propriety of the football program, but university chancellor John B. Slaughter did not offer his vocal support for Ross until a month later.

=== Dark years (1987–2000) ===
Maryland athletics in general were marred by the death of Len Bias, and the football team was no exception. After Ross resigned, offensive coordinator and quarterbacks coach Joe Krivak was promoted to head coach. This was the beginning of a lackluster period for Terrapins football, and Maryland compiled a 55–88 record and one bowl appearance from 1987 to 2000. A controversial loss to Virginia in the final game of 1988 cost the team a sixth win for bowl eligibility. In 1989, Maryland tied Joe Paterno's 13th-ranked Penn State for the only time in the series' existence, after 24 consecutive losses to the Nittany Lions. The following season, the Terrapins beat 25th-ranked West Virginia and upset 8th-ranked Virginia. Maryland received a bowl berth and tied Louisiana Tech in the Independence Bowl, which would be their only postseason appearance during this period. Maryland was plagued by injuries in 1991, and finished with just two wins to nine losses, their worst record in two decades.

After that season, athletic director Andy Geiger fired Krivak, one year after having granted him a five-year contract extension, and hired Holy Cross head coach Mark Duffner as his replacement. Duffner installed a run and shoot offense which shattered many school records, but the defense was notoriously weak. During this time, quarterbacks Scott Milanovich and John Kaleo set numerous school records for passing under Duffner, most of which still stand. In 1993, Maryland earned the dubious honor of most yards allowed per game, a record which still stands. In 11 games, the Terrapins surrendered 6,083 yards—an average of 553.0 yards per game. After that season, Duffner reorganized his staff by firing three assistant coaches, but the team showed little progress in the following years. Duffner was fired after the 1996 season, having accumulated a combined record of 20–35.

Ron Vanderlinden was hired as head coach for the 1997 season under a five-year contract. Vanderlinden had helped engineer turnarounds at Northwestern as defensive coordinator and at Colorado as a defensive assistant. The 1995 Northwestern team in particular had shocked observers when it recorded a 10–2 season and the Big Ten championship. In 1999, Maryland showed its first signs of significant improvement, and a winning season appeared certain when Maryland possessed a 5–2 record. The Terrapins, however, then suffered a three-game losing streak. In their finale against Virginia, the Terrapins needed a win to garner a likely invitation to either the Aloha Bowl or Oahu Bowl, whose chief executive officer was a Maryland alumnus. The Terrapins came from behind and held the lead, 30–27, with 5:18 left to play. They regained possession with 1:40 remaining, but an inexperienced quarterback unintentionally stopped the clock. Virginia recovered the ball on downs and mounted a touchdown drive to win the game and end Maryland's bowl hopes. Despite narrowly missing a winning season, Vanderlinden was granted a two-year contract extension. In 2000, Maryland again fell short of a winning season and bowl game. The Terrapins entered their season closer with a 5–5 record, and again fell, this time in a rout by 24th-ranked Georgia Tech. Vanderlinden was fired the following day.

Despite the failure to deliver a winning season, Vanderlinden did oversee substantive improvement in the program. In 1999, Maryland allowed a conference low of 11 sacks compared with 56 two years prior, and they led the conference in rushing after being ranked last in 1997. In 1998, the Terrapins were one of the most improved teams in defense, scoring defense, passing defense, and rushing. During Vanderlinden's tenure, Maryland also recruited several key players who were instrumental in the team's later success.

=== Ralph Friedgen era (2001–2010) ===
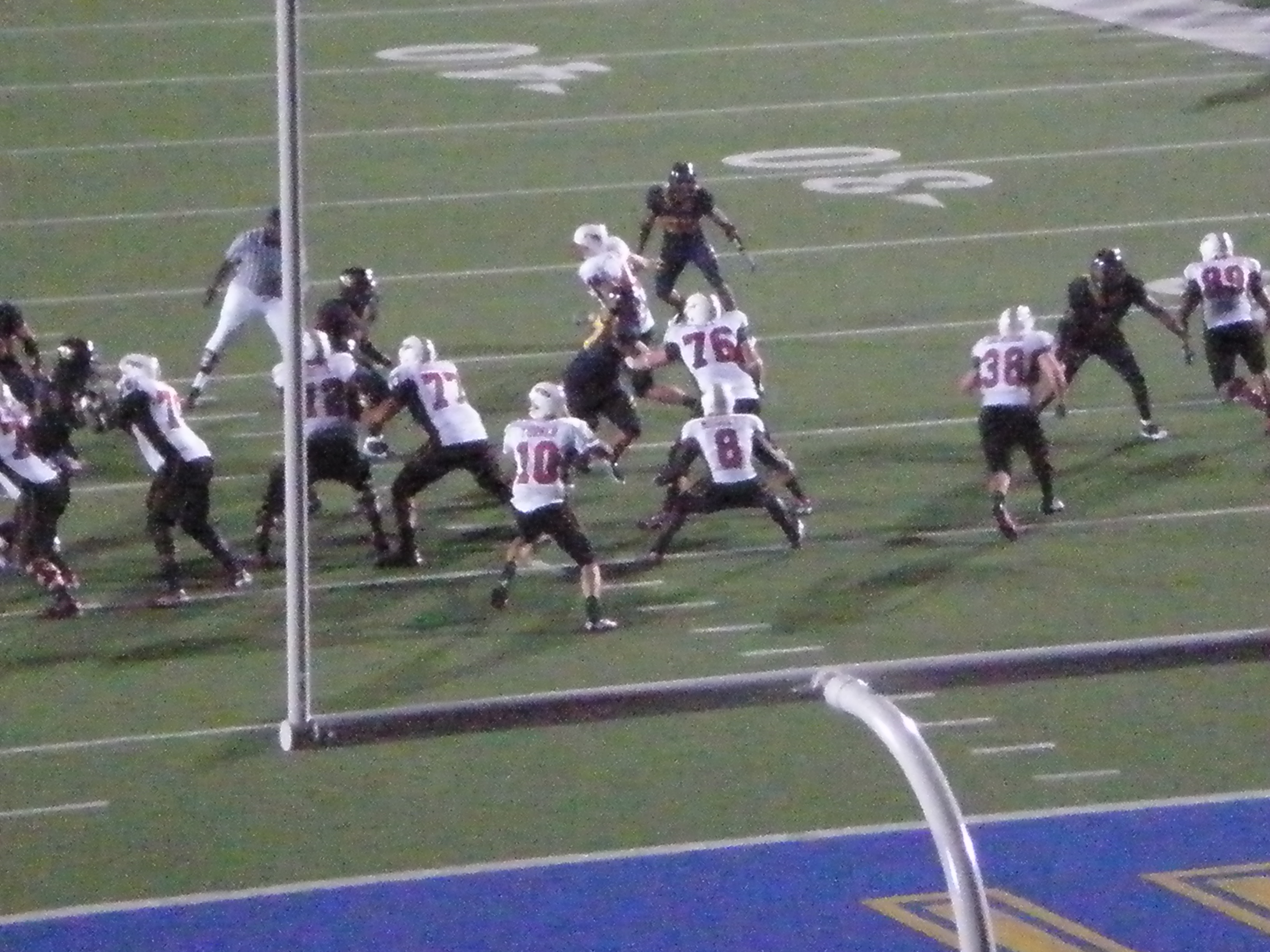
First game of the 2009 season, versus the California Golden Bears

Ralph Friedgen, a former Maryland player and assistant under Bobby Ross, was hired as Vanderlinden's replacement for the 2001 season. Friedgen had previously been denied an interview for the position twice by his alma mater. While offensive coordinator at Georgia Tech, he had been described as an "offensive genius", and Friedgen later received similar plaudits while at Maryland. When he took over, Maryland had not won a bowl game in 16 years and had only one winning season since 1990.

In 2001, Maryland won its first four games and entered the AP Poll for the first time since September 1995. Maryland beat 15th-ranked Georgia Tech in overtime when placekicker Nick Novak, the ACC's future all-time scoring leader, equalized and then won the game with 46- and 26-yard field goals, thereby ensuring a winning season and bowl appearance. In Tallahassee, 18th-ranked Florida State broke a stalemate in the fourth quarter to hand Maryland its only defeat of the regular season, 52–31. Maryland closed the year with a win over NC State, which secured the ACC championship and made the Terrapins the first team other than Florida State to take the title outright since the Seminoles joined the conference in 1991. Sixth-ranked Maryland then faced fifth-ranked Florida in the Orange Bowl—their first-ever BCS appearance, and their first major bowl of any sort since the 1977 Cotton Bowl. The Terrapins lost, 56–23, and finished with a 10–2 record and ranked 10th in the nation.

In 2002, Maryland had a preseason rank of 20th, but their first three games included a shutout by 12th-ranked Notre Dame, 22–0, and a loss to 16th-ranked Florida State, 37–10. The Terrapins rallied to defeat 13th-ranked West Virginia and 17th-ranked NC State, while losing only to Virginia. That loss, however, prevented Maryland from earning a share of the ACC championship alongside Florida State. The Terrapins routed Tennessee in the Peach Bowl, 30–3, and finished with an 11–3 record and final ranking of 18th. Maryland began the 2003 season with losses to Northern Illinois and eighth-ranked Florida State. They later defeated 23rd-ranked West Virginia, but were edged by Georgia Tech. In the postseason, 24th-ranked Maryland delivered a second crushing defeat against 20th-ranked West Virginia in the Gator Bowl, 41–7, and finished the season ranked 17th. The New York Times computer poll ranked Maryland third in the nation, behind only split-national champions Louisiana State and Southern California. The 2004 season was Friedgen's first with a losing record. Maryland finished with a 5–6 mark that included an overtime loss to West Virginia, 19–16. The highlight of the season was an upset victory over fifth-ranked Florida State, which was Maryland's first against the Seminoles and their first win against a top-10 team since 1990 and the first win over a top-10 team at home since 1983. The Terrapins again ended the 2005 season with a 5–6 record. That season opened with a victory over Navy, which was the first meeting between the intrastate foes in 40 years.

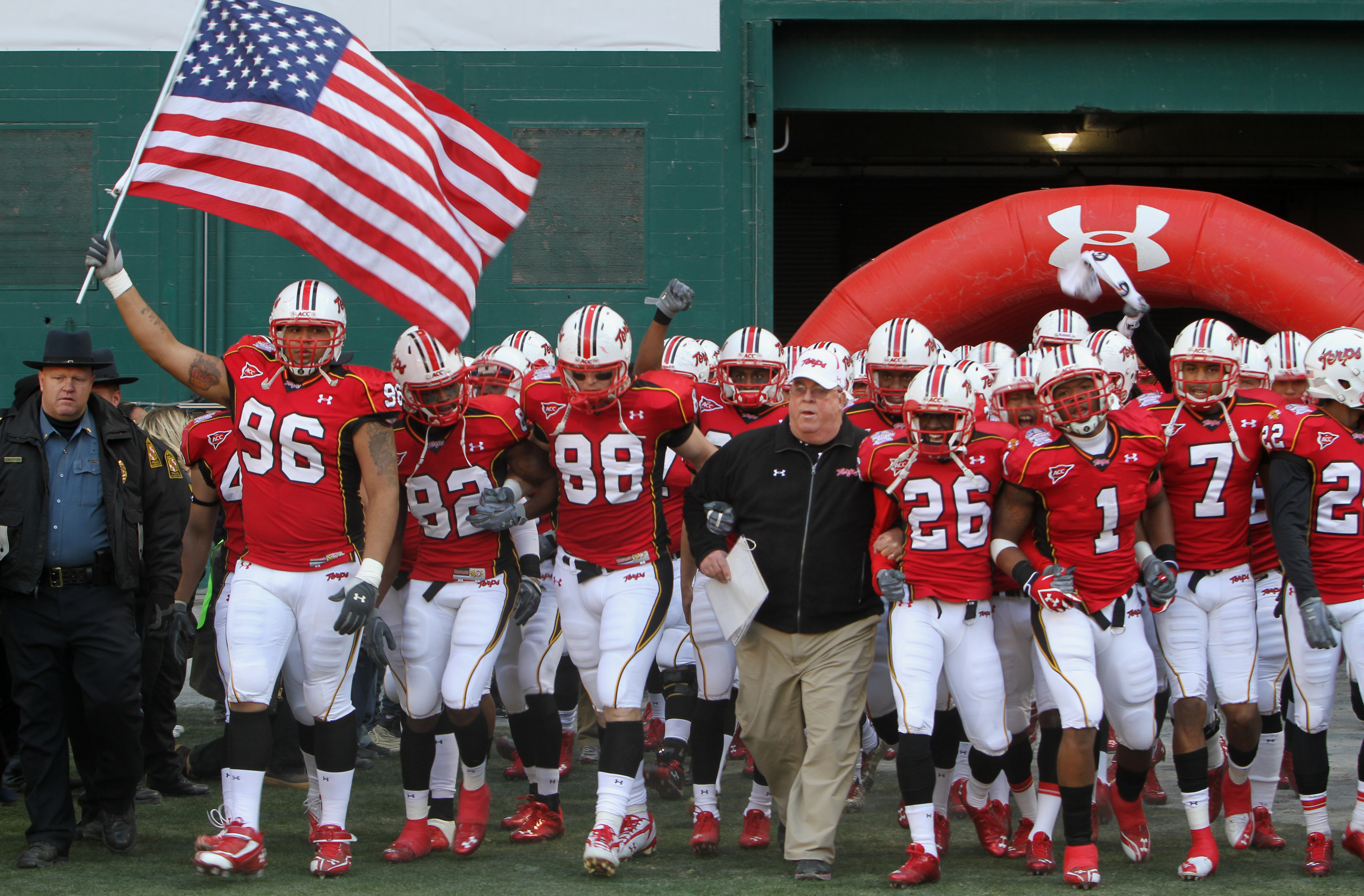
Ralph Friedgen leads his team before his final game, the 2010 Military Bowl.

In 2006, Maryland returned to a bowl game and finished with a 9–4 record. During the season, the Terrapins upset 19th-ranked Clemson, 13–12, and five of their games were won by four points or less. In the Champs Sports Bowl, Maryland beat Purdue, 24–7. In 2007, Maryland overcame extensive injuries to again secure a postseason appearance. During the season, unranked Maryland tallied two shocking upsets against 10th-ranked Rutgers, 34–24, and eighth-ranked Boston College, 42–35. They finished the season with a rout of NC State to attain bowl eligibility, 37–0, but lost to Oregon State in the Emerald Bowl, 21–14. According to the final Sagarin computer-generated rankings, Maryland had the second-hardest schedule in the ACC and the 27th-hardest schedule among Division I teams.

Numerous observers described Maryland's 2008 season as "wildly inconsistent". The Terrapins defeated four of their five ranked opponents—25th-ranked California, 19th-ranked Clemson, 19th-ranked Wake Forest, and 17th-ranked North Carolina—but also lost to heavy underdogs Middle Tennessee and Virginia. Ultimately, Maryland defeated Nevada in the Humanitarian Bowl and finished the season with an 8–5 record. Before the 2009 season, many analysts projected the Terrapins to finish last or second-to-last in the Atlantic Division of the ACC, and expressed particular concern with the inexperienced offensive line. The prognostications proved accurate, and Maryland finished 2–10 for their first ten-loss season in program history. Maryland rebounded in 2010 to finish with a 9–4 record, including a win in the Military Bowl, and ranked 23rd in the AP Poll. The ACC named Friedgen Coach of the Year, while freshman quarterback Danny O'Brien became the first Terrapin ever named ACC Rookie of the Year. Citing lack of fan support, the athletic department bought out the final year of Friedgen's contract for $2 million.

=== Randy Edsall era (2011–2015) ===
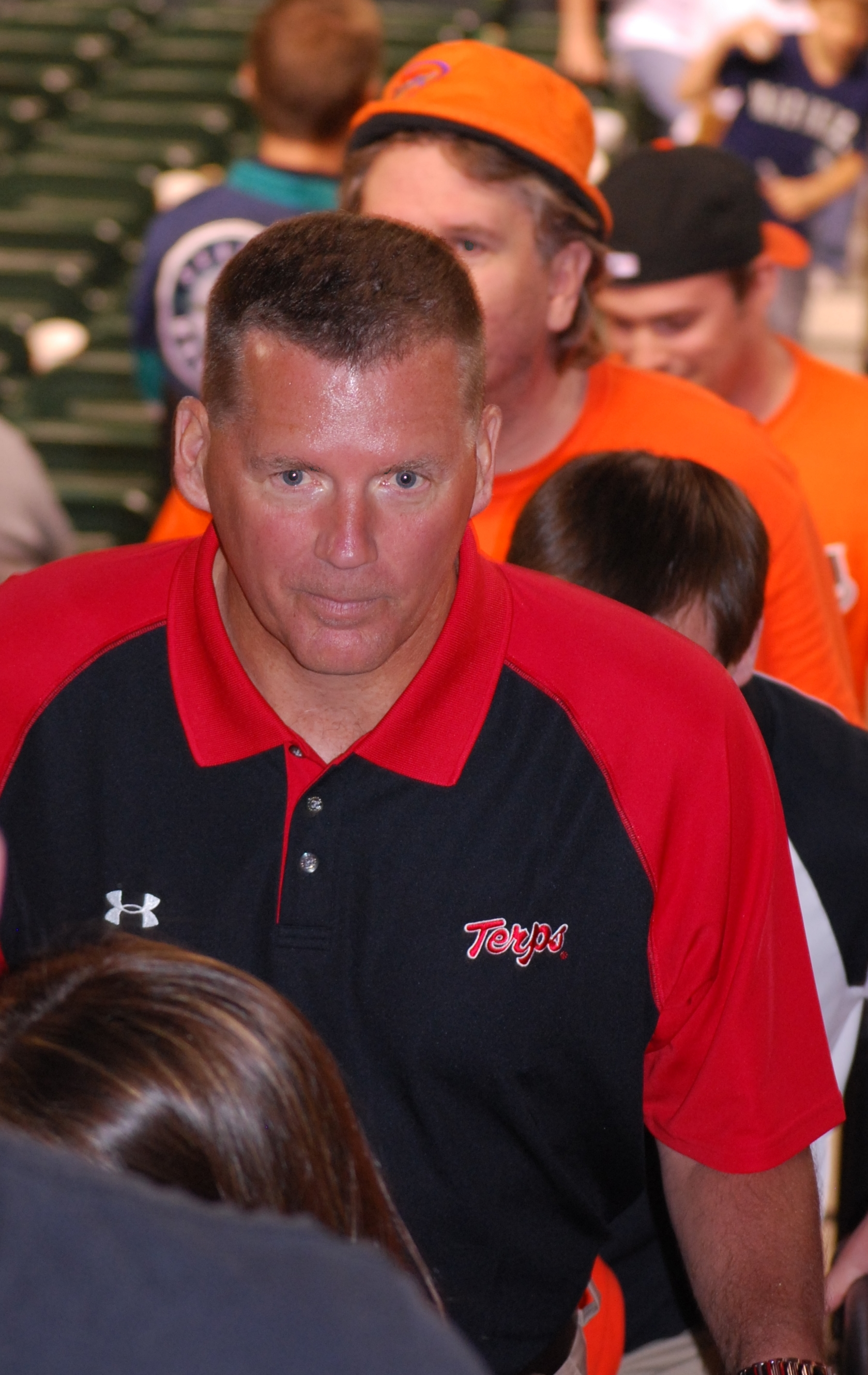
Coach Edsall

After Friedgen was let go, the Terrapins hired Randy Edsall away from Connecticut to be Maryland's head coach. The 2011 season was not a successful one for Maryland. Also for the 2011 season, Edsall removed the players' Surnames from the back of their jerseys for the first time since the late 1970's and continued Coach Friedgen's Homecoming tradition of wearing the regular Red home jerseys and Red pants. After a nationally televised win over Miami, the Terrapins struggled for the remainder of the season. They only managed to record one more win (against FCS opponent Towson) and finished with a 2–10 record and 1-7 record in Atlantic Coast Conference play. The team did attract national attention for its "Maryland Pride" uniforms that were created by Under Armour, who had become the official outfitter of the Maryland Athletic Department in September 2008.

After the 2011 season, Edsall fired both his offensive coordinator Gary Crowton and his defensive coordinator Todd Bradford. Mike Locksley, who had been fired in 2011 from his head coaching position at New Mexico, was hired to be the new offensive coordinator. Locksley had previously worked at Maryland under head coaches Vanderlinden and Friedgen, and was the recruiting coordinator for Maryland before and during the three consecutive 10+ win seasons under Friedgen. Brian Stewart, who had been the defensive coordinator for the Houston Cougars, was hired to replace Bradford as the new defensive coordinator.

Edsall's 2012 team compiled a 4–8 overall record and 2-6 record in conference play, losing four quarterbacks to injury, and eventually starting a linebacker at the position. In 2012, the Terps revamped their regular uniforms as Coach Edsall returned the players' Surnames to the back of the Jerseys and debuted 3 new variations of the "Maryland Pride" uniforms, a gray and white version called "White Ops" worn on the road, an all-black combination called "Black Ops" worn at home and a new variation of the Maryland Pride uniforms. The team's record improved from 2011 nonetheless but still not as much as fans, alumni and the administration had hoped.

The 2013 Maryland Terrapins football team under head coach Edsall improved to 7–6, capping the season with a loss in the Military Bowl to Marshall, The 61st and final season the Terrapins would be playing football in the Atlantic Coast Conference.

Edsall's 2014 Terps finished their regular season with a 7–5 record, comprising a 4–4 record in Big Ten Conference play that put them third in the Big Ten East Division, their Inaugural season in the Big Ten Conference. Maryland ended its season at the Foster Farms Bowl, where it lost to Stanford.

On October 11, 2015, Edsall was relieved of his duties with offensive coordinator Mike Locksley named as the interim head coach for the rest of the 2015 season.

=== D. J. Durkin era (2016–2018) ===
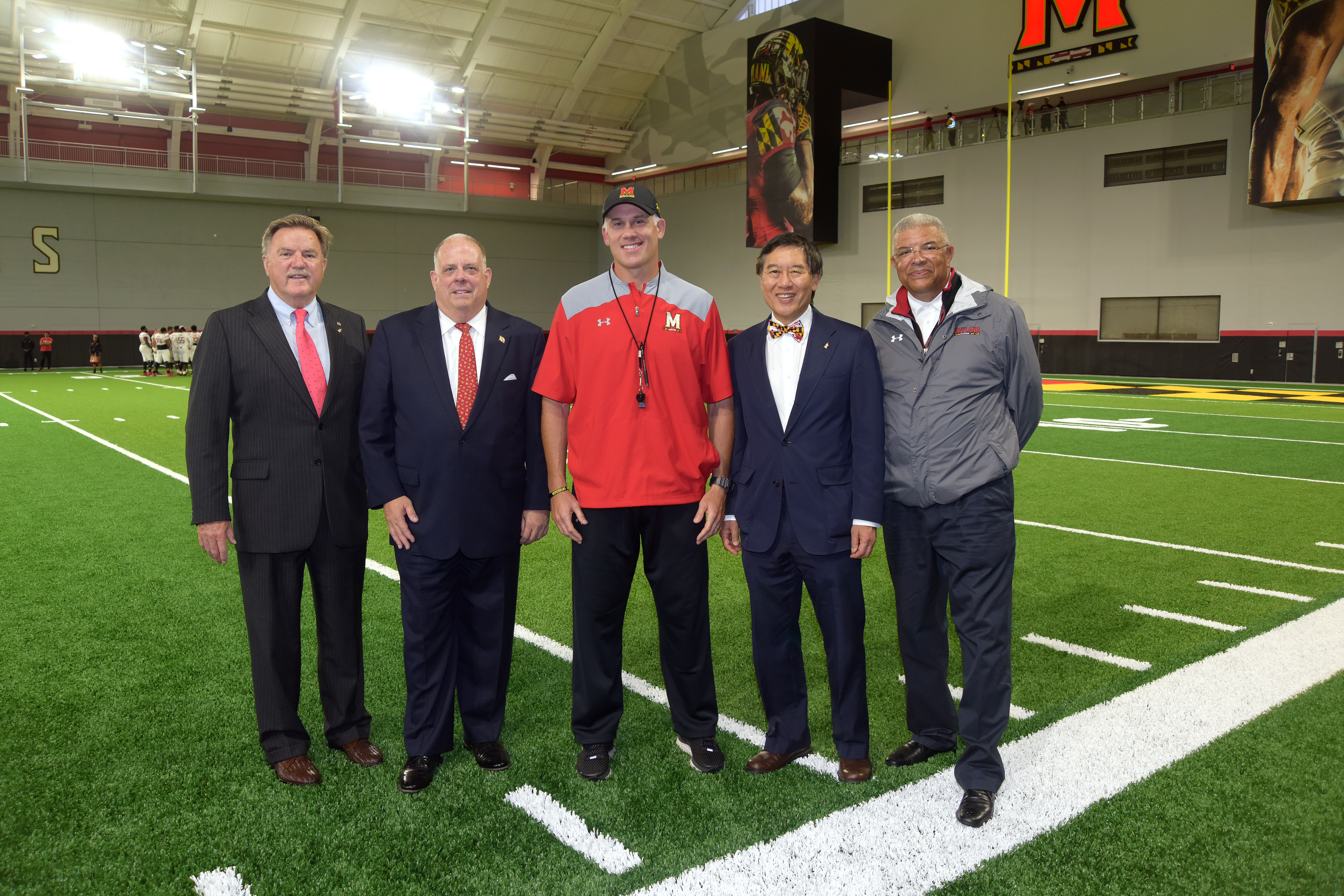
L–R: Unnamed official, Maryland Gov. Hogan, Durkin, UofM Pres. Loh, and AD Anderson during Hogan's visit in 2017, photographed by Tom Nappi at Cole Field House.

On December 2, 2015, the Terps announced the hiring of former Michigan defensive coordinator D. J. Durkin as head coach. Durkin had never before worked as a full-time head coach, though he coached the Florida Gators on an interim basis in the 2015 Birmingham Bowl.

In 2016, Durkin coached the Terrapins to a 6–7 record including a bowl loss. Maryland finished 4-8 and was ineligible for a bowl game in 2017. During the 2018 offseason, football player Jordan McNair died from an apparent heat stroke after a practice. Following McNair's death and news reports that players "faced abuse and disparagement" from football staff, Durkin was placed on administrative leave on August 11, just weeks before the start of the 2018 season. One of those football staffers Rick Court, one of Durkin's first hires and the strength and conditioning coach, was dismissed from Maryland due to sources describing his abusive training methods. Offensive coordinator Matt Canada, in his first season with Maryland, was named interim head coach. The UM Board of Regents recommended that Durkin stay as head coach after a report was released. However, due to intense backlash Durkin was fired as head coach on October 31, 2018.

=== Mike Locksley era (2019–2026) ===
On December 4, 2018, Maryland hired Alabama offensive coordinator Mike Locksley as their new head coach. Locksley, a D.C. native and former Maryland assistant, previously served as interim head coach of the Terrapins for their final 6 games in 2015 after Randy Edsall's firing. Locksley is known for his impressive recruiting ability, and has made an effort to keep many of them talented players that go to high school in the DMV in the area by convincing them to come to UMD.

The Locksley era at Maryland had an impressive offensive start with the Terps scoring 142 points in the 2019 campaign. In its first game, Maryland defeated FCS Howard University 79-0 and then dominated 21st ranked Syracuse University 63-20. The 142 points in its first two games marked the Terps highest-ever scoring output in consecutive games. The 63 points against Syracuse were the most points scored against a ranked opponent by any Maryland football team ever. Despite the excitement surrounding the undefeated and 21st ranked team in the country, the Terrapins suffered a disappointing loss to the unranked Temple Owls. After a strong start, the only other win in the season came against Rutgers, and the Terrapins would ultimately finish 3-9. In 2020, the Terps played in a shortened season due to the COVID-19 pandemic playing only 5 games, all against teams from the Big Ten, finishing with an overall record of 2-3 and briefly paused operations in the middle of the season due to several players and staff getting diagnosed with symptoms of the virus. The two victories came against Minnesota at home in College Park on Friday, October 30th and on the road in State College, Pennsylvania against Penn State on November 7th.

In 2023, The Terrapins again won 8 games, jumping out to a 5 and 0 record before losing 4 straight, including a close loss to #1 Michigan. In the final regular season game against Rutgers, Maryland's quarterback Taulia Tagovailoa threw for 298 yards in the first half of the game, becoming the Big Ten's all time passing leader. Maryland capped the season with a dominant 31 to 13 win against Auburn, jumping out to a 21 to 0 lead in the first quarter, with the season's backup quarterbacks playing as Taulia Tagovailoa sat the game out.

== Conference affiliations ==
Maryland has affiliated with various conferences as well as being an independent.

- Independent (1892–1893)
- Maryland Intercollegiate Football Association (1894, 1896–1897)
- Independent (1898–1916)
- South Atlantic Intercollegiate Athletic Association (1917–1921)
- Southern Conference (1922–1951)
- Independent (1952)
- Atlantic Coast Conference (1953–2013)
- Big Ten Conference (2014–present)

== Championships ==
=== National championships ===
Maryland was selected national champions by NCAA-designated major selectors in both 1951 and 1953. Maryland claims the 1953 national championship.

| Year | Coach | Selectors | Record | Bowl | Result | Final AP | Final Coaches |
|---|---|---|---|---|---|---|---|
| 1953 | Jim Tatum | Associated Press, United Press, International News Service | 10–1 | Orange Bowl | L 0–7 | No. 1 | No. 1 |

=== Conference championships ===
Maryland has won 11 conference championships in two conferences as of the 2017 season, eight outright and three shared.

| Year | Coach | Conference | Overall record | Conference record |
|---|---|---|---|---|
| 1937 | Frank Dobson | Southern Conference | 8–2 | 2–0 |
| 1951† | Jim Tatum | Southern Conference | 10–0 | 5–0 |
| 1953† | Jim Tatum | Atlantic Coast Conference | 10–1 | 3–0 |
| 1955† | Jim Tatum | Atlantic Coast Conference | 10–1 | 4–0 |
| 1974 | Jerry Claiborne | Atlantic Coast Conference | 8–4 | 6–0 |
| 1975 | Jerry Claiborne | Atlantic Coast Conference | 9–2–1 | 5–0 |
| 1976 | Jerry Claiborne | Atlantic Coast Conference | 11–1 | 5–0 |
| 1983 | Bobby Ross | Atlantic Coast Conference | 8–4 | 6–0 |
| 1984 | Bobby Ross | Atlantic Coast Conference | 9–3 | 6–0 |
| 1985 | Bobby Ross | Atlantic Coast Conference | 9–3 | 6–0 |
| 2001 | Ralph Friedgen | Atlantic Coast Conference | 10–2 | 7–1 |

† Co-champions

== Head coaches ==
There have been 39 head coaches of the Maryland football team, 3 of whom have served in multiple tenures. Aazaar Abdul-Rahim is currently the interim head coach.

| No. | Coach | Tenure | Record | Pct. |
|---|---|---|---|---|
| 1 | William W. Skinner | 1892 | 0–3 | .000 |
| 2 | Samuel Harding | 1893 | 6–0 | 1.000 |
| 3 | J. G. Bannon | 1894 | 4–3 | .571 |
| 4 | Grenville Lewis | 1896 | 6–2–2 | .700 |
| 5 | John Lillibridge | 1897 | 2–4 | .333 |
| 6 | Frank Kenly | 1898 | 2–5–1 | .313 |
| 7 | S. S. Cooke | 1899 | 1–4 | .200 |
| 8 | F. H. Peters | 1900 | 3–4–1 | .438 |
| 9 | Emmons Dunbar | 1901 | 1–7 | .125 |
| 10 | D. John Markey | 1902–1904 | 12–13–4 | .483 |
| 11 | Fred K. Nielsen | 1905–1906 | 11–7 | .611 |
| 12 | Charles W. Melick | 1907 | 3–6 | .333 |
| 13 | William Lang | 1908 | 3–8 | .273 |
| 14 | William Lang & Edward Larkin | 1909 | 2–5 | .286 |
| 15 | Royal Alston | 1910 | 4–3–1 | .563 |
| 16 | Charley Donnelly | 1911 | 2–4–2 | .375 |
| 17 | Curley Byrd | 1911–1934 | 119–82–15 | .586 |
| 18, 20 | Jack Faber | 1935, 1940–1941 | 12–13–4 | .483 |
| 19 | Frank Dobson | 1936–1939 | 18–21 | .462 |
| 21, 24 | Clark Shaughnessy | 1942, 1946 | 10–8 | .556 |
| 22 | Clarence Spears | 1943–1944 | 5–12–1 | .306 |
| 23 | Bear Bryant | 1945 | 6–2–1 | .722 |
| 25 | Jim Tatum | 1947–1955 | 73–15–4 | .815 |
| 26 | Tommy Mont | 1956–1958 | 11–18–1 | .383 |
| 27 | Tom Nugent | 1959–1965 | 36–34 | .514 |
| 28 | Lou Saban | 1966 | 4–6 | .400 |
| 29 | Bob Ward | 1967–1968 | 2–17 | .105 |
| 30 | Roy Lester | 1969–1971 | 7–25 | .219 |
| 31 | Jerry Claiborne | 1972–1981 | 77–37–3 | .671 |
| 32 | Bobby Ross | 1982–1986 | 39–19–1 | .669 |
| 33 | Joe Krivak | 1987–1991 | 20–34–2 | .375 |
| 34 | Mark Duffner | 1992–1996 | 20–35 | .364 |
| 35 | Ron Vanderlinden | 1997–2000 | 15–29 | .341 |
| 36 | Ralph Friedgen | 2001–2010 | 75–50 | .600 |
| 37 | Randy Edsall | 2011–2015 | 22–34 | .393 |
| Int. | Mike Locksley† | 2015 | 1–5 | .167 |
| 38 | D.J. Durkin | 2016–2018 | 10–15 | .400 |
| Int. | Matt Canada† | 2018 | 5–7 | .417 |
| 39 | Mike Locksley | 2015†, 2019–2026 | 39–54 | .419 |
| Int. | Aazaar Abdul-Rahim† | 2026–present | 0–0 | – |

† Interim/acting head coach

- No team (1895)

== Bowl games ==
Maryland has qualified for 30 bowl games, with the Terrapins holding a record of 14–14–2.

| Season | Coach | Bowl | Opponent | Result |
|---|---|---|---|---|
| 1947 | Jim Tatum | Gator Bowl | Georgia | T 20–20 |
| 1949 | Jim Tatum | Gator Bowl | Missouri | W 20–7 |
| 1951 | Jim Tatum | Sugar Bowl | Tennessee | W 28–13 |
| 1953 | Jim Tatum | Orange Bowl | Oklahoma | L 0–7 |
| 1955 | Jim Tatum | Orange Bowl | Oklahoma | L 6–20 |
| 1973 | Jerry Claiborne | Peach Bowl | Georgia | L 16–17 |
| 1974 | Jerry Claiborne | Liberty Bowl | Tennessee | L 3–7 |
| 1975 | Jerry Claiborne | Gator Bowl | Florida | W 13–0 |
| 1976 | Jerry Claiborne | Cotton Bowl Classic | Houston | L 21–30 |
| 1977 | Jerry Claiborne | Hall of Fame Classic | Minnesota | W 17–7 |
| 1978 | Jerry Claiborne | Sun Bowl | Texas | L 0–42 |
| 1980 | Jerry Claiborne | Tangerine Bowl | Florida | L 20–35 |
| 1982 | Bobby Ross | Aloha Bowl | Washington | L 20–21 |
| 1983 | Bobby Ross | Florida Citrus Bowl | Tennessee | L 23–30 |
| 1984 | Bobby Ross | Sun Bowl | Tennessee | W 28–27 |
| 1985 | Bobby Ross | Cherry Bowl | Syracuse | W 35–18 |
| 1990 | Joe Krivak | Independence Bowl | Louisiana Tech | T 34–34 |
| 2001 | Ralph Friedgen | Orange Bowl | Florida | L 23–56 |
| 2002 | Ralph Friedgen | Peach Bowl | Tennessee | W 30–3 |
| 2003 | Ralph Friedgen | Gator Bowl | West Virginia | W 41–7 |
| 2006 | Ralph Friedgen | Champs Sports Bowl | Purdue | W 24–7 |
| 2007 | Ralph Friedgen | Emerald Bowl | Oregon State | L 14–21 |
| 2008 | Ralph Friedgen | Humanitarian Bowl | Nevada | W 42–35 |
| 2010 | Ralph Friedgen | Military Bowl | East Carolina | W 51–20 |
| 2013 | Randy Edsall | Military Bowl | Marshall | L 20–31 |
| 2014 | Randy Edsall | Foster Farms Bowl | Stanford | L 21–45 |
| 2016 | D. J. Durkin | Quick Lane Bowl | Boston College | L 30–36 |
| 2021 | Mike Locksley | Pinstripe Bowl | Virginia Tech | W 54–10 |
| 2022 | Mike Locksley | Duke's Mayo Bowl | NC State | W 16–12 |
| 2023 | Mike Locksley | Music City Bowl | Auburn | W 31–13 |

== Home stadium ==
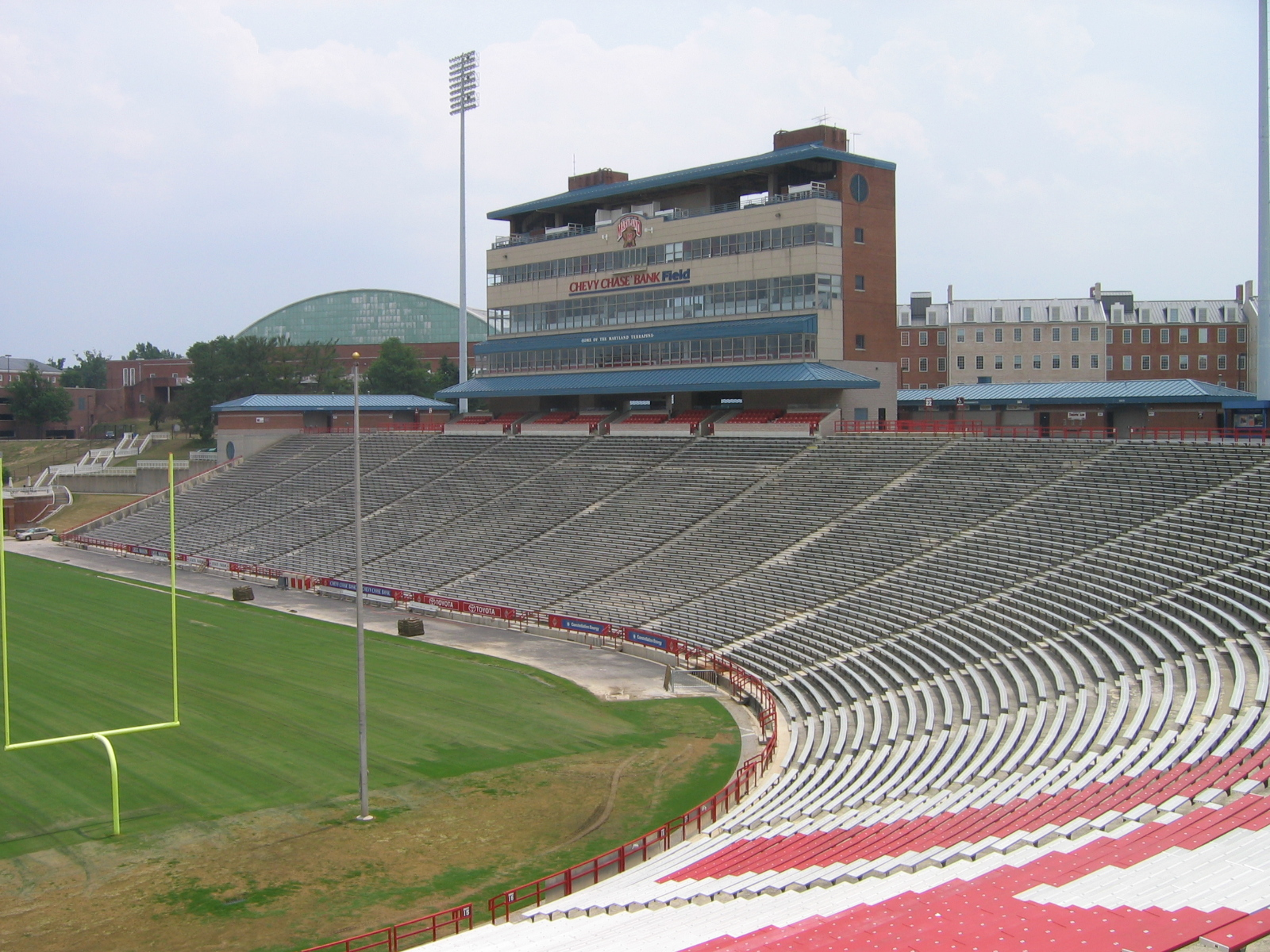
A view of Maryland Stadium showing the old (since replaced) Tyser Tower suites (center). Former basketball arena Cole Field House is in the distance (left).

During its first few decades, the football program had only one poorly suited athletic field on which to play and practice and had no dedicated facilities such as locker rooms. Former coach and contemporary university president Dr. Harry C. Byrd allocated funds for the construction of a stadium in 1915, and it was completed in 1923. The Board of Regents voted to name it Byrd Stadium in honor of its main advocate. The stadium's capacity was 5,000. During this time, it was common for Maryland to play its better-drawing games in larger stadiums in Washington, D.C., or Baltimore.

In 1950, that small field was replaced by the identically named but much larger Byrd Stadium, which was constructed at the cost of $1 million. The new stadium had an initial capacity of 34,680, which has since been upgraded to 51,055 through extensive additions. Shortly after its construction, the stadium hosted its dedication game against Navy, which Maryland won 35–21. That same year, the new field held its first and only bowl game, the Presidential Cup Bowl, which featured Texas A&M and Georgia. In 2006, the University of Maryland became the first school to sell naming rights to its field. The home field was officially branded "Chevy Chase Bank Field at Byrd Stadium" in a 25-year, $20 million contract. In 2008, Chevy Chase Bank was bought out by Capital One, and the stadium was renamed Capital One Field at Byrd Stadium. On December 11, 2015, the Board of Regents voted 12–5 to remove the "Byrd" from the stadium's name because of Harry "Curley" Byrd's segregationist history, renaming it Maryland Stadium for the time being.

== Practice facility ==
The Maryland Terrapins football team practices in Jones-Hill House, the 160,000-square-foot (15,000 m^{2}) indoor practice complex and football operations center that opened in August 2017. The facility features a full-length, 100-yard-long FieldTurf football field with a goal post at each end surrounded by an elevated concourse. With a nearly 90-foot (27 m) height clearance from the field to the center of the roof, the facility ranks among the highest headrooms in any NCAA practice facility. When completed in 2019, the facility will include two full-length outdoor football practice fields, locker rooms, a 26,000-square-foot (2,400 m^{2}) strength and conditioning center, hydrotherapy and other training facilities, a theater-style team meeting room, position meeting rooms, a 230-seat cafeteria, and staff offices for the school's football program. A tunnel will connect the Jones-Hill House to SECU Stadium.

== Traditions ==
=== Nickname ===
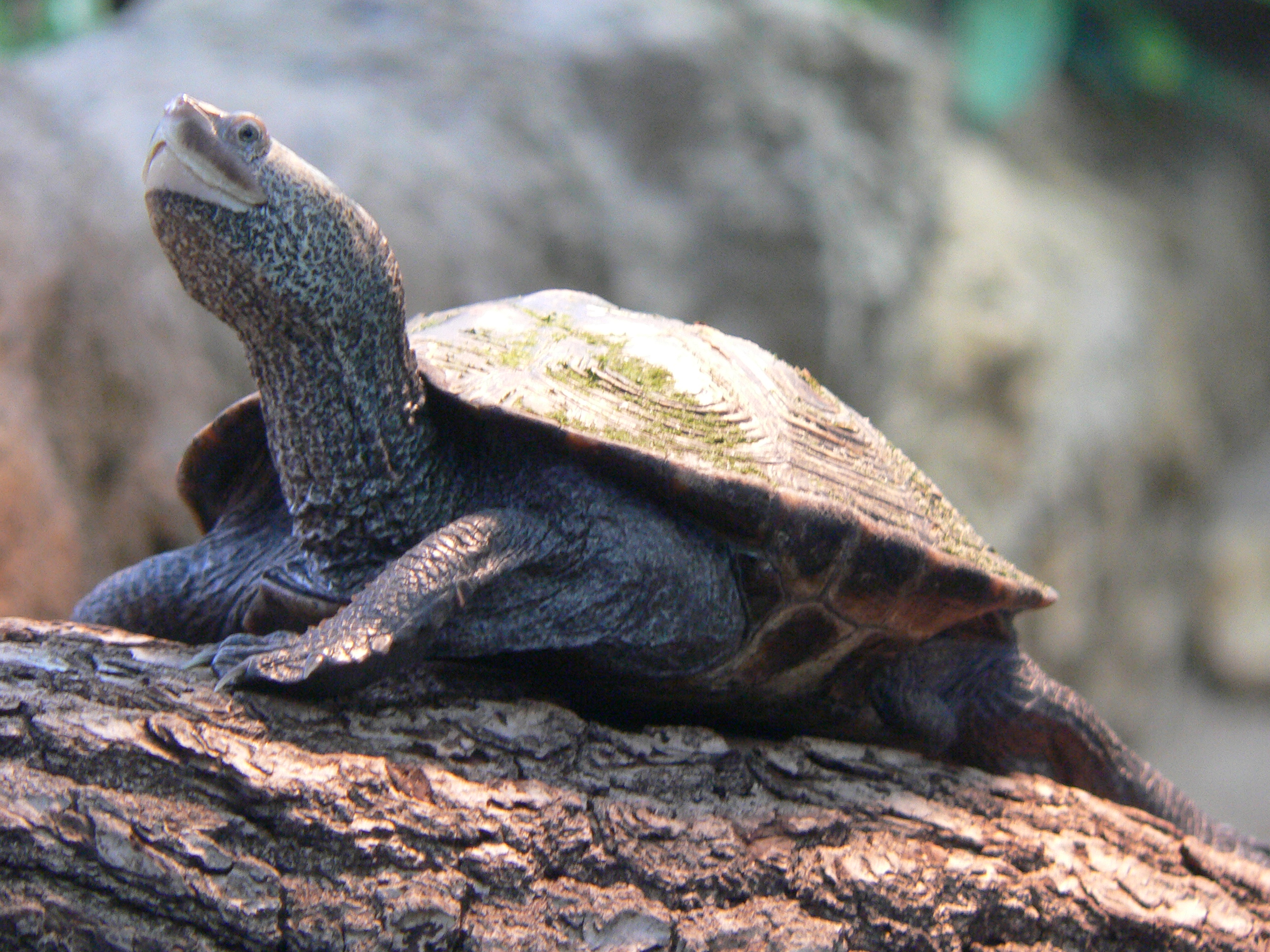
The diamondback terrapin is a turtle species native to Maryland.

When the school was known as the Maryland Agricultural College, from 1856 to 1916, the media called the athletics teams the "Farmers" and the "Aggies". As the University of Maryland, the teams became known as "The Old Liners" in reference to the state nickname. During the 1923 season, The New York Times referred to Maryland as the Orioles, after a bird species endemic to the region that was already the namesake for several baseball teams. In 1932, Curley Byrd suggested that the namesake become the diamondback terrapin (Malaclemys terrapin), a species of land-dwelling turtle common throughout the state, particularly the Chesapeake Bay area where Dr. Byrd spent his early life. The student newspaper had already been named The Diamondback since 1921, and the athletics teams were sometimes referred to as the "Terrapins" as early as 1928. Newspapers began referring to the team simply as the "Terps" to shorten headlines. The truncated name stuck and is now in official use by the school.

The mascot is a diamondback terrapin named Testudo, which means "turtle" in Latin. It is also the name of an ancient Roman military tactic, in which soldiers protected their infantry square from projectiles by completely enclosing it with their shields. Derivations of the word have also been used in scientific nomenclature related to the reptile, such as the order Testudine and the family Testudinidae. In 1933, the graduating class raised funds for a 300-pound bronze replica of a terrapin. It was initially placed in front of Ritchie Coliseum, which was then the home arena of the basketball team. In 1951, after being the subject of numerous pranks, the statue was relocated to Maryland Stadium, reinforced with 700 pounds of concrete, and anchored with steel rods. It was moved again in the 1960s, in front of McKeldin Library, and a second replica was placed at Maryland Stadium in 1992. In the 2000s, under coach Ralph Friedgen, it was a pregame tradition for the football players to walk 200 yards, through what is known as "Terp Alley", to the locker rooms, and touch the bronze Testudo statue.

=== Colors ===
The Maryland state flag

Originally, the athletic teams had no official colors and often used gray or maroon and gray for their uniforms. Senior classes would sometimes select colors of their own choosing. In modern times, the uniforms have been based on some combination of the four colors of the Maryland flag: red, white, black, and gold. The dominant colors have occasionally changed back and forth with changes of the head coach. In 1904, Maryland adopted a state flag based on the heraldry of Lord Calvert: the Calvert family arms (black and gold) quartered with his mother's Crossland family arms (red and white). From the early 1920s until 1942, the black and gold were adopted as the official school colors.

In 1942, Clark Shaughnessy left Stanford to coach at Maryland. He brought with him an affinity for a red and white color scheme and changed the team's uniforms. Shaughnessy left after one season, and the school switched back to the more traditional black and gold. He returned in 1946 and again changed the colors to red and white. When Jim Tatum replaced him the following season, Shaughnessy's colors were retained. In 1961, Maryland wore gold jerseys with black numerals for the first time since 1945 for their season opener against Southern Methodist. In 1987, Joe Krivak introduced black jerseys with the Maryland flag on the sleeves for selected games and then black pants followed in 1991. Ron Vanderlinden took over in 1997 and a new black and white uniform was adopted. Under Ralph Friedgen, Maryland returned to red and white in 2001, with black uniforms being reserved for select games. Maryland was one of the first schools to utilize the "blackout" concept, where fans uniformly wear the color to stand out in the stadium. It was introduced unofficially as the "Byrd Blackout" in 2005. For the 2011 season, Maryland wore new Under Armour uniforms that offered a "dizzying array" of combinations in the four school colors. In the season opener against Miami, the Terrapins unveiled a unique uniform based on the Maryland state flag that received nationwide media attention. In recent years since 2001 under Ralph Friedgen and continued by Randy Edsall, Maryland has worn a uniform combination of all-red, red jerseys and red pants for the annual game on homecoming weekend.

== Rivalries ==
=== Navy ===
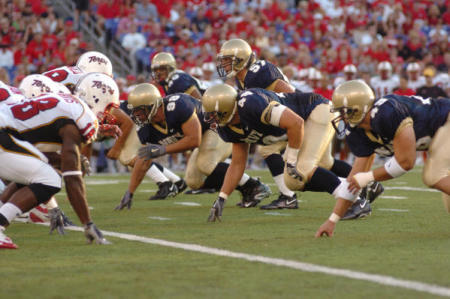
Maryland and Navy resumed competition in 2005 after a 40-year hiatus.

Maryland played the Naval Academy, which is also located in the state of Maryland, several times between the 1930s and 1960s. The rivalry is known as the Crab Bowl Classic. In 1964, an incident in which a Terrapins player flashed an obscene gesture prompted Navy officials to suspend the series for 40 years. They resumed play in 2005. As of 2010, the winner of the Crab Bowl Classic is awarded the Crab Bowl Trophy.

=== Penn State ===
Maryland and Penn State have met 45 times as of 2021. Although Penn State leads the series with a lopsided 41–3–1 record against Maryland, many of those games were decided by field goals and turnovers. Because Maryland was in the ACC before joining the Big Ten Conference in July 2014, this rivalry was mainly kept alive through recruiting. The teams seldom played each other while Maryland was in the ACC but they competed in recruiting in the Baltimore-Washington metropolitan area and Delaware Valley. The teams met in State College on November 1, 2014, for the first time in 21 years. Maryland defeated Penn State 20–19, and at the conclusion of the game, Randy Edsall finished his interview by saying "You know what? Let the rivalry begin". The following year, the rivalry game was played at M&T Bank Stadium in Baltimore, Penn State defeated Maryland 31–30. In 2016, the Terrapins lost in a blowout in State College, after keeping it close for most of the first half, the Nittany Lions shut Maryland out in the final 30 minutes to cruise to a 38–14 win. Maryland hosted No. 12 Penn State in the final game of the 2017 season. The Nittany Lions scored on their opening possession and never looked back, leading 31–0 at the break. Penn State would score on their first three possessions in the second half, making the score 52–0. Maryland would get on the board on their next possession, kicking a field goal with 1:28 remaining in the 3rd making the score 52-3 Penn State. The Lions would go on to win by 63 points, defeating Maryland 66–3 tying the most lopsided win in the series dating back to 1993 when the Lions won 70–7. The matchup in 2018 saw the Lions extend their winning streak to 4 games defeating Maryland 38–3 on a soggy November afternoon at Beaver Stadium. The most recent matchup occurred Saturday November 7, 2020, at Beaver Stadium in State College. Maryland was coming off a thrilling OT homecoming win against Minnesota, and Penn State was looking to bounce back after a loss against No. 3 Ohio State. However, powered by transfer QB Taulia Tagovailoa, it was Maryland who was able to capitalize on the momentum, winning 35–19 against Penn State on their own turf. But the next year Penn State got their revenge on Maryland and Taulia Tagovailoa by beating them on Maryland's turf 31 to 14. Maryland's most recent matchup was on 11/12/22 at Beaver Stadium in State College, where Penn State won in a 0–30 rout.

=== Rutgers ===
Before both Maryland and Rutgers joined the Big Ten, the two schools played each other in nonconference play nine times between 1920 and 2009, with Maryland holding a 5-4 record. When both schools joined the Big Ten in 2014, they were placed in the Big Ten's newly formed East Division.

In seven of the 10 years in the Big Ten East era (2014–23), Rutgers and Maryland played each other the final week of the season. Through 2025, Maryland leads the rivalry 12-9, with a 7-5 record in the Big Ten, while Rutegrs has won the previous two match ups. In 2016, Rutgers Athletic Director Patrick E. Hobbs and then-coach Chris Ash told reporters the schools had "initial conversations with Maryland" to create a trophy, but no trophy has been created to date.

The expanded 18-member Big Ten eliminated the divisional format in 2024 and introduced the Flex Protect XVIII model. The conference designated Maryland-Rutgers as one of 12 protected annual matchups through at least the 2028 season.

=== Virginia ===
The Maryland–Virginia football rivalry was a designated official ACC cross-divisional series when Maryland was an ACC member and the teams have a long-standing rivalry due to proximity and history. The programs also vie for recruits in the same region, and more recently, an additional factor has been the schools' academic competition. Maryland and Virginia have occasionally served as spoilers for one another by precluding a championship or bowl game appearance. When Maryland moved out of the ACC in 2014 and into the Big Ten, the future of this series was put into question. On January 12, 2017, the schools jointly announced a home-home series would be played during the 2023 and 2024 seasons.

=== West Virginia ===
West Virginia and Maryland have met 53 times as of 2021. since their first game in 1919. The Maryland-West Virginia rivalry had a chance of becoming an annual game with West Virginia potentially joining the ACC in 2012, but the Mountaineers wound up joining the Big 12 Conference. In 2001, both programs hired new head coaches, with West Virginia being taken over by Rich Rodriguez. Owing to their proximity, the schools regularly raid their opponent's recruiting areas. The long-running series was put on hiatus for the 2008 and 2009 seasons when Maryland played a home-and-home series against the California Golden Bears, but resumed in 2010. The series ran for five straight seasons from 2010, meeting twice in College Park, twice in Morgantown, and once at M&T Bank Stadium in Baltimore for a neutral site game. The series was on hiatus, but it resumed on September 4, 2021, when Maryland beat West Virginia 30-24 at Maryland Stadium.

== Individual honors ==
Over the years, many Maryland players have received All-American honors. Eleven Terps have been named consensus (received a majority of votes) first-team All-Americans and one, E.J. Henderson, has received that honor twice. Additionally, some have been awarded prestigious awards, including the Bednarik Award, Butkus Award, Lou Groza Award, Outland Trophy, and Lombardi Award. While no Terrapin has ever received the Heisman Trophy, which is bestowed upon college football's most outstanding player, several have received votes by the award's selection committee. Quarterbacks Jack Scarbath and Bernie Faloney finished second and fourth in the voting in 1952 and 1953, respectively. Additionally, Bob Pellegrini, Gary Collins, Randy White, and Boomer Esiason all finished in the top-ten of the voting for a Heisman. Seven Maryland players and four coaches have been inducted into the College Football Hall of Fame. Bear Bryant, Jerry Claiborne, Clark Shaughnessy, and Jim Tatum were inducted as coaches. The players included Dick Modzelewski, Bob Pellegrini, Jack Scarbath, and Bob Ward. Stan Jones and Randy White were also inducted into the Pro Football Hall of Fame.

=== College Football Hall of Famers ===
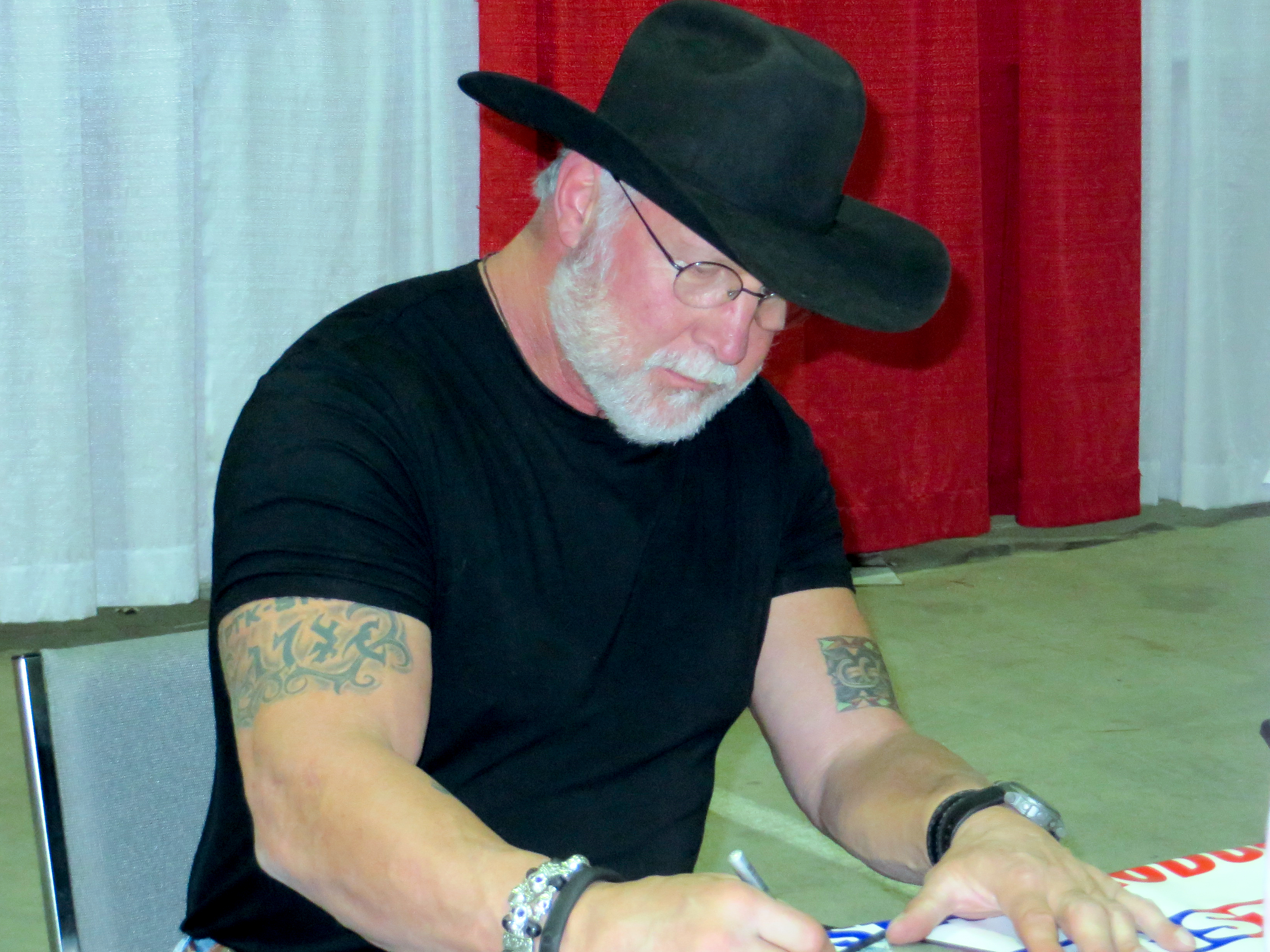
Hall of Fame DT Randy White (1972–1974)

| Inducted | Player | Position | Tenure |
|---|---|---|---|
| 1980 | Bob Ward | G | 1948–1951 |
| 1983 | Jack Scarbath | QB | 1950–1952 |
| 1993 | Dick Modzelewski | T | 1950–1952 |
| 1994 | Randy White† | DT | 1972–1974 |
| 1996 | Bob Pellegrini | C | 1953–1955 |
| 2000 | Stan Jones† | T | 1951–1953 |
| 2020 | E.J. Henderson | LB | 1999–2002 |

† Player is also in Pro Football Hall of Fame

== Future non-conference opponents ==
Announced schedules as of May 29, 2026.

| 2026 | 2027 | 2028 | 2029 | 2030 | 2031 |
|---|---|---|---|---|---|
| Hampton | James Madison | Towson | Toledo | | |
| at UConn | Youngstown State | Delaware | | at Wake Forest | Wake Forest |
| Virginia Tech | Baylor | at Baylor | at Virginia Tech | Towson | |

== See also ==
- List of Maryland Terrapins in the NFL draft
