= Grenville Lewis =

American football player and coach (1875–1964)

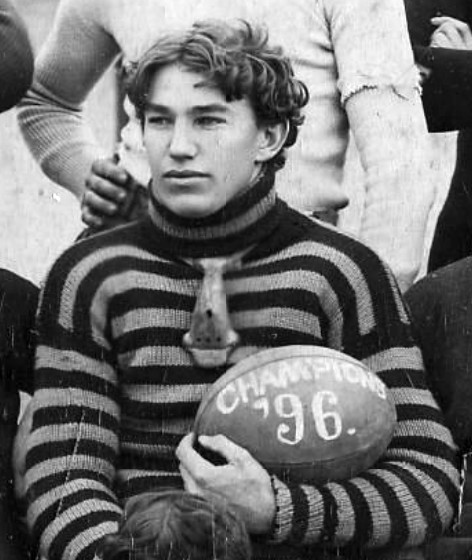
- Lewis as captain/coach of the 1896 M.A.C. football team

Biographical details
- Born: November 12, 1875; Washington D.C., U.S.
- Died: September 27, 1964 (aged 88); Maryland, U.S.

Playing career
- 1894: Maryland
- 1896: Maryland
- 1897: George Washington
- 1898: Latrobe AA
- 1900: Homestead Library AC
- Position: Fullback

Coaching career (HC unless noted)
- 1896: Maryland

Head coaching record
- Overall: 6–2–2

Grenville Lewis Jr. (November 12, 1875 – September 27, 1964) was an American college football player and coach, an early professional football player, and an engineer and cattle rancher. He served as the head football coach at Maryland Agricultural College—now known as the University of Maryland, College Park—in 1896, compiling a record of 6–2–2.

== Early life and college ==
Lewis was born on November 12, 1875, in Washington, D.C., where he received a public education, including at the Business High School. He attended the Maryland Agricultural College, where he played as a fullback on the football team in 1894 and served as team captain in 1896. In his two seasons as a Maryland player, Lewis played every minute of each game. The school briefly discontinued its football team in 1895, but resurrected it the following year. As team captain in 1896, Lewis instituted the program's first physical training regimen, which included calisthenics and long-distance running. As a coach in 1896, Lewis compiled a 6–2–2 record. Lewis also played on the baseball team and served as its captain in 1897. He graduated in 1897 with a Bachelor of Science degree from the school's Scientific Course. In 1897, Lewis intended to commute to College Park from Washington, D.C. to assist Maryland captain and player-coach John Lillibridge with his coaching duties. However, the Columbian University (now George Washington University) Law School offered Lewis a scholarship and a position as football coach, captain, and fullback, which he accepted.

== Professional football ==
Lewis played professional football with Dave Berry's Latrobe team in 1898. At the end of that season, he was selected to the Western Pennsylvania All-Star football team as a last-minute replacement at fullback. He led the All-Stars in yardage in the team's 16–0 loss to the Duquesne Country and Athletic Club, a contest that may have been the first pro football all-star game. In 1900, Lewis joined another aggregation of stars, the Homestead Library Athletic Club football team.

== Other work and later life ==
After college, outside of football, Lewis worked in cattle ranching in Honduras until 1900. He then worked for Clark and Krebs Consulting Engineers in Charleston, West Virginia through 1905. In April 1904, he married Lillian Compton née Snowden. Lewis worked as an engineer on the Virginian Railway, a superintendent for the New Etna Coal Company in Chattanooga, Tennessee, and for the Straight Creek Coal and Coke Company in Kentucky until 1908. He was then president and manager of the Ideal Block Coal Company in Lily, Kentucky. Lewis lived in Pineville, Kentucky and was a member of the American Institute of Mining, Metallurgical, and Petroleum Engineers. In 1916, he was working as a superintendent for the Virginia Iron, Coal and Coke Company.

Lewis later lived in Hollywood, Maryland and died in September 1964.

== Head coaching record ==
Year	Team	Overall	Conference	Standing	Bowl/playoffs
Maryland Aggies (Maryland Intercollegiate Football Association) (1896)
1896	Maryland	6–2–2	1–0–1		
Maryland:		6–2–2	1–0–1		
Total:		6–2–2			
