= Charley Donnelly =

American college sports coach

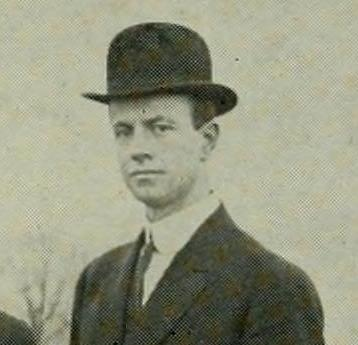
- Donnelly at Maryland in 1911

Biographical details
- Born: February 4, 1885; Worcester, Massachusetts, U.S.
- Died: May 1967 (aged 67); Worcester, Massachusetts, U.S.

Playing career
- 1907: Holy Cross
- Position: Quarterback

Coaching career (HC unless noted)

Football
- 1908–1910: Eastern HS (DC)
- 1911: Maryland
- 1913: Worcester Tech

Golf
- 1934–1948: Holy Cross

Head coaching record
- Overall: 2–11–2

Charles Francis Donnelly (February 4, 1885 – May 1967) was an American educator, golfer, and college football and golf coach. He served as the head football coach at Maryland Agricultural College—now known as the University of Maryland, College Park—in 1911 and Worcester Polytechnic Institute in 1913. Donnelly was also the head golf coach at the College of the Holy Cross from 1934 to 1948.

== Life and career ==
A native of Worcester, Massachusetts, Charley was the third child of John and Mary Ellen (Corcoran) Donnelly and the younger brother of James C. Donnelly, a standout football player and coach. His youngest brother, Ralph E. Donnelly, was also a notable football player and war hero. He attended Worcester High School, where he played on a championship football team. He attended the College of the Holy Cross, and played as a substitute quarterback on the football team in 1907. After college, he began selling insurance and had an office out of 311 Main Street. In 1910, he moved to Washington, D.C., and he coached Eastern High School on Capitol Hill in Washington, D.C., and The Washington Herald considered that team "one of the best football elevens in the history of the institution". Donnelly also coached the Eastern High baseball team to success.

In June 1911, while he worked as a clerk for the Census Bureau, Maryland Agricultural College—now known as the University of Maryland, College Park—hired him as an assistant English instructor and head coach for its football and baseball teams. Donnelly resigned as coach midseason after the football team compiled a 2–4–2 record, including an embarrassing 14–0 loss to Central High School. Maryland turned to alumnus Curley Byrd, high school coach at Western High School, as his replacement.

He returned to Worcester in 1912 and by 1917, he was listed as the assistant state actuary. He soon was selling insurance again and eventually he became a partner in the local agency Sullivan, Garrity & Donnelly. Charles married Ethel (Estes) Donnelly and they had no children. In 1913, he returned to coaching football for one season when he was head coach at Worcester Polytechnic Institute. During the 1940s, Charles was the head of the License Commission for the City of Worcester. At the end of his life he lived at the apartment on 46 Elm Street in Worcester. He died on May 1, 1967, at age 82.

Donnelly was an accomplished golfer. On August 1, 1926, he set records for nine and 18 holes at the Leicester Country Club. In 1927, he won the Worcester Municipal golf championship. In 1932, he finished second in the Northeastern District Knights of Columbus golf tournament in Longmeadow, Massachusetts.

Donnelly served as the coach of the golf team at his alma mater, Holy Cross, between at least 1934 and 1948. While there, he coached future professional golfers Paul Harney and Willie Turnesa. In 1943, Donnelly captured the New England senior golf championship at Newtonville in an 18-hole playoff with a score of 79 strokes. From 1951 to 1954, Donnelly was the president of the New England Senior Golfers' Association.

== Head coaching record ==
=== College football ===
Year	Team	Overall	Conference	Standing	Bowl/playoffs
Maryland Aggies (Independent) (1911)
1911	Maryland	2–4–2			
Maryland:		2–4–2			
Worcester Tech Engineers (Independent) (1913)
1913	Worcester Tech	0–7			
Worcester Tech:		0–7			
Total:		2–11–2			
