= Charles W. Melick =

American educator and coach (1877–1960)

Biographical details
- Born: May 20, 1877; Lincoln, Nebraska, U.S.
- Died: April 15, 1960 (aged 82); Pontiac, Michigan, U.S.

Coaching career (HC unless noted)

Football
- 1907: Maryland

Basketball
- 1905–1906: Kansas State

Head coaching record
- Overall: 3–6 (football); 7–9 (basketball)

Charles Wesley Melick (May 20, 1877 – April 15, 1960) was an American educator and college football and college basketball coach. He served as the first head basketball coach for Kansas State, in 1905–06, and was head football coach at Maryland Agricultural College—now known as the University of Maryland, College Park—in 1907.

== Biography ==
Melick spent most of his early life in the Midwest, primarily in Nebraska. He attended the University of Nebraska, where he received a Bachelor of Science degree, and then worked as a dairy husbandry assistant at the Kansas State Agricultural College Agricultural Experiment Station. In 1905, he coached the track and field team at Kansas State. Melick is also credited as the first basketball coach in the Kansas State history, posting a 7–9 record in the 1905–06 season. While working at Kansas State, Melick was credited with the invention of new drink he called "Kansas Ambrosia", a mixture of ice cream and buttermilk that could be "flavored to suit taste" and "served at all times."

At the age of 29 in 1906, he moved to Maryland for work. He worked at the Maryland Agricultural Experiment Station as a professor of dairy husbandry. While he worked at the Maryland Agricultural Experiment Station, Melick became the head coach for the Maryland Agricultural College (now University of Maryland) football team in 1907. He hired Washington attorney Durant Church as an assistant coach, and Church tutored Curley Byrd in the art of kicking. Byrd also assisted with coaching as both Melick and Church were often busy with their full-time professional jobs.

Melick, a native of the then homogeneous Midwestern United States, was surprised at the state of race relations when he moved to Maryland, where about a quarter of the population was black. He wrote Some Phases of the Negro Question based on his observations in 1908, and in which he criticized racial integration.

== Published works ==
- Dairy Laboratory Guide, 1907.
- Some Phases of the Negro Question, 1908.

== Head coaching record ==
=== Football ===
Year	Team	Overall	Conference	Standing	Bowl/playoffs
Maryland Aggies (Independent) (1907)
1907	Maryland	3–6			
Maryland:		3–6			
Total:		3–6			
