= F. H. Peters =

American football player and coach

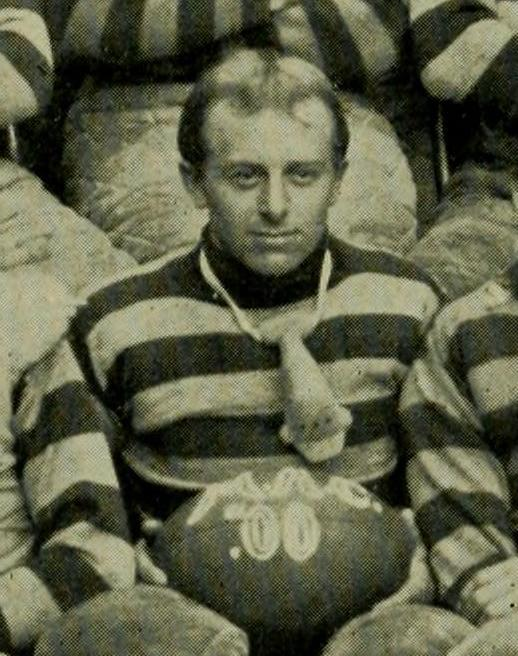
- Peters at Maryland in 1900

Playing career
- 1898–1900: Maryland
- Position: End

Coaching career (HC unless noted)
- 1900: Maryland

Head coaching record
- Overall: 3–4–1

Francis Henry Peters was an American college football coach. He served as the head football coach at Maryland Agricultural College—now known as the University of Maryland, College Park—in 1900, compiling a record of 3–4–1.

== Biography ==
A native of Wesley Station, Maryland, Peters attended the Maryland Agricultural College, where he played on the football team as an end from 1898 to 1900. During the 1899 season, Peters served as acting captain in place of Sam Cooke who had suffered an injury, and he was elected team captain and served as player-coach for the 1900 season. The Aggies finished the 1900 season with a 3–4–1 record.

At the Maryland Agricultural College, Peters also played on the baseball team as a right fielder, and competed in the hammer throw, shot put, broad jump and hurdles events as a member of the track and field team.

== Head coaching record ==
Year	Team	Overall	Conference	Standing	Bowl/playoffs
Maryland Aggies (Independent) (1900)
1900	Maryland	3–4–1			
Maryland:		3–4–1			
Total:		3–4–1			
