= John Lillibridge =

American football player and coach

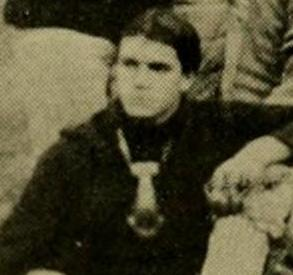
- Lillibridge at Maryland in 1896

Biographical details
- Born: June 27, 1878; Laurel, Maryland, U.S.

Playing career
- 1896–1897: Maryland
- Position: End

Coaching career (HC unless noted)
- 1897: Maryland

Head coaching record
- Overall: 2–4

John Ambrose Lillibridge (June 27, 1878 – ?) was an American businessman and college football coach. He served as the head football coach at Maryland Agricultural College—now known as the University of Maryland, College Park—in 1897, compiling a record of 2–4.

== Biography ==
Lillibridge was born in 1878 in Laurel, Maryland and enrolled at the Maryland Agricultural College (now the University of Maryland) in 1894. He played as an end on the football team in 1896 and 1897. Lillibridge served as captain and player-coach in 1897. The Aggies posted a 2–4 record that season.

Lillibridge graduated in 1898 with an A.B. degree through the school's Classical Course. He worked as an accountant for the Maryland Steel Company and then as a sales representative for the Barrett Manufacturing Company.

== Head coaching record ==
| Year | Team | Overall | Conference | Standing | Bowl/playoffs |
|---|---|---|---|---|---|
Maryland Aggies (Maryland Intercollegiate Football Association) (1897)
| 1897 | Maryland | 2–4 | 0–3 | | |
| Maryland: | | 2–4 | 0–3 | | |
| Total: | | 2–4 | | | |
