= S. S. Cooke =

American college football coach (1879–1944)

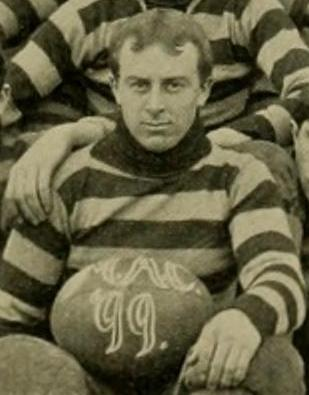
- Cooke at Maryland in 1899

Biographical details
- Born: August 7, 1879; Hyattsville, Maryland, U.S.
- Died: May 28, 1944 (aged 64); Philadelphia, Pennsylvania, U.S.

Playing career
- 1897–1899: Maryland
- Position: Fullback

Coaching career (HC unless noted)
- 1899: Maryland

Head coaching record
- Overall: 1–4

Samuel Stephen Cooke Sr. (August 7, 1879 – May 28, 1944) was an American college football coach. He served as the head football coach at Maryland Agricultural College—now known as the University of Maryland, College Park—in 1899, compiling a record of 1–4.

== Biography ==
A native of Hyattsville, Maryland, Cooke enrolled at the Maryland Agricultural College (now the University of Maryland) in 1897. He played on the football team from 1897 to 1899 as a fullback. In the 1898 game against Western Maryland, Cooke performed the dubious feat of kicking a punt from midfield over his head and backwards 25 yards. The opponent scored a touchdown shortly thereafter. The following season, the team elected Cooke as captain, but he suffered a broken arm in the first game against Western Maryland. By Thanksgiving, he returned to the sport, playing for the Hyattsville town team. Cooke left the college before graduating and went to work for the Potomac Electric Power Company in Washington, D.C. He married Mary née Ward on March 28, 1910.

== Head coaching record ==
Year	Team	Overall	Conference	Standing	Bowl/playoffs
Maryland Aggies (Independent) (1899)
1899	Maryland	1–4			
Maryland:		1–4			
Total:		1–4			
