= 1910 Delaware football team =

American college football season

1910 Delaware football
- Conference: Independent
- Record: 1–2–2
- Head coach: William McAvoy (3rd season)
- Captain: Carl A. Taylor

1910 Southern college football independents records
	Conf.			Overall
Team	W	L	T	W		L		T
Central University		–		9	–	0	–	0
Louisiana Industrial		–		7	–	0	–	0
Stetson		–		3	–	0	–	0
Navy		–		8	–	0	–	1
North Carolina A&M		–		4	–	0	–	2
Spring Hill		–		3	–	0	–	1
Texas A&M		–		8	–	1	–	0
Arkansas		–		7	–	1	–	0
Florida		–		6	–	1	–	0
Baylor		–		6	–	1	–	1
Georgetown		–		6	–	1	–	1
Marshall		–		5	–	1	–	1
Kentucky State		–		7	–	2	–	0
Texas		–		6	–	2	–	0
Virginia		–		6	–	2	–	0
Southwestern Louisiana Industrial		–		6	–	2	–	1
Chattanooga		–		5	–	2	–	1
Kendall		–		2	–	1	–	1
Maryland		–		4	–	3	–	1
Oklahoma		–		4	–	2	–	1
Washington and Lee		–		4	–	3	–	0
South Carolina		–		4	–	4	–	0
Birmingham		–		3	–	3	–	1
VMI		–		3	–	3	–	1
Davidson		–		3	–	4	–	2
Oklahoma A&M		–		3	–	4	–	0
West Virginia		–		2	–	4	–	1
Catholic University		–		2	–	4	–	0
North Carolina		–		3	–	6	–	0
George Washington		–		2	–	2	–	2
Wake Forest		–		2	–	7	–	0
Delaware		–		1	–	2	–	2
Mississippi College		–		0	–	4	–	0
Southwest Texas State		–		0	–	4	–	0
Tulane		–		0	–	7	–	0

The 1910 Delaware football team was an American football team that represented Delaware College (later renamed the University of Delaware) as an independent during the 1910 college football season. In its third season under head coach William McAvoy, the team compiled a 1–2–2 record and was outscored by a total of 49 to 19. Carl A. Taylor was the team captain. The team played its home games in Newark, Delaware.

== Schedule ==
Date	Opponent	Site	Result	Source
October 1	Williamson	Newark, DE	T 0–0	
October 8	at Haverford	Haverford, PA	T 5–5	
October 15	at Mount St. Mary's	Emmitsburg, MD	W 14–6	
October 22	at Swarthmore	Swarthmore, PA	L 0–27	
October 29	Muhlenberg	Newark, DE	L 0–11	
