= 1910 VPI football team =

American college football season

1910 VPI football
- Conference: Independent
- Record: 6–2
- Head coach: Branch Bocock (2nd season)
- Captain: Vivian Burnett Hodgson
- Home stadium: Miles Field

1910 South Atlantic Intercollegiate Athletic Association football standings
	Conf.					Overall
Team	W		L		T	W		L		T
Georgetown +	2	–	0	–	1	6	–	1	–	1
VPI	3	–	1	–	0	6	–	2	–	0
Davidson	1	–	1	–	0	6	–	2	–	0
William & Mary	1	–	1	–	0	1	–	7	–	1
George Washington	0	–	1	–	0	0	–	1	–	0
Richmond	0	–	4	–	0	2	–	5	–	1
+ – Conference co-champions

The 1910 VPI football team represented Virginia Agricultural and Mechanical College and Polytechnic Institute in the 1910 college football season. The team was led by their head coach Branch Bocock and finished with a record of six wins and two losses (6–2).

== Schedule ==
Date	Time	Opponent	Site	Result	Attendance	Source
October 1		Hampden–Sydney	Miles Field; Blacksburg, VA	W 18–0		
October 5		Davidson	Miles Field; Blacksburg, VA	W 16–6		
October 15	3:00 p.m.	Western Maryland	Miles Field; Blacksburg, VA	W 13–0		
October 22		at Navy	Worden Field; Annapolis, MD	L 0–3		
October 29	3:00 p.m.	vs. Washington and Lee	Fair Grounds; Roanoke, VA	W 23–0	2,500	
November 5	3:15 p.m.	vs. North Carolina	Broad Street Park; Richmond, VA	W 20–0	3,000	
November 12		vs. George Washington	Lynchburg, VA	W 16–5		
November 24	2:30 p.m.	vs. North Carolina A&M	Lafayette Field; Norfolk, VA	L 3–5	10,000–12,000	

== Before the season ==
The 1909 VPI football team compiled a 6–1 record and were led by Branch Bocock in his first season as head coach.

== Game summaries ==
=== Hampden–Sydney ===
VPI's first game of the season was a victory over Hampden–Sydney at Miles Field.

=== Davidson ===
After their victory over Hampden–Sydney, VPI played Davidson College at Miles Field.

The starting lineup for VPI was: A. Hodgson (left end), Rogers (left tackle), W. Legge (left guard), Gibbs (center), Pick (right guard), Jones (right tackle), H. B. Hughes (right end), J. Hughes (quarterback), Bernier (left halfback), F. Legge (right halfback), V. Hodgson (fullback).

The starting lineup for Davidson was: DeWitt Kluttz (left end), John Phipps (left tackle), William Thompson (left guard), David McQueen (center), William Wolfe (right guard), J. C. Cashion (right tackle), Lunsford Richardson (right end), James Pharr (quarterback), Graham (left halfback), Samuel Erwin (right halfback), Everett Booe (fullback).

=== Cancelled Game with Eastern College ===
VPI was scheduled to play Eastern College on October 12, but the manager of Eastern cancelled the match.

=== Western Maryland ===
Western Maryland at VPI

Team	1	2	3	4	Total
WMC	0	0	0	0	0
• VPI	5	0	5	3	13

- Date: October 15, 1910
- Location: Miles Field
  Blacksburg, VA
- Game start: 3:00 p.m.
- Referee: Moomaw (W&L)

The starting lineup for VPI was: McKan (left end), Rogers (left tackle), Pick (left guard), Gibbs (center), Ware (right guard), W. Legge (right tackle), Lefebre (right end), Bernier (quarterback), Derby (left halfback), F. Legge (right halfback), V. Hodgson (fullback). The substitutes were: Breckenridge, Harris, Hughes and Jones.

The starting lineup for Western Maryland was: Sprague (left end), W. H. Husung (left tackle), Leary (left guard), Wright (center), White (right guard), John Graefe (right tackle), Earnest Dukes (right end), Stultz (quarterback), A. M. Birdsall (left halfback), Dooley (right halfback), Twigg (fullback).The substitutes were: Price and Welch.

=== Navy ===
The starting lineup for VPI was: A. Hodgson (left end), Jones (left tackle), Pick (left guard), Gibbs (center), Breckenridge (right guard), W. Legge (right tackle), Welch (right end), Bernier (quarterback), F. Legge (left halfback), Derby (right halfback), V. Hodgson (fullback). The substitutes were: Harris, Hughes and Rogers.

The starting lineup for Navy was: Calvin Cobb (left end), Thomas King (left tackle), John H. Brown Jr. (left guard), Phillip Weems (center), Carroll Wright (right guard), Davis (right tackle), K. P. Gilchrist (right end), Ingram C. Sowell (quarterback), John Dalton (left halfback), Henry Clay (right halfback), Pete Rodes (fullback). The substitutes were: Lee Carey, Edwin, Robert Elmer, Donald Hamilton, Frank Loftin, Clarence McReavy, Myers, Shaw and Ray Wakeman.

=== Washington and Lee ===
Washington and Lee vs. VPI

Team	1	2	3	4	Total
W&L	0	0	0	0	0
• VPI	0	6	11	6	23

- Date: October 29, 1910
- Location: Fair Grounds
  Roanoke, VA
- Game start: 3:00 p.m.
- Game attendance: 2,500
- Referee: Jack Gass

The starting lineup for VPI was: A. Hodgson (left end), Jones (left tackle), Wyatt (left guard), Gibbs (center), Breckenridge (right guard), Burruss (right tackle), W. Legge (right end), J. Hughes (quarterback), Harris (left halfback), F. Legge (right halfback), V. Hodgson (fullback). The substitutes were: Bernier, Derby, McKan, Pick and Vaughan.

The starting lineup for Washington and Lee was: Lawrence Humphrey (left end), James Miller (left tackle), Paul Rogers (left guard), Leckey Kinnear (center), Daniel Clovis Moomaw (right guard), J. P. Hobson (right tackle), E. F. Burk (right end), T. C. McCallie (quarterback), Joseph Blackburn (left halfback), Roland Waddill (right halfback), I. R. Simms (fullback). The substitutes were: H. N. Barker, John Chatfield, E. P. Davis, Hamilton Derr, J. D. Harman, L. O'Quin and J. G. Wilson.

=== North Carolina ===
North Carolina vs. VPI

Team	1	2	3	4	Total
UNC	0	0	0	0	0
• VPI	0	9	0	11	20

- Date: November 5, 1910
- Location: Broad Street Park
  Richmond, VA
- Game start: 3:15 p.m.
- Game attendance: 3,000
- Referee: Williams (UVA)

The starting lineup for VPI was: A. Hodgson (left end), Jones (left tackle), Pick (left guard), Gibbs (center), Breckenridge (right guard), Burruss (right tackle), W. Legge (right end), J. Hughes (quarterback), F. Legge (left halfback), Derby (right halfback), V. Hodgson (fullback). The substitutes were: Gravely and Rogers.

The starting lineup for North Carolina was: Bob Winston (left end), Cecil Garrett (left tackle), Earl Thompson (left guard), Levi Brown (center), Carl Parker (right guard), Lonnie Abernethy (right tackle), John Venable (right end), William Belk (quarterback), Colin Ruffin (left halfback), James Calmes (right halfback), Andrew Porter (fullback). The substitutes were: Joseph Chambers and William Young.

=== George Washington ===
George Washington vs. VPI

Team	1	2	3	4	Total
GW	0	5	0	0	5
• VPI	6	0	5	5	16

- Date: November 12, 1910
- Location: Lynchburg, VA
- Referee: Frank Shaughnessy

The starting lineup for VPI was: W. Legge (left end), Burruss (left tackle), Breckenridge (left guard), Gibbs (center), Pick (right guard), Jones (right tackle), A. Hodgson (right end), J. Hughes (quarterback), Derby (left halfback), F. Legge (right halfback), V. Hodgson (fullback). The substitutes were: Gravely, Harris, Holt, Lefebre, Rogers and Vaughan.

The starting lineup for George Washington was: Langley (left end), Hart (left tackle), Herndon (left guard), Theodore Eickhoff (center), Richardson (right guard), F. Smith (right tackle), Matthew Farmer (right end), Cuthbert Farmer (quarterback), Willey (left halfback), H. Ellis (right halfback), Moore (fullback). The substitutes were: Robert Fowler, H. S. Hamlin, Valaer, Herbert White.

=== North Carolina A&M ===
North Carolina A&M vs. VPI

Team	1	2	3	4	Total
• NC A&M	5	0	0	0	5
VPI	0	3	0	0	3

- Date: November 24, 1910
- Location: Lafayette Field
  Norfolk, VA
- Game start: 2:30 p.m.
- Game attendance: 10,000–12,000
- Referee: Jack Gass

The starting lineup for VPI was: A. Hodgson (left end), Burruss (left tackle), Pick (left guard), Gibbs (center), Breckenridge (right guard), Jones (right tackle), W. Legge (right end), J. Hughes (quarterback), F. Legge (left halfback), Derby (right halfback), V. Hodgson (fullback). The substitutes were: Bernier, Harris, Holt and Rogers.

The starting lineup for North Carolina A&M was: Harry Hartsell (left end), W. T. Hurtt (left tackle), E. H. Gattis (left guard), John Bray (center), D. B. Floyd (right guard), G. C. Glenn (right tackle), David Seifert (right end), Tal Stafford (quarterback), H. M. Cool (left halfback), D. A. Robertson (right halfback), W. H. Von Eberstein (fullback). The substitutes were: James Sherman.

== After the season ==
In December 1910, the VPI players elected Aubrey Gravatt Gibbs as captain of the 1911 VPI football team.

== Players ==
=== Roster ===
VPI 1910 roster
Quarterback: John Hughes; Guards: John Breckenridge; Lewis A. Pick; Tackles: William Henry Burruss; Jones; Center: Aubrey Gibbs	Ends: Asbury Nathaniel Hodgson; Withrow Reynolds Legge; Halfbacks: Claude Palmer Derby; Frederick Hughes Legge; Fullback: Vivian Burnett Hodgson (Capt.)	Substitutes: Charles A. Bernier; William Seymour Gravely; Hargrove; Harris; Holt; Houston Boyd Hughes; Charles Woolfolk Coleman Mackan; Gordon Lefebre; James Rogers; Harry Vaughan; Ware; Stanley William Welch; Fred Tate Wyatt

=== Monogram Club members ===
Sixteen players received monograms for their participation on the 1910 VPI team.

Player	Hometown	Notes
Charles A. Bernier	Laconia, New Hampshire	Head football coach at Hampden–Sydney College from 1912 to 1916 and again from 1923 to 1938 and at VPI from 1917 to 1919, compiling a career college football record of 87–106–18.
John Breckenridge		
William Henry Burruss	Lynch Station, Virginia	
Claude Palmer Derby	Norfolk, Virginia	
Aubrey Gravatt Gibbs	Port Royal, Virginia	
William Seymour Gravely	Roanoke, Virginia	
Harris		
Asbury Nathaniel Hodgson	East Falls Church, Virginia	
Vivian Burnett Hodgson	Norfolk, Virginia	
John Leyburn Hughes	Newport News, Virginia	
Jones		
Frederick Hughes Legge	Washington, DC	
Withrow Reynolds Legge	Washington, DC	World War I veteran (First Lieutenant, Army). Fought in the Battle of Saint-Mihiel.
Lewis A. Pick	Brookneal, Virginia	Served as Chief of Engineers in the United States Army. Pick was awarded the Distinguished Service Medal with Oak Leaf Cluster. Pick City, North Dakota and Pickstown, South Dakota were named for him.
James Booth Rogers	Lovingston, Virginia	
Harry Briggs Vaughan	Norfolk, Virginia	World War I and World War II veteran (Major General, Army). Was awarded the Distinguished Service Medal.

== Coaching and training staff ==
- Head coach: Branch Bocock
- Manager: George William Hurt
