= Fred K. Nielsen =

Danish-American diplomat and football coach (1879–1963)

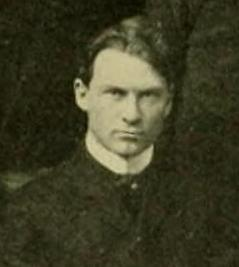
- Nielsen at Maryland in 1906

Biographical details
- Born: April 22, 1879; Slagelse, Denmark
- Died: January 12, 1963 (aged 83); Washington, D.C., U.S.

Playing career
- 1900: Nebraska
- Position: Halfback

Coaching career (HC unless noted)
- 1905–1906: Maryland
- 1907–1908: George Washington
- 1910–1911: Georgetown
- 1915–1916: Catholic University

Head coaching record
- Overall: 44–20–4

Fred Kenelm Nielsen (April 22, 1879 – January 12, 1963) was a Danish-American lawyer, diplomatic official, and college football coach. Nielsen served as the head football coach at the Maryland Agricultural College—now known as the University of Maryland, College Park—from 1905 to 1906, the George Washington University from 1907 to 1908, Georgetown University from 1910 to 1911, and the Catholic University of America from 1915 to 1916.

== Early life ==
Nielsen was born in Slagelse, Denmark on April 22, 1879. He emigrated to Omaha, Nebraska with his parents the following year. Nielsen attended the University of Nebraska, from which he graduated with a Bachelor of Arts degree in 1902 and a LL. B. in 1904. During college, he played on the Cornhuskers football team as a halfback, and earned a varsity letter in 1900.

== Professional career ==
Nielsen started his career with the United States Department of State in 1904. In 1905, the Maryland Agricultural College (now the University of Maryland) hired Nielsen as its head football coach. He replaced its previous coach, D. John Markey, who had quit after the school denied an increase to the job's $300 salary. Nielsen tolerated the low pay, however, because of his full-time job with the State Department. During his two years at Maryland, the Aggies posted an 11–7 record.

He continued coaching college football part-time in the Washington area. From 1907 to 1908, Nielsen was the head coach at the George Washington University. In his first year there, the Hatchetites posted a poor 2–5–1 record, but improved to 9–1–1 the following season, which was enough to clinch the South Atlantic Intercollegiate Athletic Association (SAIAA) championship. Nielsen then coached at Georgetown University from 1910 to 1911. In that period, his teams posted a 14–2–2 record and outscored their opponents 438–57. Georgetown's losses came at the hands of undefeated, untied, and unscored upon Pittsburgh and the Carlisle Indians led by Jim Thorpe. Georgetown secured the SAIAA championship both years of Nielsen's tenure. At the same time, Nielsen studied at the Georgetown University Law School, and received a Master of Law degree in 1906.

In 1913, Nielsen was named the Assistant Solicitor of the Department of State. In 1914, he was assigned as a plenipotentiary during discussions in Christiania, Norway of a Spitsbergen government. As the assistant solicitor, Nielsen did not intend to continue coaching, but in 1915, the Catholic University of America implored him to take over its ailing football program. He helmed the Cardinals from 1915 to 1916, and compiled a 9–6 record.

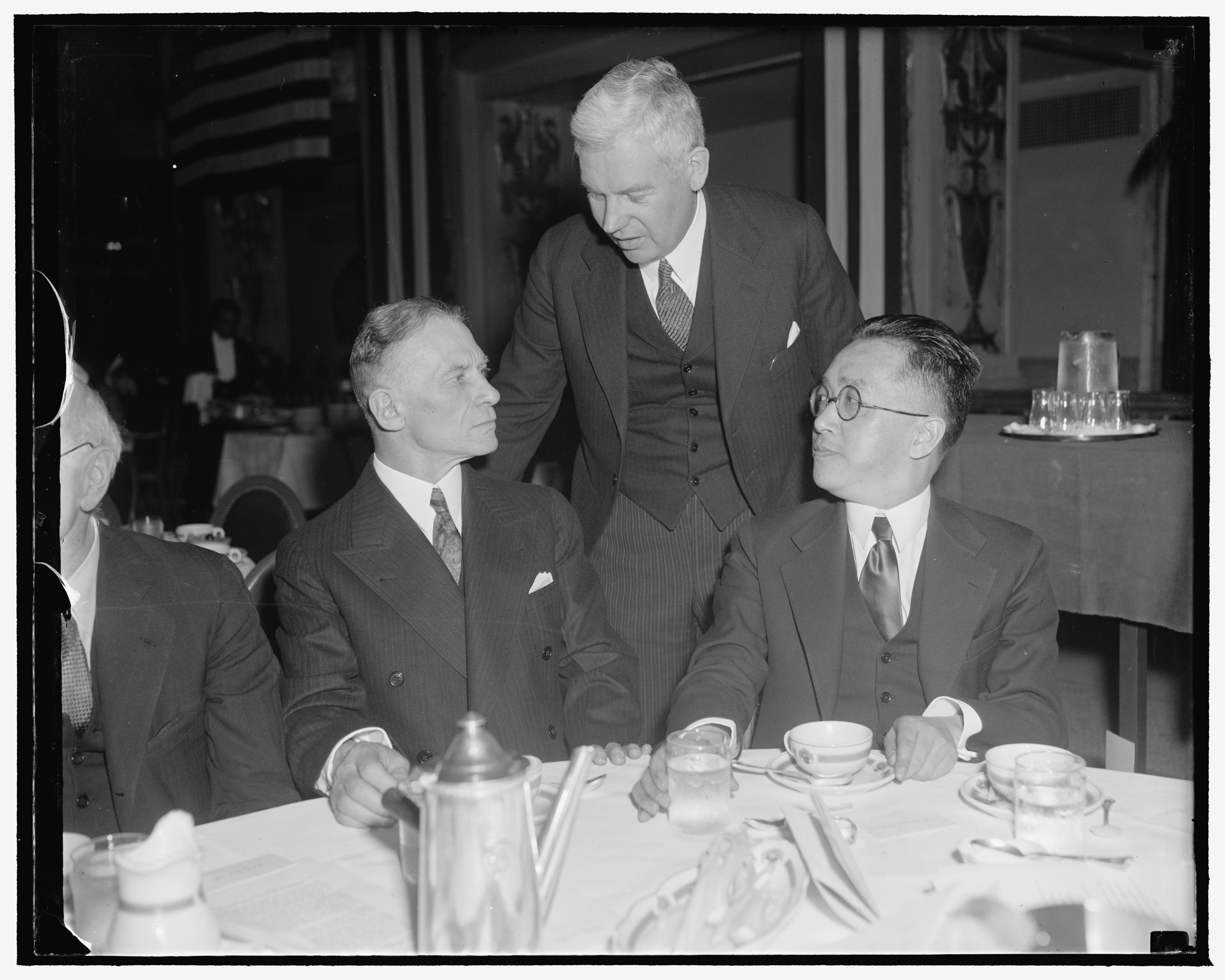
American Bar Association, Nielsen with William H. Vallance, and Chinese Ambassador Hu Shih in 1939.

In 1918, Nielsen served in the United States Army until Armistice and attained the rank of major. He represented the United States at the 1919 Paris Peace Conference, and was the primary American representative in a commission re-examining Belgian treaty obligations of 1839. Nielsen served on the committee that decided the sovereignty of the Spitsbergen archipelago. On June 23, 1920, President Wilson appointed Nielsen as the Solicitor of the State Department, the department's chief legal officer. Nielsen resigned from that position in 1922, and later that year, President Harding nominated him as the American representative for the British-American Claims Commission. Nielsen later served as the American commissioner of the Mexican Claims Commission, which existed from 1924 to 1937 to settle disputes between the two nations. In 1931, he resigned from that post "in disgust" at the actions of some of the Mexican and Panamanian delegates.

Nielsen died on January 12, 1963.

== Head coaching record ==
Year	Team	Overall	Conference	Standing	Bowl/playoffs
Maryland Aggies (Independent) (1905–1906)
1905	Maryland	6–4			
1906	Maryland	5–3			
Maryland:		11–7			
George Washington Hatchetites (Independent) (1907–1908)
1907	George Washington	2–5–1			
1908	George Washington	9–1–1			
George Washington:		11–5–2			
Georgetown Blue and Gray (Independent) (1910–1911)
1910	Georgetown	6–1–1		1st	
1911	Georgetown	7–1–1			
Georgetown:		13–2–2			
Catholic University Cardinals (South Atlantic Intercollegiate Athletic Association) (1915–1916)
1915	Catholic University	5–2	1–0	T–4th	
1916	Catholic University	4–4	2–1	T–4th	
Catholic:		9–6	3–1		
Total:		44–20–4			
