= E. V. Long =

American football player and sports coach (1885–1941)

Biographical details
- Born: July 11, 1885; Maroa, Illinois, U.S.
- Died: January 28, 1941 (aged 55); Wichita, Kansas, U.S.

Playing career

Football
- c. 1909: Harvard
- Position: Center

Coaching career (HC unless noted)

Football
- 1910: Richmond
- 1912–1913: Fairmount

Basketball
- 1912–1913: Fairmount

Baseball
- 1913: Fairmount

Head coaching record
- Overall: 7–17–1 (football); 1–11 (basketball)

Earl Van Meter "Bo" Long (July 11, 1885 – January 28, 1941) was an American college football, college basketball, and college baseball coach. He served as the head football coach at Richmond College—now known as the University of Richmond—in 1910 and Fairmount College—now known as Wichita State University—from 1912 to 1913.

== Early life, family, and playing career ==
Long was born on July 11, 1885, in Maroa, Illinois, to Silaws and Mary Jane Long. He married Jessie Lois Brown, of Canton, Illinois, on July 10, 1911. He attended Harvard University, where was a two-sport letter winner in football and baseball. Long was a substitute center on the 1909 Harvard Crimson football team.

== Coaching career ==
=== Richmond ===
Long was the 17th head football coach at the University of Richmond and he held that position for the 1910 season. His coaching record at Richmond was 2–5–1.

=== Fairmount ===
After leaving Richmond, Long was named the eighth head football coach at Fairmount College—now known as Wichita State University—and he held that position for two seasons, from 1912 until 1913. His coaching record at Fairmount was 6–11.

== Later life and death ==
Long attended Boston University School of Law. He was admitted to the bar in Kansas in 1914. Long died on January 28, 1941, at a hospital in Wichita.

== Head coaching record ==
| Year | Team | Overall | Conference | Standing | Bowl/playoffs |
|---|---|---|---|---|---|
Richmond Spiders (Eastern Virginia Intercollegiate Athletic Association) (1910)
| 1910 | Richmond | 1–6–1 | 0–3 | 4th | |
| Richmond: | | 1–6–1 | 0–3 | | |
Fairmount Wheatshockers (Kansas Collegiate Athletic Conference) (1912–1913)
| 1912 | Fairmount | 4–5 | | | |
| 1913 | Fairmount | 2–6 | 1–6 | 11th | |
| Fairmount: | | 6–11 | | | |
| Total: | | 7–17–1 | | | |
