= American-Mexican Claims Commission =

The American-Mexican Claims Commission, officially known as the General Claims Commission (Mexico and United States,) was a commission set up by treaty that adjudicated claims by citizens of the United States and Mexico for losses suffered due to the acts of one government against nationals of the other. The General Commission lasted from 1924 to 1934, when the mixed U.S.-Mexico commission was abandoned. There was a Special Commission that was set up to deal with claims arising from the era of the Mexican Revolution. Neither commission was successful and in 1934 the two governments engaged in direct bilateral negotiations and came to a settlement.

== History ==
Since Mexico's independence in 1821, the US and Mexico on a number of occasions had disputes over territory, taxation, and claims by US private citizens. Claims between 1825 and 1839 were arbitrated by a claims convention, on the suggestion of the Mexican government. The convention was established on April 11, 1839. Subsequent commissions were constituted in 1839, following the Texas Revolt and claims following the Treaty of Guadalupe Hidalgo (1848), the Gadsden Treaty (1854), and the McLane–Ocampo Treaty (1859). A commission was set up following the expulsion of the French in 1867, which was constituted on July 4, 1868.

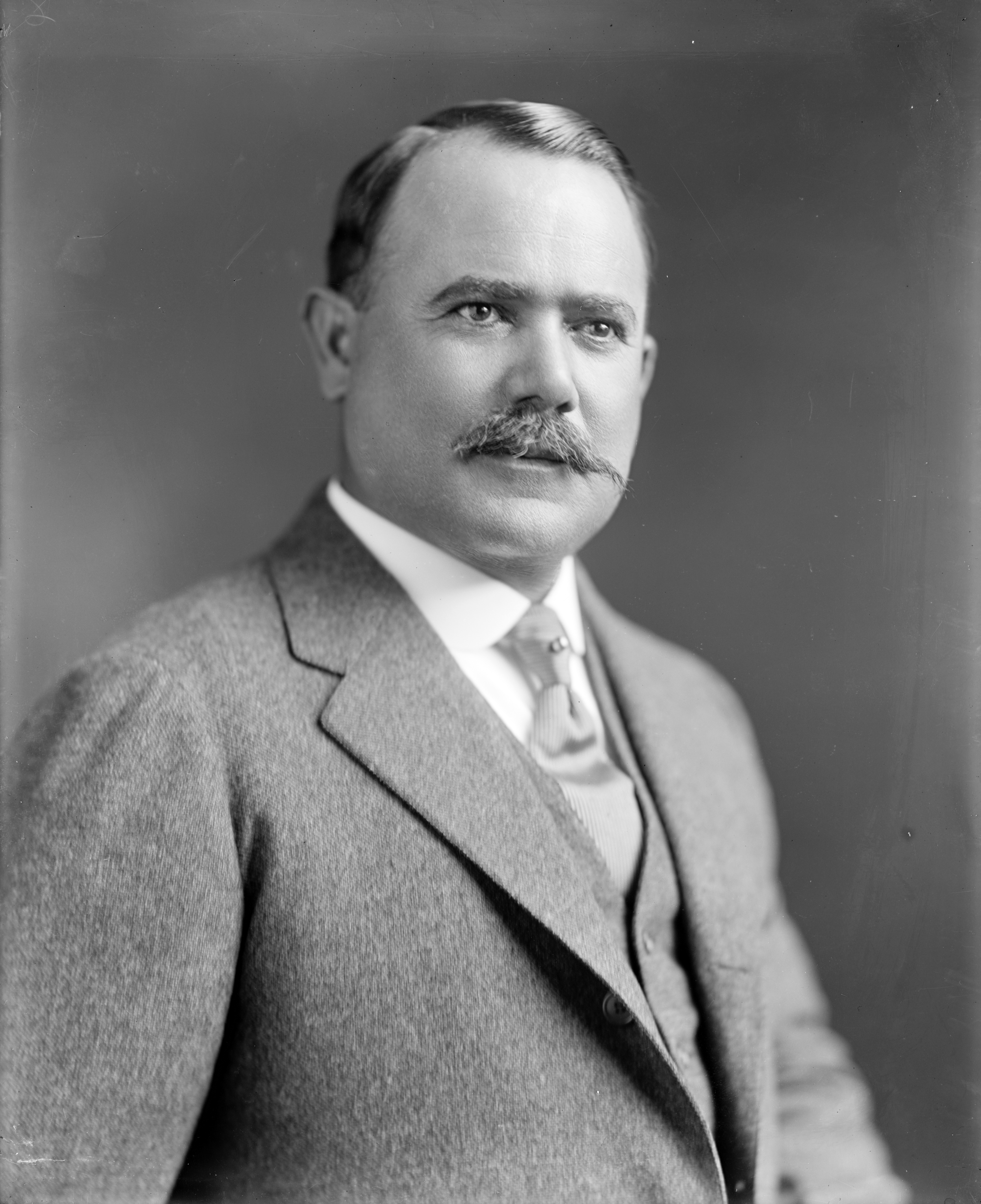
Mexican President Alvaro Obregón

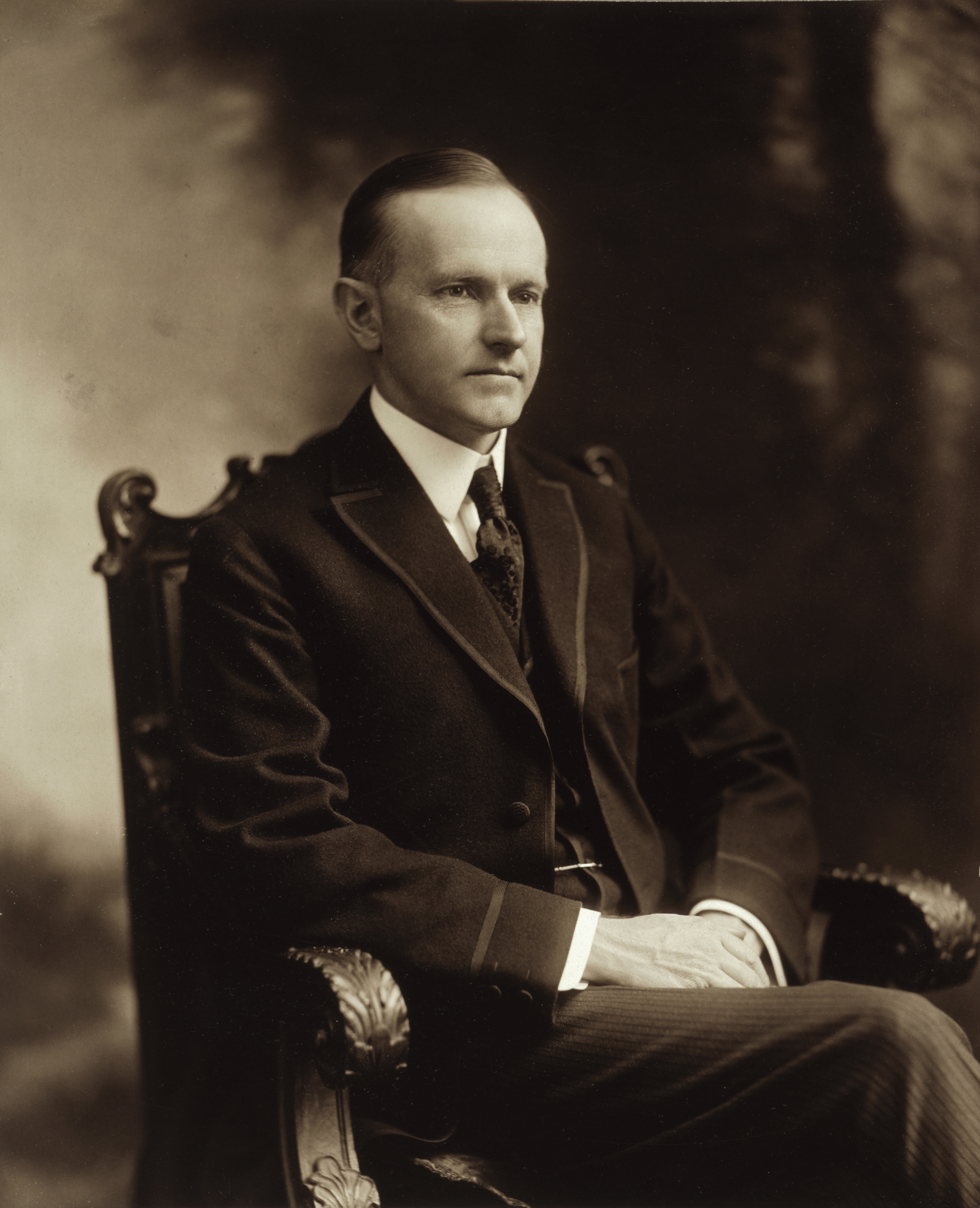
U.S. President Calvin Coolidge

The Commission was constituted under the terms of the General Claims Convention, signed September 8, 1923, in Washington, D.C., by the United States and the Mexico, during the administration of Mexican President Alvaro Obregón and U.S. President Calvin Coolidge (succeeding Warren G. Harding who died just a month earlier.) Obregón had sought U.S. diplomatic recognition for his government and engaged in bi-lateral talks with the U.S. over constitutional issues regarding oil, resulting in the Bucareli Treaty. The Mexican-U.S. General Claims Commission was another formal effort to renegotiate the relationship between the Mexico and the U.S. The convention, which took effect on March 1, 1924, was intended to improve relations between the countries by forming a commission to settle claims arising after July 4, 1868,“against one government by nationals of the other for losses or damages suffered by such nationals or their properties” and “for losses or damages originating from acts of officials or others acting for either government and resulting in injustice.” Excluded from the jurisdiction of the General Claims Commission were cases stemming from events related to revolutions or disturbed conditions in Mexico.

The General Commission met from 1924 to 1931 in Washington, D.C., and Mexico City. Work resumed in 1934 under a new protocol and format, with two commissioners, Genaro Fernández MacGregor (Mexico) and Oscar Underwood, Jr., US, both appointed in 1934.

The Special Claims Commission was formed to address claims arising from events which occurred between November 20, 1910, and May 31, 1920). With the Special Commission, U.S. claims for losses were countered by the Mexican government's position that some losses were due to "bandits", such as Pancho Villa, and not "true revolutionaries." Villa's forces had killed some U.S. engineers at Santa Ysabel, and the engineers' heirs entered a claim for over US$1 million, which the Mexican commissioners rejected on the grounds that "Villa at that time was a private bandit whose unfortunate activities were of no concern or responsibility to the Mexican government."

Neither the General Claims Commission nor the Special Claims Commission (which dealt with claims from the period of the Mexican Revolution were successful, in part due to differing estimates of damage and culpability, but also because political posturing made individual claims cause for the defense of national honor on both sides. Claims by U.S. citizens with counterclaims by Mexicans asserted high value for their losses, in anticipation that only a percentage would be paid in the end.

In 1934, direct bilateral negotiations between the U.S. and Mexican governments worked to settle the general and special claims through ordinary diplomatic channels. Compensation was established by an agreed-to formula (2.64% of face value) and claims were lumped together rather than examined on an individual basis. The compensation was paid in installments from one government to the other, to be parceled out by that government to the claimants. The quiet diplomacy rather than the bilateral commission accomplished the result of clearing the claims.

=== Controversy ===
There are controversies regarding the treaty. For example, there are those who claim that the Bucareli Treaty prevented Mexico from producing specialized machinery (engines, airplanes, etc.) or precision machinery, so Mexico has not yet emerged from the technological backwardness caused by the treaty. In addition to the fact that during the period between 1910 and 1930, civil wars and multiple military coups and internal rebellions (some sponsored by the United States and other foreign nations, such as Great Britain and Germany) devastated industries in Mexico, war reparations slowed higher education, as well as research and technological development, while social and political instability drove away foreign investment.

=== Membership ===
The Commission was composed of three members, one from the U.S., one from Mexico, and one from a neutral country. The commissioners were Cornelis van Vollenhoven of The Netherlands (neutral, served 1924 – August 30, 1927); Kristian Sindballe of Denmark (served July 16, 1928 – July 1, 1929; Horacio F. Alfaro, Panama, appointed by agreement of the two governments, serving from May 27, 1930. Genaro Fernández MacGregor (Mexican, served continuously from 1924), Edwin B. Parker (United States, served 1923 – resigned July 17, 1926), Fred Kenelm Nielsen (United States, appointed July 31, 1926, served continuously from then on).
