= Charles B. Crawford =

American football coach

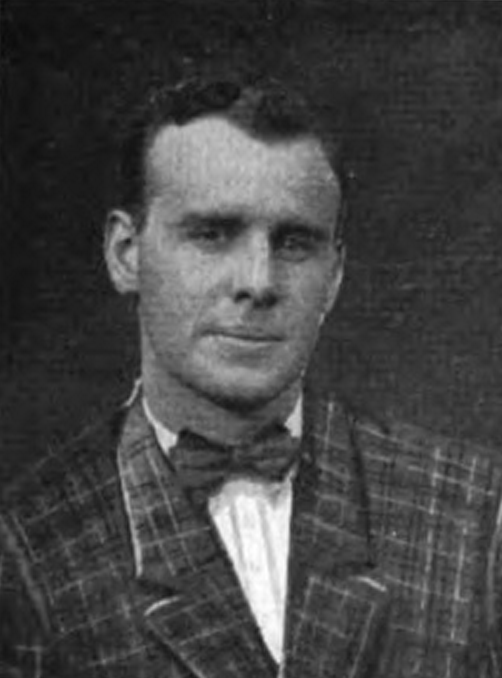
- Crawford pictured in Corks and Curls 1916, Virginia yearbook

Biographical details
- Born: May 7, 1884; New Jersey, U.S.
- Died: March 17, 1951 (aged 66); Washington, D.C., U.S.
- Education: University of Virginia (1908)

Coaching career (HC unless noted)
- 1908–1909: Virginia (assistant)
- 1910: Virginia

Head coaching record
- Overall: 6–2

Charles Brown Crawford (May 7, 1884 – March 17, 1951) was an American college football coach. He served as the head football coach at the University of Virginia for one season, in 1910, compiling a record of 6–2. Crawford was later a pediatrician in Washington, D.C.

== Head coaching record ==
Year	Team	Overall	Conference	Standing	Bowl/playoffs
Virginia Orange and Blue (Independent) (1910)
1910	Virginia	6–2			
Virginia:		6–2			
Total:		6–2			
