= 1910 TCU football team =

American college football season

1910 TCU football
- Conference: Texas Intercollegiate Athletic Association
- Record: 2–6–1 (0–1 TIAA)
- Head coach: Kemp Lewis (1st season)
- Captain: William Massie
- Home stadium: Haines Park, Butz Park

The 1910 TCU Horned Frogs football team represented Texas Christian University (TCU) as a member of the Texas Intercollegiate Athletic Association (TIAA) during the 1910 college football season. Led by Kemp Lewis in his first and only year as head coach, TCU compiled an overall record of 2–6–1. TCU returned in 1910 to Fort Worth, Texas, where the university had been founded, after operating the previous 15 years in Waco, Texas. The 1910 football team played their home games at Haines Park and Butz Park in Fort Worth. The team's captain was William Massie, who played center.

== Schedule ==
Date	Time	Opponent	Site	Result	Attendance	Source
October 8		Polytechnic (TX)*	Haines Park; Fort Worth, TX	T 6–6	1,400	
October 15		at Texas A&M*	College Station, TX (rivalry)	L 0–35		
October 24	4:20 p.m.	at Baylor*	Carroll Field; Waco, TX (rivalry)	L 0–52		
October 29		Trinity (TX)*	Haines Park; Fort Worth, TX	W 18–8		
November 1		Texas A&M*	Haines Park; Fort Worth, TX	L 6–23		
November 7		at Trinity (TX)*	Waxahachie, TX	W 9–0		
November 12		at Southwestern (TX)	Georgetown, TX	L 3–25		
November 18	4:00 p.m.	Baylor*	Butz Park; Fort Worth, TX	L 3–10		
November 24		at Epworth*	Oklahoma City, OK	L 0–30		
*Non-conference game
