= 1910 North Carolina A&M Aggies football team =

American college football season

1910 North Carolina A&M Aggies football

South Atlantic co-champion
- Conference: Independent
- Record: 4–0–2
- Head coach: Edward L. Greene (2nd season)
- Home stadium: Riddick Stadium

1910 Southern college football independents records
	Conf.			Overall
Team	W	L	T	W		L		T
Central University		–		9	–	0	–	0
Louisiana Industrial		–		7	–	0	–	0
Stetson		–		3	–	0	–	0
Navy		–		8	–	0	–	1
North Carolina A&M		–		4	–	0	–	2
Spring Hill		–		3	–	0	–	1
Texas A&M		–		8	–	1	–	0
Arkansas		–		7	–	1	–	0
Florida		–		6	–	1	–	0
Baylor		–		6	–	1	–	1
Georgetown		–		6	–	1	–	1
Marshall		–		5	–	1	–	1
Kentucky State		–		7	–	2	–	0
Texas		–		6	–	2	–	0
Virginia		–		6	–	2	–	0
Southwestern Louisiana Industrial		–		6	–	2	–	1
Chattanooga		–		5	–	2	–	1
Kendall		–		2	–	1	–	1
Maryland		–		4	–	3	–	1
Oklahoma		–		4	–	2	–	1
Washington and Lee		–		4	–	3	–	0
South Carolina		–		4	–	4	–	0
Birmingham		–		3	–	3	–	1
VMI		–		3	–	3	–	1
Davidson		–		3	–	4	–	2
Oklahoma A&M		–		3	–	4	–	0
West Virginia		–		2	–	4	–	1
Catholic University		–		2	–	4	–	0
North Carolina		–		3	–	6	–	0
George Washington		–		2	–	2	–	2
Wake Forest		–		2	–	7	–	0
Delaware		–		1	–	2	–	2
Mississippi College		–		0	–	4	–	0
Southwest Texas State		–		0	–	4	–	0
Tulane		–		0	–	7	–	0

The 1910 North Carolina A&M Aggies football team represented the North Carolina A&M Aggies of North Carolina College of Agriculture and Mechanic Arts (now known as North Carolina State University) during the 1910 college football season. The Aggies were coached by Edward L. Greene in his second year as head coach, compiling a 4–0–2 record and tied with Georgetown Hoyas for a Southern championship amongst the South Atlantic teams.

== Schedule ==
Date	Time	Opponent	Site	Result	Attendance	Source
October 8		Georgetown	Riddick Stadium; Raleigh, NC	T 0–0		
October 20		Villanova	Riddick Stadium; Raleigh, NC	T 6–6	2,000	
October 29		Eastern (Virginia)	Riddick Stadium; Raleigh, NC	W 22–0		
November 12		Richmond	Riddick Stadium; Raleigh, NC	W 50–0		
November 19		Wake Forest	Riddick Stadium; Raleigh, NC (rivalry)	W 28–3		
November 24	2:30 p.m.	vs. VPI	Lafayette Field; Norfolk, VA	W 5–3	10,000–12,000	
