= 1910 William & Mary Orange and Black football team =

American college football season

1910 William & Mary Orange and Black football
- Conference: Eastern Virginia Intercollegiate Athletic Association
- Record: 1–7–1 (1–2 EVIAA)
- Head coach: J. Merrill Blanchard (3rd season)
- Captain: W. B. Lee

1910 Eastern Virginia Intercollegiate Athletic Association football standings
	Conf.					Overall
Team	W		L		T	W		L		T
Randolph–Macon $	3	–	0	–	0	4	–	4	–	0
Hampden–Sydney	2	–	1	–	0	4	–	3	–	0
William & Mary	1	–	2	–	0	1	–	7	–	1
Richmond	0	–	3	–	0	1	–	6	–	1
$ – Conference champion

The 1910 William & Mary Orange and Black football team represented the College of William & Mary as a member of the Eastern Virginia Intercollegiate Athletic Association (EVIAA) during the 1910 college football season. Led by third-year head coach J. Merrill Blanchard, who returned to William & Mary after helming the team in 1904 and 1905, the Orange and Black finished the season with an overall record of 1–7–1 and mark of 1–2 in EVIAA play.

== Schedule ==
Date	Time	Opponent	Site	Result	Source
September 24		at Virginia*	Madison Hall Field; Charlottesville, VA	L 0–10	
October 1		University College of Medicine*	Williamsburg, VA	L 3–5	
October 8		Norfolk High School*	Williamsburg, VA	T 5–5	
October 15		at VMI*	Lexington, VA (rivalry)	L 0–33	
October 22		at Norfolk Blues*	Norfolk, VA	L 0–41	
October 29		Hampden–Sydney	Williamsburg, VA	L 6–17	
November 5		Randolph–Macon	Williamsburg, VA	L 2–11	
November 12		St. Vincent's Academy*	Williamsburg, VA	L 6–18	
November 19	3:00 p.m.	at Richmond	Broad Street Park; Richmond, VA (rivalry)	W 18–6	
*Non-conference game
