= 1910 Kentucky State College Wildcats football team =

American college football season

1910 Kentucky State College Wildcats football
- Conference: Kentucky Intercollegiate Athletic Association
- Record: 7–2 (2–1 KIAA)
- Head coach: Edwin Sweetland (2nd season)
- Captain: Dick Webb

1910 Southern college football independents records
	Conf.			Overall
Team	W	L	T	W		L		T
Central University		–		9	–	0	–	0
Louisiana Industrial		–		7	–	0	–	0
Stetson		–		3	–	0	–	0
Navy		–		8	–	0	–	1
North Carolina A&M		–		4	–	0	–	2
Spring Hill		–		3	–	0	–	1
Texas A&M		–		8	–	1	–	0
Arkansas		–		7	–	1	–	0
Florida		–		6	–	1	–	0
Baylor		–		6	–	1	–	1
Georgetown		–		6	–	1	–	1
Marshall		–		5	–	1	–	1
Kentucky State		–		7	–	2	–	0
Texas		–		6	–	2	–	0
Virginia		–		6	–	2	–	0
Southwestern Louisiana Industrial		–		6	–	2	–	1
Chattanooga		–		5	–	2	–	1
Kendall		–		2	–	1	–	1
Maryland		–		4	–	3	–	1
Oklahoma		–		4	–	2	–	1
Washington and Lee		–		4	–	3	–	0
South Carolina		–		4	–	4	–	0
Birmingham		–		3	–	3	–	1
VMI		–		3	–	3	–	1
Davidson		–		3	–	4	–	2
Oklahoma A&M		–		3	–	4	–	0
West Virginia		–		2	–	4	–	1
Catholic University		–		2	–	4	–	0
North Carolina		–		3	–	6	–	0
George Washington		–		2	–	2	–	2
Wake Forest		–		2	–	7	–	0
Delaware		–		1	–	2	–	2
Mississippi College		–		0	–	4	–	0
Southwest Texas State		–		0	–	4	–	0
Tulane		–		0	–	7	–	0

The 1910 Kentucky State College Wildcats football team represented Kentucky State College—now known as the University of Kentucky—during the 1910 college football season.

== Schedule ==
Date	Time	Opponent	Site	Result	Attendance	Source
September 24		Ohio	Stoll Field; Lexington, KY	W 12–0	> 1,000	
October 1		Maryville (TN)	Stoll Field; Lexington, KY	W 12–0		
October 8		North Carolina	Stoll Field; Lexington, KY	W 11–0		
October 15		at Kentucky Wesleyan	Winchester, KY	W 42–0		
October 22		Georgetown (KY)	Stoll Field; Lexington, KY	W 37–0		
October 29		Tulane	Stoll Field; Lexington, KY	W 10–3		
November 5		at Tennessee	Waite Field; Knoxville, TN (rivalry)	W 10–0		
November 12	3:30 p.m.	at Saint Louis	Sportsman's Park; St. Louis, MO	L 9–0		
November 24		Central University	Stoll Field; Lexington, KY (rivalry)	L 12–6		
All times are in Eastern time
