= 1910 Florida football team =

American college football season

1910 Florida football
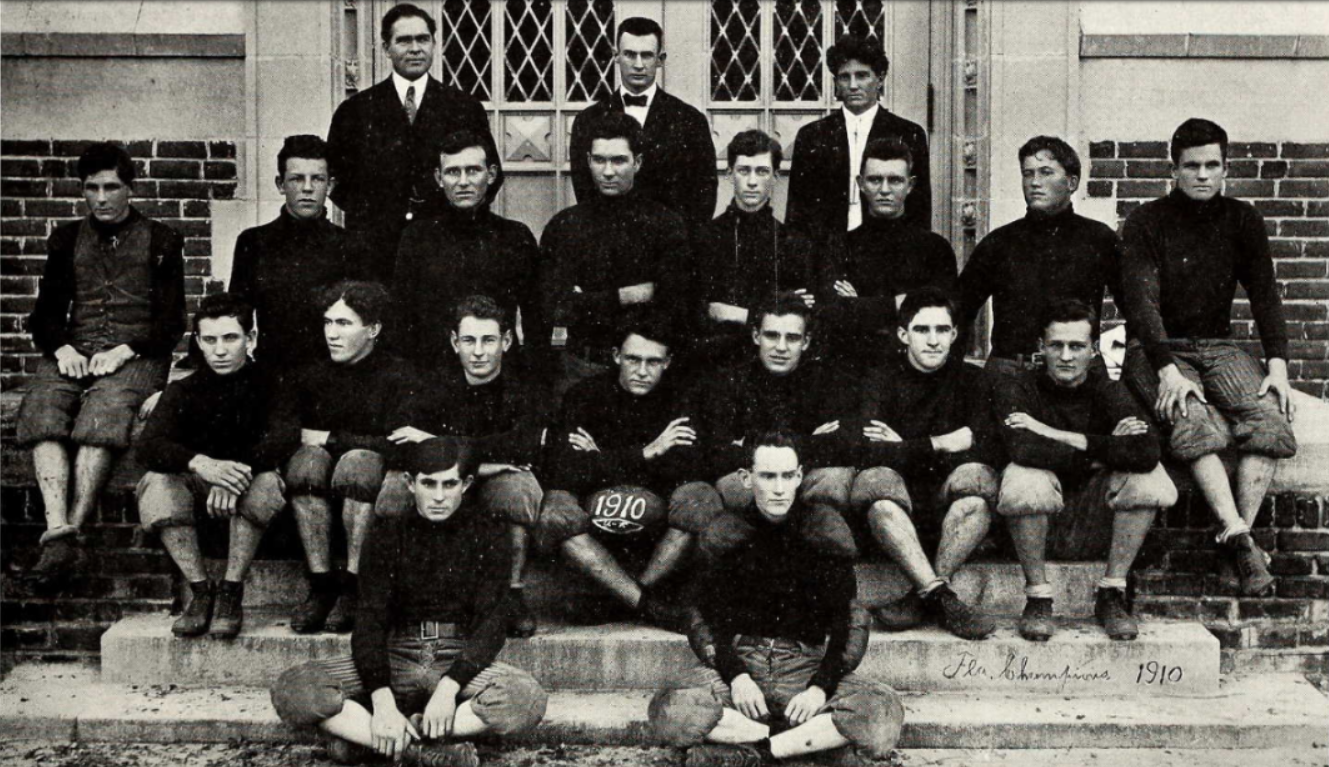
- Conference: Independent
- Record: 6–1
- Head coach: George E. Pyle (2nd season)
- Captain: Earle Taylor
- Home stadium: The Ballpark

1910 Southern college football independents records
	Conf.			Overall
Team	W	L	T	W		L		T
Central University		–		9	–	0	–	0
Louisiana Industrial		–		7	–	0	–	0
Stetson		–		3	–	0	–	0
Navy		–		8	–	0	–	1
North Carolina A&M		–		4	–	0	–	2
Spring Hill		–		3	–	0	–	1
Texas A&M		–		8	–	1	–	0
Arkansas		–		7	–	1	–	0
Florida		–		6	–	1	–	0
Baylor		–		6	–	1	–	1
Georgetown		–		6	–	1	–	1
Marshall		–		5	–	1	–	1
Kentucky State		–		7	–	2	–	0
Texas		–		6	–	2	–	0
Virginia		–		6	–	2	–	0
Southwestern Louisiana Industrial		–		6	–	2	–	1
Chattanooga		–		5	–	2	–	1
Kendall		–		2	–	1	–	1
Maryland		–		4	–	3	–	1
Oklahoma		–		4	–	2	–	1
Washington and Lee		–		4	–	3	–	0
South Carolina		–		4	–	4	–	0
Birmingham		–		3	–	3	–	1
VMI		–		3	–	3	–	1
Davidson		–		3	–	4	–	2
Oklahoma A&M		–		3	–	4	–	0
West Virginia		–		2	–	4	–	1
Catholic University		–		2	–	4	–	0
North Carolina		–		3	–	6	–	0
George Washington		–		2	–	2	–	2
Wake Forest		–		2	–	7	–	0
Delaware		–		1	–	2	–	2
Mississippi College		–		0	–	4	–	0
Southwest Texas State		–		0	–	4	–	0
Tulane		–		0	–	7	–	0

The 1910 Florida football team represented the University of Florida during the 1910 college football season. The season was George E. Pyle's second as the head coach of the University of Florida football team. Pyle's 1910 Florida football team finished its fifth varsity football season undefeated on its home field, with an overall record of 6–1.

== Before the season ==
The team was captained by Earle Taylor, the only five-time letterman in school history.

== Schedule ==
Date	Opponent	Site	Result
October 8	Gainesville Guards*	The Ballpark; Gainesville, FL	W 23–0
October 15	vs. Third District A&M*	Jacksonville, FL	W 52–0
October 22	at Mercer	Central City Park; Macon, GA	L 0–13
November 5	vs. The Citadel	Jacksonville, FL	W 6–2
November 12	at Rollins*	Winter Park, FL	W 38–0
November 19	College of Charleston*	The Ballpark; Gainesville, FL	W 34–0
November 26	at Columbia Athletic Club*	Lake City, FL	W 33–0
*Non-conference game

== Game summaries ==
=== Gainesville Guards ===
The season opened with a 23–0 defeat of the Gainesville Guards.

=== Georgia A&M ===
Florida defeated Third District A&M, 52–0.

=== Mercer ===
The season's only blemish was a 13–0 loss to the Mercer Baptists. It was Florida's fourth consecutive loss to Mercer. It took until the second half for Mercer to get going.

A former player Roy Corbett sent a letter to The Gainesville Sun congratulating the 1928 team and mentioned the Gators nickname coming from Neal "Bo Gator" Storter. Carl Van Ness's research also posits Storter as the name's origin. Storter himself denied the above and stated the nickname 'Gators' came when a Macon Telegraph reporter declared "Macon to be invaded by a bunch of alligators from Florida" before the game with Mercer in 1910.

The starting lineup was Swanson (left end), Wagner (left tackle), Price (left guard), Storter (center), Barker (right guard), Robles (right tackle), Boule (right end), Edgerton (quarterback), Tenney (left halfback), Taylor (right halfback), Vidal (fullback).

=== The Citadel ===
Florida faced The Citadel Bulldogs for the first time and won 6–2. Aside from the loss to Mercer, only The Citadel scored on the Gators when Dummy Taylor was trapped in the endzone for a safety. Dummy Taylor ran 55 yards for the touchdown.

=== Rollins ===
Florida beat the in-state rival, Rollins, 38–0, for the third consecutive meeting.

=== Charleston ===
Florida beat the College of Charleston, 34–0.

=== Columbia A. C. ===
To close the season, Florida defeated the Columbia Athletic Club 33–0, its third successive shutout and 30-point victory. The win for the Gainesville squad over it a Lake City institution, its former home, was the highlight of the season.

== Bibliography ==
- Carlson, Norm (2007). University of Florida Football Vault: The History of the Florida Gators. Atlanta, Georgia: Whitman Publishing, LLC. ISBN 978-0-7948-2298-9.
- McEwen, Tom (1974). The Gators: A Story of Florida Football. Huntsville, Alabama: The Strode Publishers. ISBN 0-87397-025-X.
