= 1910 Davidson football team =

American college football season

1910 Davidson football
- Conference: Independent
- Record: 5–2
- Head coach: Floyd M. Simmons (2nd season)
- Home stadium: Sprunt Athletic Field

1910 Southern college football independents records
	Conf.			Overall
Team	W	L	T	W		L		T
Central University		–		9	–	0	–	0
Louisiana Industrial		–		7	–	0	–	0
Stetson		–		3	–	0	–	0
Navy		–		8	–	0	–	1
North Carolina A&M		–		4	–	0	–	2
Spring Hill		–		3	–	0	–	1
Texas A&M		–		8	–	1	–	0
Arkansas		–		7	–	1	–	0
Florida		–		6	–	1	–	0
Baylor		–		6	–	1	–	1
Georgetown		–		6	–	1	–	1
Marshall		–		5	–	1	–	1
Kentucky State		–		7	–	2	–	0
Texas		–		6	–	2	–	0
Virginia		–		6	–	2	–	0
Southwestern Louisiana Industrial		–		6	–	2	–	1
Chattanooga		–		5	–	2	–	1
Kendall		–		2	–	1	–	1
Maryland		–		4	–	3	–	1
Oklahoma		–		4	–	2	–	1
Washington and Lee		–		4	–	3	–	0
South Carolina		–		4	–	4	–	0
Birmingham		–		3	–	3	–	1
VMI		–		3	–	3	–	1
Davidson		–		3	–	4	–	2
Oklahoma A&M		–		3	–	4	–	0
West Virginia		–		2	–	4	–	1
Catholic University		–		2	–	4	–	0
North Carolina		–		3	–	6	–	0
George Washington		–		2	–	2	–	2
Wake Forest		–		2	–	7	–	0
Delaware		–		1	–	2	–	2
Mississippi College		–		0	–	4	–	0
Southwest Texas State		–		0	–	4	–	0
Tulane		–		0	–	7	–	0

The 1910 Davidson football team was an American football team that represented the Davidson College as an independent during the 1910 college football season. In their second year under head coach Floyd M. Simmons, the team compiled a 5–2 record.

== Schedule ==
Date	Opponent	Site	Result	Attendance	Source
September 24	Catawba	Sprunt Athletic Field; Davidson, NC	W 23–0		
October 5	at VPI	Miles Field; Blacksburg, VA	L 6–16		
October 15	vs. North Carolina	Latta Park; Charlotte, NC	W 6–0	1,200	
October 22	at Washington and Lee	Wilson Field; Lexington, VA	L 12–14		
November 2	vs. College of Charleston*	State Fairgrounds; Columbia, SC	W 27–6		
November 12	South Carolina	Sprunt Athletic Field; Davidson, NC	W 53–0		
November 24	vs. Wake Forest	Latta Park; Charlotte, NC	W 32–0		
*Non-conference game
