= 1910 Washington and Lee Generals football team =

American college football season

1910 Washington and Lee Generals football
- Conference: Independent
- Record: 4–3
- Head coach: J. W. H. Pollard (1st season)
- Home stadium: Wilson Field

1910 Southern college football independents records
	Conf.			Overall
Team	W	L	T	W		L		T
Central University		–		9	–	0	–	0
Louisiana Industrial		–		7	–	0	–	0
Stetson		–		3	–	0	–	0
Navy		–		8	–	0	–	1
North Carolina A&M		–		4	–	0	–	2
Spring Hill		–		3	–	0	–	1
Texas A&M		–		8	–	1	–	0
Arkansas		–		7	–	1	–	0
Florida		–		6	–	1	–	0
Baylor		–		6	–	1	–	1
Georgetown		–		6	–	1	–	1
Marshall		–		5	–	1	–	1
Kentucky State		–		7	–	2	–	0
Texas		–		6	–	2	–	0
Virginia		–		6	–	2	–	0
Southwestern Louisiana Industrial		–		6	–	2	–	1
Chattanooga		–		5	–	2	–	1
Kendall		–		2	–	1	–	1
Maryland		–		4	–	3	–	1
Oklahoma		–		4	–	2	–	1
Washington and Lee		–		4	–	3	–	0
South Carolina		–		4	–	4	–	0
Birmingham		–		3	–	3	–	1
VMI		–		3	–	3	–	1
Davidson		–		3	–	4	–	2
Oklahoma A&M		–		3	–	4	–	0
West Virginia		–		2	–	4	–	1
Catholic University		–		2	–	4	–	0
North Carolina		–		3	–	6	–	0
George Washington		–		2	–	2	–	2
Wake Forest		–		2	–	7	–	0
Delaware		–		1	–	2	–	2
Mississippi College		–		0	–	4	–	0
Southwest Texas State		–		0	–	4	–	0
Tulane		–		0	–	7	–	0

The 1910 Washington and Lee Generals football team was an American football team that represented Washington and Lee University during the 1910 college football season as an independent. In their first year under head coach J. W. H. Pollard, the team compiled an overall record of 4–3.

== Schedule ==
Date	Opponent	Site	Result	Attendance	Source
October 1	Roanoke	Wilson Field; Lexington, VA	W 13–0		
October 8	Hampden–Sydney	Wilson Field; Lexington, VA	W 10–0		
October 15	at Georgetown	Georgetown Field; Washington, DC	L 0–52		
October 22	Davidson	Wilson Field; Lexington, VA	W 14–12		
October 29	vs. VPI	Fair Grounds; Roanoke, VA	L 0–23	2,500	
November 12	vs. North Carolina	Lafayette Field; Norfolk, VA	W 5–0		
November 24	at Alabama	Birmingham Fairgrounds; Birmingham, AL	L 0–9		
