= 1910 Oklahoma A&M Aggies football team =

American college football season

1910 Oklahoma A&M Aggies football
- Conference: Independent
- Record: 3–4
- Head coach: Paul J. Davis (2nd season)

1910 Southern college football independents records
| | Conf. | | | Overall |
| Team | W | L | T | W | | L | | T |
|---|---|---|---|---|---|---|---|---|
| Central University | | – | | 9 | – | 0 | – | 0 |
| Louisiana Industrial | | – | | 7 | – | 0 | – | 0 |
| Stetson | | – | | 3 | – | 0 | – | 0 |
| Navy | | – | | 8 | – | 0 | – | 1 |
| North Carolina A&M | | – | | 4 | – | 0 | – | 2 |
| Spring Hill | | – | | 3 | – | 0 | – | 1 |
| Texas A&M | | – | | 8 | – | 1 | – | 0 |
| Arkansas | | – | | 7 | – | 1 | – | 0 |
| Florida | | – | | 6 | – | 1 | – | 0 |
| Baylor | | – | | 6 | – | 1 | – | 1 |
| Georgetown | | – | | 6 | – | 1 | – | 1 |
| Marshall | | – | | 5 | – | 1 | – | 1 |
| Kentucky State | | – | | 7 | – | 2 | – | 0 |
| Texas | | – | | 6 | – | 2 | – | 0 |
| Virginia | | – | | 6 | – | 2 | – | 0 |
| Southwestern Louisiana Industrial | | – | | 6 | – | 2 | – | 1 |
| Chattanooga | | – | | 5 | – | 2 | – | 1 |
| Kendall | | – | | 2 | – | 1 | – | 1 |
| Maryland | | – | | 4 | – | 3 | – | 1 |
| Oklahoma | | – | | 4 | – | 2 | – | 1 |
| Washington and Lee | | – | | 4 | – | 3 | – | 0 |
| South Carolina | | – | | 4 | – | 4 | – | 0 |
| Birmingham | | – | | 3 | – | 3 | – | 1 |
| VMI | | – | | 3 | – | 3 | – | 1 |
| Davidson | | – | | 3 | – | 4 | – | 2 |
| Oklahoma A&M | | – | | 3 | – | 4 | – | 0 |
| West Virginia | | – | | 2 | – | 4 | – | 1 |
| Catholic University | | – | | 2 | – | 4 | – | 0 |
| North Carolina | | – | | 3 | – | 6 | – | 0 |
| George Washington | | – | | 2 | – | 2 | – | 2 |
| Wake Forest | | – | | 2 | – | 7 | – | 0 |
| Delaware | | – | | 1 | – | 2 | – | 2 |
| Mississippi College | | – | | 0 | – | 4 | – | 0 |
| Southwest Texas State | | – | | 0 | – | 4 | – | 0 |
| Tulane | | – | | 0 | – | 7 | – | 0 |

The 1910 Oklahoma A&M Aggies football team represented Oklahoma A&M College in the 1910 college football season. This was the 10th year of football at A&M and the second under Paul J. Davis. The Aggies played their home games in Stillwater, Oklahoma. They finished the season 3–4.

== Schedule ==
| Date | Opponent | Site | Result | Source |
|---|---|---|---|---|
| October 14 | Kingfisher | Stillwater, OK | W 35–0 | |
| October 21 | at Oklahoma | Norman, OK (Bedlam) | L 0–12 | |
| October 29 | at Southwestern (KS) | Winfield, KS | L 0–5 | |
| November 4 | at Phillips | Enid, OK | L 0–12 | |
| November 11 | at Epworth | Oklahoma City, OK | L 0–15 | |
| November 19 | Southwestern Oklahoma | Stillwater, OK | W 42–0 | |
| November 24 | Central State Normal | Stillwater, OK | W 52–0 | |
