= 1910 Oklahoma Sooners football team =

American college football season

1910 Oklahoma Sooners football
- Conference: Independent
- Record: 4–2–1
- Head coach: Bennie Owen (6th season)
- Captain: Cleve Thompson
- Home stadium: Boyd Field

1910 Southern college football independents records
| | Conf. | | | Overall |
| Team | W | L | T | W | | L | | T |
|---|---|---|---|---|---|---|---|---|
| Central University | | – | | 9 | – | 0 | – | 0 |
| Louisiana Industrial | | – | | 7 | – | 0 | – | 0 |
| Stetson | | – | | 3 | – | 0 | – | 0 |
| Navy | | – | | 8 | – | 0 | – | 1 |
| North Carolina A&M | | – | | 4 | – | 0 | – | 2 |
| Spring Hill | | – | | 3 | – | 0 | – | 1 |
| Texas A&M | | – | | 8 | – | 1 | – | 0 |
| Arkansas | | – | | 7 | – | 1 | – | 0 |
| Florida | | – | | 6 | – | 1 | – | 0 |
| Baylor | | – | | 6 | – | 1 | – | 1 |
| Georgetown | | – | | 6 | – | 1 | – | 1 |
| Marshall | | – | | 5 | – | 1 | – | 1 |
| Kentucky State | | – | | 7 | – | 2 | – | 0 |
| Texas | | – | | 6 | – | 2 | – | 0 |
| Virginia | | – | | 6 | – | 2 | – | 0 |
| Southwestern Louisiana Industrial | | – | | 6 | – | 2 | – | 1 |
| Chattanooga | | – | | 5 | – | 2 | – | 1 |
| Kendall | | – | | 2 | – | 1 | – | 1 |
| Maryland | | – | | 4 | – | 3 | – | 1 |
| Oklahoma | | – | | 4 | – | 2 | – | 1 |
| Washington and Lee | | – | | 4 | – | 3 | – | 0 |
| South Carolina | | – | | 4 | – | 4 | – | 0 |
| Birmingham | | – | | 3 | – | 3 | – | 1 |
| VMI | | – | | 3 | – | 3 | – | 1 |
| Davidson | | – | | 3 | – | 4 | – | 2 |
| Oklahoma A&M | | – | | 3 | – | 4 | – | 0 |
| West Virginia | | – | | 2 | – | 4 | – | 1 |
| Catholic University | | – | | 2 | – | 4 | – | 0 |
| North Carolina | | – | | 3 | – | 6 | – | 0 |
| George Washington | | – | | 2 | – | 2 | – | 2 |
| Wake Forest | | – | | 2 | – | 7 | – | 0 |
| Delaware | | – | | 1 | – | 2 | – | 2 |
| Mississippi College | | – | | 0 | – | 4 | – | 0 |
| Southwest Texas State | | – | | 0 | – | 4 | – | 0 |
| Tulane | | – | | 0 | – | 7 | – | 0 |

The 1910 Oklahoma Sooners football team represented the University of Oklahoma as an independent during the 1910 college football season. In their sixth year under head coach Bennie Owen, the Sooners compiled a 4–2–1 record, and outscored their opponents by a combined total of 163 to 31.

== Schedule ==
| Date | Opponent | Site | Result | Source |
|---|---|---|---|---|
| October 7 | at Kingfisher | Kingfisher, OK | W 66–0 | |
| October 14 | at Central State Normal | Edmond, OK | W 79–0 | |
| October 21 | Oklahoma A&M | Boyd Field; Norman, OK (rivalry) | W 12–0 | |
| October 28 | Missouri | Boyd Field; Norman, OK (rivalry) | L 0–26 | |
| November 12 | Kansas | Boyd Field; Norman, OK | L 0–2 | |
| November 24 | at Texas | Clark Field; Austin, TX (rivalry) | W 3–0 | |
| December 2 | Epworth | Norman, OK | T 3–3 | |
