= 1910 Wake Forest Baptists football team =

American college football season

1910 Wake Forest Baptists football
- Conference: Independent
- Record: 2–7
- Head coach: Reddy Rowe (1st season)
- Captain: Phil Utley

1910 Southern college football independents records
	Conf.			Overall
Team	W	L	T	W		L		T
Central University		–		9	–	0	–	0
Louisiana Industrial		–		7	–	0	–	0
Stetson		–		3	–	0	–	0
Navy		–		8	–	0	–	1
North Carolina A&M		–		4	–	0	–	2
Spring Hill		–		3	–	0	–	1
Texas A&M		–		8	–	1	–	0
Arkansas		–		7	–	1	–	0
Florida		–		6	–	1	–	0
Baylor		–		6	–	1	–	1
Georgetown		–		6	–	1	–	1
Marshall		–		5	–	1	–	1
Kentucky State		–		7	–	2	–	0
Texas		–		6	–	2	–	0
Virginia		–		6	–	2	–	0
Southwestern Louisiana Industrial		–		6	–	2	–	1
Chattanooga		–		5	–	2	–	1
Kendall		–		2	–	1	–	1
Maryland		–		4	–	3	–	1
Oklahoma		–		4	–	2	–	1
Washington and Lee		–		4	–	3	–	0
South Carolina		–		4	–	4	–	0
Birmingham		–		3	–	3	–	1
VMI		–		3	–	3	–	1
Davidson		–		3	–	4	–	2
Oklahoma A&M		–		3	–	4	–	0
West Virginia		–		2	–	4	–	1
Catholic University		–		2	–	4	–	0
North Carolina		–		3	–	6	–	0
George Washington		–		2	–	2	–	2
Wake Forest		–		2	–	7	–	0
Delaware		–		1	–	2	–	2
Mississippi College		–		0	–	4	–	0
Southwest Texas State		–		0	–	4	–	0
Tulane		–		0	–	7	–	0

The 1910 Wake Forest Baptists football team was an American football team that represented Wake Forest College as an independent during the 1910 college football season. In its first and only season under head coach Reddy Rowe, the team compiled a 2–7 record (0–5 in intercollegiate games) and was shut out in five of its nine games. The team played its home games in Wake Forest, North Carolina.

== Schedule ==
Date	Opponent	Site	Result	Attendance	Source
September 24	Warrenton High School	Wake Forest, NC	W 17–0		
October 8	Horner	Wake Forest, NC	W 28–0		
October 15	at Norfolk Artillery Blues	Norfolk, VA	L 0–31		
October 22	at North Carolina	Chapel Hill, NC (rivalry)	L 0–37		
October 27	at South Carolina	Columbia, SC	L 0–6	500	
October 29	at The Citadel	College Park Stadium; Charleston, SC	L 5–9		
November 12	vs. Training Ship Franklin	Durham, NC	L 0–11	1,500	
November 19	North Carolina A&M	Wake Forest, NC (rivalry)	L 3–28		
November 24	Davidson	Charlotte, NC	L 0–32		
