= 1910 Virginia Orange and Blue football team =

American college football season

1910 Virginia Orange and Blue football
- Conference: Independent
- Record: 6–2
- Head coach: Charles B. Crawford (1st season)
- Captain: Horace Geyer Jr.
- Home stadium: Madison Hall Field

1910 Southern college football independents records
| | Conf. | | | Overall |
| Team | W | L | T | W | | L | | T |
|---|---|---|---|---|---|---|---|---|
| Central University | | – | | 9 | – | 0 | – | 0 |
| Louisiana Industrial | | – | | 7 | – | 0 | – | 0 |
| Stetson | | – | | 3 | – | 0 | – | 0 |
| Navy | | – | | 8 | – | 0 | – | 1 |
| North Carolina A&M | | – | | 4 | – | 0 | – | 2 |
| Spring Hill | | – | | 3 | – | 0 | – | 1 |
| Texas A&M | | – | | 8 | – | 1 | – | 0 |
| Arkansas | | – | | 7 | – | 1 | – | 0 |
| Florida | | – | | 6 | – | 1 | – | 0 |
| Baylor | | – | | 6 | – | 1 | – | 1 |
| Georgetown | | – | | 6 | – | 1 | – | 1 |
| Marshall | | – | | 5 | – | 1 | – | 1 |
| Kentucky State | | – | | 7 | – | 2 | – | 0 |
| Texas | | – | | 6 | – | 2 | – | 0 |
| Virginia | | – | | 6 | – | 2 | – | 0 |
| Southwestern Louisiana Industrial | | – | | 6 | – | 2 | – | 1 |
| Chattanooga | | – | | 5 | – | 2 | – | 1 |
| Kendall | | – | | 2 | – | 1 | – | 1 |
| Maryland | | – | | 4 | – | 3 | – | 1 |
| Oklahoma | | – | | 4 | – | 2 | – | 1 |
| Washington and Lee | | – | | 4 | – | 3 | – | 0 |
| South Carolina | | – | | 4 | – | 4 | – | 0 |
| Birmingham | | – | | 3 | – | 3 | – | 1 |
| VMI | | – | | 3 | – | 3 | – | 1 |
| Davidson | | – | | 3 | – | 4 | – | 2 |
| Oklahoma A&M | | – | | 3 | – | 4 | – | 0 |
| West Virginia | | – | | 2 | – | 4 | – | 1 |
| Catholic University | | – | | 2 | – | 4 | – | 0 |
| North Carolina | | – | | 3 | – | 6 | – | 0 |
| George Washington | | – | | 2 | – | 2 | – | 2 |
| Wake Forest | | – | | 2 | – | 7 | – | 0 |
| Delaware | | – | | 1 | – | 2 | – | 2 |
| Mississippi College | | – | | 0 | – | 4 | – | 0 |
| Southwest Texas State | | – | | 0 | – | 4 | – | 0 |
| Tulane | | – | | 0 | – | 7 | – | 0 |

The 1910 Virginia Orange and Blue football team represented the University of Virginia as an independent during the 1910 college football season. Led by Charles B. Crawford in his first and only season as head coach, the Orange and Blue compiled a record of 6–2.

== Schedule ==
| Date | Time | Opponent | Site | Result | Attendance | Source |
|---|---|---|---|---|---|---|
| September 24 | | William & Mary | Madison Hall Field; Charlottesville, VA | W 10–0 | | |
| October 1 | | Randolph–Macon | Madison Hall Field; Charlottesville, VA | W 17–0 | | |
| October 8 | | Roanoke | Madison Hall Field; Charlottesville, VA | W 21–0 | | |
| October 15 | | St. John's (MD) | Madison Hall Field; Charlottesville, VA | W 29–0 | | |
| October 22 | | VMI | Madison Hall Field; Charlottesville, VA | W 28–0 | | |
| November 5 | 3:00 p.m. | vs. Carlisle | American League Park; Washington, DC | L 5–22 | | |
| November 12 | | at Georgetown | Georgetown Field; Washington, DC | L 0–15 | 8,000 | |
| November 24 | | vs. North Carolina | Broad Street Park; Richmond, VA (South's Oldest Rivalry) | W 7–0 | 12,000 | |
