= 1910 Texas A&M Aggies football team =

American college football season

1910 Texas A&M Aggies football
- Conference: Independent
- Record: 8–1
- Head coach: Charley Moran (2nd season)
- Home stadium: Kyle Field

1910 Southern college football independents records
	Conf.			Overall
Team	W	L	T	W		L		T
Central University		–		9	–	0	–	0
Louisiana Industrial		–		7	–	0	–	0
Stetson		–		3	–	0	–	0
Navy		–		8	–	0	–	1
North Carolina A&M		–		4	–	0	–	2
Spring Hill		–		3	–	0	–	1
Texas A&M		–		8	–	1	–	0
Arkansas		–		7	–	1	–	0
Florida		–		6	–	1	–	0
Baylor		–		6	–	1	–	1
Georgetown		–		6	–	1	–	1
Marshall		–		5	–	1	–	1
Kentucky State		–		7	–	2	–	0
Texas		–		6	–	2	–	0
Virginia		–		6	–	2	–	0
Southwestern Louisiana Industrial		–		6	–	2	–	1
Chattanooga		–		5	–	2	–	1
Kendall		–		2	–	1	–	1
Maryland		–		4	–	3	–	1
Oklahoma		–		4	–	2	–	1
Washington and Lee		–		4	–	3	–	0
South Carolina		–		4	–	4	–	0
Birmingham		–		3	–	3	–	1
VMI		–		3	–	3	–	1
Davidson		–		3	–	4	–	2
Oklahoma A&M		–		3	–	4	–	0
West Virginia		–		2	–	4	–	1
Catholic University		–		2	–	4	–	0
North Carolina		–		3	–	6	–	0
George Washington		–		2	–	2	–	2
Wake Forest		–		2	–	7	–	0
Delaware		–		1	–	2	–	2
Mississippi College		–		0	–	4	–	0
Southwest Texas State		–		0	–	4	–	0
Tulane		–		0	–	7	–	0

The 1910 Texas A&M Aggies football team represented the Agricultural and Mechanical College of Texas—now known as Texas A&M University—as in independent during the 1910 college football season. Led by second-year head coach Charley Moran, the Aggies finished the season with a record of 8–1.

== Schedule ==
Date	Opponent	Site	Result	Attendance	Source
October 10	Marshall School	Kyle Field; College Station, TX	W 42–0		
October 11	Austin	Kyle Field; College Station, TX	W 27–5		
October 15	TCU	Kyle Field; College Station, TX (rivalry)	W 35–0		
October 20	Transylvania	Kyle Field; College Station, TX	W 33–0		
October 29	at Arkansas	The Hill; Fayetteville, AR (rivalry)	L 5–0		
November 1	at TCU	Haines Park; Fort Worth, TX	W 23–6		
November 14	vs. Texas	West End Park; Houston, TX (rivalry)	W 14–8		
November 18	Southwestern (TX)	Kyle Field; College Station, TX	W 6–0		
November 24	vs. Tulane	West End Park; Houston, TX	W 17–0	3,000	
