= 1910 Chattanooga Moccasins football team =

American college football season

1910 Chattanooga Moccasins football
- Conference: Independent
- Record: 5–2–1
- Head coach: Leslie Stauffer (1st season)
- Captain: Tom Leonard
- Home stadium: Chamberlain Field

1910 Southern college football independents records
| | Conf. | | | Overall |
| Team | W | L | T | W | | L | | T |
|---|---|---|---|---|---|---|---|---|
| Central University | | – | | 9 | – | 0 | – | 0 |
| Louisiana Industrial | | – | | 7 | – | 0 | – | 0 |
| Stetson | | – | | 3 | – | 0 | – | 0 |
| Navy | | – | | 8 | – | 0 | – | 1 |
| North Carolina A&M | | – | | 4 | – | 0 | – | 2 |
| Spring Hill | | – | | 3 | – | 0 | – | 1 |
| Texas A&M | | – | | 8 | – | 1 | – | 0 |
| Arkansas | | – | | 7 | – | 1 | – | 0 |
| Florida | | – | | 6 | – | 1 | – | 0 |
| Baylor | | – | | 6 | – | 1 | – | 1 |
| Georgetown | | – | | 6 | – | 1 | – | 1 |
| Marshall | | – | | 5 | – | 1 | – | 1 |
| Kentucky State | | – | | 7 | – | 2 | – | 0 |
| Texas | | – | | 6 | – | 2 | – | 0 |
| Virginia | | – | | 6 | – | 2 | – | 0 |
| Southwestern Louisiana Industrial | | – | | 6 | – | 2 | – | 1 |
| Chattanooga | | – | | 5 | – | 2 | – | 1 |
| Kendall | | – | | 2 | – | 1 | – | 1 |
| Maryland | | – | | 4 | – | 3 | – | 1 |
| Oklahoma | | – | | 4 | – | 2 | – | 1 |
| Washington and Lee | | – | | 4 | – | 3 | – | 0 |
| South Carolina | | – | | 4 | – | 4 | – | 0 |
| Birmingham | | – | | 3 | – | 3 | – | 1 |
| VMI | | – | | 3 | – | 3 | – | 1 |
| Davidson | | – | | 3 | – | 4 | – | 2 |
| Oklahoma A&M | | – | | 3 | – | 4 | – | 0 |
| West Virginia | | – | | 2 | – | 4 | – | 1 |
| Catholic University | | – | | 2 | – | 4 | – | 0 |
| North Carolina | | – | | 3 | – | 6 | – | 0 |
| George Washington | | – | | 2 | – | 2 | – | 2 |
| Wake Forest | | – | | 2 | – | 7 | – | 0 |
| Delaware | | – | | 1 | – | 2 | – | 2 |
| Mississippi College | | – | | 0 | – | 4 | – | 0 |
| Southwest Texas State | | – | | 0 | – | 4 | – | 0 |
| Tulane | | – | | 0 | – | 7 | – | 0 |

The 1910 Chattanooga Moccasins football team represented the University of Chattanooga as an independent during the 1910 college football season. The team finished its eight-game schedule with a record of 5–2–1.

== Schedule ==
| Date | Opponent | Site | Result | Source |
|---|---|---|---|---|
| October 8 | at Georgia Tech | Piedmont Park; Atlanta, GA | L 0–18 | |
| October 22 | Birmingham | Chamberlain Field; Chattanooga, TN | W 28–0 | |
| October 29 | 11th Cavalry | Chamberlain Field; Chattanooga, TN | L 0–3 | |
| November 5 | at Mercer | Central City Park; Macon, GA | W 6–0 | |
| November 9 | 11th Cavalry | Chamberlain Field; Chattanooga, TN | W 19–6 | |
| November 12 | Howard (AL) | Chamberlain Field; Chattanooga, TN | W 56–0 | |
| November 20 | at Tennessee | Waite Field; Knoxville, TN | T 6–6 | |
| November 24 | Maryville (TN) | Chamberlain Field; Chattanooga, TN | W 28–11 | |
