= 1910 Kendall Orange and Black football team =

American college football season

1910 Kendall Orange and Black football
- Conference: Independent
- Record: 2–1–1
- Head coach: Sam P. McBirney

1910 Southern college football independents records
	Conf.			Overall
Team	W	L	T	W		L		T
Central University		–		9	–	0	–	0
Louisiana Industrial		–		7	–	0	–	0
Stetson		–		3	–	0	–	0
Navy		–		8	–	0	–	1
North Carolina A&M		–		4	–	0	–	2
Spring Hill		–		3	–	0	–	1
Texas A&M		–		8	–	1	–	0
Arkansas		–		7	–	1	–	0
Florida		–		6	–	1	–	0
Baylor		–		6	–	1	–	1
Georgetown		–		6	–	1	–	1
Marshall		–		5	–	1	–	1
Kentucky State		–		7	–	2	–	0
Texas		–		6	–	2	–	0
Virginia		–		6	–	2	–	0
Southwestern Louisiana Industrial		–		6	–	2	–	1
Chattanooga		–		5	–	2	–	1
Kendall		–		2	–	1	–	1
Maryland		–		4	–	3	–	1
Oklahoma		–		4	–	2	–	1
Washington and Lee		–		4	–	3	–	0
South Carolina		–		4	–	4	–	0
Birmingham		–		3	–	3	–	1
VMI		–		3	–	3	–	1
Davidson		–		3	–	4	–	2
Oklahoma A&M		–		3	–	4	–	0
West Virginia		–		2	–	4	–	1
Catholic University		–		2	–	4	–	0
North Carolina		–		3	–	6	–	0
George Washington		–		2	–	2	–	2
Wake Forest		–		2	–	7	–	0
Delaware		–		1	–	2	–	2
Mississippi College		–		0	–	4	–	0
Southwest Texas State		–		0	–	4	–	0
Tulane		–		0	–	7	–	0

The 1910 Kendall Orange and Black football team represented Henry Kendall College (later renamed the University of Tulsa) during the 1910 college football season. The team compiled a 2–1–1 record and was outscored by its opponents by a total of 11 to 10. The team did not play any intercollegiate football games, as its four games were played against local high schools from Broken Arrow, Claremore and Tulsa.

== Schedule ==
Date	Opponent	Site	Result
October 14	at Broken Arrow High School	Broken Arrow, OK	L 6–11
November 11	at Claremore High School	Claremore, OK	W 3–0
November 18	Mounds High	Tulsa, OK	W (no score recorded)
