= 1910 George Washington Hatchetites football team =

American college football season

1910 George Washington Hatchetites football
- Conference: Independent
- Record: 2–2–2
- Head coach: Paul Magoffin (1st season)

1910 Southern college football independents records
	Conf.			Overall
Team	W	L	T	W		L		T
Central University		–		9	–	0	–	0
Louisiana Industrial		–		7	–	0	–	0
Stetson		–		3	–	0	–	0
Navy		–		8	–	0	–	1
North Carolina A&M		–		4	–	0	–	2
Spring Hill		–		3	–	0	–	1
Texas A&M		–		8	–	1	–	0
Arkansas		–		7	–	1	–	0
Florida		–		6	–	1	–	0
Baylor		–		6	–	1	–	1
Georgetown		–		6	–	1	–	1
Marshall		–		5	–	1	–	1
Kentucky State		–		7	–	2	–	0
Texas		–		6	–	2	–	0
Virginia		–		6	–	2	–	0
Southwestern Louisiana Industrial		–		6	–	2	–	1
Chattanooga		–		5	–	2	–	1
Kendall		–		2	–	1	–	1
Maryland		–		4	–	3	–	1
Oklahoma		–		4	–	2	–	1
Washington and Lee		–		4	–	3	–	0
South Carolina		–		4	–	4	–	0
Birmingham		–		3	–	3	–	1
VMI		–		3	–	3	–	1
Davidson		–		3	–	4	–	2
Oklahoma A&M		–		3	–	4	–	0
West Virginia		–		2	–	4	–	1
Catholic University		–		2	–	4	–	0
North Carolina		–		3	–	6	–	0
George Washington		–		2	–	2	–	2
Wake Forest		–		2	–	7	–	0
Delaware		–		1	–	2	–	2
Mississippi College		–		0	–	4	–	0
Southwest Texas State		–		0	–	4	–	0
Tulane		–		0	–	7	–	0

The 1910 George Washington Hatchetites Colonials football team was an American football team that represented George Washington University as an independent during the 1910 college football season. In their first season under head coach Paul Magoffin, the team compiled a 2–2–2 record.

== Schedule ==
Date	Opponent	Site	Result	Attendance	Source
October 8	Fredericksburg College	Union League Park; Washington, DC	W 5–0		
October 15	Washington College	American League Park; Washington, DC	T 0–0		
October 19	Maryland	American League Park; Washington, DC	L 0–6		
October 22	St. John's (MD)	American League Park; Washington, DC	T 0–0		
October 29	at Richmond	Richmond, VA	W 21–15	2,000	
November 12	at VPI	Lynchburg, VA	L 5–16		
