= 1910 North Carolina Tar Heels football team =

American college football season

1910 North Carolina Tar Heels football
- Conference: Independent
- Record: 3–6
- Head coach: Arthur Brides (2nd season)
- Captain: Earl Asbury Thompson
- Home stadium: Campus Athletic Field (II)

1910 Southern college football independents records
	Conf.			Overall
Team	W	L	T	W		L		T
Central University		–		9	–	0	–	0
Louisiana Industrial		–		7	–	0	–	0
Stetson		–		3	–	0	–	0
Navy		–		8	–	0	–	1
North Carolina A&M		–		4	–	0	–	2
Spring Hill		–		3	–	0	–	1
Texas A&M		–		8	–	1	–	0
Arkansas		–		7	–	1	–	0
Florida		–		6	–	1	–	0
Baylor		–		6	–	1	–	1
Georgetown		–		6	–	1	–	1
Marshall		–		5	–	1	–	1
Kentucky State		–		7	–	2	–	0
Texas		–		6	–	2	–	0
Virginia		–		6	–	2	–	0
Southwestern Louisiana Industrial		–		6	–	2	–	1
Chattanooga		–		5	–	2	–	1
Kendall		–		2	–	1	–	1
Maryland		–		4	–	3	–	1
Oklahoma		–		4	–	2	–	1
Washington and Lee		–		4	–	3	–	0
South Carolina		–		4	–	4	–	0
Birmingham		–		3	–	3	–	1
VMI		–		3	–	3	–	1
Davidson		–		3	–	4	–	2
Oklahoma A&M		–		3	–	4	–	0
West Virginia		–		2	–	4	–	1
Catholic University		–		2	–	4	–	0
North Carolina		–		3	–	6	–	0
George Washington		–		2	–	2	–	2
Wake Forest		–		2	–	7	–	0
Delaware		–		1	–	2	–	2
Mississippi College		–		0	–	4	–	0
Southwest Texas State		–		0	–	4	–	0
Tulane		–		0	–	7	–	0

The 1910 North Carolina Tar Heels football team represented the University of North Carolina in the 1910 college football season. The team captain of the 1910 season was Earl Asbury Thompson. This season was part of the early era of Tar Heels football, long before conference play and postseason bowls became central to college football.

== Schedule ==
Date	Time	Opponent	Site	Result	Attendance	Source
October 1		VMI	Campus Athletic Field (II); Chapel Hill, NC	W 6–0		
October 8	3:00 p.m.	at Kentucky State College	Stoll Field; Lexington, KY	L 0–11		
October 15	3:30 p.m.	vs. Davidson	Latta Park; Charlotte, NC	L 0–6	1,200	
October 22		Wake Forest	Campus Athletic Field (II); Chapel Hill, NC (rivalry)	W 37–0		
October 29	3:00 p.m.	at Georgetown	Georgetown Field; Washington, DC	L 0–12		
November 5	3:15 p.m.	vs. VPI	Broad Street Park (I); Richmond, VA	L 0–20	3,000	
November 12		vs. Washington and Lee	Lafayette Field; Norfolk, VA	L 0–5		
November 19	3:30 p.m.	vs. South Carolina	East Durham Ballpark; Durham, NC (rivalry)	W 23–6		
November 24	2:30 p.m.	vs. Virginia	Broad Street Park (I); Richmond, VA (South's Oldest Rivalry)	L 0–7	15,000	
