= 1910 Marshall Thundering Herd football team =

American college football season

1910 Marshall Thundering Herd football
- Conference: Independent
- Record: 5–1–1
- Head coach: Boyd Chambers (2nd season)
- Captain: John Farmer
- Home stadium: Central Field

1910 Southern college football independents records
	Conf.			Overall
Team	W	L	T	W		L		T
Central University		–		9	–	0	–	0
Louisiana Industrial		–		7	–	0	–	0
Stetson		–		3	–	0	–	0
Navy		–		8	–	0	–	1
North Carolina A&M		–		4	–	0	–	2
Spring Hill		–		3	–	0	–	1
Texas A&M		–		8	–	1	–	0
Arkansas		–		7	–	1	–	0
Florida		–		6	–	1	–	0
Baylor		–		6	–	1	–	1
Georgetown		–		6	–	1	–	1
Marshall		–		5	–	1	–	1
Kentucky State		–		7	–	2	–	0
Texas		–		6	–	2	–	0
Virginia		–		6	–	2	–	0
Southwestern Louisiana Industrial		–		6	–	2	–	1
Chattanooga		–		5	–	2	–	1
Kendall		–		2	–	1	–	1
Maryland		–		4	–	3	–	1
Oklahoma		–		4	–	2	–	1
Washington and Lee		–		4	–	3	–	0
South Carolina		–		4	–	4	–	0
Birmingham		–		3	–	3	–	1
VMI		–		3	–	3	–	1
Davidson		–		3	–	4	–	2
Oklahoma A&M		–		3	–	4	–	0
West Virginia		–		2	–	4	–	1
Catholic University		–		2	–	4	–	0
North Carolina		–		3	–	6	–	0
George Washington		–		2	–	2	–	2
Wake Forest		–		2	–	7	–	0
Delaware		–		1	–	2	–	2
Mississippi College		–		0	–	4	–	0
Southwest Texas State		–		0	–	4	–	0
Tulane		–		0	–	7	–	0

The 1910 Marshall Thundering Herd football team represented Marshall College (now Marshall University) as an independent during the 1910 college football season. Marshall posted a 5–1–1 record, outscoring its opposition 91–14. Home games were played on a campus field called "Central Field" which is presently Campus Commons.

== Schedule ==
Date	Opponent	Site	Result
October 8	Charleston HS	Central Field; Huntington, WV	W 28–0
October 15	vs. West Virginia Wesleyan	Grafton, WV	L 0–5
October 22	at Morris Harvey	Charleston, WV	T 0–0
October 29	Davis & Elkins	Central Field; Huntington, WV	W 6–3
November 2	at Glenville	Glenville, WV	W 9–0
November 12	Kentucky Wesleyan	Central Field; Huntington, WV	W 40–0
November 24	Morris Harvey^{†}	Central Field; Huntington, WV	W 8–6
^{†}Homecoming
