= 1910 Tulane Olive and Blue football team =

American college football season

1910 Tulane Olive and Blue football
- Conference: Independent
- Record: 0–7
- Head coach: Appleton A. Mason (1st season)
- Captain: N. W. Sentelle
- Home stadium: First Tulane Stadium

1910 Southern college football independents records
	Conf.			Overall
Team	W	L	T	W		L		T
Central University		–		9	–	0	–	0
Louisiana Industrial		–		7	–	0	–	0
Stetson		–		3	–	0	–	0
Navy		–		8	–	0	–	1
North Carolina A&M		–		4	–	0	–	2
Spring Hill		–		3	–	0	–	1
Texas A&M		–		8	–	1	–	0
Arkansas		–		7	–	1	–	0
Florida		–		6	–	1	–	0
Baylor		–		6	–	1	–	1
Georgetown		–		6	–	1	–	1
Marshall		–		5	–	1	–	1
Kentucky State		–		7	–	2	–	0
Texas		–		6	–	2	–	0
Virginia		–		6	–	2	–	0
Southwestern Louisiana Industrial		–		6	–	2	–	1
Chattanooga		–		5	–	2	–	1
Kendall		–		2	–	1	–	1
Maryland		–		4	–	3	–	1
Oklahoma		–		4	–	2	–	1
Washington and Lee		–		4	–	3	–	0
South Carolina		–		4	–	4	–	0
Birmingham		–		3	–	3	–	1
VMI		–		3	–	3	–	1
Davidson		–		3	–	4	–	2
Oklahoma A&M		–		3	–	4	–	0
West Virginia		–		2	–	4	–	1
Catholic University		–		2	–	4	–	0
North Carolina		–		3	–	6	–	0
George Washington		–		2	–	2	–	2
Wake Forest		–		2	–	7	–	0
Delaware		–		1	–	2	–	2
Mississippi College		–		0	–	4	–	0
Southwest Texas State		–		0	–	4	–	0
Tulane		–		0	–	7	–	0

The 1910 Tulane Olive and Blue football team was an American football team that represented Tulane University as an independent during the 1910 college football season. In its first year under head coach Appleton A. Mason, Tulane compiled a 0–7 record.

== Schedule ==
Date	Opponent	Site	Result	Attendance	Source
October 13	Ole Miss	Tulane Stadium; New Orleans, LA (rivalry)	L 0–16		
October 26	at Central University	Cheek Field; Danville, KY	L 0–35		
October 29	at Kentucky State College*	Stoll Field; Lexington, KY	L 3–10		
November 5	Mississippi A&M	Tulane Stadium; New Orleans, LA	L 0–10		
November 12	vs. Auburn	Harrison County Fairgrounds; Gulfport, MS (rivalry)	L 0–33		
November 19	Alabama	Tulane Stadium; New Orleans, LA	L 3–5		
November 24	vs. Texas A&M*	West End Park; Houston, TX	L 0–17	3,000	
*Non-conference game
