= 1910 Arkansas Razorbacks football team =

American college football season

1910 Arkansas Razorbacks football
- Conference: Independent
- Record: 7–1
- Head coach: Hugo Bezdek (3rd season)
- Captain: Steve Creekmore
- Home stadium: The Hill

1910 Southern college football independents records
	Conf.			Overall
Team	W	L	T	W		L		T
Central University		–		9	–	0	–	0
Louisiana Industrial		–		7	–	0	–	0
Stetson		–		3	–	0	–	0
Navy		–		8	–	0	–	1
North Carolina A&M		–		4	–	0	–	2
Spring Hill		–		3	–	0	–	1
Texas A&M		–		8	–	1	–	0
Arkansas		–		7	–	1	–	0
Florida		–		6	–	1	–	0
Baylor		–		6	–	1	–	1
Georgetown		–		6	–	1	–	1
Marshall		–		5	–	1	–	1
Kentucky State		–		7	–	2	–	0
Texas		–		6	–	2	–	0
Virginia		–		6	–	2	–	0
Southwestern Louisiana Industrial		–		6	–	2	–	1
Chattanooga		–		5	–	2	–	1
Kendall		–		2	–	1	–	1
Maryland		–		4	–	3	–	1
Oklahoma		–		4	–	2	–	1
Washington and Lee		–		4	–	3	–	0
South Carolina		–		4	–	4	–	0
Birmingham		–		3	–	3	–	1
VMI		–		3	–	3	–	1
Davidson		–		3	–	4	–	2
Oklahoma A&M		–		3	–	4	–	0
West Virginia		–		2	–	4	–	1
Catholic University		–		2	–	4	–	0
North Carolina		–		3	–	6	–	0
George Washington		–		2	–	2	–	2
Wake Forest		–		2	–	7	–	0
Delaware		–		1	–	2	–	2
Mississippi College		–		0	–	4	–	0
Southwest Texas State		–		0	–	4	–	0
Tulane		–		0	–	7	–	0

The 1910 Arkansas Razorbacks football team represented the University of Arkansas during the 1910 college football season. In their third year under head coach Hugo Bezdek, the Razorbacks compiled a 7–1 record, shut out five of eight opponents, and outscored all opponents by a combined total of 221 to 19.

The 1910 seasons was the first in which the Arkansas football team was nicknamed "Razorbacks" instead of Cardinals. According to team lore, the change was inspired when coach Bezdek congratulated his undefeated 1909 team by saying they "fought like a band of wild razorback hogs". However, the razorback was gaining fame by 1906 as an indigenous Arkansan hog "that has no fear or reason", and there are published accounts of the nickname being in use for the football team well prior to the 1910 season. Also, in March 1910, the Arkansas Land Congress adopted a resolution to advertise the State of Arkansas by sending one of the state's razor back hogs on a cross-country publicity tour to refute the saying that "even hogs cannot be raised in Arkansas." One source suggests the nickname dates to 1905.

On October 22, 1910, Texas Southwestern scored to lead 12–8 with less than two minutes to play. On the ensuing kickoff return, Steve Creekmore threw a lateral pass all the way across field to Russell May who went down the sideline 75 yards for a touchdown and the 13–12 victory. Touchdowns were worth five points in 1910.

== Schedule ==
Date	Time	Opponent	Site	Result	Attendance	Source
October 1		Drury	The Hill; Fayetteville, AR	W 33–0		
October 8		Henderson	The Hill; Fayetteville, AR	W 63–0		
October 15		Kansas State	The Hill; Fayetteville, AR	L 0–5		
October 22		Southwestern (TX)	The Hill; Fayetteville, AR	W 13–12		
October 29		Texas A&M	The Hill; Fayetteville, AR (rivalry)	W 5–0		
November 5	2:45 p.m.	at Washington University	Francis Field; St. Louis, MO	W 50–0	2,000	
November 12		Missouri Mines	The Hill; Fayetteville, AR	W 6–2		
November 24		LSU	West End Park; Little Rock, AR (rivalry)	W 51–0		
