= 1910 Mississippi College Collegians football team =

American college football season

1910 Mississippi College Collegians football
- Conference: Independent
- Record: 0–4
- Head coach: Dale E. Chadwick (1st season)

1910 Southern college football independents records
	Conf.			Overall
Team	W	L	T	W		L		T
Central University		–		9	–	0	–	0
Louisiana Industrial		–		7	–	0	–	0
Stetson		–		3	–	0	–	0
Navy		–		8	–	0	–	1
North Carolina A&M		–		4	–	0	–	2
Spring Hill		–		3	–	0	–	1
Texas A&M		–		8	–	1	–	0
Arkansas		–		7	–	1	–	0
Florida		–		6	–	1	–	0
Baylor		–		6	–	1	–	1
Georgetown		–		6	–	1	–	1
Marshall		–		5	–	1	–	1
Kentucky State		–		7	–	2	–	0
Texas		–		6	–	2	–	0
Virginia		–		6	–	2	–	0
Southwestern Louisiana Industrial		–		6	–	2	–	1
Chattanooga		–		5	–	2	–	1
Kendall		–		2	–	1	–	1
Maryland		–		4	–	3	–	1
Oklahoma		–		4	–	2	–	1
Washington and Lee		–		4	–	3	–	0
South Carolina		–		4	–	4	–	0
Birmingham		–		3	–	3	–	1
VMI		–		3	–	3	–	1
Davidson		–		3	–	4	–	2
Oklahoma A&M		–		3	–	4	–	0
West Virginia		–		2	–	4	–	1
Catholic University		–		2	–	4	–	0
North Carolina		–		3	–	6	–	0
George Washington		–		2	–	2	–	2
Wake Forest		–		2	–	7	–	0
Delaware		–		1	–	2	–	2
Mississippi College		–		0	–	4	–	0
Southwest Texas State		–		0	–	4	–	0
Tulane		–		0	–	7	–	0

The 1910 Mississippi College Collegians football team was an American football team that represented Mississippi College as an independent in the 1910 college football season. Led by Dale E. Chadwick in his first season as head coach, the team compiled an overall record of 0–4.

== Schedule ==
Date	Opponent	Site	Result	Source
October 1	at Mississippi A&M	Hardy Field; Starkville, MS	L 0–24	
October 8	Louisiana Industrial	Clinton, MS	L 0–6	
October 15	at LSU	State Field; Baton Rouge, LA	L 0–40	
October 22	Ole Miss	Clinton, MS	L 0–24	
