= 1910 Navy Midshipmen football team =

American college football season

1910 Navy Midshipmen football
- Conference: Independent
- Record: 8–0–1
- Head coach: Frank Berrien (3rd season)
- Captain: T. Starr King
- Home stadium: Worden Field

1910 Southern college football independents records
	Conf.			Overall
Team	W	L	T	W		L		T
Central University		–		9	–	0	–	0
Louisiana Industrial		–		7	–	0	–	0
Stetson		–		3	–	0	–	0
Navy		–		8	–	0	–	1
North Carolina A&M		–		4	–	0	–	2
Spring Hill		–		3	–	0	–	1
Texas A&M		–		8	–	1	–	0
Arkansas		–		7	–	1	–	0
Florida		–		6	–	1	–	0
Baylor		–		6	–	1	–	1
Georgetown		–		6	–	1	–	1
Marshall		–		5	–	1	–	1
Kentucky State		–		7	–	2	–	0
Texas		–		6	–	2	–	0
Virginia		–		6	–	2	–	0
Southwestern Louisiana Industrial		–		6	–	2	–	1
Chattanooga		–		5	–	2	–	1
Kendall		–		2	–	1	–	1
Maryland		–		4	–	3	–	1
Oklahoma		–		4	–	2	–	1
Washington and Lee		–		4	–	3	–	0
South Carolina		–		4	–	4	–	0
Birmingham		–		3	–	3	–	1
VMI		–		3	–	3	–	1
Davidson		–		3	–	4	–	2
Oklahoma A&M		–		3	–	4	–	0
West Virginia		–		2	–	4	–	1
Catholic University		–		2	–	4	–	0
North Carolina		–		3	–	6	–	0
George Washington		–		2	–	2	–	2
Wake Forest		–		2	–	7	–	0
Delaware		–		1	–	2	–	2
Mississippi College		–		0	–	4	–	0
Southwest Texas State		–		0	–	4	–	0
Tulane		–		0	–	7	–	0

The 1910 Navy Midshipmen football team represented the United States Naval Academy during the 1910 college football season. The team compiled an undefeated 8–0–1 record and were not scored upon, having defeated all nine opponents by a combined score of 99 to 0.

The annual Army–Navy Game was played on November 26, 1910, at Franklin Field in Philadelphia. After initially missing seven attempts at field goal, Navy won by a 3 to 0 score on a kick by Jack Dalton.

Two players from the 1910 Navy team received first-team honors on the 1910 College Football All-America Team. Guard John Brown received first-team honors from The New York Sun, New York Herald, and Pittsburgh Leader. Jack Dalton received first-team honors from The New York Times. Brown and Dalton were both later inducted into the College Football Hall of Fame.

The 1910 season was Navy's third with Lt. Frank D. Berrien as head coach. Despite the undefeated season, the Navy announced on December 2 that Berrien would be assigned to duties outside the Naval Academy and would not return as the head football coach for 1911.

At the end of the 1910 season, Jack Dalton, the halfback who scored Navy's only points against Army, was selected to serve as captain of the 1911 team.

== Schedule ==
Date	Opponent	Site	Result	Source
October 1	St. John's (MD)	Worden Field; Annapolis, MD	W 16–0	
October 8	Rutgers	Worden Field; Annapolis, MD	T 0–0	
October 15	Washington & Jefferson	Worden Field; Annapolis, MD	W 15–0	
October 22	VPI	Worden Field; Annapolis, MD	W 3–0	
October 29	Western Reserve	Worden Field; Annapolis, MD	W 17–0	
November 5	Lehigh	Worden Field; Annapolis, MD	W 30–0	
November 12	Carlisle	Worden Field; Annapolis, MD	W 6–0	
November 19	NYU	Worden Field; Annapolis, MD	W 9–0	
November 26	vs. Army	Franklin Field; Philadelphia, PA (Army–Navy Game)	W 3–0	
