= 1910 Texas Longhorns football team =

American college football season

1910 Texas Longhorns football
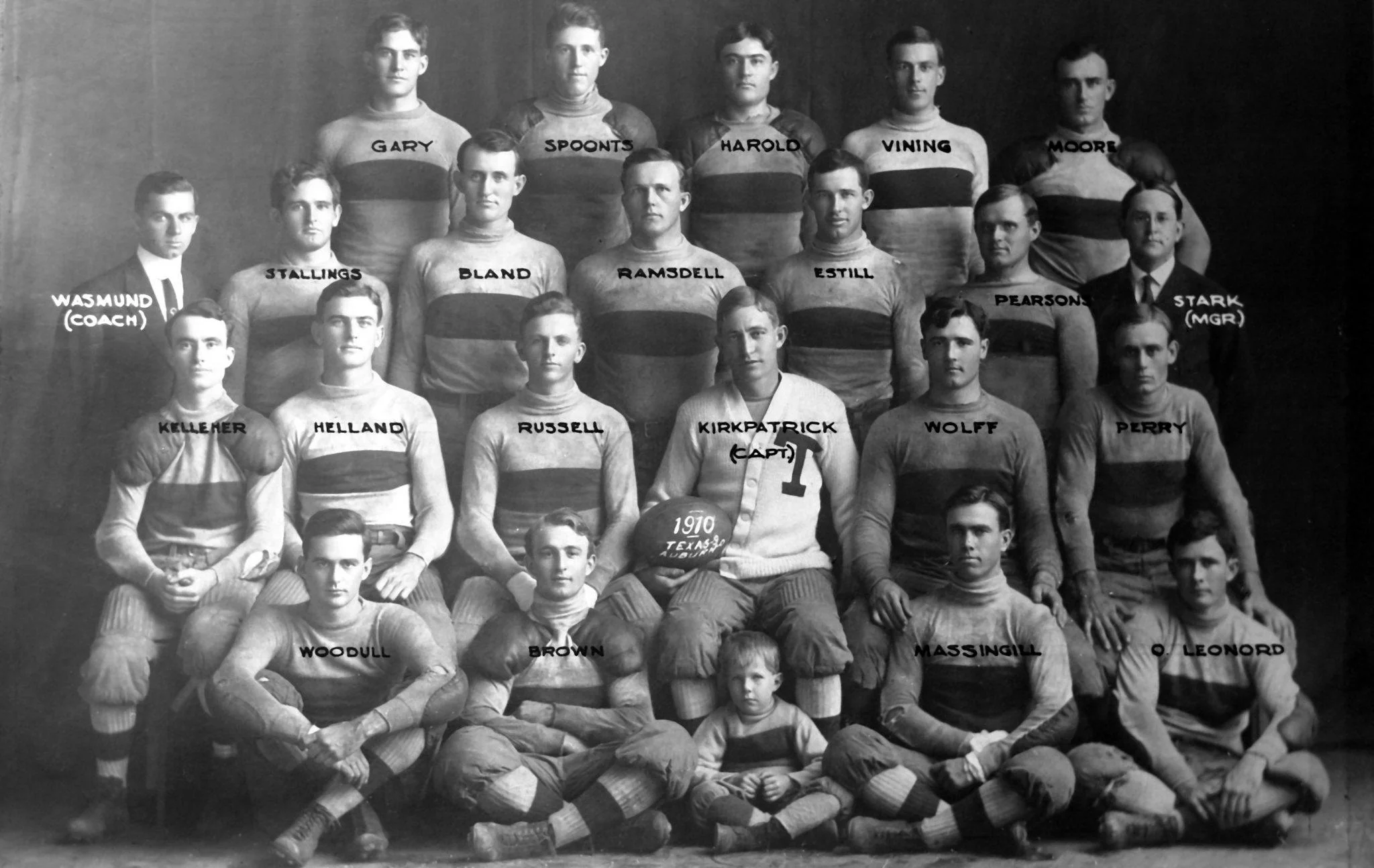
- Conference: Texas Intercollegiate Athletic Association
- Record: 6–2 (2–1 TIAA)
- Head coach: Billy Wasmund (1st season)
- Captain: Arnold L. Kirkpatrick
- Home stadium: Clark Field

1910 Southern college football independents records
	Conf.			Overall
Team	W	L	T	W		L		T
Central University		–		9	–	0	–	0
Louisiana Industrial		–		7	–	0	–	0
Stetson		–		3	–	0	–	0
Navy		–		8	–	0	–	1
North Carolina A&M		–		4	–	0	–	2
Spring Hill		–		3	–	0	–	1
Texas A&M		–		8	–	1	–	0
Arkansas		–		7	–	1	–	0
Florida		–		6	–	1	–	0
Baylor		–		6	–	1	–	1
Georgetown		–		6	–	1	–	1
Marshall		–		5	–	1	–	1
Kentucky State		–		7	–	2	–	0
Texas		–		6	–	2	–	0
Virginia		–		6	–	2	–	0
Southwestern Louisiana Industrial		–		6	–	2	–	1
Chattanooga		–		5	–	2	–	1
Kendall		–		2	–	1	–	1
Maryland		–		4	–	3	–	1
Oklahoma		–		4	–	2	–	1
Washington and Lee		–		4	–	3	–	0
South Carolina		–		4	–	4	–	0
Birmingham		–		3	–	3	–	1
VMI		–		3	–	3	–	1
Davidson		–		3	–	4	–	2
Oklahoma A&M		–		3	–	4	–	0
West Virginia		–		2	–	4	–	1
Catholic University		–		2	–	4	–	0
North Carolina		–		3	–	6	–	0
George Washington		–		2	–	2	–	2
Wake Forest		–		2	–	7	–	0
Delaware		–		1	–	2	–	2
Mississippi College		–		0	–	4	–	0
Southwest Texas State		–		0	–	4	–	0
Tulane		–		0	–	7	–	0

The 1910 Texas Longhorns football team was an American football team that represented the University of Texas (now known as the University of Texas at Austin) as an independent during the 1910 college football season. In their first year under head coach Billy Wasmund, the Longhorns compiled an overall record of 6–2 and outscored opponents by a collective total of 162 to 42.

The game against Baylor ended in a forfeit when Baylor left in the third quarter, with the score tied 6–6, due to a dispute with the referee.

== Schedule ==
Date	Opponent	Site	Result	Source
October 8	Southwestern (TX)	Clark Field; Austin, TX	W 11–6	
October 15	Haskell*	Clark Field; Austin, TX	W 68–3	
October 22	Transylvania*	Clark Field; Austin, TX	W 48–0	
October 29	Auburn*	Clark Field; Austin, TX	W 9–0	
November 5	at Baylor	Carroll Field; Waco, TX (rivalry)	W 1–0 (forfeited)	
November 14	vs. Texas A&M	West End Park; Houston, TX (rivalry)	L 8–14	
November 19	LSU*	Clark Field; Austin, TX	W 12–0	
November 24	Oklahoma*	Clark Field; Austin, TX (rivalry)	L 0–3	
*Non-conference game
