= 1910 Maryland Aggies football team =

American college football season

1910 Maryland Aggies football
- Conference: Independent
- Record: 4–3–1
- Head coach: Royal Alston (1st season)

1910 Southern college football independents records
	Conf.			Overall
Team	W	L	T	W		L		T
Central University		–		9	–	0	–	0
Louisiana Industrial		–		7	–	0	–	0
Stetson		–		3	–	0	–	0
Navy		–		8	–	0	–	1
North Carolina A&M		–		4	–	0	–	2
Spring Hill		–		3	–	0	–	1
Texas A&M		–		8	–	1	–	0
Arkansas		–		7	–	1	–	0
Florida		–		6	–	1	–	0
Baylor		–		6	–	1	–	1
Georgetown		–		6	–	1	–	1
Marshall		–		5	–	1	–	1
Kentucky State		–		7	–	2	–	0
Texas		–		6	–	2	–	0
Virginia		–		6	–	2	–	0
Southwestern Louisiana Industrial		–		6	–	2	–	1
Chattanooga		–		5	–	2	–	1
Kendall		–		2	–	1	–	1
Maryland		–		4	–	3	–	1
Oklahoma		–		4	–	2	–	1
Washington and Lee		–		4	–	3	–	0
South Carolina		–		4	–	4	–	0
Birmingham		–		3	–	3	–	1
VMI		–		3	–	3	–	1
Davidson		–		3	–	4	–	2
Oklahoma A&M		–		3	–	4	–	0
West Virginia		–		2	–	4	–	1
Catholic University		–		2	–	4	–	0
North Carolina		–		3	–	6	–	0
George Washington		–		2	–	2	–	2
Wake Forest		–		2	–	7	–	0
Delaware		–		1	–	2	–	2
Mississippi College		–		0	–	4	–	0
Southwest Texas State		–		0	–	4	–	0
Tulane		–		0	–	7	–	0

The 1910 Maryland Aggies football team was an American football team that represented Maryland Agricultural College (later part of the University of Maryland) in the 1910 college football season. The Aggies compiled a 4–3–1 record, shut out four of eight opponents, and outscored all opponents, 73 to 42. The team defeated Washington Central High School from the District of Columbia (12–0), the University of Richmond (20–0), Catholic University (21–0), and George Washington University (6–0), tied with Johns Hopkins (14–14), and lost its final three games against VMI (0–8), St. John's College (0–6), and Western Maryland (3–17). Royal Alston served as the team's head coach in his first and only season in that capacity.

== Schedule ==
Date	Opponent	Site	Result	Attendance	Source
September 27	Central High School (Washington, DC)	College Park, MD	W 10–0		
October 1	at Richmond	Richmond, VA	W 20–0	1,000	
October 8	at Johns Hopkins	Homewood Field; Baltimore, MD	T 11–11	200	
October 15	Catholic University	College Park, MD	W 21–0		
October 19	at George Washington	Washington, DC	W 6–0		
November 12	at VMI	Lexington, VA	L 0–8		
November 19	at Washington College	Annapolis, MD	L 0–6		
November 24	at Western Maryland	Westminster, MD	L 3–17		
