= 1910 Baylor football team =

American college football season

1910 Baylor football
- Conference: Independent
- Record: 6–1–1
- Head coach: Ralph Glaze (1st season)
- Captain: Thomas P. Robinson
- Home stadium: Carroll Field

1910 Southern college football independents records
	Conf.			Overall
Team	W	L	T	W		L		T
Central University		–		9	–	0	–	0
Louisiana Industrial		–		7	–	0	–	0
Stetson		–		3	–	0	–	0
Navy		–		8	–	0	–	1
North Carolina A&M		–		4	–	0	–	2
Spring Hill		–		3	–	0	–	1
Texas A&M		–		8	–	1	–	0
Arkansas		–		7	–	1	–	0
Florida		–		6	–	1	–	0
Baylor		–		6	–	1	–	1
Georgetown		–		6	–	1	–	1
Marshall		–		5	–	1	–	1
Kentucky State		–		7	–	2	–	0
Texas		–		6	–	2	–	0
Virginia		–		6	–	2	–	0
Southwestern Louisiana Industrial		–		6	–	2	–	1
Chattanooga		–		5	–	2	–	1
Kendall		–		2	–	1	–	1
Maryland		–		4	–	3	–	1
Oklahoma		–		4	–	2	–	1
Washington and Lee		–		4	–	3	–	0
South Carolina		–		4	–	4	–	0
Birmingham		–		3	–	3	–	1
VMI		–		3	–	3	–	1
Davidson		–		3	–	4	–	2
Oklahoma A&M		–		3	–	4	–	0
West Virginia		–		2	–	4	–	1
Catholic University		–		2	–	4	–	0
North Carolina		–		3	–	6	–	0
George Washington		–		2	–	2	–	2
Wake Forest		–		2	–	7	–	0
Delaware		–		1	–	2	–	2
Mississippi College		–		0	–	4	–	0
Southwest Texas State		–		0	–	4	–	0
Tulane		–		0	–	7	–	0

The 1910 Baylor football team was an American football team that represented Baylor University as an independent during the 1910 college football season. In its first season under head coach Ralph Glaze, the team compiled a 6–1–1 record and outscored opponents by a total of 217 to 17.

The sole loss was because Baylor forfeited at halftime, with the score tied 6–6 against Texas, due to a dispute with the referee.

== Schedule ==
Date	Time	Opponent	Site	Result	Source
October 1		at Daniel Baker	Athletic Field; Brownwood, TX	T 0–0	
October 8		Austin	Carroll Field; Waco, TX	W 31–0	
October 18		Haskell	Carroll Field; Waco, TX	W 52–3	
October 24	4:20 p.m.	TCU	Carroll Field; Waco, TX (rivalry)	W 52–0	
October 29		Polytechnic (TX)	Carroll Field; Waco, TX	W 39–0	
November 8		Texas	Carroll Field; Waco, TX (rivalry)	F 0–1	
November 18	4:00 p.m.	at TCU	Butz Park; Fort Worth, TX	W 10–3	
November 24		Southwestern (TX)	Carroll Field; Waco, TX	W 27–5	
All times are in Central time
