= 1910 Central University football team =

American college football season

1910 Central University football
- Conference: Independent
- Record: 9–0
- Head coach: M. B. Banks (2nd season)
- Captain: Will Seelbach

1910 Southern college football independents records
	Conf.			Overall
Team	W	L	T	W		L		T
Central University		–		9	–	0	–	0
Louisiana Industrial		–		7	–	0	–	0
Stetson		–		3	–	0	–	0
Navy		–		8	–	0	–	1
North Carolina A&M		–		4	–	0	–	2
Spring Hill		–		3	–	0	–	1
Texas A&M		–		8	–	1	–	0
Arkansas		–		7	–	1	–	0
Florida		–		6	–	1	–	0
Baylor		–		6	–	1	–	1
Georgetown		–		6	–	1	–	1
Marshall		–		5	–	1	–	1
Kentucky State		–		7	–	2	–	0
Texas		–		6	–	2	–	0
Virginia		–		6	–	2	–	0
Southwestern Louisiana Industrial		–		6	–	2	–	1
Chattanooga		–		5	–	2	–	1
Kendall		–		2	–	1	–	1
Maryland		–		4	–	3	–	1
Oklahoma		–		4	–	2	–	1
Washington and Lee		–		4	–	3	–	0
South Carolina		–		4	–	4	–	0
Birmingham		–		3	–	3	–	1
VMI		–		3	–	3	–	1
Davidson		–		3	–	4	–	2
Oklahoma A&M		–		3	–	4	–	0
West Virginia		–		2	–	4	–	1
Catholic University		–		2	–	4	–	0
North Carolina		–		3	–	6	–	0
George Washington		–		2	–	2	–	2
Wake Forest		–		2	–	7	–	0
Delaware		–		1	–	2	–	2
Mississippi College		–		0	–	4	–	0
Southwest Texas State		–		0	–	4	–	0
Tulane		–		0	–	7	–	0

The 1910 Central University football team represented Central University—now known as Centre College—as an independent during the 1910 college football season. Led by second-year head coach M. B. Banks, the team went undefeated, beating Tennessee, Tulane, and Sewanee. The team claimed an SIAA title, since Vanderbilt did not play them.

== Schedule ==
Date	Time	Opponent	Site	Result	Source
October 1		at Tennessee	Waite Field; Knoxville, TN	W 17–0	
October 8		Miami (OH)	Cheek Field; Danville, KY	W 12–2	
October 15		vs. Sewanee	Eclipse Park; Louisville, KY	W 19–0	
October 22		Hanover	Cheek Field; Danville, KY	W 33–0	
October 26		Tulane	Cheek Field; Danville, KY	W 35–0	
November 5		at Transylvania	Lexington, KY	W 27–0	
November 12	2:30 p.m.	at Cincinnati	League Park; Cincinnati, OH	W 12–3	
November 19		at Georgetown (KY)	Georgetown, KY	W 78–0	
November 24		at Kentucky State College	Lexington, KY (rivalry)	W 12–6	
