= 1910 Louisiana Industrial football team =

American college football season

1910 Louisiana Industrial football
- Conference: Independent
- Record: 7–0
- Head coach: Percy S. Prince (2nd season)

1910 Southern college football independents records
	Conf.			Overall
Team	W	L	T	W		L		T
Central University		–		9	–	0	–	0
Louisiana Industrial		–		7	–	0	–	0
Stetson		–		3	–	0	–	0
Navy		–		8	–	0	–	1
North Carolina A&M		–		4	–	0	–	2
Spring Hill		–		3	–	0	–	1
Texas A&M		–		8	–	1	–	0
Arkansas		–		7	–	1	–	0
Florida		–		6	–	1	–	0
Baylor		–		6	–	1	–	1
Georgetown		–		6	–	1	–	1
Marshall		–		5	–	1	–	1
Kentucky State		–		7	–	2	–	0
Texas		–		6	–	2	–	0
Virginia		–		6	–	2	–	0
Southwestern Louisiana Industrial		–		6	–	2	–	1
Chattanooga		–		5	–	2	–	1
Kendall		–		2	–	1	–	1
Maryland		–		4	–	3	–	1
Oklahoma		–		4	–	2	–	1
Washington and Lee		–		4	–	3	–	0
South Carolina		–		4	–	4	–	0
Birmingham		–		3	–	3	–	1
VMI		–		3	–	3	–	1
Davidson		–		3	–	4	–	2
Oklahoma A&M		–		3	–	4	–	0
West Virginia		–		2	–	4	–	1
Catholic University		–		2	–	4	–	0
North Carolina		–		3	–	6	–	0
George Washington		–		2	–	2	–	2
Wake Forest		–		2	–	7	–	0
Delaware		–		1	–	2	–	2
Mississippi College		–		0	–	4	–	0
Southwest Texas State		–		0	–	4	–	0
Tulane		–		0	–	7	–	0

The 1910 Louisiana Industrial football team was an American football team that represented the Louisiana Industrial Institute—now known as Louisiana Tech University—as an independent during the 1910 college football season. Led by second-year head coach Percy S. Prince, Louisiana Industrial compiled a record of 7–0.

== Schedule ==
Date	Opponent	Site	Result	Source
September 30	Winnfield High School	Ruston, LA	W 75–0	
October 8	at Mississippi College	Clinton, MS	W 6–0	
October 14	Ouachita Baptist	Ruston, LA	W 6–0	
October 22	Louisiana Baptist	Ruston, LA	W 60–0	
October 29	Southwestern Louisiana Industrial	Ruston, LA (rivalry)	W 75–0	
November 7	at Henderson	Arkadelphia, AR	W 11–6	
November 19	at Louisiana Normal	Natchitoches, LA (rivalry)	W 32–0	
