= 1910 Richmond Spiders football team =

American college football season

1910 Richmond Spiders football
- Conference: Eastern Virginia Intercollegiate Athletic Association
- Record: 1–6–1 (0–3 EVIAA)
- Head coach: E. V. Long (1st season)
- Captain: George W. Stadler
- Home stadium: Broad Street Park

1910 Eastern Virginia Intercollegiate Athletic Association football standings
	Conf.					Overall
Team	W		L		T	W		L		T
Randolph–Macon $	3	–	0	–	0	4	–	4	–	0
Hampden–Sydney	2	–	1	–	0	4	–	3	–	0
William & Mary	1	–	2	–	0	1	–	7	–	1
Richmond	0	–	3	–	0	1	–	6	–	1
$ – Conference champion

The 1910 Richmond Spiders football team was an American football team that represented Richmond College—now known as the University of Richmond—as a member of the Eastern Virginia Intercollegiate Athletic Association (EVIAA) during the 1910 college football season. Led by E. V. Long in his first and only year as head coach, Richmond finished the season 1–6–1.

== Schedule ==
Date	Time	Opponent	Site	Result	Attendance	Source
October 1		Maryland*	Richmond, VA	L 0–20	1,000	
October 10	4:30 p.m.	Randolph–Macon*	Broad Street Park; Richmond, VA	W 5–0		
October 15		Rock Hill College*	Richmond, VA	T 0–0		
October 29		George Washington*	Richmond, VA	L 15–21	2,000	
November 5		at Hampden–Sydney	Hampden Sydney, VA	L 0–18		
November 12		at North Carolina A&M*	Riddick Stadium; Raleigh, NC	L 0–50		
November 19	3:00 p.m.	William & Mary	Broad Street Park; Richmond, VA (rivalry)	L 6–18		
November 26		Randolph–Macon	Broad Street Park; Richmond, VA	L 11–6	3,000	
*Non-conference game
