= 1910 South Carolina Gamecocks football team =

American college football season

1910 South Carolina Gamecocks football
- Conference: Independent
- Record: 4–4
- Head coach: John Neff (1st season)
- Captain: U. G. Desportes
- Home stadium: Davis Field

1910 Southern college football independents records
	Conf.			Overall
Team	W	L	T	W		L		T
Central University		–		9	–	0	–	0
Louisiana Industrial		–		7	–	0	–	0
Stetson		–		3	–	0	–	0
Navy		–		8	–	0	–	1
North Carolina A&M		–		4	–	0	–	2
Spring Hill		–		3	–	0	–	1
Texas A&M		–		8	–	1	–	0
Arkansas		–		7	–	1	–	0
Florida		–		6	–	1	–	0
Baylor		–		6	–	1	–	1
Georgetown		–		6	–	1	–	1
Marshall		–		5	–	1	–	1
Kentucky State		–		7	–	2	–	0
Texas		–		6	–	2	–	0
Virginia		–		6	–	2	–	0
Southwestern Louisiana Industrial		–		6	–	2	–	1
Chattanooga		–		5	–	2	–	1
Kendall		–		2	–	1	–	1
Maryland		–		4	–	3	–	1
Oklahoma		–		4	–	2	–	1
Washington and Lee		–		4	–	3	–	0
South Carolina		–		4	–	4	–	0
Birmingham		–		3	–	3	–	1
VMI		–		3	–	3	–	1
Davidson		–		3	–	4	–	2
Oklahoma A&M		–		3	–	4	–	0
West Virginia		–		2	–	4	–	1
Catholic University		–		2	–	4	–	0
North Carolina		–		3	–	6	–	0
George Washington		–		2	–	2	–	2
Wake Forest		–		2	–	7	–	0
Delaware		–		1	–	2	–	2
Mississippi College		–		0	–	4	–	0
Southwest Texas State		–		0	–	4	–	0
Tulane		–		0	–	7	–	0

The 1910 South Carolina Gamecocks football team represented the University of South Carolina as an independent during the 1910 college football season. Led by first-year head coach John Neff, South Carolina compiled a record of 4–4.

== Schedule ==
Date	Opponent	Site	Result	Attendance	Source
October 8	Charleston	Davis Field; Columbia, SC	W 8–0	400	
October 15	at Medical College of Georgia	Warren Field; Augusta, GA	W 14–0		
October 22	Lenoir	Davis Field; Columbia, SC	W 33–0		
October 27	Wake Forest	Davis Field; Columbia, SC	W 6–0	500	
November 3	Clemson	Fairgrounds; Columbia, SC	L 0–24		
November 12	at Davidson	Davidson Athletic Field; Davidson, NC	L 0–53		
November 19	at North Carolina	Durham, NC	L 6–23		
November 24	at The Citadel	College Park; Charleston, SC	L 0–5	700	
