= 1910 VMI Keydets football team =

American college football season

1910 VMI Keydets football
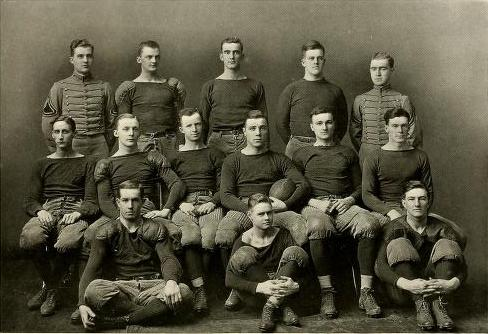
- Conference: Independent
- Record: 3–3–1
- Head coach: William Gloth (2nd season)

1910 Southern college football independents records
	Conf.			Overall
Team	W	L	T	W		L		T
Central University		–		9	–	0	–	0
Louisiana Industrial		–		7	–	0	–	0
Stetson		–		3	–	0	–	0
Navy		–		8	–	0	–	1
North Carolina A&M		–		4	–	0	–	2
Spring Hill		–		3	–	0	–	1
Texas A&M		–		8	–	1	–	0
Arkansas		–		7	–	1	–	0
Florida		–		6	–	1	–	0
Baylor		–		6	–	1	–	1
Georgetown		–		6	–	1	–	1
Marshall		–		5	–	1	–	1
Kentucky State		–		7	–	2	–	0
Texas		–		6	–	2	–	0
Virginia		–		6	–	2	–	0
Southwestern Louisiana Industrial		–		6	–	2	–	1
Chattanooga		–		5	–	2	–	1
Kendall		–		2	–	1	–	1
Maryland		–		4	–	3	–	1
Oklahoma		–		4	–	2	–	1
Washington and Lee		–		4	–	3	–	0
South Carolina		–		4	–	4	–	0
Birmingham		–		3	–	3	–	1
VMI		–		3	–	3	–	1
Davidson		–		3	–	4	–	2
Oklahoma A&M		–		3	–	4	–	0
West Virginia		–		2	–	4	–	1
Catholic University		–		2	–	4	–	0
North Carolina		–		3	–	6	–	0
George Washington		–		2	–	2	–	2
Wake Forest		–		2	–	7	–	0
Delaware		–		1	–	2	–	2
Mississippi College		–		0	–	4	–	0
Southwest Texas State		–		0	–	4	–	0
Tulane		–		0	–	7	–	0

The 1910 VMI Keydets football team represented the Virginia Military Institute (VMI) in their 20th season of organized football. The Keydets finished at 3–3–1 with second-year coach William Gloth.

== Schedule ==
Date	Opponent	Site	Result
October 1	at North Carolina	Unknown; Chapel Hill, NC	L 0–6
October 8	Norfolk Blues	VMI Parade Ground; Lexington, VA	T 0–0
October 15	William & Mary	VMI Parade Ground; Lexington, VA (rivalry)	W 33–0
October 22	at Virginia	Madison Hall Field; Charlottesville, VA	L 0–28
October 29	St. John's (MD)	VMI Parade Ground; Lexington, VA	W 22–0
November 12	Maryland	VMI Parade Ground; Lexington, VA	W 8–0
November 26	at Georgetown	Georgetown Field; Washington, DC	L 6–14

== Game summaries ==
=== North Carolina ===
VMI at North Carolina

Quarter	1	2	3	4	Total
VMI	0	0	0	0	0
North Carolina	0	0	0	6	6

at Unknown

- Date: October 1, 1910
- Game attendance: 1,000
- Referee: Bob Williams

Game information

- UNC – 4th quarter, Winston pass from Belk (Spencer Kick), 1:43

Touchdowns

- Winston (1)

Goals

- Spencer (1)

=== Norfolk Blues ===
Norfolk Blues at VMI

Quarter	1	2	3	4	Total
Norfolk Blues	0	0	0	0	0
VMI	0	0	0	0	0

at VMI Parade Ground

- Date: October 8, 1910
- Game attendance: Unknown
- Referee: Unknown

Game information

- No scoring

Touchdowns

None

Goals

None

=== William and Mary ===
William and Mary at VMI

Quarter	1	2	3	4	Total
William and Mary	0	0	0	0	0
VMI	0	5	12	16	33

at VMI Parade Ground

- Date: October 15, 1910
- Game attendance: Unknown
- Referee: Virginia White

Game information

- VMI – 2nd quarter, Moore 35-yard run (Moore kick failed)
- VMI – 3rd quarter, Karst fumble recovery (Moore kick)
- VMI – 3rd quarter, Moore reception (Moore kick)
- VMI – 4th quarter, Wilson run (Moore kick failed)
- VMI – 4th quarter, Wilson run (Moore kick failed)
- VMI – 4th quarter, Richie pass from Kinsolving (Moore kick)

Touchdowns

- Moore (2)
- Wilson (2)
- Karst (1)
- Richie (1)

Goals

- Moore (3)

=== Virginia ===
VMI at Virginia

Quarter	1	2	3	4	Total
VMI	0	0	0	0	0
Virginia	12	5	5	6	28

at Lambeth Field

- Date: October 22, 1910
- Game attendance: Unknown
- Referee: J. S. Elliot

Game information

- UVA – 1st quarter, Todd 75-yard punt return (Todd kick)
- UVA – 1st quarter, UVA 20-yard run (Honaker kick)
- UVA – 2nd quarter, UVA run (Honaker kick failed)
- UVA – 3rd quarter, Driver run (Honaker kick failed)
- UVA – 4th quarter, UVA 3-yard run (Honaker kick)

Touchdowns

- Driver (2)
- Todd (2)
- Harris (1)

Goals

- Honaker (2)
- Todd (1)

=== St. John's ===
St. John's at VMI

Quarter	1	2	3	4	Total
St. John's	0	0	0	0	0
VMI	6	5	11	0	22

at VMI Parade Ground

- Date: October 29, 1910
- Game attendance: Unknown
- Referee: Shaugnessy of Washington and Lee

Game information

- VMI – 1st quarter, Pattison 5-yard run (Moore kick)
- VMI – 2nd quarter, Dashiell 5-yard punt return (Moore kick failed)
- VMI – 3rd quarter, Pattison run (Moore kick failed)
- VMI – 3rd quarter, Pattison run (Moore kick)

Touchdowns

- Pattison (3)
- Dashiell (1)

Goals

- Moore (2)

=== Maryland ===
Maryland at VMI

Quarter	1	2	3	4	Total
Maryland	0	0	0	0	0
VMI	0	0	2	6	8

at VMI Parade Ground

- Date: November 12, 1910
- Game attendance: Unknown
- Referee: Robertson of Richmond College

Game information

- VMI – Dashiell blocked punt (Safety)
- VMI – 4th quarter, Pattison 4-yard run (Moore kick)

Touchdowns

- Pattison (1)

Goals

- Moore (1)

=== Georgetown ===
VMI at Georgetown

Quarter	1	2	3	4	Total
VMI	0	0	6	0	6
Georgetown	6	0	0	8	14

at Georgetown Field

- Date: November 26, 1910
- Game attendance: Unknown
- Referee: Gass of Lehigh

Game information

- Georgetown – 1st quarter, Costello 50-yard run (Costello kick)
- VMI – 3rd quarter, Leech run (Moore kick)
- Georgetown – 4th quarter, Walsh 25-yard field goal
- Georgetown – 4th quarter, Dunn 4-yard run (kick failed)

Touchdowns

- Costello (1)
- Dunn (1)
- Leech (1)

Goals

- Costello (1)
- Moore (1)
