= 1910 West Virginia Mountaineers football team =

American college football season

1910 West Virginia Mountaineers football
- Conference: Independent
- Record: 2–4–1
- Head coach: Charles Augustus Lueder (3rd season)
- Captain: Rudolph Munk

1910 Southern college football independents records
	Conf.			Overall
Team	W	L	T	W		L		T
Central University		–		9	–	0	–	0
Louisiana Industrial		–		7	–	0	–	0
Stetson		–		3	–	0	–	0
Navy		–		8	–	0	–	1
North Carolina A&M		–		4	–	0	–	2
Spring Hill		–		3	–	0	–	1
Texas A&M		–		8	–	1	–	0
Arkansas		–		7	–	1	–	0
Florida		–		6	–	1	–	0
Baylor		–		6	–	1	–	1
Georgetown		–		6	–	1	–	1
Marshall		–		5	–	1	–	1
Kentucky State		–		7	–	2	–	0
Texas		–		6	–	2	–	0
Virginia		–		6	–	2	–	0
Southwestern Louisiana Industrial		–		6	–	2	–	1
Chattanooga		–		5	–	2	–	1
Kendall		–		2	–	1	–	1
Maryland		–		4	–	3	–	1
Oklahoma		–		4	–	2	–	1
Washington and Lee		–		4	–	3	–	0
South Carolina		–		4	–	4	–	0
Birmingham		–		3	–	3	–	1
VMI		–		3	–	3	–	1
Davidson		–		3	–	4	–	2
Oklahoma A&M		–		3	–	4	–	0
West Virginia		–		2	–	4	–	1
Catholic University		–		2	–	4	–	0
North Carolina		–		3	–	6	–	0
George Washington		–		2	–	2	–	2
Wake Forest		–		2	–	7	–	0
Delaware		–		1	–	2	–	2
Mississippi College		–		0	–	4	–	0
Southwest Texas State		–		0	–	4	–	0
Tulane		–		0	–	7	–	0

The 1910 West Virginia Mountaineers football team was an American football team that represented West Virginia University as an independent during the 1910 college football season. In its third season under head coach Charles Augustus Lueder, the team compiled a 2–4–1 record and was outscored by a total of 95 to 20. Rudolph Munk was the team captain. Munk was fatally injured in the November 12 game against Bethany College.

== Schedule ==
Date	Opponent	Site	Result	Source
October 1	Westminster (PA)	Morgantown, WV	W 6–0	
October 8	at Penn	Franklin Field; Philadelphia, PA	L 0–38	
October 15	Bethany (WV)	Morgantown, WV	T 0–0	
October 22	Bucknell	Morgantown, WV	L 0–9	
October 29	vs. Marietta	Parkersburg, WV	L 6–10	
November 5	at Pittsburgh	Forbes Field; Pittsburgh, PA (rivalry)	L 0–38	
November 12	vs. Bethany (WV)	Wheeling, WV	W 9–0	
