= 1910 Georgetown Blue and Gray football team =

American college football season

1910 Georgetown Blue and Gray football

South Atlantic co-champion
- Conference: Independent
- Record: 6–1–1
- Head coach: Fred K. Nielsen (1st season)
- Captain: Vince Dailey
- Home stadium: Georgetown Field

1910 Southern college football independents records
	Conf.			Overall
Team	W	L	T	W		L		T
Central University		–		9	–	0	–	0
Louisiana Industrial		–		7	–	0	–	0
Stetson		–		3	–	0	–	0
Navy		–		8	–	0	–	1
North Carolina A&M		–		4	–	0	–	2
Spring Hill		–		3	–	0	–	1
Texas A&M		–		8	–	1	–	0
Arkansas		–		7	–	1	–	0
Florida		–		6	–	1	–	0
Baylor		–		6	–	1	–	1
Georgetown		–		6	–	1	–	1
Marshall		–		5	–	1	–	1
Kentucky State		–		7	–	2	–	0
Texas		–		6	–	2	–	0
Virginia		–		6	–	2	–	0
Southwestern Louisiana Industrial		–		6	–	2	–	1
Chattanooga		–		5	–	2	–	1
Kendall		–		2	–	1	–	1
Maryland		–		4	–	3	–	1
Oklahoma		–		4	–	2	–	1
Washington and Lee		–		4	–	3	–	0
South Carolina		–		4	–	4	–	0
Birmingham		–		3	–	3	–	1
VMI		–		3	–	3	–	1
Davidson		–		3	–	4	–	2
Oklahoma A&M		–		3	–	4	–	0
West Virginia		–		2	–	4	–	1
Catholic University		–		2	–	4	–	0
North Carolina		–		3	–	6	–	0
George Washington		–		2	–	2	–	2
Wake Forest		–		2	–	7	–	0
Delaware		–		1	–	2	–	2
Mississippi College		–		0	–	4	–	0
Southwest Texas State		–		0	–	4	–	0
Tulane		–		0	–	7	–	0

The 1910 Georgetown Blue and Gray football team represented Georgetown University during the 1910 college football season. Led by Fred K. Nielsen in his first year as head coach, the team went 6–1–1 and tied with North Carolina A&M for a Southern championship among the South Atlantic teams.

== Schedule ==
Date	Opponent	Site	Result	Attendance	Source
October 1	Seamen Gunners	Georgetown Field; Washington, DC	W 55–0		
October 8	at North Carolina A&M	Riddick Stadium; Raleigh, NC	T 0–0		
October 15	Washington and Lee	Georgetown Field; Washington, DC	W 52–0		
October 22	at Pittsburgh	Forbes Field; Pittsburgh, PA	L 0–17	3,000	
October 29	North Carolina	Georgetown Field; Washington, DC	W 12–0		
November 12	Virginia	Georgetown Field; Washington, DC	W 15–0	8,000	
November 19	VMI	Georgetown Field; Washington, DC	W 14–6		
November 24	Lehigh	Georgetown Field; Washington, DC	W 6–3		
