= 1918 Tulane Olive and Blue football team =

American college football season

1918 Tulane Olive and Blue football
- Conference: Southern Intercollegiate Athletic Association
- Record: 3–1–1 (0–0 SIAA)
- Head coach: Clark Shaughnessy (4th season)
- Offensive scheme: Single-wing
- Captain: Otto Colee
- Home stadium: Second Tulane Stadium

1918 Southern Intercollegiate Athletic Association football standings
	Conf.					Overall
Team	W		L		T	W		L		T
Georgia Tech $	3	–	0	–	0	6	–	1	–	0
Vanderbilt	2	–	0	–	0	4	–	2	–	0
Mississippi A&M	2	–	0	–	0	3	–	2	–	0
Clemson	3	–	1	–	0	5	–	2	–	0
South Carolina	2	–	1	–	1	2	–	1	–	1
Furman	1	–	3	–	0	3	–	5	–	1
Sewanee	0	–	1	–	0	3	–	2	–	0
The Citadel	0	–	1	–	1	0	–	2	–	1
Auburn	0	–	2	–	0	2	–	5	–	0
Ole Miss	0	–	2	–	0	1	–	3	–	0
Wofford	0	–	2	–	0	0	–	3	–	0
$ – Conference champion; There were several SIAA schools that did not field a team due to World War I.

The 1918 Tulane Olive and Blue football team was an American football team that represented Tulane University as an independent during the 1918 college football season. In its fourth year under head coach Clark Shaughnessy, Tulane compiled a 3–1–1 record and outscored opponents by a total of 159 to 105.

== Schedule ==
Date	Opponent	Site	Result	Source
November 2	Camp Shelby (MS)*	Tulane Stadium; New Orleans, LA	W 7–0	
November 9	Camp Beauregard (LA)*	Tulane Stadium; New Orleans, LA	W 13–6	
November 16	Camp Pike (AR)*	Tulane Stadium; New Orleans, LA	L 7–10	
November 23	Pensacola NAS (FL)*	Tulane Stadium; New Orleans, LA	T 0–0	
November 28	Southwestern Louisiana*	Tulane Stadium; New Orleans, LA	W 74–0	
*Non-conference game
