= 1918 Howard Bulldogs football team =

American college football season

1918 Howard Bulldogs football
- Conference: Southern Intercollegiate Athletic Association
- Record: 0–2 (0–1 SIAA)
- Head coach: Max James (1st season)
- Home stadium: Rickwood Field

1918 Southern Intercollegiate Athletic Association football standings
	Conf.					Overall
Team	W		L		T	W		L		T
Georgia Tech $	3	–	0	–	0	6	–	1	–	0
Vanderbilt	2	–	0	–	0	4	–	2	–	0
Mississippi A&M	2	–	0	–	0	3	–	2	–	0
Clemson	3	–	1	–	0	5	–	2	–	0
South Carolina	2	–	1	–	1	2	–	1	–	1
Furman	1	–	3	–	0	3	–	5	–	1
Sewanee	0	–	1	–	0	3	–	2	–	0
The Citadel	0	–	1	–	1	0	–	2	–	1
Auburn	0	–	2	–	0	2	–	5	–	0
Ole Miss	0	–	2	–	0	1	–	3	–	0
Wofford	0	–	2	–	0	0	–	3	–	0
$ – Conference champion; There were several SIAA schools that did not field a team due to World War I.

The 1918 Howard Bulldogs football team was an American football team that represented Howard College (now known as the Samford University) as a member of the Southern Intercollegiate Athletic Association (SIAA) during the 1918 college football season. In their first year under head coach Max James, the team compiled an 0–2 record.

== Schedule ==
Date	Opponent	Site	Result	Source
November 23	vs. Birmingham–Southern	Rickwood Field; Birmingham, AL	L 14–26	
November 28	at Marion	Marion, AL	L 0–101	
