= List of 100-point games in college football =

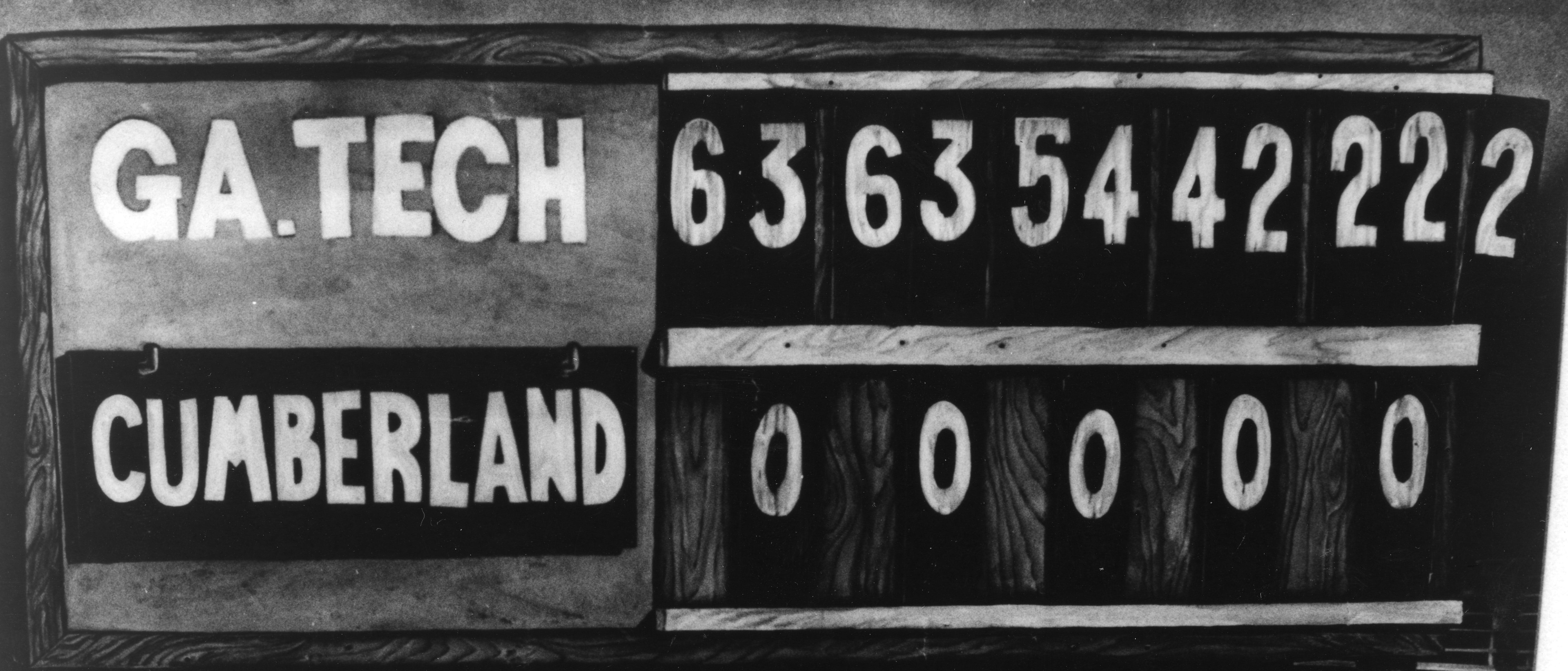
In 1916, Georgia Tech defeated Cumberland by a score of 222 to 0.

In college football, games in which 100 points are scored by a single team are rare, especially since 1940. In the post-World War II era, it is considered in poor form to run up the score of lopsided games. There have been only four occurrences since 1970, and just two since 2003.

On October 25, 1884, Yale defeated Dartmouth 113–0, becoming the first team to score 100 points in a game. The next week, Princeton defeated Lafayette 140–0.

The most points scored by a single team, and the most lopsided final score in college football history, occurred on October 7, 1916 when Georgia Tech beat Cumberland 222–0. Only two other programs have scored at least 200 points in a single game: St. Viator beat Lane (IL) 205–0 in 1916 and King (TN) defeated Lenoir 206–0 in 1922.

Twenty programs have scored at least 150 points in a game: Albion, Arizona, Bowling Green, Carrol (MT), Central Oklahoma (twice), Christian Brothers (MO), Dayton, Georgia Tech, Harvard, King (TN), Millikin, Missouri S&T, Newberry, Oklahoma (twice), Pittsburg State, Roanoke, St. Viator, Southwestern (KS), Stevens and Tulsa (twice).

It is rare for a team to have scored in a game when the opponent scored over 100 points, but several cases exist, including when SMU kicked an early field goal but Rice "came back" to win 146–3 in 1916.

Early records are often incomplete and sometimes contradictory. Scores without footnotes listed in the table below have been confirmed in at least two sources, usually The Football Thesaurus and the football media guide of one of the corresponding schools. A footnote by the score indicates a separate single reference source. The table includes not only scores from NCAA programs, but also from those that compete in the National Association of Intercollegiate Athletics, National Junior College Athletic Association, and from games played before the advent of the NCAA or NAIA.

== List of 100-point games ==
List of games showing date, season, score, opponents, stadium, city, and references
Winning team (Note: Links to the season article for the opponent when available or to their general page when unavailable.)	Losing team	Score	Date	Season (Note: Links to the overall college football season article. In the case of games involving teams from different NCAA divisions, the season article linked to is that of the higher division represented by said teams.)	Stadium	City	Reference(s)
Alabama	Marion Military Institute	110–0	September 30, 1922	1922	Denny Field	Tuscaloosa, AL	
Albion	Detroit NTS	178–0	October 19, 1919	1919	—	Albion, MI	
Alcorn A&M	Paul Quinn	101–0	September 9, 1967	1967	Baylor Stadium	Waco, TX	
Alma	Central Michigan	106–0	October 26, 1912	1912	—	Mount Pleasant, MI	
Amherst	Williston	100–0	October 3, 1891	1891	Pratt Field	Amherst, MA	
Appalachian State	Piedmont	105–0	September 26, 1936	1936	College Field	Boone, NC	
Arizona	Camp Harry J. Jones	167–0	October 16, 1920	1920	Varsity Field	Tucson, AZ	
Arizona	New Mexico Military	110–0	November 24, 1921	1921	Varsity Field	Tucson, AZ	
Arkansas	Missouri State	100–0	October 7, 1911	1911	The Hill	Fayetteville, AR	
Austin	Daniel Baker	109–0	October 15, 1920	1920	—	Sherman, TX	
Baker	Bethel (KS)	114–0	November 3, 1922	1922	Cavaness Athletic Field	Baldwin City, KS	
Baldwin–Wallace	Kent State	118–0	October 13, 1923	1923	—	Berea, OH	
Baylor	Simmons (TX)	103–0	October 27, 1917	1917	Carroll Field	Waco, TX	
Beloit	Northern Illinois	115–0	October 4, 1913	1913	—	Beloit, WI	
Bethany (KS)	Hoisington Town Team	105–0	September 27, 1902	1902	Bethany Field	Lindsborg, KS	
Bluefield	Morristown	129–0	November 17, 1928	1928	—	Bluefield, WV	
Bowling Green	Findlay	151–0	October 15, 1921	1921	—	Bowling Green, OH	
Butler	Indiana State	101–0	October 7, 1905	1905	Irwin Field	Indianapolis, IN	
Butler	Hanover	122–0	October 15, 1921	1921	Irwin Field	Indianapolis, IN	
California	Saint Mary's (CA)	127–0	October 9, 1920	1920	California Field	Berkeley, CA	
Southeast Missouri State	Will Mayfield	111–0	November 23, 1916	1916	Fairgrounds	Cape Girardeau, MO	
Southeast Missouri State	DeSoto YMCA	107–0	November 25, 1916	1916	Fairgrounds	Cape Girardeau, MO	
Carleton	Minnesota State Academy for the Deaf	118–0	September 27, 1913	1913	—	Northfield, MN	
Carleton	St. Cloud State	125–0	October 3, 1914	1914	—	Northfield, MN	
Carlisle	Albright	100–0	October 16, 1904	1904	—	Carlisle, PA	
Central State (OH)	Lane (TN)	101–0	October 28, 1989	1989	McPherson Stadium	Wilberforce, OH	
Central State (OK)	Oklahoma Methodist	183–0	October 7, 1916	1916	—	Edmond, OK	
Central Oklahoma	Oklahoma Baptist	157–0	October 14, 1919	1919	—	Edmond, OK	
Central Oklahoma	East Central	104–0	October 28, 1921	1921	—	Ada, OK	
Central Oklahoma	Carver Chiropractic	118–0	September 22, 1922	1922	—	Edmond, OK	
Centre	Bethel (KY)	110–0	October 22, 1894	1894	—	Russellville, KY	
Centre	Kentucky Wesleyan	111–0	October 27, 1916	1916	Cheek Field	Danville, KY	
Centre	Kentucky Military Institute	104–0	October 6, 1917	1917	Cheek Field	Danville, KY	
Centre	Howard (AL)	120–0	October 9, 1920	1920	Cheek Field	Danville, KY	
Centre	Georgetown (KY)	103–0	November 25, 1920	1920	Cheek Field	Danville, KY	
Chemawa Indian School	Pacific (OR)	104–0	November 13, 1920	1920	—	Salem, OR	
Chemawa Indian School	North Pacific	104–0	1923	1923	—	—	
Eastern Washington	Spokane	114–0	November 24, 1914	1914	—	Cheney, WA	
Chicago	Monmouth (IL)	108–0	September 30, 1903	1903	Marshall Field	Chicago, IL	
Chicago	Great Lakes Navy	123–0	October 11, 1919	1919	Marshall Field	Chicago, IL	
Christian Brothers (MO)	Marvin (MO)	165–0	October 9, 1915	1915	CBC Field	St. Louis, MO	
Cincinnati	Transylvania	124–0	October 5, 1912	1912	Carson Field	Cincinnati, OH	
Cincinnati	Kentucky Wesleyan	115–0	October 22, 1921	1921	Carson Field	Cincinnati, OH	
Clemson	Guilford	122–0	October 5, 1901	1901	Bowman Field	Calhoun, SC	
Coe	Highland Park	115–0	November 6, 1914	1914	Highland Park Field	Des Moines, IA	
Colgate	RPI	107–0	October 23, 1915	1915	Whitnall Field	Hamilton, NY	
Colorado	Regis	109–0	October 7, 1905	1905	Gamble Field	Boulder, CO	
Colorado Mines	Colorado	103–0	November 22, 1890	1890	—	Boulder, CO	
Colorado Mines	Longmont High School	106–0	October 10, 1903	1903	—	Golden, CO	
College of Emporia	Pittsburg State	107–0	November 12, 1910	1910	—	Emporia, KS	
College of Emporia	Olathe	105–0	September 26, 1914	1914	—	Emporia, KS	
Connecticut	Newport NTS	125–0	October 22, 1949	1949	Gardner Dow Athletic Fields	Storrs, CT	
Cornell	Rochester	106–0	October 19, 1889	1889	—	Ithaca, NY	
Cornell	Western Reserve	110–0	October 15, 1921	1921	Schoellkopf Field	Ithaca, NY	
Creighton	Omaha Commercial College	101–0	October 11, 1902	1902	Creighton Field	Omaha, NE	
Creighton	Omaha	128–0	November 15, 1913	1913	Creighton Field	Omaha, NE	
Cumberland (TN)	Bethel (KY)	103–0	November 15, 1904	1904	—	Lebanon, TN	
Davidson	Mount Pleasant (NC)	125–0	October 19, 1912	1912	Sprunt Athletic Field	Davidson, NC	
Dayton	Indiana Central Normal	161–0	September 29, 1923	1923	Varsity Field	Dayton, OH	
Defiance	Findlay	110–0	October 29, 1921	1921	—	Findlay, OH	
Detroit	Toledo	145–0	October 10, 1917	1917	University of Detroit athletic field	Detroit, MI	
Earlham	Eastern Indiana Normal	139–0	November 10, 1900	1900	—	Richmond, IN	
Edward Waters	Friendship	142–0	November 21, 1964	1964	—	Jacksonville, FL	
Wichita State	Oklahoma Christian	111–0	November 11, 1907	1907	Fairmount Field	Wichita, KS	
Florida	Southern College	144–0	October 6, 1913	1913	University Field	Gainesville, FL	
Florida Memorial	Albany State	101–0	November 16, 1946	1946	—	Albany, GA	
Fordham	Washington (MD)	101–0	October 1, 1921	1921	Fordham Field	Bronx, NY	
Fort Scott JC	Hepler Athletic Club	103–0	September 20, 1928	1928	—		
Fort Valley State	Knoxville	106–6	October 10, 1969	1969	—	Fort Valley, GA	
Franklin (IN)	Moores Hill	148–0	October 16, 1914	1914	—	Franklin, IN	
Gallaudet	Baltimore City College	103–0	October 18, 1913	1913	Kendall Green Field	Washington, DC	
Georgia	Locust Grove Institute	101–0	October 1, 1910	1910	Herty Field	Athens, GA	
Georgia	Alabama Presbyterian	108–0	October 4, 1913	1913	Sanford Field	Athens, GA	
Georgia Tech	Mercer	105–0	October 10, 1910	1910	Grant Field	Atlanta, GA	
Georgia Tech	Cumberland (TN)	222–0	October 7, 1916	1916	Grant Field	Atlanta, GA	
Georgia Tech	Furman	118–0	October 12, 1918	1918	Grant Field	Atlanta, GA	
Georgia Tech	Georgia Eleventh Cavalry	123–0	October 19, 1918	1918	Grant Field	Atlanta, GA	
Georgia Tech	NC State	128–0	November 9, 1918	1918	Grant Field	Atlanta, GA	
Harvard	Phillips Exeter	158–0	November 3, 1886	1886	—	Exeter, NH	
Harvard	Wesleyan	110–0	November 5, 1887	1887	Jarvis Field	Cambridge, MA	
Harvard	Amherst	102–0	November 3, 1888	1888	Jarvis Field	Cambridge, MA	
Harvard	Wesleyan	124–0	November 3, 1891	1891	Jarvis Field	Cambridge, MA	
Haskell	Midland	101–0	October 8, 1913	1913	Haskell Field	Lawrence, KS	
Hawaii	8th Field Artillery	101–0	October 2, 1926	1926	Moiliili Field	Honolulu, Territory of Hawaii	
Hawaii	Healani Athletic Club	101–0	October 16, 1926	1926	Moiliili Field	Honolulu, Territory of Hawaii	
Fort Hays State	Salina All-Stars	125–7	November 27, 1913	1913	—	Hays, KS	
Hendrix	Draughon Business College	112–0	October 21, 1912	1912	Hendrix Park	Conway, AR	
Hendrix	Henderson-Brown	128–0	November 7, 1919	1919	Hendrix Park	Conway, AR	
Houston	Tulsa	100–6	November 23, 1968	1968	Houston Astrodome	Houston, TX	
Howard Payne	Tarleton State	127–0	October 21, 1912	1912	—	Brownwood, TX	
Idaho State	Gooding College	106–0	November 11, 1922	1922	Hutchinson Field	Pocatello, ID	
Idaho State	Montana Western	103–0	October 31, 1930	1930	Hutchinson Field	Pocatello, ID	
Idaho State	Montana Western	111–0	November 14, 1931	1931	—	Dillon, MT	
Illinois College	Lincoln (IL)	107–0	October 9, 1914	1914	—	Jacksonville, IL	
Illinois College	Carthage	111–0	November 20, 1915	1915	—	Jacksonville, IL	
Illinois Wesleyan	Hedding	100–0	October 2, 1915	1915	Wilder Field	Bloomington, IL	
Iowa Wesleyan	William Penn	103–0	October 31, 1953	1953	—	Oskaloosa, IA	
Arkansas State	Central Arkansas	101–0	November 3, 1917	1917	Fairgrounds	Jonesboro, AR	
Emporia State	Friends	134–0	November 28, 1912	1912	—	Emporia, KS	
Tulsa	Missouri S&T	117–0	November 30, 1916	1916	Association Park	Tulsa, OK	
Tulsa	Oklahoma Baptist	152–0	September 27, 1919	1919	McNulty Park	Tulsa, OK	
Tulsa	Oklahoma Catholic	121–0	September 25, 1920	1920	McNulty Park	Tulsa, OK	
Tulsa	Oklahoma Mines	151–0	September 29, 1920	1920	McNulty Park	Tulsa, OK	
King (TN)	Washington (TN)	127–0	October 10, 1914	1914	—	Bristol, TN	
King (TN)	Lenoir	206–0	October 21, 1922	1922	Tennova Field	Bristol, TN	
King (TN)	East Tennessee State	108–0	October 30, 1923	1923	Tennova Field	Bristol, TN	
Kirksville Osteopaths	Omaha	108–0	November 25, 1916	1916	—	Kirksville, MO	
Kirksville Osteopaths	Jackson Univ. of Business (MO)	132–0	October 29, 1927	1927	—	Kirksville, MO	
Knox	St. Alban's Academy	106–0	September 26, 1914	1914	—	Galesburg, IL	
Lehigh	Penn State	106–0	November 11, 1889	1889	Lehigh Athletic Grounds	South Bethlehem, PA	
Lombard	Palmer Chropractic	102–0	September 30, 1921	1921	Lombard Stadium	Galesburg, IL	
Louisiana Normal	Monroe High School	134–0	1915	1915		Natchitoches, LA	
Louisiana Tech	Clarke Memorial	100–0	October 28, 1922	1922	Athletic Field	Ruston, LA	
Louisville	Washington (TN)	100–0	October 18, 1913	1913	Eclipse Park	Louisville, KY	
Marion Military Institute	Howard (AL)	101–0	November 28, 1918	1918	—	Marion, AL	
Marquette	Oshkosh Normal	103–0	October 20, 1917	1917	—	Milwaukee, WI	
Marshall	Kentucky Wesleyan	101–0	October 21, 1916	1916	Central Field	Huntington, WV	
MIT	Tufts	110–0	November 12, 1885	1885	Back Bay Baseball Grounds	Boston, MA	
Michigan	Buffalo	128–0	October 26, 1901	1901	Regents Field	Ann Arbor, MI	
Michigan	Michigan State	119–0	October 8, 1902	1902	Regents Field	Ann Arbor, MI	
Michigan	Iowa	107–0	November 8, 1902	1902	Regents Field	Ann Arbor, MI	
Michigan	West Virginia	130–0	October 22, 1904	1904	Regents Field	Ann Arbor, MI	
Michigan State	Hillsdale	104–0	October 29, 1904	1904	College Field	East Lansing, MI	
Michigan State	Olivet	109–0	October 30, 1920	1920	College Field	East Lansing, MI	
Michigan State	Kalamazoo	103–0	September 29, 1928	1928	College Field	East Lansing, MI	
Michigan State	Ripon	100–0	November 7, 1931	1931	College Field	East Lansing, MI	
Midland	Argentine School of Engineering	116–0	November 30, 1916	1916	Midland Field	Atchison, KS	
Midland	Dana	101–0	October 28, 1927	1927	—	Fremont, NE	
Millikin	Illinois State	107–0	October 20, 1920	1920	Millikin Field	Decatur, IL	
Millikin	Indiana State	158–6	November 25, 1920	1920	Millikin Field	Decatur, IL	
Minnesota	Grinnell	102–0	November 1, 1902	1902	Northrop Field	Minneapolis, MN	
Minnesota	Macalester	112–0	September 30, 1903	1903	Northrop Field	Minneapolis, MN	
Minnesota	Twin Cities Central High	107–0	September 17, 1904	1904	Northrop Field	Minneapolis, MN	
Minnesota	Grinnell	146–0	October 22, 1904	1904	Northrop Field	Minneapolis, MN	
Southern Mississippi	Smith County High School	113–0	October 15, 1921	1921	Kamper Park	Hattiesburg, MS	
Mississippi Valley State	Rust	101–0	September 22, 1956	1956	—	Itta Bena, MS	
Missouri S&T	Pittsburg State	104–0	November 7, 1914	1914	Jackling Field	Rolla, MO	
Missouri S&T	Kirksville Osteopaths	150–0	November 15, 1914	1914	Jackling Field	Rolla, MO	
Missouri S&T	Kansas City (KS)	109–0	November 2, 1923	1923	Jackling Field	Rolla, MO	
Montana	Carroll (MT)	133–0	October 9, 1920	1920	Dornblaser Field	Missoula, MT	
Montana	Montana Mines	106–6	October 25, 1924	1924	Clark Field	Butte, MT	
Morehead State	Rio Grande	104–0	October 18, 1941	1941	—	Morehead, KY	
Morehouse	Americus Institute	101–0	October 25, 1919	1919	—	Atlanta, GA	
Morningside	Buena Vista	116–0	October 2, 1909	1909	—	Sioux City, IA	
Morningside	Peru State	110–0	October 20, 1916	1916	Mizzou Park	Sioux City, IA	
Morningside	Dakota Wesleyan	112–0	October 28, 1916	1916	Mizzou Park	Sioux City, IA	
Carroll (MT)	Intermountain Union College	115–0	October 15, 1927	1927	—	Helena, MT	
Carroll (MT)	Montana Western	153–0	October 28, 1927	1927	—	Helena, MT	
Murray State (KY)	Will Mayfield	119–6	December 1, 1928	1928	—	Murray, KY	
Murray State (KY)	Louisville	105–0	October 8, 1932	1932	—	Murray, KY	
Navy	Ursinus	127–0	November 16, 1918	1918	Worden Field	Annapolis, MD	
Navy	Colby	121–0	November 15, 1919	1919	Worden Field	Annapolis, MD	
Nebraska	Creighton	102–0	October 28, 1905	1905	Vinton Park	Omaha, NE	
Nebraska	Haskell	119–0	November 24, 1910	1910	Nebraska Field	Lincoln, NE	
Nebraska	Kearney Normal	117–0	October 7, 1911	1911	Nebraska Field	Lincoln, NE	
Nebraska	Nebraska Wesleyan	100–0	October 6, 1917	1917	Nebraska Field	Lincoln, NE	
Chadron State	Alliance High School	100–0	November 1, 1912	1912	—	Chadron, NE	
Chadron State	Crawford American Legion	111–0	November 11, 1920	1920	—	Chadron, NE	
Peru State	Kearney Normal	104–0	October 22, 1920	1920	Oak Bowl	Peru, NE	
Nevada	Mare Island Naval Base	102–0	October 18, 1919	1919	Mackay Field	Reno, NV	
Nevada	Pacific (CA)	132–0	October 25, 1919	1919	Mackay Field	Reno, NV	
Newberry	Bailey Military Institute	150–0	October 13, 1913	1913	—	Newberry, SC	
New Mexico	Northern Arizona	108–0	November 11, 1916	1916	University Field	Albuquerque, NM	
New Mexico State	2nd Cavalry, Fort Bliss	116–0	November 2, 1912	1912	Miller Field	Las Cruces, NM	
New Mexico State	New Mexico	110–3	November 29, 1917	1917	Miller Field	Las Cruces, NM	
New Mexico State	New Mexico Mines	108–0	October 14, 1932	1932	Miller Field	Las Cruces, NM	
North Carolina A&T	Palmer (FL)	116–0	November 12, 1923	1923	—	Greensboro, NC	
NC State	Hampton Roads Navy	100–0	November 11, 1919	1919	Riddick Field	Raleigh, NC	
North Central	Lewis Institute	119–0	October 2, 1915	1915	—	Naperville, IL	
North Dakota State	Flandreau Indian School	105–0	November 17, 1903	1903	—	Flandreau, SD	
North Dakota State	Wahpeton Indian School	112–0	October 5, 1912	1912	Dacotah Field	Fargo, ND	
North Park	North Central	104–32	October 12, 1968	1968	—	Chicago, IL	
Northern Illinois	Wheaton (IL)	114–7	October 19, 1912	1912	Glidden Field	DeKalb, IL	
Northeast Center (LA)	Arkansas A&M	111–0	September 24, 1937	1937	Brown Field	Monroe, LA	
Northwestern (OK)	Stella Academy	109–0	October 28, 1911	1911	—	Alva, OK	
Notre Dame	American Medical	142–0	October 28, 1905	1905	Cartier Field	Notre Dame, IN	
Notre Dame	St. Viator	116–7	October 5, 1912	1912	Cartier Field	Notre Dame, IN	
Notre Dame	Rose-Hulman	103–0	October 10, 1914	1914	Cartier Field	Notre Dame, IN	
Occidental	Redlands	103–0	October 24, 1914	1914	—	Los Angeles, CA	
Ohio State	Oberlin	128–0	October 14, 1916	1916	Ohio Field	Columbus, OH	
Ohio Wesleyan	Miami (OH)	104–0	November 26, 1891	1891	—	Delaware, OH	
Oklahoma	Kingfisher	104–0	October 6, 1911	1911	Boyd Field	Norman, OK	
Oklahoma	Northwestern (OK)	101–0	October 10, 1913	1913	Boyd Field	Norman, OK	
Oklahoma	Northwestern (OK)	102–0	October 9, 1915	1915	Boyd Field	Norman, OK	
Oklahoma	Oklahoma Catholic	107–0	September 30, 1916	1916	Boyd Field	Norman, OK	
Oklahoma	Southwestern (OK)	140–0	October 7, 1916	1916	Boyd Field	Norman, OK	
Oklahoma	Kingfisher	179–0	September 29, 1917	1917	Boyd Field	Norman, OK	
Oklahoma	Arkansas	103–0	November 16, 1918	1918	Boyd Field	Norman, OK	
Oklahoma	Kingfisher	157–0	October 4, 1919	1919	Boyd Field	Norman, OK	
Oklahoma Mines	Kansas Military Academy	107–0	October 6, 1922	1922	—	Miami, OK	
Oklahoma State	Phillips	112–3	October 10, 1913	1913	Lewis Field	Stillwater, OK	
Oklahoma State	Phillips	134–0	October 9, 1914	1914	Lewis Field	Stillwater, OK	
Oklahoma State	Southwestern (OK)	117–0	October 21, 1916	1916	Lewis Field	Stillwater, OK	
Ole Miss	Union (TN)	114–0	October 29, 1904	1904	University Park	Oxford, MS	
Oregon	Puget Sound	114–0	October 22, 1910	1910	Kincaid Field	Eugene, OR	
Ottawa	Kansas City (KS)	114–0	November 23, 1923	1923	—	Ottawa, KS	
Ouachita Baptist	Arkansas College	109–0	October 18, 1919	1919	—	Arkadelphia, AR	
Pacific (OR)	George Fox	118–0	October 19, 1923	1923	—	Forest Grove, OR	
Penn State	Lebanon Valley	109–7	October 23, 1920	1920	New Beaver Field	State College, PA	
Phillips	Southwestern (OK)	109–0	October 5, 1918	1918	Enid High School Field	Enid, OK	
Phillips	Oklahoma City	120–0	November 3, 1922	1922	Alton Field	Enid, OK	
Phillips	Oklahoma Baptist	109–6	November 18, 1922	1922	Alton Field	Enid, OK	
Pittsburg State	Missouri State	150–0	November 28, 1912	1912	—	Pittsburg, KS	
Portland State	Delaware State	105–0	November 8, 1980	1980	Civic Stadium	Portland, OR	
Prairie View	Conroe Normal	110–0	1929	1929	—	—	
Princeton	Lafayette	140–0	October 29, 1884	1884	University Field	Princeton, NJ	
Princeton	Johns Hopkins	108–0	November 7, 1885	1885	University Field	Princeton, NJ	
Princeton	Virginia	115–0	November 1, 1890	1890	Oriole Park	Baltimore, MD	
Rice	SMU	146–3	November 17, 1916	1916	Rice Field	Houston, TX	
Roanoke	Jefferson Athletic Club	106–0	October 18, 1913	1913	—	Salem, VA	
Roanoke	Randolph-Macon Academy	187–0	September 30, 1922	1922	College Field	Salem, VA	
Rochester	Brockport State Normal	146–0	October 17, 1891	1891	—	Rochester, NY	
Rockford	Trinity Bible	105–0	September 6, 2003	2003	Sam Greeley Field	Rockford, IL	
Rose-Hulman	Evansville	121–0	October 18, 1913	1913	—	Terre Haute, IN	
Saint Louis	Blackburn	104–0	October 24, 1914	1914	Saint Louis University campus	St. Louis, MO	
St. Mary's (KS)	Midland	125–0	November 6, 1913	1913	—	St. Marys, KS	
St. Mary's (KS)	Kansas City (KS)	135–0	November 29, 1923	1923	—	St. Marys, KS	
St. Mary's (TX)	Fort Sam Houston, 23rd Infantry	100–0	October 6, 1940	1940	Alamo Stadium	San Antonio, TX	
St. Viator	Lane (IL)	205–0	October 14, 1916	1916	—	Kankakee, IL	
Xavier	Fort Thomas (KY)	120–0	November 15, 1919	1919	Norwood Ball Park	Norwood, OH	
Xavier	Lees College	132–0	October 15, 1927	1927	Corcoran Field	Cincinnati, OH	
San Jose State	University of Mexico	103–0	September 10, 1949	1949	Spartan Stadium	San Jose, CA	
Sewanee	Florence State Normal	101–0	October 12, 1912	1912	Hardee Field	Sewanee, TN	
Sewanee	Cumberland (TN)	107–0	September 30, 1916	1916	Hardee Field	Sewanee, TN	
Sewanee	Bryson	102–0	October 8, 1921	1921	Hardee Field	Sewanee, TN	
Snow College	Community Christian College	101–6	November 1, 2025	2025	Terry Foote Stadium	Ephraim, UT	
Southern	Bishop (TX)	105–0	November 8, 1952	1952	—	Baton Rouge, LA	
Southern Illinois	International University Arts & Sciences (MO)	118–0	November 6, 1914	1914	Bayless Field	Carbondale, IL	
Southeastern (OK)	Murray State (OK)	101–0	October 4, 1913	1913	—	Durant, OK	
Southeastern (OK)	Oklahoma City	102–0	October 13, 1922	1922	—	Durant, OK	
Southwestern (KS)	Friends	151–0	November 22, 1912	1912	—	Winfield, KS	
Southwestern Louisiana	Delcambre Academy	105–0	November 7, 1903	1903	—	Lafayette, LA	
Southwestern Louisiana	Patterson	107–6	December 1918	1918	—	—	
Stephen F. Austin	Center High School	120–0	September 29, 1923	1923	—	Nacogdoches, TX	
Stephen F. Austin	Marshall	113–0	October 9, 1926	1926	—	Nacogdoches, TX	
Stevens	CCNY	162–0	November 3, 1885	1885	—	Hoboken, NJ	
Stevens Point Normal	St. Norbert	108–0	October 14, 1921	1921	Fairgrounds	Stevens Point, WI	
Susquehanna	Lykens YMCA	104–0	October 11, 1902	1902	—	Selinsgrove, PA	
Syracuse	Manhattan	144–0	November 5, 1904	1904	University Oval	Syracuse, NY	
Temple	Blue Ridge (MD)	110–0	October 1, 1927	1927	Temple Field	Philadelphia, PA	
Tennessee	American Temperance	104–0	October 7, 1905	1905	Baldwin Park	Knoxville, TN	
Tennessee	King (TN)	101–0	October 5, 1912	1912	Waite Field	Knoxville, TN	
Tennessee	Carson–Newman	101–0	September 25, 1915	1915	Waite Field	Knoxville, TN	
Tennessee	Cumberland (TN)	101–0	October 23, 1915	1915	Waite Field	Knoxville, TN	
Texarkana JC	El Dorado JC	103–0	September 19, 1930	1930	—		
Texas College	Mary Allen	102–0	November 2, 1934	1934	—	Tyler, TX	
Texas College	Jarvis	106–12	October 17, 1942	1942	Steer Stadium	Tyler, TX	
Texas A&M	Daniel Baker	110–0	October 1, 1920	1920	Kyle Field	College Station, TX	
Texas Tech	Wayland	120–0	October 5, 1925	1925	South Plains Fairgrounds	Lubbock, TX	
Trinity (IA)	Dana	103–0	October 15, 1927	1927	Stock Yard Park	Sioux City, IA	
Tusculum	Carson–Newman	103–0	October 25, 1919	1919	—	Jefferson City, TN	
Tuskegee	Americus Institute	109–0	1917	1917	—	—	
Utah	Fort Douglas	107–5	November 6, 1904	1904	Cummings Field	Salt Lake City, UT	
Utah	Fort Douglas	129–0	October 28, 1905	1905	Cummings Field	Salt Lake City, UT	
Utah	College of Idaho	105–3	November 3, 1923	1923	Cummings Field	Salt Lake City, UT	
Utah State	Crimsons	100–0	November 25, 1907	1907	U.A.C. gridiron	Logan, UT	
Utah State	Idaho State	136–0	October 11, 1919	1919	Adams Field	Logan, UT	
Valparaiso	Lewis Institute	110–0	November 2, 1923	1923	Brown Field	Valparaiso, IN	
Vanderbilt	Bethel (KY)	105–0	September 28, 1912	1912	Dudley Field	Nashville, TN	
Vanderbilt	Maryville (TN)	100–3	October 5, 1912	1912	Dudley Field	Nashville, TN	
Vanderbilt	Henderson-Brown	100–0	October 16, 1915	1915	Dudley Field	Nashville, TN	
Virginia	Randolph–Macon	142–0	November 24, 1890	1890	Madison Hall Field	Charlottesville, VA	
Virginia	Fort Monroe	102–0	November 14, 1894	1894	Madison Hall Field	Charlottesville, VA	
VMI	Hampden–Sydney	136–0	October 2, 1920	1920	VMI Parade Ground	Lexington, VA	
Wabash	Evansville	101–0	October 4, 1912	1912	—	Crawfordsville, IN	
Central Missouri	Kemper Military	127–0	October 5, 1912	1912	—	Warrensburg, MO	
Washington	Whitworth	100–0	October 18, 1913	1913	Denny Field	Seattle, WA	
Washington	Whitman	120–0	October 25, 1919	1919	Denny Field	Seattle, WA	
Washington	Willamette	108–0	September 26, 1925	1925	Husky Stadium	Seattle, WA	
Washington & Jefferson	Grove City	100–0	November 1, 1913	1913	—	Washington, PA	
Washington & Jefferson	Dickinson	105–0	October 3, 1914	1914	—	Washington, PA	
Washington and Lee	Charleston (WV)	103–0	October 3, 1914	1914	Wilson Field	Lexington, VA	
Washington and Lee	Roanoke	118–3	November 10, 1917	1917	Wilson Field	Lexington, VA	
West Liberty State	Cedarville	137–0	November 19, 1932	1932	—	West Liberty, WV	
Memphis	Somerville High School	115–0	October 14, 1916	1916	—	Memphis, TN	
West Texas State	Panhandle A&M	104–13	October 6, 1922	1922	Buffalo Park	Canyon, TX	
West Virginia Wesleyan	George Washington	101–7	November 6, 1920	1920	—	Buckhannon, WV	
Western Michigan	Hillsdale	102–0	October 14, 1916	1916	Western State Teachers College Field	Kalamazoo, MI	
Whittier	UCLA	103–0	November 20, 1920	1920	Hadley Field	Whittier, CA	
Wiley	Shreveport Central High School	114–0	October 31, 1921	1921	State Fair Grounds	Shreveport, LA	
Wiley	Philander Smith	105–0	September 28, 1946	1946	—	Little Rock, AR	
William Jewell	Maryville (MO)	102–0	November 3, 1916	1916	—	Liberty, MO	
Wisconsin	Whitewater Normal	106–0	November 1, 1890	1890	Randall Field	Madison, WI	
Wyoming	Northern Colorado	103–0	November 5, 1949	1949	Jackson Field	Greeley, CO	
Yale	Dartmouth	113–0	October 25, 1884	1884	—	Hanover, NH	
Yale	Wesleyan	136–0	October 30, 1886	1886	Yale Field	New Haven, CT	
Yale	Wesleyan	106–0	October 15, 1887	1887	Andrus Field	Middletown, CT	
Yale	Wesleyan	105–0	November 17, 1888	1888	Yale Field	New Haven, CT	

== Breakdown of list ==
As a supplement to the list, the following summarizations are provided.

=== Team appearances on list ===
Oklahoma has scored at least 100 points in the most games with eight, followed by Centre and Georgia Tech with five. Georgia Tech holds the single season record for most games scoring at least 100 points, with three in 1918.

Wesleyan has allowed at least 100 points in the most games with five, followed by Bethel (KY), Cumberland (TN), Kansas City (KS), Kingfisher, Montana Western, Oklahoma Baptist, and Southwestern Oklahoma State with three each. Kansas City (KS) allowed the most 100 point games in a single season, with three in 1923.

Excluding games in the 19th century and early 1900s, the Houston Cougars are the only current FBS team to score 100 points against another FBS team, against Tulsa in 1968.

A total of 32 teams have both won and lost 100 point games: Amherst, Arkansas, Carroll (MT), Colorado, Creighton, Cumberland (TN), Haskell, Idaho State, King (TN), Kirksville Osteopaths, Louisville, Marion Military Institute, Michigan State, Midland, Missouri S&T, NC State, New Mexico, North Central, Northern Illinois, Northwestern (OK), Oklahoma Mines, Pacific (OR), Penn State, Peru State, Phillips, Pittsburg State, Roanoke, Rochester, Rose-Hulman, St. Viator, Tulsa, and Virginia.

Virginia is the only team to win and lose a 100-point game in the same season. In 1890, Virginia lost to Princeton 115-0 and defeated Randolph-Macon 142–0.

=== Least margin of victory ===
The losing team has scored more than seven points in only three games. North Central scored 32 points in 1968 and North Park won by "only" 72 points. Jarvis scored 12 in 1942 to lose to Texas College by 94 points. Oklahoma Panhandle State scored 13 in 1922 to lose to West Texas A&M by 91 points.

=== Games by decade ===
The 1920 season produced the most 100 point games in a single year with 19, but the 1910s proved to be the decade with the most 100 point games with 129. From 1910 to 1929, a total of 203 games were played with 100 points scored by one side, meaning 70% of all such games were in this 20-year period.

Decade	# games	Percent of total
1860s	0	0.0
1870s	0	0.0
1880s	13	4.5
1890s	10	3.5
1900s	32	11.1
1910s	129	44.8
1920s	74	25.7
1930s	10	3.5
1940s	8	2.8
1950s	3	1.0
1960s	5	1.7
1970s	0	0.0
1980s	2	0.7
1990s	0	0.0
2000s	1	0.3
2010s	0	0.0
2020s	1	0.3
