= 1912 College Football All-Southern Team =

American all-star college football team

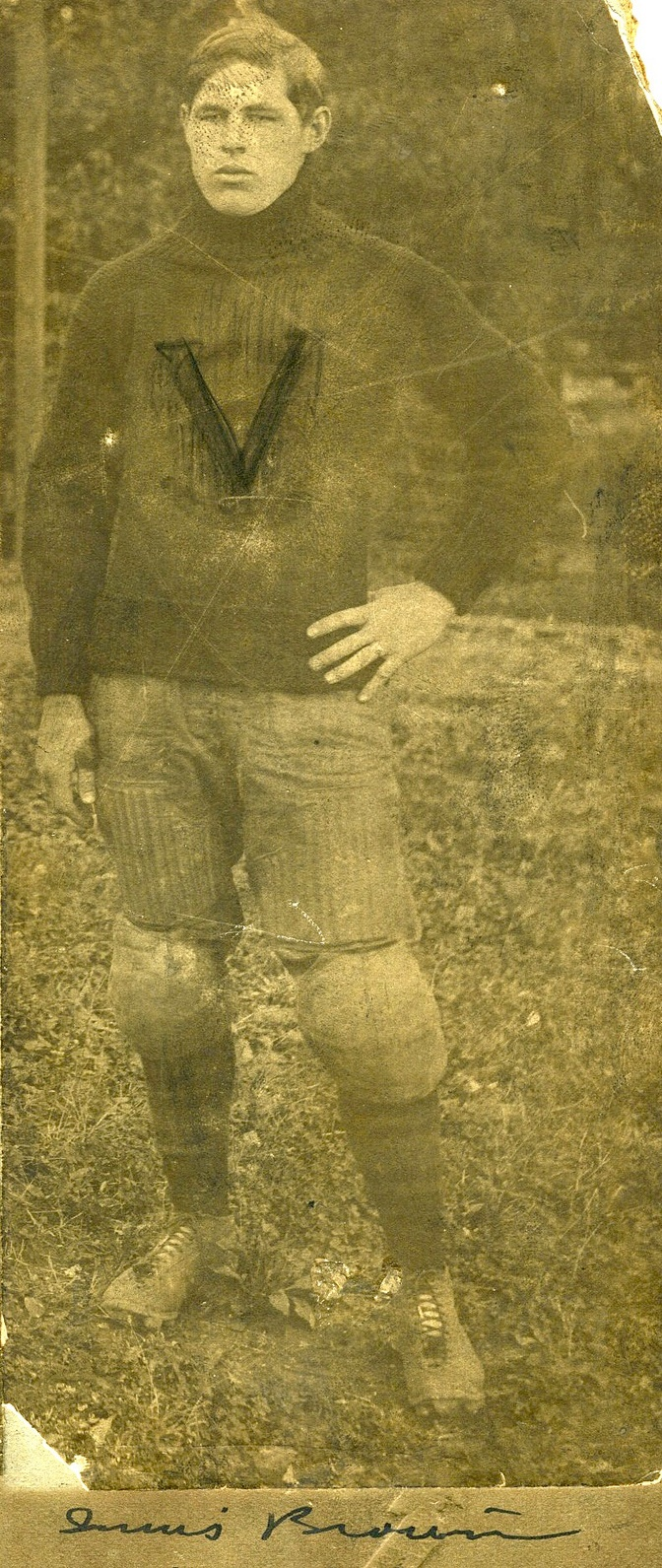
Innis Brown as a player.

The 1912 College Football All-Southern Team consists of American football players selected to the College Football All-Southern Teams selected by various organizations for the 1912 Southern Intercollegiate Athletic Association football season. Lew Hardage was selected for Walter Camp's third-team All-American. Vanderbilt won the SIAA championship. Georgetown won the SAIAA championship.

Innis Brown, a referee throughout the south, and captain of Vanderbilt's 1905 championship team, was hired to select the team of the Atlanta Constitution. The Constitution's editor Dick Jemison also selected a team. Former Georgia player and captain and then assistant Harold Ketron selected a team. Georgia Tech head coach John Heisman as usual picked one also. Former Mississippi head coach Nathan Stauffer selected an All-Southern team for Collier's Weekly.

== Composite eleven ==
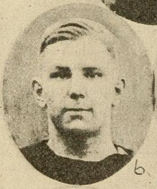
Lew Hardage.

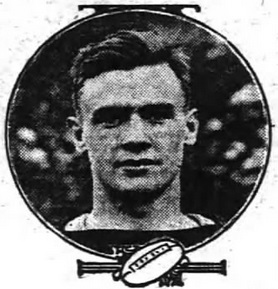
Ammie Sikes.

The composite All-Southern eleven formed by "consolidated pick" of ten sporting writers culled by the Atlanta Constitution editor Dick Jemison included:

- Rube Barker, tackle for Mississippi. Later, he was a practicing physician in Oakland, Illinois.
- Enoch Brown, end for Vanderbilt. Known as "Nuck," he was a Rhodes Scholar.
- Tom Brown, tackle for Vanderbilt. He played with the Toledo Maroons and was later a physician. "He had no peers in his orthopedic ability and contributed greatly to Toledo medicine."
- Jenks Gillem, end for Sewanee. He was a renowned punter and kicker, selected as the punter for the Associated Press Southeast Area All-Time football team 1869-1919 era. He later coached.
- Lew Hardage, halfback and senior-captain for Vanderbilt, unanimous selection, was also selected third-team All-American by Walter Camp, the fourth ever Southern player to get such a recognition. Innis Brown in 1912 wrote "Hardage has been rated as probably the most successful man in the south at making forward passes."
- B. J. Lamb, tackle for Auburn. Known as "Sheep," he practiced tackling on trees.
- Bob McWhorter, halfback for Georgia, unanimous selection. He was the school's first All-American, inducted into the College Football Hall of Fame in 1954. Sportswriter Dick Jemison said "When you mention football to an Athens fan its definition is Bob McWhorter, and vice-versa." He was selected for the Associated Press Southeast Area All-Time football team 1869-1919 era. McWhorter went on to have a lengthy law career.
- Hugh Morgan, center for Vanderbilt, unanimous selection. Chosen "by a good margin" wrote Brown. Later, he was a world-renowned internist and medical professor.
- David Peacock, guard for Georgia. Known as "Emp," was an assistant coach for his alma mater in 1914. He was once president pro-tempore of the Georgia state Senate.
- Ammie Sikes, fullback for Vanderbilt. Brown chose him for his speed.
- Lee Tolley, quarterback for Sewanee. Later, he was a Southeastern Conference official.

== Composite overview ==
Lew Hardage, Bob McWhorter, and Hugh Morgan were unanimous All-Southern selections.

Name	Position	School	First-team selections
Lew Hardage	Halfback	Vanderbilt	10
Bob McWhorter	Halfback	Georgia	10
Hugh Morgan	Center	Vanderbilt	10
Enoch Brown	End	Vanderbilt	8
Tom Brown	Tackle	Vanderbilt	8
Ammie Sikes	Fullback	Vanderbilt	8
B. J. Lamb	Tackle	Auburn	8
Jenks Gillem	End	Sewanee	7
Hargrove Van de Graaff	End	Alabama	6
Rube Barker	Tackle	Ole Miss	6
David Peacock	Guard	Georgia	6
Lee Tolley	Quarterback	Sewanee	4
Big Thigpen	Guard	Auburn	2
Jim Stoney	Guard	Sewanee	2
F. C. Burns	Guard	Auburn	2
John Henderson	Guard	Georgia	2
Guts Meadows	Guard	Auburn	2
Kirk Newell	Halfback	Auburn	2
Paul A. Reule	Fullback	Mississippi A & M	2
R. N. MacCallum	Guard	Sewanee	1
Herman Daves	Guard	Vanderbilt	1
Rip Major	Quarterback	Auburn	1
Alf McDonald	Quarterback	Georgia Tech	1
Ralph Fletcher	Quarterback	Ole Miss	1

== All-Southerns of 1912 ==
=== Ends ===
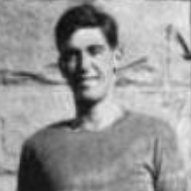
Jenks Gillem.

- Enoch Brown, Vanderbilt (C, IB, NS-2, H, HK, NT)
- Jenks Gillem, Sewanee (C, IB, NS-1, SS, H, BAH, NT)
- Hargrove Van de Graaff, Alabama (C, SS, HK, BAH)
- Robbie Robinson, Auburn (NS-1)
- Homer Montgomery, Texas A&M (NS-2)
- Slick Stewart, Vanderbilt (AT)
- By Walton, SPU (AT)

=== Tackles ===
- Tom Brown, Vanderbilt (C, IB, NS-1, H, BAH, NT)
- B. J. Lamb, Auburn (C, NS-2, SS, H, HK, BAH, NT, AT)
- Sam Bowler, Texas A & M (NS-2)
- Ewing Y. Freeland, Vanderbilt (AT)

=== Guards ===
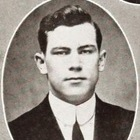
Rube Barker.

- Rube Barker, Mississippi (C, IB [as t], NS-1 [as t], SS [as t], H, BAH, NT)
- David Peacock, Georgia (C, IB, NS-2, HK)
- Big Thigpen, Auburn (C, H)
- Guts Meadows, Auburn (C, H [as t])
- Jim Stoney, Sewanee (C, IB)
- F. C. Burns, Auburn (C, NS-1, HK)
- John Henderson, Georgia (C, HK [as t])
- R. N. MacCallum, Sewanee (C, BAH)
- Herman Daves, Vanderbilt (C, NT)
- H. G. Lambert, Texas A&M (NS-1)
- Tom Dutton, LSU (SS)
- Aubrey Carter, Virginia (NS-2)
- Will Metzger, Vanderbilt (AT)
- Joel Covington, Vanderbilt (AT)

=== Centers ===
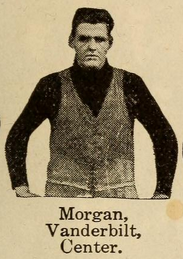
Hugh Morgan.

- Hugh Morgan, Vanderbilt (C, IB, NS-2, SS [as g], H, HK, BAH, NT)
- John C. Adams, Mississippi (NS-1, AT)
- Brooks Garrett, Tulane (SS)

=== Quarterbacks ===
- Lee Tolley, Sewanee (C, IB, NT)
- Kirk Newell, Auburn (C, NS-2 [as hb], BAH)
- Rip Major, Auburn (C)
- Alf McDonald, Georgia Tech (C, HK)
- Ralph Fletcher, Mississippi (C, AT)
- Harry Costello, Georgetown (NS-1)
- Farley Moody, Alabama (SS)
- R. A. Kern, Texas A & M (NS-2)

=== Halfbacks ===
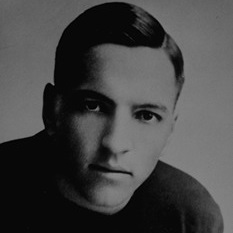
Bob McWhorter.

- Lew Hardage†, Vanderbilt (C, IB, NS-1, SS, H, HK, BAH, NT, AT)
- Bob McWhorter, Georgia (College Football Hall of Fame) (C, IB, NS-2, SS, H, HK, BAH)
- Adrian Van de Graaff, Alabama (NS-1)
- Pete Shields, Mississippi (AT)

=== Fullbacks ===
- Ammie Sikes, Vanderbilt (C, IB, H [as qb], HK, NT [as hb])
- Paul A. Reule, Mississippi A & M (C, NS-1, H, BAH)
- Grady Higginbotham, Texas A & M (SS)
- Wilson Collins, Vanderbilt (NT)
- Ed Vesmirovsky, Texas A & M (NS-2)
- William C. Cahall, Mississippi (AT)

== Key ==
Bold = Composite selection

† = Unanimous selection

C = received votes for a composite All-Southern eleven from one of ten sports writers compiled by Dick Jemison of the Atlanta Constitution, called the "consolidated pick." The ten came from Innis Brown, John Heisman, Jemison, Julian Murphey, Harold Ketron, The Birmingham Age-Herald, Atticus Mullin, The Montgomery Advertiser, the Memphis Commercial-Appeal and the Nashville Democrat. Votes for multiple positions are combined. Most chose Rube Barker as a guard in this composite.

IB = selected by Innis Brown, captain of 1905 Vanderbilt football team and referee throughout the South.

NS = selected by Nathan P. Stauffer of Collier's Weekly. It had a first and second team, denoted by the numbers 1 or 2.

SS = selected by Sam Sarokin, sporting editor for the New Orleans Item.

H = selected by John Heisman, coach at the Georgia Institute of Technology, as published in Fuzzy Woodruff's A History of Southern Football 1890-1928.

HK = selected by Harold Ketron.

BAH = selected by the Birmingham Age-Herald.

NT = posted in the Nashville Tennessean.

AT = an All-Southern team which played against an All-Texas squad.

== See also ==
- 1912 College Football All-America Team
