= Ralph Fletcher (American football) =

American football quarterback

Profile
- Position: Quarterback

Career information
- College: Mississippi (1912)

Awards and highlights
- All-Southern (1912)

Ralph E. Fletcher was an American college football player. He was a quarterback for the University of Mississippi, selected All-Southern in 1912. Five days before the 1912 contest with rival Mississippi A&M, he was declared ineligible by the Southern Intercollegiate Athletic Association, because he had appeared in a Chicago freshman game. He starred in the game against Vanderbilt.
