= Herman Daves =

American football player (1890–1946)

Profile
- Position: Guard/Tackle

Personal information
- Born: August 5, 1890; Fayetteville, Tennessee, U.S.
- Died: July 4, 1946 (aged 55); Lynnville, Tennessee, U.S.
- Listed weight: 178 lb (81 kg)

Career information
- College: Vanderbilt (1912; 1917–1918)

Awards and highlights
- SIAA championship (1912); All-Southern (1912)

James Herman Daves (August 5, 1890 – July 4, 1946) was a college football player.

== College football ==
Daves was a guard and tackle for Dan McGugin's Vanderbilt Commodores of Vanderbilt University. He played on the 1912 and 1918 Vanderbilt teams, captain of the 1918 team. His play was praised during Vanderbilt's largest ever victory, a 105 to 0 over Bethel in 1912. Daves was selected All-Southern that year. He may have been All-Southern in 1918 as well. At Vanderbilt he was a member of Sigma Nu fraternity. His brother Oliver Daves was an All-Southern end for the Washington and Lee Generals in 1919.
