= F. C. Burns =

- Born: August 31, 1890; Florence, Alabama
- Died: July 22, 1915 (aged 24); New Decatur, Alabama
- Football career

Auburn Tigers
- Position: Guard

Career information
- College: Auburn (1912)

Awards and highlights
- All-Southern (1912)

Fleming Cayce Burns (August 31, 1890 – July 22, 1915) was a superintendent of the Oneonta Oil & Fertilizer Company. He was a college football player for the Auburn Tigers and was selected All-Southern in 1912.

He died from tetanus in New Decatur, Alabama, on July 22, 1915, after an oil mill construction accident which injured two fingers on his left hand.
