= Paul A. Reule =

American football player

Profile
- Position: Fullback

Career information
- College: Mississippi A&M (1912)

Career history
- Toledo Maroons

Awards and highlights
- All-Southern (1912)

Paul A. "Dutch" Reule was an American football player. He played college football for the Mississippi A & M Aggies of Mississippi A & M University, selected an All-Southern fullback in 1912. He played for the Toledo Maroons.

== See also ==
- 1912 College Football All-Southern Team
