= Rube Barker =

American football player and track athlete (1889–1958)

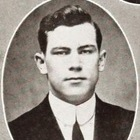
- Barker in Ole Miss yearbook.

Profile
- Position: Tackle

Personal information
- Born: July 23, 1889; East St. Louis, Illinois, U.S.
- Died: August 6, 1958 (aged 69)
- Listed weight: 175 lb (79 kg)

Career information
- College: Ole Miss (1911–1913); Virginia (1914; 1916–1917)

Awards and highlights
- SAIAA championship (1914); All-Southern (1911, 1912, 1914)

Reuben Allen Barker (July 23, 1889 – August 6, 1958) was an American football player and track athlete for the Ole Miss Rebels of the University of Mississippi and Virginia Cavaliers of the University of Virginia. He was then a practicing physician.

== Ole Miss ==
=== Football ===
He was selected an All-Southern tackle in 1911 and 1912, "Rube" was the captain of the 1913 team.

== University of Virginia ==
=== Football ===
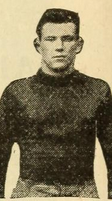
"Rube"

He was selected All-Southern again by Dick Jemison in 1914. He graduated with an M. D. from the University of Virginia in 1917. Barker was often split between his medical studies and football. Barker was therefore often in and out of the lineup. One account of the excitement upon one of his reentries reads "With Allan Thurman and "Rube" Barker, two of the best linemen who ever wore the Orange and Blue colors, back in the line-up, Virginia's chances of emerging victorious over the University of Georgia today are exceedingly bright.

== Medical practice ==
Barker was a practicing physician in Oakland, Illinois.
