= Marion E. Meadows =

American football player

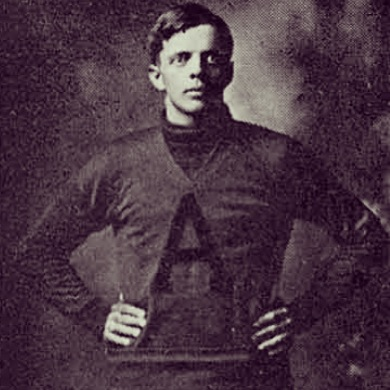
- Marion E. "Guts" Meadows in his Auburn football jersey.

Auburn Tigers
- Positions: Tackle, guard

Personal information
- Born: March 8, 1890
- Died: September 18, 1965; Phenix City, Alabama

Career information
- College: Auburn (1911–1912)

Awards and highlights
- All-Southern (1912)

Marion Ellison "Guts" Meadows (March 8, 1890 – September 18, 1965) was a college football player for coach Mike Donahue's Auburn Tigers football team. He played in the line opposite tackle Sheep Lamb and was selected All-Southern in 1912. He was later a physician in Columbus, Georgia and Phenix City, Alabama.
