= Lee Tolley =

American football player and official (1892–1972)

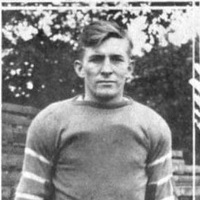

Profile
- Position: Quarterback
- Class: 1914

Personal information
- Born: September 28, 1892; Fayetteville, Tennessee, U.S.
- Died: November 1, 1972 (aged 80); Chattanooga, Tennessee, U.S.
- Listed height: 5 ft 7 in (1.70 m)
- Listed weight: 148 lb (67 kg)

Career information
- College: Sewanee (1911–1914)

Awards and highlights
- All-Southern (1912, 1914); Sewanee Athletics Hall of Fame

Robert Lee Tolley (September 28, 1892 – November 1, 1972) was a college football player and Southeastern Conference official.

== Sewanee ==
Tolley was a quarterback for the Sewanee Tigers of the University of the South from 1911 to 1914.

=== 1912 ===
Tolley was selected to All-Southern teams in 1912.

=== 1914 ===
In 1914, a year in which he was captain, he led the Sewanee eleven to the first defeat of rival Vanderbilt since 1909. Tolley was awarded a gold football charm to commemorate the 14 to 13 victory. One account reads "For brilliance and beauty of execution, (Tolley's play) has had few equals, if any, in the South, and the Tiger leader retires from the game as the premier quarterback in the S.I.A.A., beyond a doubt." His performance included a 75-yard punt return for a touchdown.

== First World War ==
Tolley served in the First World War.
