= Clement J. McNaspy =

American sports coach, college athletics administrator and physics profressor

- McNaspy, from 1922 Southwestern Louisiana Institute Photographs collection

Biographical details
- Born: April 20, 1882; Kansas, U.S.
- Died: December 15, 1933 (aged 51); Lafayette, Louisiana, U.S.

Coaching career (HC unless noted)

Football
- 1908–1911: Southwestern Louisiana
- 1913: Southwestern Louisiana
- 1917–1918: Southwestern Louisiana

Basketball
- 1911–1915: Southwestern Louisiana

Baseball
- 1909–1910: Southwestern Louisiana

Head coaching record
- Overall: 34–15–4 (football); 23–19 (basketball); 6–0 (baseball)

Accomplishments and honors

Championships
- Football; 1 LIAA (1917)

Clement James McNaspy (April 20, 1882 – December 15, 1933) was an American football, baseball, and basketball coach, college athletics administrator, and physics profressor. He served as the head football, baseball, and basketball coach and athletic director at Southwestern Louisiana Institute, now known as University of Louisiana at Lafayette.

== Early years ==
McNaspy was born in Kansas in 1882. At the time of the 1900 United States census, he was living in Union Township, Dickinson County, Kansas, with his mother Anna McNaspy and four younger siblings, and working as a farm laborer. McNaspy studied at the University of Kansas before earning a bachelor's degree at Tulane University. He later added a master's degree from Louisiana State University (LSU).

== Coaching career ==
McNaspy spent his adult life as a teacher, athletic coach, and athletic administrator at Southwestern Louisiana Institute, now known as University of Louisiana at Lafayette. He was the school's first athletic director and coached the school's basketball, football and baseball teams. He was the basketball coach at Southwest Louisiana for five years, from 1911 to 1915, and compiled a record of 23–19. In seven years as the school's football record, he compiled a record of 34–15–4 (.667). McNaspy Stadium, built in 1940 at the university, was named for McNaspy.

== Family ==
McNaspy was married in 1909 to Agnes Aimee Thibodaux. At the time of the 1910 United States census, he was living with Agnes in Lafayette. In a draft registration card dated September 12, 1918, McNaspy indicated that he was a teacher at Southwest Louisiana Industrial Institute. At the time of the 1920 United States census, he was living in Lafayette with Agnes and their two children, C. J. and Agnes, and his occupation was listed as a teacher at the State Institute. At the time of the 1930 United States census, he was living in Lafayette with Agnes and their two children, C. J. and Agnes, and his occupation was listed as a teacher at the State College.

McNaspy's son, C. J. McNaspy, was a Jesuit priest, musicologist, educator, author, and dean at Loyola University New Orleans.

== Death and honors ==
McNaspy died on December 15, 1933, at his home in Lafayette, Louisiana, after suffering a heart attack.

In 1940, Southwestern Louisiana Institute constructed McNaspy Stadium, a 4,500-seat stadium located on campus and named in honor of McNaspy. The stadium was later demolished in 2000.

== Head coaching record ==
=== Football ===
Year	Team	Overall	Conference	Standing	Bowl/playoffs
Southwestern Louisiana Industrial (Independent) (1908–1911)
1908	Southwestern Louisiana Industrial	6–0			
1909	Southwestern Louisiana Industrial	5–2–2			
1910	Southwestern Louisiana Industrial	6–2–1			
1911	Southwestern Louisiana Industrial	1–4–1			
Southwestern Louisiana Industrial (Independent) (1913)
1913	Southwestern Louisiana Industrial	4–4			
Southwestern Louisiana Industrial (Louisiana Intercollegiate Athletic Association) (1917–1918)
1917	Southwestern Louisiana Industrial	8–2		1st	
1918	Southwestern Louisiana Industrial	4–1			
Southwestern Louisiana Industrial:		34–15–4			
Total:		34–15–4			
National championship Conference title Conference division title or championship game berth
