= C. J. McNaspy =

American Jesuit priest (1915–1995)

Clement James McNaspy S.J.
- Born: March 22, 1915; Lafayette, Louisiana, U.S.
- Died: February 3, 1995 (aged 79); New Orleans, Louisiana, U.S.
- Other name: CJ
- Occupations: Retired Academic Dean and Professor Emeritus
- Known for: Priest, musicologist, author, editor, professor, dean, missionary

Clement James "CJ" McNaspy S.J. (March 22, 1915 – February 3, 1995) was a Jesuit priest, musicologist, educator, author, and retired Academic Dean (Emeritus) of the College of Music of Loyola University New Orleans in New Orleans, Louisiana.

== Early life ==
McNaspy was born on March 22, 1915 in Lafayette, Louisiana, the son of Clement J. McNaspy and Agnes Aimee Thibodaux McNaspy. He joined the Society of Jesus on July 20, 1931 and was ordained to the Priesthood on June 21, 1944.

== Education ==
McNaspy began studies at Saint Louis University in St. Louis, MO in 1931, earning his STB there. He later earned a PhD in Musicology at Université de Montréal and did postdoctoral work at Oxford.

== Career ==
McNaspy worked for many years in academia, spending several years at Loyola University, New Orleans. Besides his lectures on Music (taught through the Department of Philosophy), "CJ," as he was lovingly called by his students, regularly invited celebrities from the musical world to his classes for live interviews and demonstrations. His guests included Marian McPartland in 1976, who played a live mini-concert for the students after her interview. Another guest group was a string bass octet formed of members of the New Orleans Philharmonic and their friends. As a practicing harpsichordist Fr. McNaspy offered frequent concerts to colleagues, attendees, and university community members at the Jesuit Art Institute during summer 1971. The venue then was Santa Clara University, Santa Clara, California (then, a year later, at a similar Institute in Frascati, Italy.) McNaspy often shared photographs from his many travels and incorporated them into his lectures. "There's our hero," he would say, referring to himself atop a camel. He wrote a column for the local archdiocese (the "Clarion Herald"), entitled "Hemidemisemiquavers" or "Short Notes." A great fan of J.S. Bach, McNaspy had a series of radio programs in which he featured Bach Cantatas and gave notes on their history and place in the church calendar. He accompanied the Loyola University Chorale to Europe on several occasions. One student noted that on a walk with CJ in Rome, casually pointed out the place where Julius Caesar had been assassinated. It was said that McNaspy was so brilliant, he could philosophize in seven languages. His influence on young people was tremendous, encouraging them to continue learning, regardless of degrees held. McNaspy wrote several books, including the book Lost Cities of Paraguay upon which the story of the movie The Mission is based. He wrote the book following a number of years as a missionary to the Guarani Indians, the tribe featured in the movie. McNaspy served for a time as an editor of America.
