= 2003 Trinity Bible vs. Rockford football game =

| Trinity Bible Lions | Rockford Regents |
| (0–0) | (0–0) |
| UMAC | UMAC |
| 0 | 105 |
| Head coach: Rusty Bentley | Head coach: Mike Hoskins |
| | 1 | 2 | 3 | 4 | Total |
|---|---|---|---|---|---|
| Trinity Bible | 0 | 0 | 0 | 0 | 0 |
| Rockford | 28 | 35 | 35 | 7 | 105 |
- Date: September 6, 2003
- Season: 2003
- Stadium: Sam Greeley Field
- Location: Rockford, Illinois
- Referee: Greg Blum
- Attendance: 918

The 2003 Trinity Bible vs. Rockford football game was a college football game played on September 6, 2003, at Sam Greeley Field in Rockford, Illinois, during the 2003 NCAA Division III football season. Rockford defeated Trinity Bible 105–0. The result set the NCAA Division III single-game scoring record at the time.

== Game summary ==
Rockford led 28–0 after the first quarter and 63–0 at halftime before completing the 105–0 victory. The official box score credits Rockford with 548 yards of total offense and 18 first downs, while Trinity Bible recorded 14 yards and five first downs. Trinity Bible held possession for 37 minutes and 48 seconds.

Rockford's 105 points surpassed the previous Division III single-game scoring record of 97, set by Concordia–Moorhead in 1977.

In reporting after the game, Rockford coach Mike Hoskins said that the team had played all of its available players and had not thrown the football in the second half.

=== Scoring summary ===
Scoring summary

| Quarter | Time | Drive | | | Team | Scoring information | Score | |
| Quarter | Time | Plays | Yards | TOP | Team | Scoring information | TB | RK |
|---|---|---|---|---|---|---|---|---|
| 1 | 10:43 | 5 | 63 | 2:30 | RK | M Naymola 44-yard touchdown reception from Tr Stocker, D Sellers kick no good | 0 | 6 |
| 1 | 7:51 | 5 | 54 | 1:14 | RK | M Naymola 40-yard touchdown reception from Tr Stocker, G Anderson kick good | 0 | 13 |
| 1 | 6:44 | | | | RK | A Werner tackled in end zone for a safety by S Crawford | 0 | 15 |
| 1 | 6:34 | 1 | 47 | 00:10 | RK | Kickoff returned 47 yards for touchdown by B Lemons, 2-point pass incomplete | 0 | 21 |
| 1 | 00:53 | 7 | 34 | 3:23 | RK | Marcus Howard 6-yard touchdown run, D Sellers kick good | 0 | 28 |
| 2 | 13:12 | 3 | 36 | 1:24 | RK | Marcus Howard 33-yard touchdown run, G Anderson kick good | 0 | 35 |
| 2 | 11:48 | 3 | 26 | 1:20 | RK | Marcus Howard 6-yard touchdown run, D Sellers kick good | 0 | 42 |
| 2 | 7:26 | | 31 | | RK | Interception returned 31 yards for touchdown by F Martin, G Anderson kick good | 0 | 49 |
| 2 | 5:52 | 1 | 48 | 0:21 | RK | I Holloway 56-yard touchdown run, D Sellers kick good | 0 | 56 |
| 2 | 5:23 | 1 | 4 | 0:06 | RK | I Holloway 4-yard touchdown run, G Anderson kick good | 0 | 63 |
| 3 | 14:38 | 1 | 43 | 0:22 | RK | Marcus Howard 43-yard touchdown run, D Sellers kick good | 0 | 70 |
| 3 | 14:20 | | 27 | | RK | Interception returned 27 yards for touchdown by B Lemons, G Anderson kick good | 0 | 77 |
| 3 | 13:25 | | 15 | | RK | Interception returned 15 yards for touchdown by N Newson, D Sellers kick good | 0 | 84 |
| 3 | 11:05 | 3 | 25 | 1:07 | RK | I Holloway 4-yard touchdown run, G Anderson kick good | 0 | 91 |
| 3 | 6:22 | 2 | 75 | 1:11 | RK | Marcus Howard 67-yard touchdown run, D Sellers kick good | 0 | 98 |
| 4 | 6:59 | 3 | 35 | 2:00 | RK | I Holloway 14-yard touchdown run, G Anderson kick good | 0 | 105 |
| "TOP" = time of possession. For other American football terms, see Glossary of American football. | | | | | | | 0 | 105 |
