= 1918 Southern Intercollegiate Athletic Association football season =

- League: NCAA
- Sport: College football
- Duration: September 28, 1918 through December 7, 1918
- Teams: 11

Regular Season
- Season champions: Georgia Tech

Football seasons
- ← 1917 1919 →

1918 Southern Intercollegiate Athletic Association football standings
	Conf.					Overall
Team	W		L		T	W		L		T
Georgia Tech $	3	–	0	–	0	6	–	1	–	0
Vanderbilt	2	–	0	–	0	4	–	2	–	0
Mississippi A&M	2	–	0	–	0	3	–	2	–	0
Clemson	3	–	1	–	0	5	–	2	–	0
South Carolina	2	–	1	–	1	2	–	1	–	1
Furman	1	–	3	–	0	3	–	5	–	1
Sewanee	0	–	1	–	0	3	–	2	–	0
The Citadel	0	–	1	–	1	0	–	2	–	1
Auburn	0	–	2	–	0	2	–	5	–	0
Ole Miss	0	–	2	–	0	1	–	3	–	0
Wofford	0	–	2	–	0	0	–	3	–	0
$ – Conference champion; There were several SIAA schools that did not field a team due to World War I.

The 1918 Southern Intercollegiate Athletic Association football season was the college football games played by the member schools of the Southern Intercollegiate Athletic Association as part of the 1918 college football season. The season began on September 28.

Georgia Tech was conference champion. Center Bum Day was the first Southern player ever selected to Walter Camp's All-America first-team.

== Regular season ==
Index to colors and formatting
Non-conference matchup; SIAA member won
Non-conference matchup; SIAA member lost
Non-conference matchup; tie
Conference matchup

SIAA teams in bold.

=== Week One ===
Date	Visiting team	Home team	Site	Result	Attendance	Reference
September 28	Camp Sevier	**Clemson**	Riggs Field • Calhoun, SC	**W** 61–0		

=== Week Two ===
Date	Visiting team	Home team	Site	Result	Attendance	Reference
October 5	**Clemson**	**Georgia Tech**	Grant Field • Atlanta, GA	**GT** 28–0		
October 5	Morgan Training School	**Sewanee**	Hardee Field • Sewanee, TN	**W** 68–6		

=== Week Three ===
Date	Visiting team	Home team	Site	Result	Attendance	Reference
October 12	**Furman**	**Georgia Tech**	Grant Field • Atlanta, GA	**GT** 118–0		
October 12	Camp Greenleaf	**Sewanee**	Hardee Field • Sewanee, TN	**L** 0–14		

=== Week Four ===
Date	Visiting team	Home team	Site	Result	Attendance	Reference
October 19	Oglethorpe	**Auburn**	Drake Field • Auburn, AL	**W** 58–0		
October 19	Camp Greenleaf	**Vanderbilt**	Dudley Field • Nashville, TN	**L** 0–6		
October 19	Georgia Eleventh Cavalry	**Georgia Tech**	Grant Field • Atlanta, GA	**W** 123–0		

=== Week Five ===
Date	Visiting team	Home team	Site	Result	Attendance	Reference
October 26	Camp Greenleaf	**Auburn**	Drake Field • Auburn, AL	**L** 0–26		
October 26	Camp Hancock	**Vanderbilt**	Dudley Field • Nashville, TN	**L** 6–25		
October 26	Camp Gordon	**Georgia Tech**	Grant Field • Atlanta, GA	**W** 28–0	12,000	
October 26	48th Infantry	**Furman**	Furman campus • Greenville, SC	**W** 26–0		

=== Week Six ===
Date	Visiting team	Home team	Site	Result	Attendance	Reference
November 2	**Sewanee**	Tennessee (SATC)	Waite Field • Knoxville, TN	**W** 68–0		
November 2	**Clemson**	**South Carolina**	University Field • Columbia, SC	**CLEM** 39–0		
November 2	48th Infantry	**Furman**	Furman campus • Greenville, SC	**W** 20–7	3,000	
November 2	Kentucky	**Vanderbilt**	Dudley Field • Nashville, TN	**W** 33–0		
November 2	Payne Field	**Mississippi A&M**	New Athletic Field • Starkville, MS	**L** 6–7		
November 3	**Auburn**	Marion	Marion, AL	**W** 20–7		

=== Week Seven ===
Date	Visiting team	Home team	Site	Result	Attendance	Reference
November 9	**Auburn**	Camp Gordon	Memorial Stadium • Columbua, GA	**L** 14–6		
November 9	Erskine	**Furman**	Furman campus • Greenville, SC	**T** 6–6		
November 9	Camp Hancock	**Clemson**	Riggs Field • Calhoun, SC	**L** 13–66		
November 9	Camp Shelby	**Mississippi A&M**	New Athletic Field • Starkville, MS	**W** 12–0		
November 9	Payne Field	**Ole Miss**	West Point, MS	**L** 0–6		
November 9	Tennessee (SATC)	**Vanderbilt**	Dudley Field • Nashville, TN	**W** 76–0		
November 10	NC State	**Georgia Tech**	Grant Field • Atlanta, GA	**W** 128–0		

=== Week Eight ===
Date	Visiting team	Home team	Site	Result	Attendance	Reference
November 16	**Clemson**	The Citadel	Davis Field • Columbia, SC	**CLEM** 7–0		
November 16	Erskine	Wofford	Spartanburg, SC	**L** 0–27		
November 16	Union (TN)	Ole Miss	Hemingway Stadium • Oxford, MS	**W** 39–0		
November 16	Park Field	Mississippi A&M	Russwood Park • Memphis, TN	**L** 0–6		
November 16	**Vanderbilt**	Auburn	Rickwood Field • Birmingham, AL	**VAN** 21–0		
November 16	**South Carolina**	Furman	Furman campus • Greenville, SC	**SCAR** 20–12		

=== Week Nine ===
Date	Visiting team	Home team	Site	Result	Attendance	Reference
November 22	Charleston Navy	**The Citadel**	College Park Stadium • Charleston, SC	**L** 0–6		
November 22	Fort Oglethorpe	**Sewanee**	Chamberlain Field • Chattanooga, TN	**W** 24–6		
November 23	**Furman**	**Clemson**	Riggs Field • Calhoun, SC	**CLEM** 68–7		
November 23	**Georgia Tech**	Pittsburgh	Forbes Field • Pittsburgh, PA	**L** 0–32	30,000	
November 23	**Wofford**	**South Carolina**	University Field • Columbia, SC	**SCAR** 13–0		

=== Week Ten ===
Date	Visiting team	Home team	Site	Result	Attendance	Reference
November 28	Davidson	Clemson	Riggs Field • Calhoun, SC	**W** 7–0		
November 28	**Auburn**	Georgia Tech	Grant Field • Atlanta, GA	**GT** 41–0		
November 28	**Ole Miss**	Mississippi A&M	New Athletic Field • Starkville, MS	**MSA&M** 34–0		
November 28	**The Citadel**	South Carolina	County Fairgrounds • Orangeburg, SC	**T** 0–0		
November 28	**Sewanee**	Vanderbilt	Dudley Field • Nashville, TN	**VAN** 40–0		
November 30	2nd Development Regiment	Furman	Furman campus • Greenville, SC	**L** 7–13		

=== Week Eleven ===
Date	Visiting team	Home team	Site	Result	Attendance	Reference
December 4	**Furman**	**Wofford**	Spartanburg, SC	**FUR** 7–0		
December 7	**Mississippi A&M**	**Ole Miss**	Hemingway Stadium • Oxford, MS	**MSA&M** 13–0		
December 7	Presbyterian	**Furman**	Furman campus • Greenville, SC	**L** 7–13		
December 7	Camp Sheridan	**Auburn**	Soldiers Field • Montgomery, AL	**L** 0–7		

== Awards and honors ==
=== All-Americans ===
- E – Bill Fincher, Georgia Tech (MS; TM-1, WC-2)
- T – Joe Guyon, Georgia Tech (MS)
- C – Bum Day, Georgia Tech (WC-1)
- HB – Buck Flowers, Georgia Tech (WC-2 [fb]; TM-2)
