= B. J. Lamb =

American football player (1887–1928)

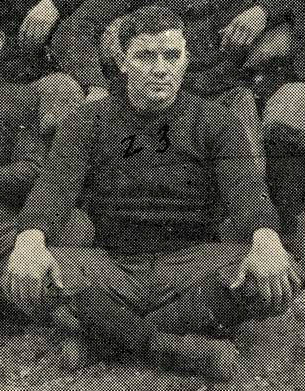
- Lamb cropped from 1908 team picture.

Profile
- Position: Tackle

Personal information
- Born: November 5, 1887; Eutaw, Alabama, U.S.
- Died: September 12, 1928 (aged 40)
- Listed weight: 181 lb (82 kg)

Career information
- College: Auburn (1908; 1910–1912)

Awards and highlights
- All-Southern (1911, 1912)

Benjamin Joseph "Sheep" Lamb (November 5, 1887 – September 12, 1928) was a college football player.

== Auburn University ==
Lamb was a prominent tackle for Mike Donahue's Auburn Tigers of Auburn University in 1908 and from 1910 to 1912. He was twice All-Southern.

=== 1911 ===
In the 1911 game with Georgia, after disease had swept through the team, Reynolds Tichenor begged his team to win for Donahue, implying he was very sick indeed. Lamb led the attack, even with a broken hand from the week before, once late saying "We've fit this far. We ain't but a second or two to go. Now let's go fight'em some more." Lamb knocked three different centers unconscious en route to preserving a scoreless tie. Lamb practiced tackling on trees.
