= 1918 Ole Miss Rebels football team =

American college football season

1918 Ole Miss Rebels football
- Conference: Southern Intercollegiate Athletic Association
- Record: 1–3 (0–2 SIAA)
- Head coach: Dudy Noble (2nd season)
- Home stadium: Hemingway Stadium

1918 Southern Intercollegiate Athletic Association football standings
	Conf.					Overall
Team	W		L		T	W		L		T
Georgia Tech $	3	–	0	–	0	6	–	1	–	0
Vanderbilt	2	–	0	–	0	4	–	2	–	0
Mississippi A&M	2	–	0	–	0	3	–	2	–	0
Clemson	3	–	1	–	0	5	–	2	–	0
South Carolina	2	–	1	–	1	2	–	1	–	1
Furman	1	–	3	–	0	3	–	5	–	1
Sewanee	0	–	1	–	0	3	–	2	–	0
The Citadel	0	–	1	–	1	0	–	2	–	1
Auburn	0	–	2	–	0	2	–	5	–	0
Ole Miss	0	–	2	–	0	1	–	3	–	0
Wofford	0	–	2	–	0	0	–	3	–	0
$ – Conference champion; There were several SIAA schools that did not field a team due to World War I.

The 1918 Ole Miss Rebels football team represented the University of Mississippi (Ole Miss) as a member of the Southern Intercollegiate Athletic Association (SIAA) during the 1918 college football season. Led by second-year head coach Dudy Noble, the Rebels compiled an overall record of 1–3, with a mark of 0–2 in conference play. Ole Miss played home games at Hemingway Stadium in Oxford, Mississippi. Unlike all other seasons there were two Egg Bowl losses.

== Schedule ==
Date	Opponent	Site	Result	Source
November 9	at Payne Field*	West Point, MS	L 0–6	
November 16	Union (TN)*	Hemingway Stadium; Oxford, MS	W 39–0	
November 28	at Mississippi A&M	New Athletic Field; Starkville, MS (rivalry)	L 0–34	
December 7	Mississippi A&M	Hemingway Stadium; Oxford, MS (rivalry)	L 0–13	
*Non-conference game
