= 1918 Southwestern Louisiana Industrial football team =

American college football season

1918 Southwestern Louisiana Industrial football
- Conference: Louisiana Intercollegiate Athletic Association
- Record: 4–1 (2–0 LIAA)
- Head coach: Clement J. McNaspy (7th season)
- Home stadium: Campus Athletic Field

The 1918 Southwestern Louisiana Industrial football team was an American football team that represented the Southwestern Louisiana Industrial Institute (now known as the University of Louisiana at Lafayette) as a member of the Louisiana Intercollegiate Athletic Association (LIAA) during the 1918 college football season. In their seventh year under head coach Clement J. McNaspy, the team compiled a 4–1 record.

== Schedule ==
Date	Opponent	Site	Result	Source
November 23	Louisiana College	Lafayette, LA	W 20–12	
November 28	at Tulane*	Tulane Stadium; New Orleans, LA	L 0–74	
December 7	at Louisiana College	Pineville, LA	W 13–6	
December	Patterson*		W 107–6	
December 21	Camp Beauregard*	Lafayette, LA	W 26–0	
*Non-conference game
