= Trinity Bible College and Graduate School =

Coordinates: 46°00′03″N 98°31′06″W

Trinity Bible College and Graduate School (TBCGS) is a private bible college and graduate school in Ellendale, North Dakota. It is affiliated with the Assemblies of God USA.

== History ==
The school was first founded in Devils Lake in 1948 (78 years ago) as Trinity Bible Institute, but after several moves, settled in Ellendale in 1972 where it assumed ownership of the former campus of the North Dakota State Normal and Industrial School for $1 and an agreement to upgrade the campus and facilities. The name would later be changed to Trinity Bible College.

The property was purchased for $1 and was considered a miracle at that time, and promoted for years after in capital campaigns which claimed they were "building on a miracle".

The school primarily offers instruction in Biblical studies, with programs in business, intercultural studies, ministry, teacher education, and music.

In 2014, Trinity introduced its first graduate degree program, a Master of Arts in Missional Leadership. Its graduate school has since expanded to offer two other MAs: Rural Ministries and Global Theology. In March 2019, Trinity was approved to offer a research PhD in Practical Theology.

Trinity Bible College and Graduate School is accredited by Association for Biblical Higher Education.

Trinity Bible College has produced several notable pastors and evangelists worldwide.

== Athletics ==
Trinity Bible College teams participate as a member of the National Christian College Athletic Association (NCCAA). Men's sports include basketball and cross country; while women's sports include basketball, cross country and volleyball. The Trinity Bible College Lions football team was previously an associate member of Upper Midwest Athletic Conference and competed at the NCAA Division III level from 1997 to 2007. In 2003, they had a record loss to Rockford by a score 105–0. The football program was discontinued in 2019.
