= 1918 Mississippi A&M Aggies football team =

American college football season

1918 Mississippi A&M Aggies football
- Conference: Southern Intercollegiate Athletic Association
- Record: 3–2 (2–0 SIAA)
- Head coach: Stanley L. Robinson (2nd season)
- Home stadium: New Athletic Field

1918 Southern Intercollegiate Athletic Association football standings
	Conf.					Overall
Team	W		L		T	W		L		T
Georgia Tech $	3	–	0	–	0	6	–	1	–	0
Vanderbilt	2	–	0	–	0	4	–	2	–	0
Mississippi A&M	2	–	0	–	0	3	–	2	–	0
Clemson	3	–	1	–	0	5	–	2	–	0
South Carolina	2	–	1	–	1	2	–	1	–	1
Furman	1	–	3	–	0	3	–	5	–	1
Sewanee	0	–	1	–	0	3	–	2	–	0
The Citadel	0	–	1	–	1	0	–	2	–	1
Auburn	0	–	2	–	0	2	–	5	–	0
Ole Miss	0	–	2	–	0	1	–	3	–	0
Wofford	0	–	2	–	0	0	–	3	–	0
$ – Conference champion; There were several SIAA schools that did not field a team due to World War I.

The 1918 Mississippi A&M Aggies football team represented The Agricultural and Mechanical College of the State of Mississippi (now known as Mississippi State University) as a member of the Southern Intercollegiate Athletic Association (SIAA) during the 1918 college football season. Led by second-year head coach Stanley L. Robinson, the Aggies compiled an overall record of 3–2, with a mark of 2–0 in conference play. Mississippi A&M played home games at the New Athletic Field in Starkville, Mississippi. The season is the only with two Egg Bowl victories.

== Schedule ==
Date	Opponent	Site	Result	Source
November 2	Payne Field*	New Athletic Field; Starkville, MS	L 6–7	
November 9	Camp Shelby*	New Athletic Field; Starkville, MS	W 12–0	
November 16	vs. Park Field*	Russwood Park; Memphis, TN	L 0–6	
November 28	Ole Miss	New Athletic Field; Starkville, MS (rivalry)	W 34–0	
December 7	at Ole Miss	Hemingway Stadium; Oxford, MS	W 13–0	
*Non-conference game
