= 1918 Georgia Tech Golden Tornado football team =

American college football season

1918 Georgia Tech Golden Tornado football
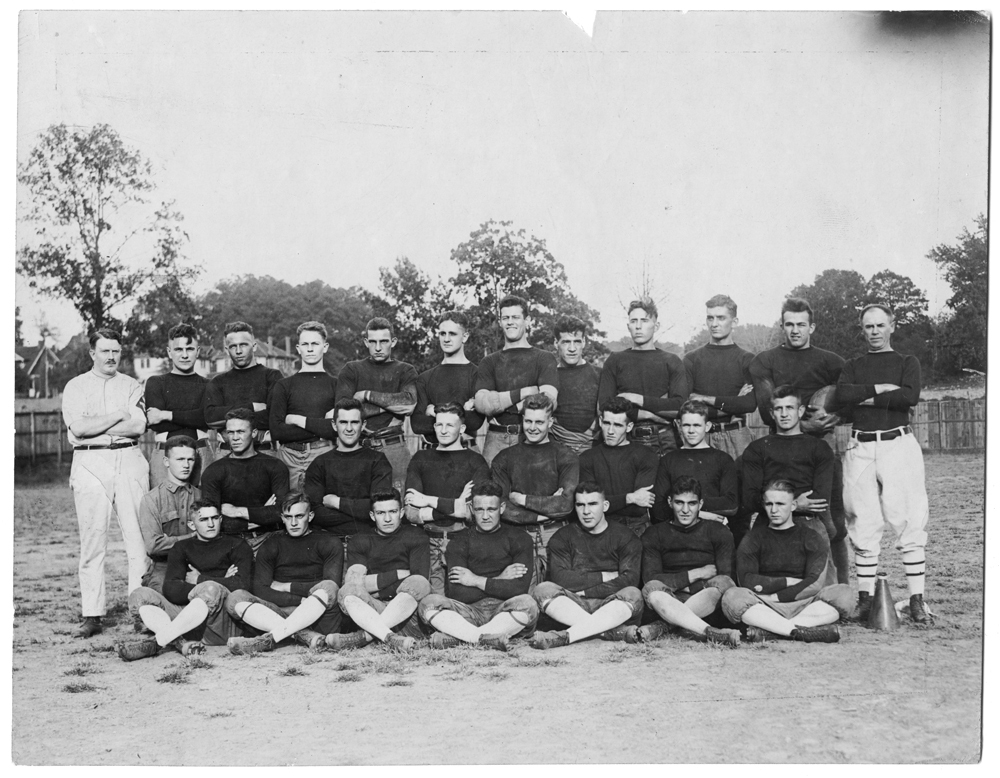

SIAA champion
- Conference: Southern Intercollegiate Athletic Association
- Record: 6–1 (3–0 SIAA)
- Head coach: John Heisman (15th season)
- Offensive scheme: Jump shift
- Captain: Bill Fincher
- Home stadium: Grant Field

1918 Southern Intercollegiate Athletic Association football standings
	Conf.					Overall
Team	W		L		T	W		L		T
Georgia Tech $	3	–	0	–	0	6	–	1	–	0
Vanderbilt	2	–	0	–	0	4	–	2	–	0
Mississippi A&M	2	–	0	–	0	3	–	2	–	0
Clemson	3	–	1	–	0	5	–	2	–	0
South Carolina	2	–	1	–	1	2	–	1	–	1
Furman	1	–	3	–	0	3	–	5	–	1
Sewanee	0	–	1	–	0	3	–	2	–	0
The Citadel	0	–	1	–	1	0	–	2	–	1
Auburn	0	–	2	–	0	2	–	5	–	0
Ole Miss	0	–	2	–	0	1	–	3	–	0
Wofford	0	–	2	–	0	0	–	3	–	0
$ – Conference champion; There were several SIAA schools that did not field a team due to World War I.

The 1918 Georgia Tech Golden Tornado football team (Note: Although Georgia Tech's teams are officially known as the "Yellow Jackets", northern writers called the team the "Golden Tornado" in 1917; the name was commonly used until 1928 and for many years afterwards as an alternate nickname.) represented the Georgia Institute of Technology during the 1918 Southern Intercollegiate Athletic Association football season. The Tornado was coached by John Heisman in his 15th year as head coach, compiling a record of 6–1 (3–0 SIAA) and outscoring opponents 466 to 32. Georgia Tech played its home games at Grant Field.

Tech eclipsed 100 points three different times. Its only road game was its only loss to national champion Pittsburgh at Forbes Field. Pittsburgh was the only team to score on Tech during the 1918 season. The defeat ended Georgia Tech's 33-game winning streak.

Center Bum Day was recognized as a consensus first-team All-American. He was a first-team selection by Walter Camp; the first Southerner to be chosen for Camp's All-America first team. Bill Fincher and Joe Guyon also made consensus All-America. Fincher and Buck Flowers made Camp's second-team.

== Before the season ==
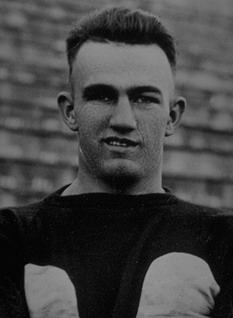
Bill Fincher

Because of America's entry into World War I in April 1917 and the ongoing war effort, several SIAA schools did not field football teams in 1918. Coming off the South's first national championship in 1917, Tech lost several players to the war effort and was heavily reliant on freshmen.

With captain-elect Everett Strupper lost to the war effort, tackle and placekicker Bill Fincher was left as captain. Fincher had a glass eye which he would covertly pull out after feigning an injury, turn to his opponents and say: "So that's how you want to play!"

Coach John Heisman used the pre-snap movement of his "jump shift" offense. Former end and Notre Dame alumnus Fay Wood assisted Heisman as line coach.

Buck Flowers was in his first year on the team. He was a small back who had transferred from Davidson, where last year he starred in the game against Tech. Flowers had grown to weigh 150 pounds and was a backup until Heisman discovered his ability as an open-field runner on punt returns. "Heisman's eyes bulged. And bulged again. On the first punt, Buck ran through the entire first team. Same thing again ... and again. Heisman had uncovered one of the greatest broken-field runners."

== Schedule ==
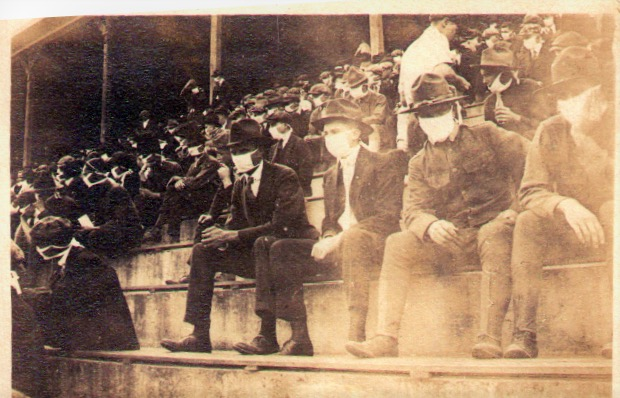
Undetermined home game. Almost everyone in the crowd is wearing masks due to the Spanish flu pandemic.

Date	Opponent	Site	Result	Attendance	Source
October 5	Clemson	Grant Field; Atlanta, GA (rivalry)	W 28–0		
October 12	Furman	Grant Field; Atlanta, GA	W 118–0		
October 19	Georgia Eleventh Cavalry*	Grant Field; Atlanta, GA	W 123–0		
October 26	Camp Gordon*	Grant Field; Atlanta, GA	W 28–0	12,000	
November 9	NC State*	Grant Field; Atlanta, GA	W 128–0		
November 23	at Pittsburgh*	Forbes Field; Pittsburgh, PA	L 0–32	30,000	
November 28	Auburn	Grant Field; Atlanta, GA (rivalry)	W 41–0		
*Non-conference game

== Game summaries ==
=== Clemson ===
Clemson at Georgia Tech

Team	1	2	3	4	Total
Clemson	0	0	0	0	0
• Ga. Tech	0	14	7	7	28

- Date: October 5
- Location: Grant Field
  Atlanta, GA
- Referee: Lieut. Messer

The season opened with a 28–0 defeat of Clemson. During the game, Red Barron hurdled tacklers for a 40-yard gain. The last score came on a 55-yard run by Joe Guyon. Other scores came from Pug Allen and Wally Smith. Former captain Everett Strupper cheered from the sidelines.

The starting lineup was: Fincher (left end), Doyal (left tackle), Nesbit (left guard), Davis (center), Dowling (right guard), Vandegrift (right tackle), Staton (right end), Barron (quarterback), Ferst (left halfback), Guyon (right halfback), and Allen (fullback).

=== Furman ===
Furman at Georgia Tech

Team	1	2	3	4	Total
Furman	0	0	0	0	0
• Ga. Tech	14	35	28	41	118

- Date: October 12
- Location: Grant Field
  Atlanta, GA
- Referee: Lewis (Virginia)

Buck Flowers starred in the 118–0 victory over Furman. Joe Guyon played in the line and did well. Tech made 34 first downs. For one score, in the fourth quarter, Flowers hit Red Barron on a 72-yard touchdown pass that went 42 yards in the air.

The scoring breakdown: Barron got 4 touchdowns, Allen 3, Adams 2, Ferst 2, Guyon, Fincher, Flowers, Smith, Cobb, and Doyal one each. Fincher made 14 straight extra points. Flowers made the other two.

The starting lineup was: Fincher (left end), Doyal (left tackle), Rogers (left guard), Davis (center), Huffines (right guard), Guyon (right tackle), Staton (right end), Barron (quarterback), Flowers (left halfback), Ferst (right halfback), and Allen (fullback).

=== Georgia Eleventh Cavalry ===
Tech beat the Georgia Eleventh Cavalry, 123–0. The game was called after the start of the third quarter. The scoring breakdown: Flowers got 5 touchdowns, Barron 4, Ferst, Allen, and Staton 2 each, Smith, Fincher, and Cobb one each.

=== Camp Gordon ===
Georgia Tech beat Camp Gordon 28–0. Frank Ferst and Red Barron each scored two touchdowns. "Barron had the game of his life" said the yearbook.

The game was nip and tuck until Everett Strupper, former Tech star playing for Gordon, fumbled, and Ferst recovered, racing 30 yards for a touchdown. In the third quarter, Red Barron had a 28-yard touchdown.

=== NC State ===
NC State at Georgia Tech

Team	1	2	3	4	Total
NCST	0	0	0	0	0
• Ga. Tech	33	42	32	21	128

- Date: November 9
- Location: Grant Field
  Atlanta, GA
- Referee: Moriarty

Two days before the Armistice, Tech beat 1918 NC State Aggies football team 128–0. State's only highlight came in the third quarter, when John Ripple recovered a teammate's fumble and returned the ball 75 yards for a touchdown. However, it was called back due to an offsides penalty. Walter Camp attended the game. Ripple became the first football player from North Carolina ever to make an All-America team when he was selected second-team All-American by Camp. Five minutes into the fourth quarter, the game was called. The scoring breakdown: Barron and Ferst got 4 touchdowns each, Smith 3, Allen 3, Staton 2, Cobb 2, and Adams 1.

The starting lineup was: Fincher (left end), Doyal (left tackle), Nesbit (left guard), Day (center), Rogers (right guard), Webb (right tackle), Staton (right end), Barron (quarterback), Ferst (left halfback), Adams (right halfback), and Allen (fullback).

=== Pittsburgh ===
Georgia Tech at Pittsburgh

Team	1	2	3	4	Total
Ga. Tech	0	0	0	0	0
• Pitt	7	7	12	6	32

- Date: November 23
- Location: Forbes Field
  Pittsburgh, PA
- Game attendance: 30,000
- Referee: Tufts (Brown)

After declining the challenge the previous year, Pop Warner's Pittsburgh team was set to play Georgia Tech. In a high-profile game played as a War Charities benefit Pitt dismantled Georgia Tech 32–0, ending Tech's 33-game streak without a loss. Pittsburgh was the 1918 national champion.

Warner historian Francis Powers wrote:

At Forbes Field, the dressing rooms of the two teams were separated only by a thin wall. As the Panthers were sitting around, awaiting Warner's pre-game talk, Heisman began to orate in the adjoining room. In his charge to the Tech squad, Heisman became flowery and fiery. He brought the heroes of ancient Greece and the soldier dead in his armor among the ruins of Pompeii. It was terrific and the Panthers sat, spellbound. When Heisman had finished, Warner chortled and quietly said to his players: 'Okay, boys. There's the speech. Now go out and knock them off.'

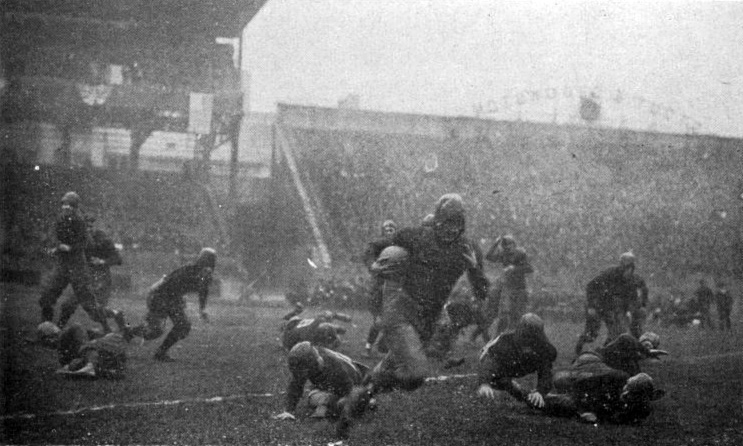
Pitt's Tom Davies runs against Tech.

Tech's play was early hindered by fumbles. One source relates "Guyon and Flowers were very clever at intercepting forward passes, which in a measure made up for the fumbling in an early part of the game." Guyon also starred on defense.

Pitt's first score came on a pass from Tom Davies to Katy Easterday. The next score came soon after the start of the second quarter, when Davies returned a punt back 50 yards for a touchdown. A double pass got the next score. The fourth touchdown was a 6-yard touchdown by George McLaren. A 55-yard touchdown run by Davies was the final score.

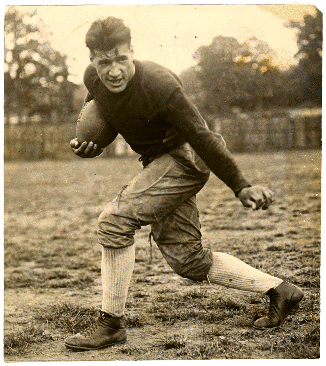
Joe Guyon

Pitt lost its only game to the Cleveland Naval Reserves. On the Naval team was former Tech star Judy Harlan. Harlan stated: "I intercepted a pass and returned it to midfield in the fourth quarter. I felt I at least had evened up some of the losses we had at Tech."

The starting lineup was: Fincher (left end), Doyal (left tackle), Mathes (left guard), Day (center), Huffines (right guard), Webb (right tackle), Staton (right end), Barron (quarterback), Flowers (left halfback), Guyon (right halfback), and Allen (fullback).

=== Auburn ===
Auburn at Georgia Tech

Team	1	2	3	4	Total
Auburn	0	0	0	0	0
• Ga. Tech	14	14	6	7	41

- Date: November 28
- Location: Grant Field
  Atlanta, GA
- Referee: Lambert (Ohio State)

Tech beat Auburn 41–0 on a muddy field. Substitute quarterback B. Adams returned a kickoff 80 yards for a touchdown. The other five touchdowns were achieved by plodding through the mud. The first was on a pass from Buck Flowers to Joe Guyon. Flowers ran in the second, and Guyon ran in the third. Wally Smith made one, and Red Barron the last.

The starting lineup: was Fincher (left end), Doyal (left tackle), Webb (left guard), Day (center), Mathes (right guard), Huffines (right tackle), Staton (right end), Barron (quarterback), Flowers (left halfback), Ferst (right halfback), and Guyon (fullback).

=== Penn ===
Georgia Tech had a scheduled game with Penn in Philadelphia canceled when the Spanish flu swept through the city.

== Postseason ==
=== Awards and honors ===
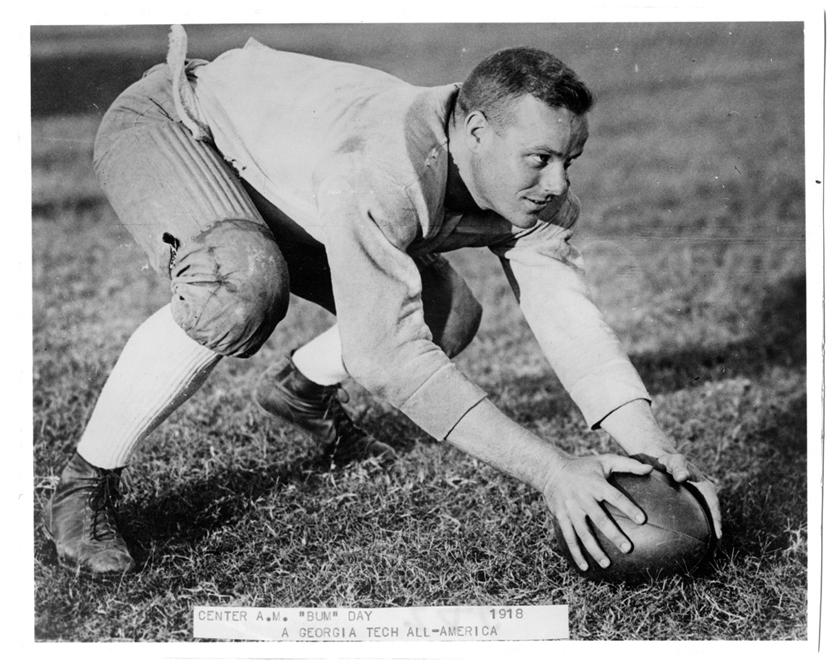
Bum Day

Center Bum Day was recognized as a consensus first-team All-American. He was a first-team selection by Walter Camp. Day's selection by Camp as a first-team All-American was a historic first; he was the first Southerner to be chosen for Camp's annual All-America first team, which had been historically loaded with college players from Harvard, Yale, Princeton, and other Northeastern colleges. Captain Bill Fincher was also a consensus All-American, as well as Joe Guyon. Fincher and halfback Buck Flowers made Camp's second-team All-American.

=== Championships ===
Tech won its fourth straight SIAA title.

== Personnel ==
=== Depth chart ===
The following chart provides a visual depiction of Tech's lineup during the 1918 season with games started at the position reflected in parentheses. The chart mimics the offense after the jump shift has taken place.

LE
Bill Fincher (6)

LT	LG	C	RG	RT
Shorty Doyal (5)	M. M. Nesbit (2)	Bum Day (3)	R. D. Huffines (2)	B. P. Webb (2)
	W. T. Mathis (1)	Oscar Davis (2)	Ham Dowling (1)	Joe Guyon (1)
	J. C. Rogers (1)		W. T. Mathis (1)	R. D. Huffines (1)
	B. P. Webb (1)		J. C. Rogers (1)	Vandegrift (1)

RE
Albert Staton (6)

QB
Red Barron (7)
B. Adams (0)

RHB
Frank Ferst (3)
Joe Guyon (2)
B. Adams (1)
F. R. Cobb (0)

FB
Pug Allen (5)
Joe Guyon (1)

LHB
Buck Flowers (4)
Frank Ferst (3)
Dewey Scarboro (0)
Wally Smith (0)

=== Varsity letterwinners ===
==== Line ====
Player	Position	Games started	Hometown	Prep school	Height	Weight	Age
Oscar Davis	Center, guard	2	Atlanta, Georgia		6'1"	173	18
Bum Day	Center	3	Barnesville, Georgia	Porter Military Academy	5'11"	191	20
Shorty Doyal	Tackle	5	Atlanta, Georgia	Tech High School	6'3"	183	20
Bill Fincher	End, tackle	6	Atlanta, Georgia	Tech High School	6'1"	182	21
R. D. Huffines	Tackle	3	Texas		5'8"	184	20
W. T. Mathis	Guard	2	Jonesboro, Georgia				
M. M. Nesbit	Guard	2	Atlanta, Georgia		5'9"	186	21
J. C. Rogers	Guard	2					
Albert Staton	End	6	Atlanta, Georgia	Boys High School	6'2"	174	18
B. P. Webb	Guard	3					

==== Backfield ====
Number	Player	Position	Games started	Hometown	Prep school	Height	Weight	Age
	Brainard Adams	Quarterback, halfback	1	Atlanta, Georgia	Boys High School	5'10"	151	20
	H. T. "Pug" Allen	Fullback	5	Charleston, South Carolina		6'1"	176	19
	Red Barron	Quarterback	7	Monroe, Georgia		5'11"	166	18
	F. R. Cobb	Halfback	0	Texas		6'0"	155	19
	Verne Davis	Halfback	0	Commerce, Georgia	Commerce High School	5'7"	146	20
	Frank Ferst	Halfback	6	Savannah, Georgia		5'9"	159	19
	Buck Flowers	Halfback	4	Sumter, South Carolina	Sumter High School	5'7"	150	19
27	Joe Guyon	Fullback	4	Magdalena, New Mexico	Carlisle Indian	5'11"	184	24
	Dewey Scarboro	Halfback	0	Moultrie, Georgia	Moultrie High School	5'6"	145	19
	Wally Smith	Halfback	0	Atlanta, Georgia		5'6"	154	21

==== Unlisted ====
- L. M. Lamar

=== Scoring leaders ===
The following is an incomplete list of statistics and scores, largely dependent on newspaper summaries.

Player	Touchdowns	Extra points	Points
Red Barron	15		90
Bill Fincher	2	56	68
Pug Allen	10		60
Frank Ferst	10		60
Buck Flowers	7	2	44
Wally Smith	7		42
B. Adams	4		24
F. R. Cobb	4		24
Joe Guyon	4		24
Albert Staton	4		24
Shorty Doyal	1		6
Total	68	58	466
