= 1918 Sewanee Tigers football team =

American college football season

1918 Sewanee Tigers football
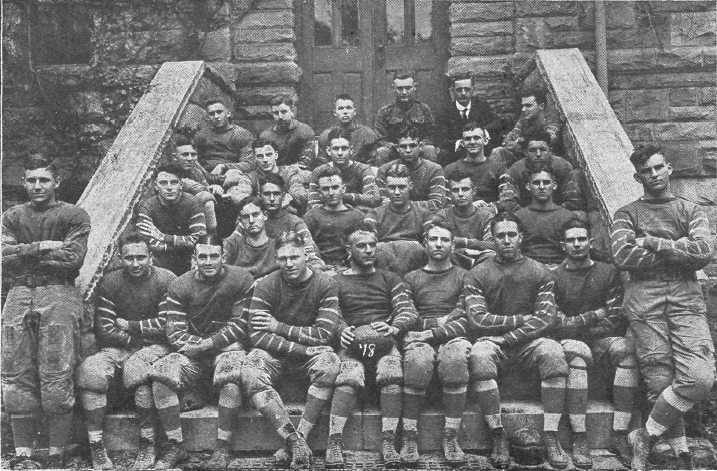
- Conference: Southern Intercollegiate Athletic Association
- Record: 3–2 (0–1 SIAA)
- Head coach: Charles Best (2nd season)
- Captains: James G. Minter; Palmer Woodson
- Home stadium: Hardee Field

1918 Southern Intercollegiate Athletic Association football standings
| | Conf. | | | | | Overall |
| Team | W | | L | | T | W | | L | | T |
|---|---|---|---|---|---|---|---|---|---|---|
| Georgia Tech $ | 3 | – | 0 | – | 0 | 6 | – | 1 | – | 0 |
| Vanderbilt | 2 | – | 0 | – | 0 | 4 | – | 2 | – | 0 |
| Mississippi A&M | 2 | – | 0 | – | 0 | 3 | – | 2 | – | 0 |
| Clemson | 3 | – | 1 | – | 0 | 5 | – | 2 | – | 0 |
| South Carolina | 2 | – | 1 | – | 1 | 2 | – | 1 | – | 1 |
| Furman | 1 | – | 3 | – | 0 | 3 | – | 5 | – | 1 |
| Sewanee | 0 | – | 1 | – | 0 | 3 | – | 2 | – | 0 |
| The Citadel | 0 | – | 1 | – | 1 | 0 | – | 2 | – | 1 |
| Auburn | 0 | – | 2 | – | 0 | 2 | – | 5 | – | 0 |
| Ole Miss | 0 | – | 2 | – | 0 | 1 | – | 3 | – | 0 |
| Wofford | 0 | – | 2 | – | 0 | 0 | – | 3 | – | 0 |
$ – Conference champion; There were several SIAA schools that did not field a team due to World War I.

The 1918 Sewanee Tigers football team represented Sewanee: The University of the South during the 1918 college football season as a member of the Southern Intercollegiate Athletic Association (SIAA). The Tigers were led by head coach Charles Best in his second season and finished with a record of three wins and two losses (3–2 overall, 0–1 in the SIAA). Zach Curlin played for Fort Oglethorpe.

== Schedule ==
| Date | Opponent | Site | Result | Source |
|---|---|---|---|---|
| October 5 | Morgan Training School* | Hardee Field; Sewanee, TN | W 68–6 | |
| October 12 | Camp Greenleaf* | Hardee Field; Sewanee, TN | L 0–14 | |
| November 2 | at Tennessee (SATC)* | Waite Field; Knoxville, TN | W 68–0 | |
| November 22 | vs. Fort Oglethorpe* | Chamberlain Field; Chattanooga, TN | W 24–6 | |
| November 28 | at Vanderbilt | Dudley Field; Nashville, TN (rivalry) | L 0–40 | |
*Non-conference game
