= 1918 Auburn Tigers football team =

American college football season

1918 Auburn Tigers football
- Conference: Southern Intercollegiate Athletic Association
- Record: 2–5 (0–2 SIAA)
- Head coach: Mike Donahue (14th season)
- Base defense: 7–2–2
- Captain: Ike Rogers
- Home stadium: Drake Field; Rickwood Field

1918 Southern Intercollegiate Athletic Association football standings
	Conf.					Overall
Team	W		L		T	W		L		T
Georgia Tech $	3	–	0	–	0	6	–	1	–	0
Vanderbilt	2	–	0	–	0	4	–	2	–	0
Mississippi A&M	2	–	0	–	0	3	–	2	–	0
Clemson	3	–	1	–	0	5	–	2	–	0
South Carolina	2	–	1	–	1	2	–	1	–	1
Furman	1	–	3	–	0	3	–	5	–	1
Sewanee	0	–	1	–	0	3	–	2	–	0
The Citadel	0	–	1	–	1	0	–	2	–	1
Auburn	0	–	2	–	0	2	–	5	–	0
Ole Miss	0	–	2	–	0	1	–	3	–	0
Wofford	0	–	2	–	0	0	–	3	–	0
$ – Conference champion; There were several SIAA schools that did not field a team due to World War I.

The 1918 Auburn Tigers football team represented Auburn University in the 1918 college football season. It was the Tigers' 27th season and they competed as a member of the Southern Intercollegiate Athletic Association (SIAA). The team was led by head coach Mike Donahue, in his 14th year, and played their home games at Drake Field in Auburn, Alabama. They finished with a record of two wins and five losses (2–5 overall, 0–2 in the SIAA).

== Schedule ==
Date	Opponent	Site	Result	Attendance	Source
October 19	Oglethorpe*	Drake Field; Auburn, AL	W 58–0		
October 26	Camp Greenleaf*	Drake Field; Auburn, AL	L 0–26		
November 3	at Marion*	Marion, AL	W 20–6		
November 9	vs. Camp Gordon*	Memorial Stadium; Columbus, GA	L 6–14	5,000	
November 16	Vanderbilt	Rickwood Field; Birmingham, AL	L 0–21		
November 28	at Georgia Tech	Grant Field; Atlanta, GA	L 0–41		
December 7	Camp Sheridan*	Soldiers Field; Montgomery, AL	L 0–7		
*Non-conference game
