= 1918 Clemson Tigers football team =

American college football season

1918 Clemson Tigers football
- Conference: Southern Intercollegiate Athletic Association
- Record: 5–2 (3–1 SIAA)
- Head coach: Edward Donahue (2nd season)
- Captain: Stumpy Banks
- Home stadium: Riggs Field

1918 Southern Intercollegiate Athletic Association football standings
	Conf.					Overall
Team	W		L		T	W		L		T
Georgia Tech $	3	–	0	–	0	6	–	1	–	0
Vanderbilt	2	–	0	–	0	4	–	2	–	0
Mississippi A&M	2	–	0	–	0	3	–	2	–	0
Clemson	3	–	1	–	0	5	–	2	–	0
South Carolina	2	–	1	–	1	2	–	1	–	1
Furman	1	–	3	–	0	3	–	5	–	1
Sewanee	0	–	1	–	0	3	–	2	–	0
The Citadel	0	–	1	–	1	0	–	2	–	1
Auburn	0	–	2	–	0	2	–	5	–	0
Ole Miss	0	–	2	–	0	1	–	3	–	0
Wofford	0	–	2	–	0	0	–	3	–	0
$ – Conference champion; There were several SIAA schools that did not field a team due to World War I.

The 1918 Clemson Tigers football team represented Clemson Agricultural College—now known as Clemson University—as a member of the Southern Intercollegiate Athletic Association (SIAA) during the 1918 college football season. Under second-year head coach Edward Donahue, the team posted an overall record of 5–2 with a mark of 3–1 in SIAA play. Stumpy Banks was the team captain.

== Schedule ==
Date	Opponent	Site	Result	Source
September 27	Camp Sevier*	Riggs Field; Calhoun, SC	W 61–0	
October 5	at Georgia Tech	Grant Field; Atlanta, GA (rivalry)	L 0–28	
November 2	at South Carolina	University Field; Columbia, SC (rivalry)	W 39–0	
November 9	Camp Hancock*	Riggs Field; Calhoun, SC	L 13–64	
November 16	vs. The Citadel	Davis Field; Columbia, SC	W 7–0	
November 23	Furman	Riggs Field; Calhoun, SC	W 68–7	
November 28	Davidson*	Riggs Field; Calhoun, SC	W 7–0	
*Non-conference game
