= 1918 South Carolina Gamecocks football team =

American college football season

1918 South Carolina Gamecocks football
- Conference: Southern Intercollegiate Athletic Association
- Record: 2–1–1 (2–1–1 SIAA)
- Head coach: Frank Dobson (1st season)
- Captain: J. H. Moore
- Home stadium: University Field

1918 Southern Intercollegiate Athletic Association football standings
	Conf.					Overall
Team	W		L		T	W		L		T
Georgia Tech $	3	–	0	–	0	6	–	1	–	0
Vanderbilt	2	–	0	–	0	4	–	2	–	0
Mississippi A&M	2	–	0	–	0	3	–	2	–	0
Clemson	3	–	1	–	0	5	–	2	–	0
South Carolina	2	–	1	–	1	2	–	1	–	1
Furman	1	–	3	–	0	3	–	5	–	1
Sewanee	0	–	1	–	0	3	–	2	–	0
The Citadel	0	–	1	–	1	0	–	2	–	1
Auburn	0	–	2	–	0	2	–	5	–	0
Ole Miss	0	–	2	–	0	1	–	3	–	0
Wofford	0	–	2	–	0	0	–	3	–	0
$ – Conference champion; There were several SIAA schools that did not field a team due to World War I.

The 1918 South Carolina Gamecocks football team represented the University of South Carolina during the 1918 Southern Intercollegiate Athletic Association football season. Led by Frank Dobson in his first and only season as head coach, the Gamecocks compiled an overall record of 2–1–1 with an identical mark in SIAA play.

== Schedule ==
Date	Time	Opponent	Site	Result	Source
November 2		Clemson	University Field; Columbia, SC	L 0–39	
November 16	3:30 p.m.	at Furman	Greenville, SC	W 20–12	
November 23		Wofford	University Field; Columbia, SC	W 13–0	
November 28		vs. The Citadel	County Fairgrounds; Orangeburg, SC	T 0–0	
All times are in Eastern time
