= 1918 Vanderbilt Commodores football team =

American college football season

1918 Vanderbilt Commodores football
- Conference: Southern Intercollegiate Athletic Association
- Record: 4–2 (2–0 SIAA)
- Head coach: Ray Morrison (1st season)
- Offensive scheme: Short punt
- Captain: Herman Daves
- Home stadium: Dudley Field

1918 Southern Intercollegiate Athletic Association football standings
	Conf.					Overall
Team	W		L		T	W		L		T
Georgia Tech $	3	–	0	–	0	6	–	1	–	0
Vanderbilt	2	–	0	–	0	4	–	2	–	0
Mississippi A&M	2	–	0	–	0	3	–	2	–	0
Clemson	3	–	1	–	0	5	–	2	–	0
South Carolina	2	–	1	–	1	2	–	1	–	1
Furman	1	–	3	–	0	3	–	5	–	1
Sewanee	0	–	1	–	0	3	–	2	–	0
The Citadel	0	–	1	–	1	0	–	2	–	1
Auburn	0	–	2	–	0	2	–	5	–	0
Ole Miss	0	–	2	–	0	1	–	3	–	0
Wofford	0	–	2	–	0	0	–	3	–	0
$ – Conference champion; There were several SIAA schools that did not field a team due to World War I.

The 1918 Vanderbilt Commodores football team represented Vanderbilt University in the 1918 Southern Intercollegiate Athletic Association football season, which was interim head coach Ray Morrison's first year as a head coach. Morrison was asked to fill in for Dan McGugin who was in the United States Army at the time.

== Schedule ==
Date	Time	Opponent	Site	Result	Source
October 19		Camp Greenleaf*	Dudley Field; Nashville, TN	L 0–6	
October 26		Camp Hancock*	Dudley Field; Nashville, TN	L 6–25	
November 2		Kentucky*	Dudley Field; Nashville, TN (rivalry)	W 33–0	
November 9	2:30 p.m.	Tennessee (SATC)*	Dudley Field; Nashville, TN	W 76–0	
November 16		at Auburn	Rickwood Field; Birmingham, AL	W 21–0	
November 28		Sewanee	Dudley Field; Nashville, TN (rivalry)	W 40–0	
*Non-conference game

== Background ==
The Commodores usual coach, Dan McGugin, was on leave from Vanderbilt for Army duty, leaving future Vanderbilt head coach Ray Morrison as the interim head coach. Coach Morrison played at Vanderbilt from 1908 to 1911 playing halfback and quarterback for McGugin. After leaving Vanderbilt as a player he moved to coaching; his first head coaching job was at SMU from 1915 to 1916 and from 1922 to 1934. (Note: In 1935 he again replaced McGugin as head coach. He was head coach at Vanderbilt from 1935 to 1939 when Morrison resigned from his position at Vanderbilt to coach at Temple,)

== Game summaries ==
=== Camp Hancock ===
Vanderbilt lost to Camp Hancock 25–6. Howard Berry's end runs featured on a muddy field. The ball was in Vanderbilt's territory most of the game, and the score would have been worse but for Vanderbilt's defense. Vanderbilt's touchdown came on a blocked punt.

=== Tennessee ===
Vanderbilt program considers the game between the two schools as an official game, however, University of Tennessee does not since most of their team was enlisted in the military fighting in World War I. (Note: The day before, Germany agreed to the surrender terms dictated by President Woodrow Wilson to end World War I (the armistice became effective on November 11). Tennessee Athletic Council officially suspended varsity football. This was necessary since Vols' Coach John Bender was enlisted in the military as an instructor in South Carolina and the majority of his players were called into military service.)

During the two-year period of 1917 and 1918 without varsity football, two unofficial teams were formed from Army recruits and students. One of these unofficial teams that represented the University of Tennessee was the Student Army Training Corps, which came to play in Nashville in 1918. There was a game played that afternoon on Vanderbilt's original Dudley Field. (Note: The name of the second Vols' football team that represented the university in 1918 was the "Fighting Mechanics". Their results are listed as 'no official teams.' The week before the Vanderbilt game the University of Tennessee opened their season with a loss to Sewanee by a similar score of 68–0. Tennessee finished the season with a 3–2 record, with wins over Maryville (9–7), Milligan (32–0) and Tennessee Military Institute (46–0).) According to the Nashville Tennessean and the Nashville American, the game was to benefit the United War Work Fund. Reserved seats were $1.00. "When the Tennessee clan comes down from the eastern mountains and comes to Dudley Field around 2:30 o'clock today, the Commodores will have quite a little argument to settle with them. It dates back to the fall of 1916, when the Vol eleven surprised Vandy with a 10−6 defeat and then crawled into their hole for two years gloating over their accomplishment. Yes, the Black and Gold must be vindicated today."

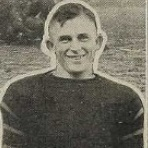
Grailey Berryhill

The Journal and Tribune in Knoxville reported before the game, "It is expected that the Orange and White players will give a good account of themselves in the game today, when the S.A.T.C. eleven goes against Vanderbilt, at Nashville." This is a clear reference to the football team representing UT as the Student Army Training Corps.

Vanderbilt won the game by a score of 74–0 (both media guides report 76–0) and the Vols were always referred to as the University of Tennessee and not Student Army Training Corps.

The Journal and Tribune reported on the game's results: "Against the University of Tennessee weak resistance, the Vanderbilt football eleven today ran rampant and piled up a score of 74−0. (Grailey) Berryhill, the sensational Vanderbilt back, had one of the greatest days of his football career accounting for six of the eleven's dozen touchdowns against the Knoxville clan." Sports writer Cicero Slack of the Tennessean wrote: "Crumbling the University of Tennessee eleven like to a page of tissue in the mailed fist of a giant, the Commodores yesterday out on Dudley Field walked over their prostrate foe to a 74−0 victory and gained sweet revenge for the 1916 defeat." Berryhill's six touchdowns are not in the Vanderbilt record book probably because this would not be considered the modern era. Frank Mordica's five touchdowns in 1978 are listed as the Vanderbilt record for most touchdowns in a single game.

An authority on Vanderbilt football history was the late Nashville Banner sportswriter Fred Russell. In Russell's book Fifty Years of Vanderbilt Football published in 1938, he writes about the 1918 Vanderbilt–Tennessee football game:

"Salient after salient was wiped out by Gen. Morrison's forces and Tennessee's reinforcements could not check the tide. The retreat turned into a bloody, hopeless rout. Berryhill was cited for bravery for his wonderful outflanking the enemy, by which he took six positions (touchdowns) single-handedly. The result was 76−0." Russell records the game in his book as a victory for the Commodores.

The starting lineup was Baker (left end), Daves (left tackle), Smith (left guard), Hill (center), Reeves (right guard), Owens (right tackle), Gore (right end), Sherman (quarterback), Hickman (left half), Berryhill (right half), Beasley (fullback).

=== Sewanee ===
Sewanee at Vanderbilt

Team	1	2	3	4	Total
Sewanee	0	0	0	0	0
• Vanderbilt	0	12	7	21	40

- Date: November 28
- Location: Dudley Field
  Nashville, Tennessee
- Referee: Bill Streit

Vanderbilt beat the rival Sewanee Tigers 40–0, a larger score than had been expected. Bunt Beasley was the star of the game, scoring three touchdowns.

The starting lineup was Baker (left end), Davis (left tackle), Reed (left guard), Early (center), Reeves (right guard), Owen (right tackle), Goar (right end), Sherman (quarterback), Berryhill (left halfback), Lockman (right halfback), Beasley (fullback).
