= 1918 The Citadel Bulldogs football team =

American college football season

1918 The Citadel Bulldogs football
- Conference: Southern Intercollegiate Athletic Association
- Record: 0–2–1 (0–1–1 SIAA)
- Head coach: Harry J. O'Brien (3rd season)
- Home stadium: College Park Stadium

1918 Southern Intercollegiate Athletic Association football standings
	Conf.					Overall
Team	W		L		T	W		L		T
Georgia Tech $	3	–	0	–	0	6	–	1	–	0
Vanderbilt	2	–	0	–	0	4	–	2	–	0
Mississippi A&M	2	–	0	–	0	3	–	2	–	0
Clemson	3	–	1	–	0	5	–	2	–	0
South Carolina	2	–	1	–	1	2	–	1	–	1
Furman	1	–	3	–	0	3	–	5	–	1
Sewanee	0	–	1	–	0	3	–	2	–	0
The Citadel	0	–	1	–	1	0	–	2	–	1
Auburn	0	–	2	–	0	2	–	5	–	0
Ole Miss	0	–	2	–	0	1	–	3	–	0
Wofford	0	–	2	–	0	0	–	3	–	0
$ – Conference champion; There were several SIAA schools that did not field a team due to World War I.

The 1918 The Citadel Bulldogs football team represented The Citadel Academy in the 1918 Southern Intercollegiate Athletic Association football season. Harry J. O'Brien served as coach for the third season. The Bulldogs played as members of the Southern Intercollegiate Athletic Association and played home games at College Park Stadium in Hampton Park. The 1918 season was interrupted by World War I and the Spanish flu, resulting in just a three-game schedule for the Bulldogs, all taking place after Armistice Day.

== Schedule ==
Date	Opponent	Site	Result	Source
November 16	vs. Clemson	Davis Field; Columbia, SC	L 0–7	
November 23	Charleston Navy*	College Park Stadium; Charleston, SC	L 0–6	
November 28	vs. South Carolina	County Fairgrounds; Orangeburg, SC	T 0–0	
*Non-conference game
