= 1918 Furman Baptists football team =

American college football season

1918 Furman Baptists football
- Conference: Southern Intercollegiate Athletic Association
- Record: 3–5–1 (1–3 SIAA)
- Head coach: Billy Laval (4th season)
- Home stadium: Furman campus

1918 Southern Intercollegiate Athletic Association football standings
	Conf.					Overall
Team	W		L		T	W		L		T
Georgia Tech $	3	–	0	–	0	6	–	1	–	0
Vanderbilt	2	–	0	–	0	4	–	2	–	0
Mississippi A&M	2	–	0	–	0	3	–	2	–	0
Clemson	3	–	1	–	0	5	–	2	–	0
South Carolina	2	–	1	–	1	2	–	1	–	1
Furman	1	–	3	–	0	3	–	5	–	1
Sewanee	0	–	1	–	0	3	–	2	–	0
The Citadel	0	–	1	–	1	0	–	2	–	1
Auburn	0	–	2	–	0	2	–	5	–	0
Ole Miss	0	–	2	–	0	1	–	3	–	0
Wofford	0	–	2	–	0	0	–	3	–	0
$ – Conference champion; There were several SIAA schools that did not field a team due to World War I.

The 1918 Furman Baptists football team represented Furman University during the 1918 Southern Intercollegiate Athletic Association football season. Led by fourth-year head coach Billy Laval, Furman compiled an overall record of 3–5–1 with a mark of 1–3 in SIAA play.

== Schedule ==
Date	Time	Opponent	Site	Result	Attendance	Source
October 12		at Georgia Tech	Grant Field; Atlanta, GA	L 0–118		
October 26	3:30 p.m.	48th Infantry*	Greenville, SC	W 26–0		
November 2	3:30 p.m.	48th Infantry*	Furman campus; Greenville, SC	W 20–7	3,000	
November 9	3:00 p.m.	Erskine*	Furman campus; Greenville, SC	T 6–6		
November 16	3:30 p.m.	South Carolina	Furman campus; Greenville, SC	L 12–20		
November 23		at Clemson	Riggs Field; Calhoun, SC	L 7–68		
November 30	3:00 p.m.	2nd Development Regiment*	Furman campus; Greenville, SC	L 7–13	1,000	
December 4	3:00 p.m.	at Wofford	Spartanburg, SC (rivalry)	W 7–0		
December 7	3:00 p.m.	Presbyterian*	Greenville, SC	L 7–13		
*Non-conference game; All times are in Eastern time
