= Payne Field =

Former World War I military airfield

- West Point, Mississippi
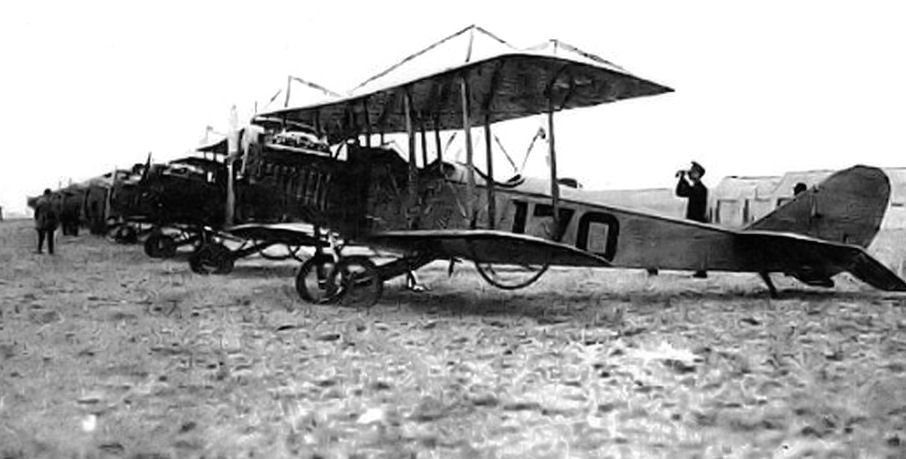
- Payne Field - parked Curtiss JN-4 Training Aircraft, 1918

Site information
- Type: Primary pilot training airfield
- Controlled by: Air Service, United States Army
- Condition: abandoned fields

Location
- Location within Mississippi
- Coordinates: 33°39′56″N 88°38′57″W

Site history
- Built: 1917
- In use: 1918–1920
- Battles/wars: World War I

Garrison information
- Garrison: Training Section, Air Service

Payne Field is a former World War I military airfield, located 4.3 miles (6.9 km) north-northeast of West Point, Mississippi. It operated as a training field for the United States Army Air Service between 1918 until 1920.

The airfield was one of thirty-two Air Service training camps established in 1917 after the United States entry into World War I. It was the first airport constructed in Mississippi.

== History ==
Payne Field was named in memory of Captain Dewitt Payne. A native of South Bend, Indiana, Payne graduated from the University of Michigan in 1912 and the School of Military Aeronautics at the University of Illinois, where he was commissioned as a First Lieutenant and sent to Hazelhurst Field, Long Island, New York. Promoted to captain in October, 1917, Payne was transferred to Taliaferro Field, near Fort Worth, Texas. There, on 1 February 1918, Payne was flying to the aid of a pilot who had crashed into the top of a tree and crashed his own plane in the process. He died from the injuries sustained in the crash.

=== World War I ===
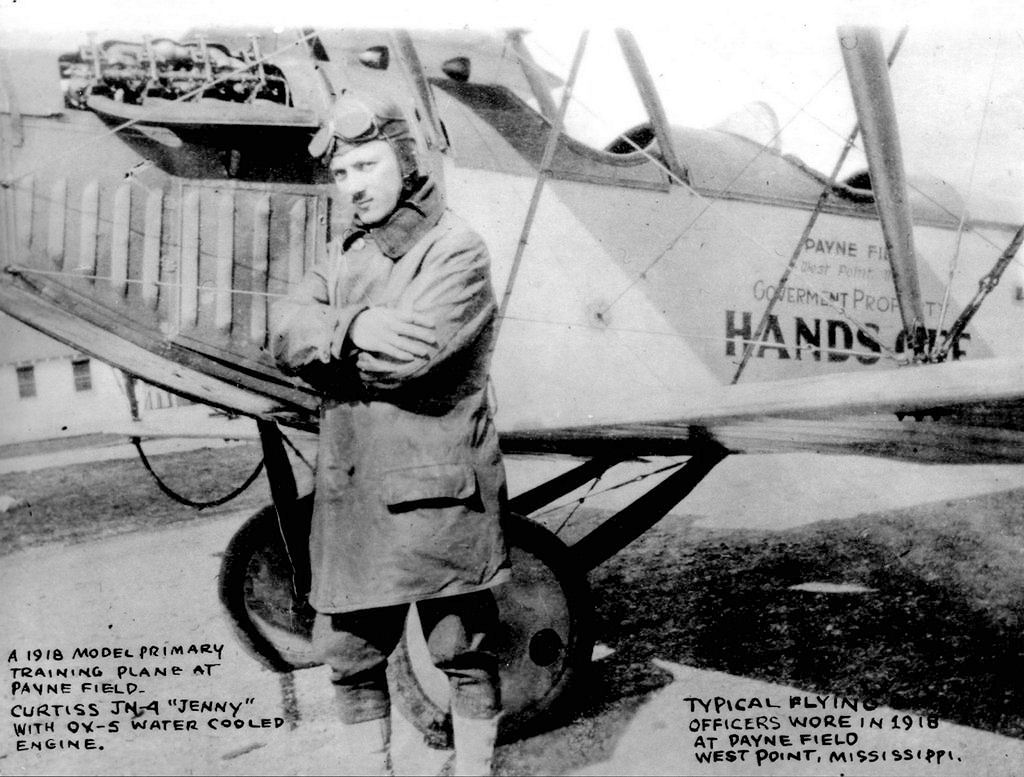
Lt. Harry Crook, an instructor, stands next to a JN4-D Jenny trainer

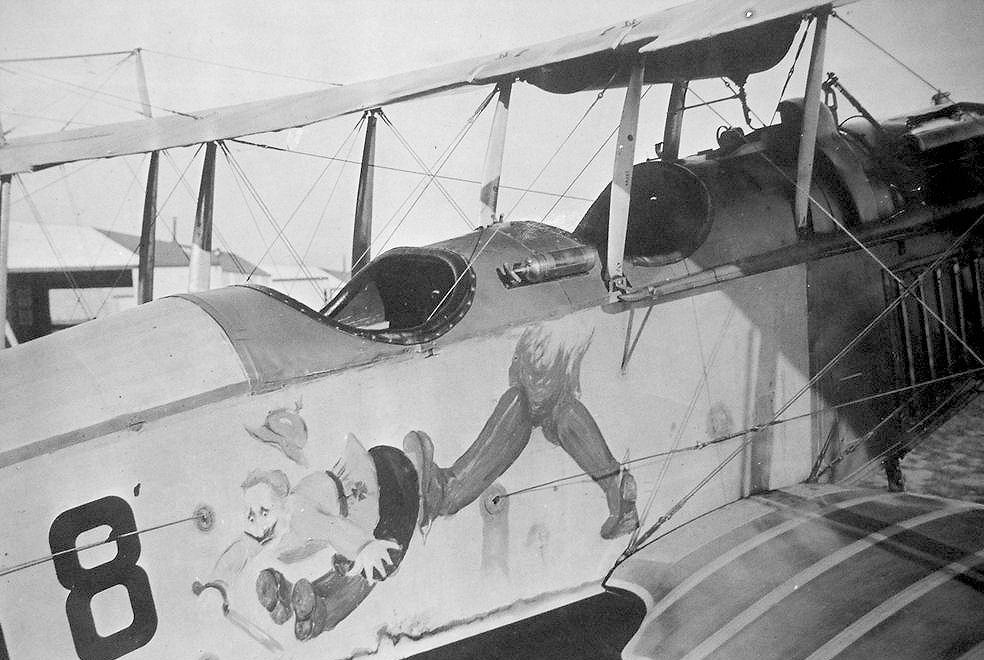
Fuselage art on a JN-4 at Payne Field

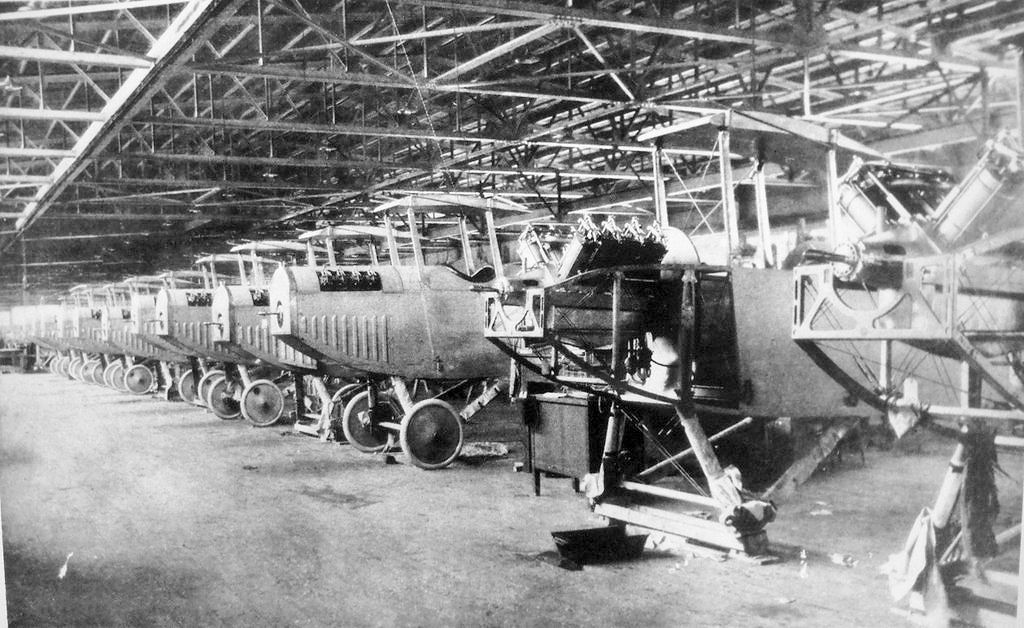
JN-4 repair shop, Payne Field

During World War I, Payne Field was used as a training facility for military pilots. In November 1917, the Department of War sent a cadre of officers to the Columbus, Mississippi area to survey sites for an aviation school. The group decided on a location about 5 miles northeast of West Point, Mississippi. An agreement to lease the land for the Army was concluded.

The field consisted of 533 acres and was constructed at a cost of $891,340 and could accommodate up to 1,000 personnel. Dozens of wooden buildings served as headquarters, maintenance, and officers’ quarters. Enlisted men had to bivouac in tents. The commander of Payne Field was Lt. Col. Jack W. Heard. Heard was a career army officer, a West Point graduate (class of 1910), and the son of Medal of Honor John W. Heard, a native of Woodstock, Mississippi. After graduation from West Point, Heard was assigned to the 7th Cavalry (George Custer’s old regiment) and was sent to the Philippines. It was here that Heard first became interested in the new phenomenon of flying, and after several applications for transfer he was finally approved for the Aviation Section of the Signal Corps and earned his pilot's certificate. Quickly rising in the ranks of the Air Corps, he went on to command three training bases during the First World War: Kelly Field in Texas, Scott Field in Illinois, and Payne Field.

The first units stationed at Payne arrived in April, 1918, being transferred from Kelly and Ellington Fields, Texas. However, only a few U.S. Army Air Service aircraft arrived with the squadrons. Most of the Curtiss JN-4 Jennys to be used for flight training were shipped in wooden crates by railcar.

Payne Field served as a base for flight training for the United States Army Air Service. In 1918, flight training occurred in two phases: primary and advanced. Primary training took eight weeks and consisted of pilots learning basic flight skills under dual and solo instruction with a student capacity of 300. After completion of their primary training, flight cadets were then transferred to another base for advanced training. Training units assigned to Payne Field were:

- Post Headquarters, Payne Field
- 175th Aero Squadron, April, 1918 (Transferred from: Ellington Field, Texas)

Re-designated as Squadron "A", July–November 1918

- 238th Aero Squadron (II), April 1918 (Transferred from: Kelly Field, Texas)

Re-designated as Squadron "B", July–November 1918

- 239th Aero Squadron (II), April 1918 (Transferred from: Kelly Field, Texas)

Re-designated as Squadron "C", July–November 1918

- 252d Aero Squadron, April 1918 (Transferred from: Ellington Field, Texas)

Re-designated as Squadron "D", July–November 1918

- Flying School Detachment (Consolidation of Squadrons A-D), November 1918- November 1919

In all some 1,500 pilots trained at the field during its operation. Accidents were frequent and in the first four months of operation there were four fatal plane crashes. Airplane crashes, however, were not the primary health concern. In June 1918, the Surgeon General of the Public Health Service stated that Payne Field; "was located in one of the worst malaria belts of the United States." Physicians there reported that 20 percent of their practice consisted of malaria cases.

With the sudden end of World War I in November 1918, the future operational status of Payne Field was unknown. Many local officials speculated that the U.S. government would keep the field open because of the outstanding combat record established by Payne-trained pilots in Europe. Cadets in flight training on 11 November 1918 were allowed to complete their training, however no new cadets were assigned to the base. Also the separate training squadrons were consolidated into a single Flying School detachment, as many of the personnel assigned were being demobilized.

=== Closure ===
Payne Field played a role in one of the milestones of aviation. The first North American transcontinental round trip flight occurred in 1919. The flight by Major Theodore Macauley and his mechanic, Pvt. Staley, began in January 1919. Macauley was flying west from Montgomery, Alabama, in a De Havilland DH-4 when its propeller was damaged during a rain storm. He was able to land at Payne Field for repairs and then continued on to complete his historic trip. There was, though, a delay of over a week at Payne Field as all of the rain had made the runway too muddy for the De Havilland to take off.

With the end of World War I, in December 1919 Payne Field was deactivated as an active duty airfield, however, and a small caretaker unit was assigned to the facility for administrative reasons. It was used by the aerial forestry patrol. It also was used intermittently to support small military units. However, the decision had been made to phase down all activities at the base in accordance with sharply reduced military budgets. and it was closed.

The base closed in March 1920. Shortly after it closed the Inter-State Airplane Co. of Dallas, Texas, purchased much of the field. Their plan was to develop a "municipal flying field" with passenger service from the east to Shreveport, Louisiana, Dallas, Ft. Worth and Wichita Falls, Texas. Apparently it was a plan that never materialized and the former air field is now agricultural land and thickets with no indication that it had once been a busy military base.

=== Civil use ===
After Payne Field closed, Colonel Jack Heard moved on to other fields of endeavor. After organizing the Flying Circus (a forerunner of the USAF Thunderbirds) in 1919, Heard went back to the cavalry and then transitioned into mechanized cavalry, ultimately commanding the 5th Armored Division. A man of varied interests, including coin and stamp collecting, astronomy, rose culture, history and finance, he retired in 1946 as a Major General and died at Brooke Army Hospital, San Antonio, Texas, in 1976.

== See also ==
- United States Army World War I Flight Training
