= 1910 Southern Intercollegiate Athletic Association football season =

- League: NCAA
- Sport: College football
- Duration: September 24, 1910 through December 3, 1910
- Teams: 14

Regular Season
- Season champions: Vanderbilt; Auburn

Football seasons
- 1909 1911

1910 Southern Intercollegiate Athletic Association football standings
	Conf.					Overall
Team	W		L		T	W		L		T
Vanderbilt +	5	–	0	–	0	8	–	0	–	1
Auburn +	5	–	0	–	0	6	–	1	–	0
Sewanee	3	–	1	–	0	8	–	2	–	0
Georgia	4	–	2	–	1	6	–	2	–	1
Ole Miss	2	–	1	–	0	7	–	1	–	0
Mississippi A&M	3	–	2	–	0	7	–	2	–	0
Mercer	3	–	2	–	0	6	–	3	–	0
Georgia Tech	3	–	3	–	0	5	–	3	–	0
Clemson	2	–	3	–	1	4	–	3	–	1
LSU	1	–	3	–	0	1	–	5	–	0
Tennessee	1	–	4	–	0	3	–	5	–	1
The Citadel	0	–	2	–	0	3	–	4	–	0
Alabama	0	–	4	–	0	4	–	4	–	0
Howard (AL)	0	–	5	–	0	1	–	8	–	0
+ – Conference co-champions

The 1910 Southern Intercollegiate Athletic Association football season was the college football games played by the member schools of the Southern Intercollegiate Athletic Association as part of the 1910 college football season. The season began on September 24.

Vanderbilt lineman Will Metzger was selected third-team All-American by Walter Camp, the third player from the South ever to receive such an honor.

== Results and team statistics ==
Conf. Rank	Team	Head coach	Overall record	Conf. record	PPG	PAG
1 (tie)	Vanderbilt	Dan McGugin	8–0–1	5–0	18.4	**0.9**
1 (tie)	Auburn	Mike Donahue	6–1	4–0	25.1	1.3
3	Sewanee	Harris G. Cope	8–2	3–1	28.5	6.4
4	Georgia	W. A. Cunningham	6–2–1	4–2–1	**31.2**	5.8
5	Ole Miss	Nathan Stauffer	7–1	2–1	18.00	1.13
6 (tie)	Mississippi A&M	W. D. Chadwick	7–2	3–2	24.3	4.0
6 (tie)	Mercer	Charles C. Stroud	6–3	3–2	13.2	8.1
7	Georgia Tech	John Heisman	5–3	3–3	24.6	6.3
8	Clemson	Bob Williams	4–3–1	2–3–1	13.3	6.8
9	Tennessee	Lex Stone	3–5–1	1–4	5.6	14.9
10	The Citadel	Sam Costen	3–4	0–2	3.7	10.7
11	LSU	John W. Mayhew	1–5	0–3	7.5	19.8
12	Alabama	Guy Lowman	4–4	0–4	8.1	13.4
13	Howard (AL)	James C. Donnelly	1–8	0–5	1.11	33.78

Key

PPG = Average of points scored per game
PAG = Average of points allowed per game

=== Regular season ===
Index to colors and formatting
Non-conference matchup; SIAA member won
Non-conference matchup; SIAA member lost
Non-conference matchup; tie
Conference matchup

SIAA teams in bold.

==== Week One ====
Date	Visiting team	Home team	Site	Result	Attendance	Reference
September 24	Locust Grove Institute	**Mercer**	Central City Park • Macon, GA	**W** 32–0		
September 24	Gordon	**Clemson**	Bowman Field • Calhoun, SC	**W** 26–0		

==== Week Two ====
Date	Visiting team	Home team	Site	Result	Attendance	Reference
October 1	Mooney	Vanderbilt	Dudley Field • Nashville, TN	**W** 34–0	1,500	
October 1	Central University	Tennessee	Waite Field • Knoxville, TN	**L** 2–17		
October 1	Birmingham	Alabama	The Quad • Tuscaloosa, AL	**W** 25–0		
October 1	Locust Grove Institute	Georgia	Herty Field • Athens, GA	**W** 101–0		
October 1	Gordon	Georgia Tech	Piedmont Park • Atlanta, GA	**W** 57–0		
October 1	Memphis High School	Ole Miss	Oxford, MS	**W** 10–0		
October 1	Mississippi College	Mississippi A&M	Hardy Field • Starkville, MS	**W** 24–0		
October 1	**Mercer**	Clemson	Bowman Field • Calhoun, SC	**MER** 3–0		
October 1	Blountsville Agricultural	Howard (AL)	West End Park • Birmingham, AL	**W** 10–0		
October 3	Sewanee Military Academy	Sewanee	Hardee Field • Sewanee, TN	**W** 53–0		

==== Week Three ====
Date	Visiting team	Home team	Site	Result	Attendance	Reference
October 5	University of Memphis	Ole Miss	Oxford, MS	**W** 2–0		
October 8	Marion	Alabama	The Quad • Tuscaloosa, AL	**W** 26–0		
October 8	**Mississippi A&M**	Auburn	Drill Field • Auburn, AL	**AUB** 6–0		
October 8	**Clemson**	Howard (AL)	Alabama State Fairgrounds • Birmingham, AL	**CLEM** 24–0		
October 8	Gordon	Georgia	Herty Field • Athens, GA	**W** 79–0		
October 8	Chattanooga	Georgia Tech	Piedmont Park • Atlanta, GA	**W** 18–0		
October 8	Georgia Medical	Mercer	Central City Park • Macon, GA	**W** 22–0		
October 8	Anderson Training School	Sewanee	Hardee Field • Sewanee, TN	**W** 27–0		
October 8	Mooney	Tennessee	Waite Field • Knoxville, TN	**W** 7–0		
October 8	Rose Polytechnic	Vanderbilt	Dudley Field • Nashville, TN	**W** 23–0		

==== Week Four ====
Date	Visiting team	Home team	Site	Result	Attendance	Reference
October 12	Castle Heights	**Vanderbilt**	Dudley Field • Nashville, TN	**W** 14–0		
October 12	Tennessee Military Institute	**Sewanee**	Hardee Field • Sewanee, TN	**W** 95–0		
October 13	**Ole Miss**	Tulane	Tulane Stadium • New Orleans, LA	**W** 16–0		
October 15	**Auburn**	**Howard (AL)**	West End Park • Birmingham, AL	**AUB** 78–0		
October 15	**Clemson**	**The Citadel**	College Park Stadium • Charleston, SC	**CLEM** 32–0		
October 15	**Georgia**	**Alabama**	Alabama State Fairgrounds • Birmingham, AL	**UGA** 22–0		
October 15	**Mercer**	**Georgia Tech**	Ponce de Leon Park • Atlanta, GA	**GT** 46–0		
October 15	Mississippi College	**LSU**	State Field • Baton Rouge, LA	**W** 40–0		
October 15	University of Memphis	**Mississippi A&M**	Hardy Field • Starkville, MS	**W** 6–0		
October 15	**Tennessee**	**Vanderbilt**	Dudley Field • Nashville, TN	**VAN** 18–0		

==== Week Five ====
Date	Visiting team	Home team	Site	Result	Attendance	Reference
October 17	**Sewanee**	Central University	Eclipse Park • Louisville, KY	**L** 0–19		
October 21	**LSU**	**Mississippi A&M**	Columbus Fairgrounds • Columbus, MS	**MSA&M** 3–0		
October 21	Morgan Training School	**Sewanee**	Hardee Field • Sewanee, TN	**W** 22–5		
October 22	**Ole Miss**	Mississippi College	Clinton, MS	**W** 24–0		
October 22	**Howard (AL)**	Southern (AL)	Vandiver Park • Montgomery, AL	**L** 0–5		
October 22	**Clemson**	**Auburn**	Drill Field • Auburn, AL	**AUB** 17–0		
October 22	**The Citadel**	College of Charleston	College Park Stadium • Charleston, SC	**L** 0–11		
October 22	**Tennessee**	**Georgia**	Herty Field • Athens, GA	**UGA** 35–6		
October 22	Florida	**Mercer**	Central City Park • Macon, GA	**W** 13–0		
October 22	**Georgia Tech**	**Alabama**	The Quad • Tuscaloosa, AL	**GT** 36–0		
October 22	**Vanderbilt**	Yale	Yale Field • New Haven, CT	**T** 0–0		

==== Week Six ====
Date	Visiting team	Home team	Site	Result	Attendance	Reference
October 29	Wake Forest	**The Citadel**	College Park Stadium • Charleston, SC	**W** 9–5		
October 29	**Mercer**	**Georgia**	Herty Field • Athens, GA	**UGA** 21–0		
October 29	**Tennessee**	**Howard (AL)**	Alabama State Fairgrounds • Birmingham, AL	**TENN** 17–0		
October 29	**Sewanee**	**LSU**	Pelican Park • New Orleans, LA	**SEW** 31–5		
October 29	**Auburn**	Texas	Clark Field • Austin, TX	**L** 0–9		
October 29	**Ole Miss**	**Vanderbilt**	Dudley Field • Nashville, TN	**VAN** 9–2		

==== Week Seven ====
Date	Visiting team	Home team	Site	Result	Attendance	Reference
October 31	**Tennessee**	**Mississippi A&M**	Hardy Field • Starkville, MS	**MSA&M** 48–0		
November 1	**Sewanee**	University of Memphis	Red Elm Park • Memphis, TN	**W** 6–0		
November 3	**Clemson**	South Carolina	Fairgrounds • Columbia, SC	**W** 24–0		
November 5	**Auburn**	**Georgia Tech**	Ponce de Leon Park • Atlanta, GA	**AUB** 16–0		
November 5	Chattanooga	**Mercer**	Central City Park • Macon, GA	**L** 0–6		
November 5	**The Citadel**	Florida	Jacksonville, FL	**L** 2–6		
November 5	Kentucky State College	**Tennessee**	Waite Field • Knoxville, TN	**L** 0–10		
November 5	**Alabama**	**Ole Miss**	Greenville, MS	**MISS** 16–0		
November 5	**Mississippi A&M**	Tulane	Tulane Stadium • New Orleans, LA	**W** 10–0		
November 5	**Georgia**	**Sewanee**	Hardee Field • Sewanee, TN	**SEW** 15–12		
November 5	**LSU**	**Vanderbilt**	Dudley Field • Nashville, TN	**VAN** 22–0		
November 5	**Howard (AL)**	Disque High School	Elliott Park • Gadsden, AL	**L** 0–14		

==== Week Eight ====
Date	Visiting team	Home team	Site	Result	Attendance	Reference
November 10	**Clemson**	**Georgia**	Augusta, GA	**T** 0–0		
November 12	**Auburn**	Tulane	Harrison County Fairgrounds • Gulfport, MS	**W** 33–0		
November 12	**Howard (AL)**	Chattanooga	Chamberlain Field • Chattanooga, TN	**L** 0–56		
November 12	**Ole Miss**	University of Memphis	Red Elm Park • Memphis, TN	**W** 44–0		
November 12	Birmingham	**Mississippi A&M**	Hardy Field • Starkville, MS	**W** 46–0		
November 12	**Sewanee**	**Alabama**	Alabama State Fairgrounds • Birmingham, AL	**SEW** 30–0		
November 12	Maryville (TN)	**Tennessee**	Waite Field • Knoxville, TN	**W** 13–0		
November 12	**Vanderbilt**	**Georgia Tech**	Ponce de Leon Park • Atlanta, GA	**VAN** 23–0		

==== Week Nine ====
Date	Visiting team	Home team	Site	Result	Attendance	Reference
November 18	**Mercer**	**The Citadel**	Savannah, GA	**MER** 21–0		
November 18	**Howard (AL)**	**Mississippi A&M**	Hardy Field • Starkville, MS	**MSA&M** 82–0		
November 19	**Alabama**	Tulane	Tulane Stadium • New Orleans, LA	**W** 5–3		
November 19	Chattanooga	**Tennessee**	Waite Field • Knoxville, TN	**T** 6–6		
November 19	**Georgia**	**Georgia Tech**	Ponce de Leon Park • Atlanta, GA	**UGA** 11–6		
November 19	**LSU**	Texas	Clark Field • Austin, TX	**L** 0–12		

==== Week Ten ====
Date	Visiting team	Home team	Site	Result	Attendance	Reference
November 24	Washington and Lee	**Alabama**	Alabama State Fairgrounds • Birmingham, AL	**W** 9–0		
November 24	**LSU**	Arkansas	West End Park • Little Rock, AR	**L** 0–51		
November 24	**Auburn**	**Georgia**	Savannah, GA	**AUB** 26–0		
November 24	South Carolina	**The Citadel**	College Park Stadium • Charleston, SC	**W** 5–0		
November 24	**Clemson**	**Georgia Tech**	Ponce de Leon Park • Atlanta, GA	**GT** 34–0		
November 24	**Howard (AL)**	**Mercer**	Central City Park • Macon, GA	**MER** 28–0		
November 24	**Ole Miss**	**Mississippi A&M**	Mississippi State Fairgrounds • Jackson, MS	**MISS** 30–0		
November 24	**Sewanee**	**Vanderbilt**	Dudley Field • Nashville, TN	**VAN** 23–6	10,000	

==== Week Eleven ====
Date	Visiting team	Home team	Site	Result	Attendance	Reference
December 3	Charleston Navy	**The Citadel**	College Park Stadium • Charleston, SC	**W** 10–0		

== Awards and honors ==
=== All-Americans ===
- G - W. E. Metzger, Vanderbilt (WC-3)

=== All-Southern team ===
The composite All-Southern team of four sporting writers and three coaches included:

Position	Name	First-team selectors	Team
QB	Chigger Browne	C	Sewanee
HB	Ray Morrison	C	Vanderbilt
HB	Aubrey Lanier	C	Sewanee
FB	Bradley Streit	C	Auburn
E	Jenks Gillem	C	Sewanee
T	Ewing Y. Freeland	C	Vanderbilt
G	Will Metzger	C	Vanderbilt
C	Eugene Caton	C	Auburn
G	Earl Kinnebrew	C	Mississippi
T	Pat Patterson	C	Georgia Tech
E	Bill Neely	C	Vanderbilt

== See also ==
- 1910 Vanderbilt vs. Yale football game
