= Ole Miss–Vanderbilt football rivalry =

American college football rivalry

Khaki Bowl
- Ole Miss Rebels Vanderbilt Commodores
- First meeting: November 10, 1894; Vanderbilt 40, Ole Miss 0
- Latest meeting: October 10, 2026; Ole Miss 52, Vanderbilt 17
- Next meeting: 2028

Statistics
- Total meetings: 99
- All-time series: Ole Miss leads, 55–40–2
- Largest victory: Vanderbilt, 91–0 (1915)
- Longest win streak: Vanderbilt, 19 (1894–1938)
- Current win streak: Ole Miss, 6 (2019–present)

Locations of Ole Miss and Vanderbilt.

The Ole Miss–Vanderbilt football rivalry, also known as the Khaki Bowl, is an American college football rivalry between the Ole Miss Rebels football team of the University of Mississippi and Vanderbilt Commodores football team of Vanderbilt University.

== Notable games ==
=== 1894: First game ===
The 1894 Vanderbilt Commodores won the first game in the rivalry, 40–0. The game was cut short due to darkness.

=== 1900: Vanderbilt wins in the rain ===
The SIAA champion Vanderbilt team beat Ole Miss in the rain to open the season, 6–0, with a touchdown scored by George McLean. Ole Miss fumbled on Vanderbilt's 10-yard line, recovered by Walter H. Simmons.

=== 1903: Bob Blake stars ===
In 1903, Vanderbilt beat Ole Miss 33–0. Vanderbilt was led by Rhodes Scholars John Tigert and Bob Blake, and Blake ran for touchdowns of 75, 60, and 30 yards.

=== 1904: McGugin's first season ===
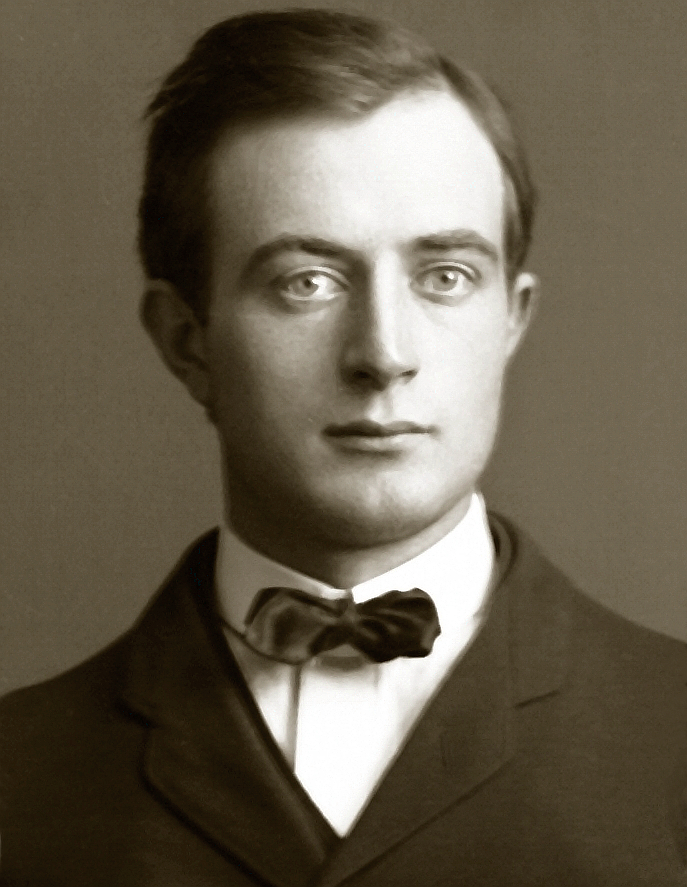
Dan McGugin

Vanderbilt Hall of Fame coach Dan McGugin is the first and only coach to win the first three games he coached by 60+ points. The third game for 1904 SIAA champion Vanderbilt was against Ole Miss, 69–0. "Ole Miss was buried under a stack of twelve touchdowns." According to Fuzzy Woodruff, "The whole South read that 69–0 score and gasped."

=== 1906: Easy win, McGugin's first onside kick ===
Vanderbilt's SIAA champion 1906 team was one of the early south's greatest, beating Ole Miss 29–0, which was held to −6 yards. The game included McGugin's first onside kick.

=== 1910: Vanderbilt keeps it close to the vest ===
SIAA champion Vanderbilt was set to play rival Georgia Tech in two weeks, and Tech coach John Heisman was a field judge for the Vanderbilt-Ole Miss game. So Vanderbilt was reluctant to show much, and won 9–2 thanks to a 90-yard punt return touchdown by Ray Morrison. The first points in the rivalry for Ole Miss were a safety when Bill Neely mishandled a punt and booted it out of the endzone.

=== 1911: Vandy decisively beats good Ole Miss team for SIAA title ===
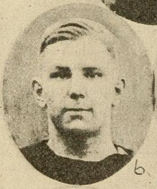
Lew Hardage

The 1911 Ole Miss team was one of the school's best early teams, but lost 21–0 to Vanderbilt, which thus clinched an SIAA championship. "This was easily the greatest southern game of the season".

In the second quarter, a long trick pass was caught by Ammie Sikes, who ran to Ole Miss's 5-yard line. Ray Morrison then got the score. Later, starting deep in his own territory, Morrison had a 70-yard run on a fake punt, going out of bounds at the 30-yard line. On the next play, Lew Hardage started around left end, then reversed right, and was again crowded out, reversing field back around left end. He seemed to break a tackle by every Ole Miss player. Zach Curlin also made an 18-yard drop kick.

=== 1915: Green apples fuel Commodores biggest win ===
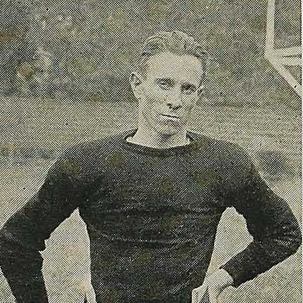
Rabbit Curry

The "point-a-minute" SIAA champion 1915 Vanderbilt Commodores defeated Ole Miss 91–0, the largest margin of victory in the history of the rivalry. Vanderbilt's train on the way to the game was halted near Dickson by a wreck ahead of it, and the players complained about the lack of food on the train. The team's manager James Stahlman foraged through neighboring orchards near the tracks and picked three or four hatfuls of green apples. Rabbit Curry ate several of them, and proceeded to score six touchdowns and kick eight extra points against Ole Miss.

=== 1925: One of the rivalry's toughest games ===
In 1925, Vanderbilt won 7–0 in a muddy game. Gil Reese scored the touchdown, and Kitty Creson's punting proved the difference.

=== 1939: Ole Miss's first victory ===
Ole Miss defeated Vanderbilt 14–7 in 1939, securing its first victory in the history of the rivalry. Vanderbilt won the first 19 meetings against Ole Miss and 16 by shutout, holding the Rebels to a total of 16 points.

=== 1947: Both teams ranked ===
In 1947, #10 Vanderbilt faced #18 Ole Miss, and won 10–6.

=== 1961: Ole Miss wins in a blowout ===
Ole Miss dominated the rivalry from 1953 to 1990. Their biggest margin of victory was 47–0 in 1961.

=== 1974: Vanderbilt's first defeat of Ole Miss at home since 1950 ===
The 1974 Vanderbilt Commodores defeated Ole Miss 24–14, the first win over Ole Miss at Dudley Field since 1950.

=== 1990: Ole Miss edges Vanderbilt ===
Ole Miss missed two field goals and beat Vanderbilt in a close game by only one point, 14–13.

=== 1991: Vanderbilt wins with a field goal ===
In 1991, Vanderbilt won 30–27 when Jeff Owen hit a 42-yard field goal with 22 seconds left, set up by an interception off Ole Miss quarterback Tom Luke.

=== 1999: Vanderbilt wins in overtime ===
The 1999 Vanderbilt Commodores beat Ole Miss 37–34 when Greg Zolman hit Elliott Carson for an 8-yard touchdown pass in overtime.

=== 2004: Ole Miss field goal in overtime ===
After trailing Jay Cutler and Vanderbilt 23–10, Ole Miss led a comeback, winning 26–23 with a field goal in overtime.

=== 2012: Jordan Rodgers leads comeback ===
The 2012 Vanderbilt Commodores trailed 23–6 early in the third quarter, but quarterback Jordan Rodgers led a comeback, culminating in a 26-yard touchdown pass with 52 seconds remaining for a 27–26 victory.

=== 2013: Ole Miss comeback in season opener ===
Ole Miss led a comeback on opening night to defeat Vanderbilt 39–35. Running back Jeff Scott broke a long run for a touchdown with a minute left in the game.

=== 2018: Vanderbilt wins in overtime ===
Kyle Shurmer threw a 5-yard touchdown pass to Kalija Lipscomb to beat Ole Miss in overtime 36–29.

== Game results ==
Ole Miss victories	Vanderbilt victories	Tie games	Vacated wins

No.	Date	Location	Winner	Score
1	November 11, 1894	Nashville, TN	Vanderbilt	40–0
2	November 4, 1899	Memphis, TN	Vanderbilt	11–0
3	October 6, 1900	Nashville, TN	Vanderbilt	6–0
4	October 11, 1902	Nashville, TN	Vanderbilt	29–0
5	October 24, 1903	Nashville, TN	Vanderbilt	33–0
6	October 15, 1904	Nashville, TN	Vanderbilt	69–0
7	October 13, 1906	Nashville, TN	Vanderbilt	29–0
8	November 9, 1907	Nashville, TN	Vanderbilt	60–0
9	October 24, 1908	Nashville, TN	Vanderbilt	29–0
10	October 30, 1909	Nashville, TN	Vanderbilt	17–0
11	October 29, 1910	Nashville, TN	Vanderbilt	9–2
12	November 18, 1911	Nashville, TN	Vanderbilt	21–0
13	October 26, 1912	Nashville, TN	Vanderbilt	24–0
14	October 23, 1915	Memphis, TN	Vanderbilt	91–0
15	October 21, 1916	Nashville, TN	Vanderbilt	35–0
16	October 31, 1925	Nashville, TN	Vanderbilt	7–0
17	September 28, 1929	Nashville, TN	Vanderbilt	19–7
18	November 1, 1930	Nashville, TN	Vanderbilt	24–0
19	October 15, 1938	Nashville, TN	Vanderbilt	13–7
20	November 4, 1939	Memphis, TN	Ole Miss	14–7
21	November 2, 1940	Nashville, TN	Ole Miss	13–7
22	November 7, 1942	Memphis, TN	Vanderbilt	19–0
23	October 6, 1945	Nashville, TN	Ole Miss	14–7
24	October 5, 1946	Memphis, TN	Vanderbilt	7–0
25	October 11, 1947	Nashville, TN	#10 Vanderbilt	10–6
26	October 9, 1948	Oxford, MS	#13 Ole Miss	20–7
27	October 8, 1949	Nashville, TN	Vanderbilt	28–27
28	October 14, 1950	Nashville, TN	#19 Vanderbilt	20–14
29	October 13, 1951	Memphis, TN	Vanderbilt	34–20
30	October 11, 1952	Nashville, TN	Tie	21–21
31	October 10, 1953	Oxford, MS	Ole Miss	28–6
32	October 9, 1954	Nashville, TN	#7 Ole Miss	22–7
33	October 8, 1955	Memphis, TN	Ole Miss	13–0
34	October 13, 1956	Oxford, MS	#7 Ole Miss	16–0
35	October 12, 1957	Nashville, TN	#14 Ole Miss	28–0
36	October 10, 1959	Nashville, TN	#5 Ole Miss	33–0
37	October 8, 1960	Nashville, TN	#2 Ole Miss	26–0
38	October 28, 1961	Oxford, MS	#2 Ole Miss	47–0
39	October 27, 1962	Memphis, TN	#7 Ole Miss	35–0
40	October 26, 1963	Oxford, MS	#5 Ole Miss	27–7
41	October 24, 1964	Nashville, TN	Tie	7–7
42	October 23, 1965	Oxford, MS	Ole Miss	24–7
43	November 19, 1966	Jackson, MS	Ole Miss	34–0
44	November 25, 1967	Nashville, TN	Ole Miss	28–7
45	October 24, 1970	Nashville, TN	#13 Ole Miss	26–16
46	October 23, 1971	Oxford, MS	Ole Miss	28–7
47	October 28, 1972	Nashville, TN	Ole Miss	31–7
48	October 27, 1973	Oxford, MS	Ole Miss	24–14
49	October 26, 1974	Nashville, TN	Vanderbilt	24–14
50	October 25, 1975	Oxford, MS	Ole Miss	17–7
51	October 23, 1976	Nashville, TN	Ole Miss	20–3

No.	Date	Location	Winner	Score
52	October 22, 1977	Oxford, MS	Ole Miss	26–14
53	October 28, 1978	Nashville, TN	Ole Miss	35–10
54	October 27, 1979	Oxford, MS	Ole Miss	63–28
55	October 25, 1980	Nashville, TN	Ole Miss	27–14
56	October 24, 1981	Oxford, MS	Vanderbilt	27–23
57	October 23, 1982	Nashville, TN	Vanderbilt	19–10
58	October 22, 1983	Oxford, MS	Ole Miss	21–14
59	October 27, 1984	Nashville, TN	Vanderbilt	37–20
60	October 26, 1985	Oxford, MS	Ole Miss	35–7
61	October 25, 1986	Nashville, TN	Ole Miss	28–12
62	October 24, 1987	Oxford, MS	Ole Miss	42–14
63	October 22, 1988	Nashville, TN	Ole Miss	36–28
64	October 28, 1989	Oxford, MS	Ole Miss	24–16
65	October 27, 1990	Nashville, TN	#17 Ole Miss	14–13
66	October 26, 1991	Oxford, MS	Vanderbilt	30–27
67	September 19, 1992	Nashville, TN	Vanderbilt	31–9
68	September 18, 1993	Oxford, MS	Ole Miss	49–7
69	September 17, 1994	Nashville, TN	Ole Miss	20–14
70	October 28, 1995	Oxford, MS	Ole Miss	21–10
71	September 21, 1996	Nashville, TN	Ole Miss	20–9
72	September 27, 1997	Oxford, MS	Ole Miss	15–3
73	September 19, 1998	Nashville, TN	Ole Miss	30–6
74	September 18, 1999	Oxford, MS	Vanderbilt	37–34
75	September 16, 2000	Nashville, TN	Ole Miss	12–7
76	December 1, 2001	Oxford, MS	Ole Miss	38–27
77	September 21, 2002	Oxford, MS	Ole Miss	45–38
78	August 30, 2003	Nashville, TN	Ole Miss	24–21
79	September 18, 2004	Oxford, MS	Ole Miss	26–23
80	September 17, 2005	Nashville, TN	Vanderbilt	31–23
81	October 7, 2006	Oxford, MS	Ole Miss	17–10
82	September 15, 2007	Nashville, TN	Vanderbilt	31–17
83	September 20, 2008	Oxford, MS	Vanderbilt	23–17
84	October 3, 2009	Nashville, TN	#21 Ole Miss	23–7
85	September 18, 2010	Oxford, MS	Vanderbilt	28–14
86	September 17, 2011	Nashville, TN	Vanderbilt	30–7
87	November 10, 2012	Oxford, MS	Vanderbilt	27–26
88	August 29, 2013	Nashville, TN	Ole Miss†	39–35
89	September 6, 2014‡	Nashville, TN	#15 Ole Miss†	41–3
90	September 26, 2015	Oxford, MS	#3 Ole Miss	27–16
91	November 19, 2016	Nashville, TN	Vanderbilt	38–17
92	October 14, 2017	Oxford, MS	Ole Miss	57–35
93	November 17, 2018	Nashville, TN	Vanderbilt	36–29^{OT}
94	October 5, 2019	Oxford, MS	Ole Miss	31–6
95	October 31, 2020	Nashville, TN	Ole Miss	54–21
96	November 20, 2021	Oxford, MS	#12 Ole Miss	31–17
97	October 8, 2022	Nashville, TN	#9 Ole Miss	52–28
98	October 28, 2023	Oxford, MS	#12 Ole Miss	33–7
99	October 10, 2026	Nashville, TN	#9 Ole Miss	52–17
Series: Ole Miss leads 55–40–2
† Ole Miss vacated as part of NCAA penalties ‡ Game played at LP Field

== See also ==
- List of NCAA college football rivalry games
