= 1910 Howard Baptists football team =

American college football season

1910 Howard Baptists football
- Conference: Southern Intercollegiate Athletic Association
- Record: 1–8 (0–5 SIAA)
- Head coach: James C. Donnelly (1st season)
- Home stadium: West End Park; Alabama State Fairgrounds

1910 Southern Intercollegiate Athletic Association football standings
	Conf.					Overall
Team	W		L		T	W		L		T
Vanderbilt +	5	–	0	–	0	8	–	0	–	1
Auburn +	5	–	0	–	0	6	–	1	–	0
Sewanee	3	–	1	–	0	8	–	2	–	0
Georgia	4	–	2	–	1	6	–	2	–	1
Ole Miss	2	–	1	–	0	7	–	1	–	0
Mississippi A&M	3	–	2	–	0	7	–	2	–	0
Mercer	3	–	2	–	0	6	–	3	–	0
Georgia Tech	3	–	3	–	0	5	–	3	–	0
Clemson	2	–	3	–	1	4	–	3	–	1
LSU	1	–	3	–	0	1	–	5	–	0
Tennessee	1	–	4	–	0	3	–	5	–	1
The Citadel	0	–	2	–	0	3	–	4	–	0
Alabama	0	–	4	–	0	4	–	4	–	0
Howard (AL)	0	–	5	–	0	1	–	8	–	0
+ – Conference co-champions

The 1910 Howard Baptists football team was an American football team that represented Howard College (now known as the Samford University) as a member of the Southern Intercollegiate Athletic Association (SIAA) during the 1910 college football season. In their first year under head coach James C. Donnelly, the team compiled a 1–8 record.

== Schedule ==
Date	Time	Opponent	Site	Result	Source
October 1	3:30 p.m.	Blountsville Agricultural*	West End Park; Birmingham, AL	W 10–0	
October 8		Clemson	Alabama State Fairgrounds; Birmingham, AL	L 0–24	
October 14		Auburn	West End Park; Birmingham, AL	L 0–78	
October 22		vs. Southern (AL)*	Vandiver Park; Montgomery, AL	L 0–5	
October 29		Tennessee	Alabama State Fairgrounds; Birmingham, AL	L 0–17	
November 5		at Disque High School*	Elliott Park; Gadsden, AL	L 0–14	
November 12		at Chattanooga*	Chamberlain Field; Chattanooga, TN	L 0–56	
November 18		at Mississippi A&M	Hardy Field; Starkville, MS	L 0–82	
November 24		at Mercer	Central City Park; Macon, GA	L 0–28	
*Non-conference game
