= 1910 Mercer Baptists football team =

American college football season

1910 Mercer Baptists football
- Conference: Southern Intercollegiate Athletic Association
- Record: 6–3 (3–2 SIAA)
- Head coach: Charles C. Stroud (1st season)
- Home stadium: Central City Park

1910 Southern Intercollegiate Athletic Association football standings
	Conf.					Overall
Team	W		L		T	W		L		T
Vanderbilt +	5	–	0	–	0	8	–	0	–	1
Auburn +	5	–	0	–	0	6	–	1	–	0
Sewanee	3	–	1	–	0	8	–	2	–	0
Georgia	4	–	2	–	1	6	–	2	–	1
Ole Miss	2	–	1	–	0	7	–	1	–	0
Mississippi A&M	3	–	2	–	0	7	–	2	–	0
Mercer	3	–	2	–	0	6	–	3	–	0
Georgia Tech	3	–	3	–	0	5	–	3	–	0
Clemson	2	–	3	–	1	4	–	3	–	1
LSU	1	–	3	–	0	1	–	5	–	0
Tennessee	1	–	4	–	0	3	–	5	–	1
The Citadel	0	–	2	–	0	3	–	4	–	0
Alabama	0	–	4	–	0	4	–	4	–	0
Howard (AL)	0	–	5	–	0	1	–	8	–	0
+ – Conference co-champions

The 1910 Mercer Baptists football team was an American football team that represented Mercer University as a member of the Southern Intercollegiate Athletic Association (SIAA) during the 1910 college football season. In their first year under head coach Charles C. Stroud, the team compiled an 6–3 record, with a mark of 3–2 in the SIAA.

== Schedule ==
Date	Opponent	Site	Result	Source
September 24	Locust Grove Institute*	Central City Park; Macon, GA	W 32–0	
October 1	at Clemson	Bowman Field; Calhoun, SC	W 3–0	
October 8	Georgia Medical*	Central City Park; Macon, GA	W 22–0	
October 15	at Georgia Tech	Ponce de Leon Park; Atlanta, GA	L 0–46	
October 22	Florida*	Central City Park; Macon, GA	W 13–0	
October 29	at Georgia	Herty Field; Athens, GA	L 0–21	
November 5	Chattanooga*	Central City Park; Macon, GA	L 0–6	
November 18	vs. The Citadel	Savannah, GA	W 21–0	
November 24	Howard (AL)	Central City Park; Macon, GA	W 28–0	
*Non-conference game
