= 1910 Vanderbilt Commodores football team =

American college football season

1910 Vanderbilt Commodores football

SIAA co-champion
- Conference: Southern Intercollegiate Athletic Association
- Record: 8–0–1 (5–0 SIAA)
- Head coach: Dan McGugin (7th season)
- Offensive scheme: Short punt
- Captain: Bill Neely
- Home stadium: Dudley Field

1910 Southern Intercollegiate Athletic Association football standings
	Conf.					Overall
Team	W		L		T	W		L		T
Vanderbilt +	5	–	0	–	0	8	–	0	–	1
Auburn +	5	–	0	–	0	6	–	1	–	0
Sewanee	3	–	1	–	0	8	–	2	–	0
Georgia	4	–	2	–	1	6	–	2	–	1
Ole Miss	2	–	1	–	0	7	–	1	–	0
Mississippi A&M	3	–	2	–	0	7	–	2	–	0
Mercer	3	–	2	–	0	6	–	3	–	0
Georgia Tech	3	–	3	–	0	5	–	3	–	0
Clemson	2	–	3	–	1	4	–	3	–	1
LSU	1	–	3	–	0	1	–	5	–	0
Tennessee	1	–	4	–	0	3	–	5	–	1
The Citadel	0	–	2	–	0	3	–	4	–	0
Alabama	0	–	4	–	0	4	–	4	–	0
Howard (AL)	0	–	5	–	0	1	–	8	–	0
+ – Conference co-champions

The 1910 Vanderbilt Commodores football team represented Vanderbilt University in the sport of American football during 1910 college football season. In Dan McGugin's 7th year as head coach, the Commodores as members of the Southern Intercollegiate Athletic Association (SIAA) compiled an 8–0–1 record (5–0 SIAA) and outscored their opponents 165 to 8, winning a conference championship.

The only blemish on Vanderbilt's record was a scoreless tie with defending national champion Yale, the first time Yale had been held scoreless at home, and the South's first great showing against an Eastern power. James Howell's computer rating system retroactively named Vanderbilt a national champion.

The team was led by lineman Will Metzger, and piloted in the backfield by quarterback Ray Morrison. Metzger was selected third-team All-American by Walter Camp, the third player from the South ever to receive such and honor.

== Schedule ==
Date	Opponent	Site	Result	Attendance	Source
October 1	Mooney School*	Dudley Field; Nashville, TN	W 34–0	1,500	
October 8	Rose Polytechnic*	Dudley Field; Nashville, TN	W 23–0	3,500	
October 12	Castle Heights*	Dudley Field; Nashville, TN	W 14–0		
October 15	Tennessee	Dudley Field; Nashville, TN (rivalry)	W 18–0		
October 22	at Yale*	Yale Field; New Haven, CT	T 0–0		
October 29	Ole Miss	Dudley Field; Nashville, TN (rivalry)	W 9–2		
November 5	LSU	Dudley Field; Nashville, TN	W 22–0		
November 12	at Georgia Tech	Tech Flats; Atlanta, GA (rivalry)	W 22–0		
November 24	Sewanee	Dudley Field; Nashville, TN (rivalry)	W 23–6	10,000	
*Non-conference game

== Before the season ==
Former Vanderbilt player Bob Blake received a law degree and returned to Vanderbilt for one season as an assistant for head coach Dan McGugin. The team's captain was Bill Neely, the older brother of Jess Neely. Newcomers on the line were the Brown brothers from Gallatin, guard Charles and tackle Tom.

In 1910, football used a one-platoon system, with players featuring on both offense, defense, and special teams. Also, the field was 110 yards in length, touchdowns were 5 points, and field goals earned 4 points. The team that scored a touchdown had the option to kickoff or receive.

== Game summaries ==
=== Mooney ===
Vanderbilt opened the season on September 24 with a defeat of Mooney School 34–0. (Note: Mooney School was a preparatory school for boys in Murfreesboro. It was named for William Drumgoole Mooney, the first headmaster of Battle Ground Academy in Franklin.) Ray Morrison and Bill Neely starred in the backfield. Despite the excessive heat, newcomers Kent Morrison, Enoch Brown, and Hugh Morgan played well.

The starting lineup was E. Brown (left end), Stegall (left tackle), Metzger (left guard), Morgan (center), Ridgeway (right guard), Freeland (right tackle), Covington (right end), Morrison (quarterback), Neely (left halfback), Williams (right halfback), Robbins (fullback).

=== Rose Polytechnic ===
Vanderbilt won over Rose Polytechnic, 23–0. Morrison and Neely again starred in the swift backfield. Ted Ross re-injured his knee. Taking Ross's place in the line was Tom Brown.

The starting lineup was E. Brown (left end), Freeland (left tackle), Metzger (left guard), Morgan (center), Ross (right guard), Brown (right tackle), Stewart (right end), Morrison (quarterback), K. Morrison (left halfback), Neely (right halfback), Williams (fullback).

=== Castle Heights ===
In the third week of play, the Commodores beat Castle Heights Military Academy 14–0. The contest was billed as practice for the upcoming game with Tennessee. The low score was a bit of a let down.

=== Tennessee ===
Tennessee at Vanderbilt

Team	1	2	3	4	Total
Tennessee	0	0	0	0	0
• Vanderbilt	0	6	6	6	18

- Date: October 15
- Location: Curry Field
  Nashville, Tennessee
- Referee: Bradley Walker

Vanderbilt then won a tough match 18–0 over the Tennessee Volunteers. After a blocked punt, Vanderbilt's Bo Williams went across for the game's first touchdown. The second score came when Neely went around right-end for 15 yards and a touchdown. Neely had another touchdown in the fourth quarter, running 25 yards. Several fights between players nearly broke out during the game.

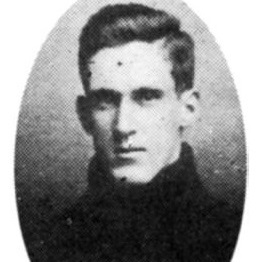
Captain Neely

The starting lineup was Anderson (left end), T. Brown (left tackle), Metzger (left guard), Morgan (center), Steagal (right guard), Freeland (right tackle), E. Brown (right end), Robins (quarterback), K. Morrison (left halfback), Neely (right halfback), Williams (fullback).

=== Yale ===
Vanderbilt at Yale

Team	1	2	3	4	Total
Vanderbilt	0	0	0	0	0
Yale	0	0	0	0	0

- Date: October 22
- Location: Yale Field
  New Haven, Connecticut
- Referee: Dave Fultz

October 22 brought the highlight of the year: a scoreless tie with the defending national champion, coach Ted Coy's Yale Bulldogs. It was the first time Yale had been held scoreless at home, and the south's first great showing against an Eastern power.

The game was played in a pouring rain. One account reads "Four times brilliant rushes around end by Capt. Neely brought the ball well into Yale territory, only to be lost because of penalties against the visitors. Vanderbilt did not substitute a single player."

Neely, recalling the game said "The score tells the story a good deal better than I can. All I want to say is that I never saw a football team fight any harder at every point that Vanderbilt fought today – line, ends, and backfield. We went in to give Yale the best we had and I think we about did it."

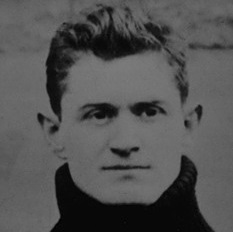
Ray Morrison

The starting lineup was Stewart (left end), Freeland (left tackle), F. Brown (left guard), Morgan (center), Metzger (right guard), Noel (right tackle), E. Brown (right end), R. Morrison (quarterback), Neely (left halfback), . Morrison (right halfback), Williams (fullback).

=== Mississippi ===
Mississippi at Vanderbilt

Team	1	2	3	4	Total
Miss.	2	0	0	0	2
• Vanderbilt	6	3	0	0	9

- Date: October 29
- Location: Dudley Field
  Nashville, Tennessee
- Referee: Grantland Rice

Vanderbilt won a close game over Mississippi 9–2. Late in the first quarter, Ray Morrison ran 90 yards for Vanderbilt's touchdown on a punt return. On the ensuing drive, Neely set up to punt, and the ball got away from him. Attempting to recover it, he booted the ball behind his own goal line, netting a safety for Mississippi. Neely later made a 22-yard field goal. John Heisman was field judge, and McGugin did not want to show too much, playing Heisman's Georgia Tech in two weeks.

The starting lineup was Stewart (left end), T. Brown (left tackle), Brown (left guard), Morgan (center), Metzger (right guard), Freeland (right tackle), E. Brown (right end), Morrison (quarterback), Neely (left halfback), K. Morrison (right halfback), Williams (fullback).

=== Louisiana State ===
Louisiana State at Vanderbilt

Team	1	2	3	4	Total
LSU	0	0	0	0	0
• Vanderbilt	11	6	5	0	22

- Date: November 5
- Location: Dudley Field
  Nashville, Tennessee
- Referee: Bradley Walker

The Commodores overwhelmed the Louisiana State Tigers 22–0. Vanderbilt's first score came on a 12-yard Kent Morrison run. He also scored the second touchdown. Neely made the third score, and the last was from an Enoch Brown run of 60 yards. Subs were sent in by game's end.

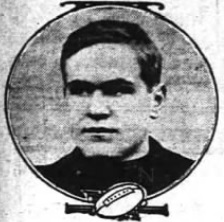
Enoch Brown

The starting lineup was Stewart (left end), T. Brown (left tackle), Brown (left guard), Morgan (center), Metzger (right guard), Freeland (right tackle), E. Brown (right end), Morrison (quarterback), Neely (left halfback), K. Morrison (right halfback), Martin (fullback).

=== Georgia Tech ===
Vanderbilt at Georgia Tech

Team	1	2	3	4	Total
• Vanderbilt	0	0	11	11	22
Ga. Tech	0	0	0	0	0

- Date: November 12
- Location: Tech Flats
  Atlanta
- Referee: Bradley Walker

Vanderbilt beat Heisman's Georgia Tech 22–0. Sewanee's coach Harris Cope was at the game, and again McGugin took to conventional football, resulting in a scoreless first half.

The first score came on a pass from Bill Neely to Enoch Brown. Two minutes later, Ray Morrison got away for another touchdown, and the game opened up from there. Morrison was considered the game's star. After an illegal forward pass, Vanderbilt had another touchdown (Bradley Walker's officiating drew criticism throughout). The last score came after a 25-yard run from Neely and was scored by a dodging Morrison.

The starting lineup was Stewart (left end), Freeland (left tackle), Metzger (left guard), Morgan (center), Stegall (right guard), T. Brown (right tackle), E. Brown (right end), Morrison (quarterback), K. Morrison (left halfback), Neely (right halfback), Williams (fullback).

=== Sewanee ===
The Commodores defeated the Sewanee Tigers 23–6. By the second quarter, Sewanee's defense was "completely dismantled" by Vanderbilt's rushing attack. Sewanee had one first down all game – an 85-yard run by Aubrey Lanier.

The starting lineup was Stewart (left end), T. Brown (left tackle), Stegall (left guard), Morgan (center), Metzger (right guard), Freeland (right tackle), E. Brown (right end), Morrison (quarterback), K. Morrison (left halfback), Neely (right halfback), Williams (fullback).

== After the season ==
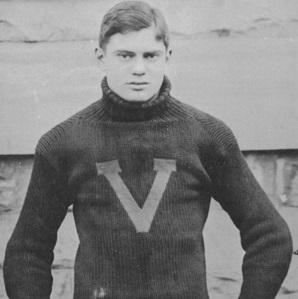
Will Metzger

Morrison, Metzger, Freeland, and Neely made composite All-Southern. Metzger was selected third-team All-American by Walter Camp, the third player from the South ever to receive such an honor.

=== Legacy ===
Both Metzger and Morrison were selected for an Associated Press Southeast Area All-Time football team 1869–1919 era.

== Personnel ==
=== Depth chart ===
The following chart provides a visual depiction of Vanderbilt's lineup during the 1910 season with games started at the position reflected in parentheses. The chart mimics a short punt formation while on offense, with the quarterback under center.

LE
Slick Stewart (5)
Enoch Brown (2)
Anderson (1)

LT	LG	C	RG	RT
Tom Brown (4)	Will Metzger (4)	Hugh Morgan (8)	Will Metzger (4)	Ewing Y. Freeland (5)
Ewing Y. Freeland (3)	Charles H. Brown (3)		Steagall (2)	Tom Brown (2)
Steagall (1)	Steagall (1)		Ridgeway (1)	Oscar Noel (1)
			Ted Ross (1)	

RE
Enoch Brown (6)
Covington (1)
Slick Stewart (1)
Oscar Noel (0)

QB
Ray Morrison (7)
Rabbi Robins (1)

LHB	RHB
Kent Morrison (4)	Bill Neely (4)
Bill Neely (4)	Kent Morrison (3)
	Bo Williams (1)

FB
Henry "Bo" Williams (6)
Martin (1)
Rabbi Robins (1)

-

== Bibliography ==
- Vanderbilt University (1910). Vanderbilt University Quarterly. Vol. 10.
