= 1910 Alabama Crimson Tide football team =

American college football season

1910 Alabama Crimson Tide football
- Conference: Southern Intercollegiate Athletic Association
- Record: 4–4 (0–4 SIAA)
- Head coach: Guy Lowman (1st season)
- Captain: O. G. Gresham
- Home stadium: The Quad; Birmingham Fairgrounds

1910 Southern Intercollegiate Athletic Association football standings
	Conf.					Overall
Team	W		L		T	W		L		T
Vanderbilt +	5	–	0	–	0	8	–	0	–	1
Auburn +	5	–	0	–	0	6	–	1	–	0
Sewanee	3	–	1	–	0	8	–	2	–	0
Georgia	4	–	2	–	1	6	–	2	–	1
Ole Miss	2	–	1	–	0	7	–	1	–	0
Mississippi A&M	3	–	2	–	0	7	–	2	–	0
Mercer	3	–	2	–	0	6	–	3	–	0
Georgia Tech	3	–	3	–	0	5	–	3	–	0
Clemson	2	–	3	–	1	4	–	3	–	1
LSU	1	–	3	–	0	1	–	5	–	0
Tennessee	1	–	4	–	0	3	–	5	–	1
The Citadel	0	–	2	–	0	3	–	4	–	0
Alabama	0	–	4	–	0	4	–	4	–	0
Howard (AL)	0	–	5	–	0	1	–	8	–	0
+ – Conference co-champions

The 1910 Alabama Crimson Tide football team (variously "Alabama", "UA" or "Bama") represented the University of Alabama in the 1910 college football season. It was the Crimson Tide's 18th overall and 15th season as a member of the Southern Intercollegiate Athletic Association (SIAA). The team was led by head coach Guy Lowman, in his first year, and played their home games at the University of Alabama Quad in Tuscaloosa and the Birmingham Fairgrounds in Birmingham, Alabama. They finished the season with a record of four wins and four losses (4–4 overall, 0–4 in the SIAA).

After Alabama opened the season with shutouts over both Birmingham College and the Marion Military Institute, the Crimsons lost four consecutive games to SIAA opponents by a margin of 104–0. The squad rebounded with a 5–3 victory over Tulane at New Orleans and a 9–0 victory over Washington and Lee to finish the season with an overall record of 4–4.

== Schedule ==
Date	Opponent	Site	Result	Source
October 1	Birmingham*	The Quad; Tuscaloosa, AL	W 25–0	
October 8	Marion*	The Quad; Tuscaloosa, AL	W 26–0	
October 15	Georgia	Birmingham Fairgrounds; Birmingham, AL (rivalry)	L 0–22	
October 22	Georgia Tech	The Quad; Tuscaloosa, AL (rivalry)	L 0–36	
November 5	vs. Ole Miss	Greenville, MS (rivalry)	L 0–16	
November 12	Sewanee	Birmingham Fairgrounds; Birmingham, AL	L 0–30	
November 19	at Tulane*	First Tulane Stadium; New Orleans, LA	W 5–3	
November 24	Washington and Lee*	Birmingham Fairgrounds; Birmingham, AL	W 9–0	
*Non-conference game

(Note: For the 1910 season, point values were different from those used in contemporary games. In 1910 a touchdown was worth five points, a field goal was worth three points and an extra point (PAT) was worth one point.)

== Before the season ==
In March 1910, J. W. H. Pollard announced his resignation as head football coach and athletic director, and took the same positions at Washington and Lee University. After several months of searching for a replacement, in August the University's Committee on Athletics hired Guy Lowman from the University of Missouri to serve as both head football coach and athletic director. With his hiring, many expected him to successfully guide the football team through what was viewed as its toughest schedule in school history.

The team reported for its first practice on September 10, and at that time six players returned with at least one season of experience with he Crimson and White. At the start of practice, coach Lowman identified as the teams weakest positions being the linemen and backs.

== Game summaries ==
=== Birmingham ===
Team	1	2	Total
Birmingham College	0	0	0
• Alabama	22	3	25

- Date: October 1, 1910
- Location: The Quad • Tuscaloosa, Alabama

Alabama opened the season with this 25–0 victory over Birmingham College (now Birmingham–Southern College) at Tuscaloosa. After a scoreless first quarter where Birmingham unsuccessfully tries several trick plays, Alabama scored 22 second quarter points. After a safety, the Crimsons scored their first touchdown of the season on an Adrian Van de Graaff run to take a 7–0 lead. After a Lambert touchdown run, Van de Graaff scored his second touchdown of the game, and after a 20-yard Farley Moody field goal Alabama led 22–0 at halftime. A second half Moody field goal made the final score 25–0.

=== Marion ===
Team	1	2	Total
Marion Military Institute	0	0	0
• Alabama	0	26	26

- Date: October 8, 1910
- Location: The Quad • Tuscaloosa, Alabama

After a victory over Birmingham College to open the season, Alabama won its second game 26–0 against the Marion Military Institute at Tuscaloosa. In the game, Robert Bumgardner scored three touchdowns with Adrian Van de Graaff scoring the fourth on a 70-yard run in the victory.

=== Georgia ===
Team	1	2	Total
• Georgia	11	11	22
Alabama	0	0	0

- Date: October 15, 1910
- Location: Birmingham Fairgrounds • Birmingham, Alabama

Against the Georgia Bulldogs, Alabama lost its first game of the season 22–0 before 12,000 fans at Birmingham. After a scoreless first quarter, Georgia scored second-quarter touchdowns on runs by W. F. McClelland and Robert MacWhorter to take an 11–0 halftime lead. In the third quarter, the Bulldogs scored on a 25-yard MacWhorter run and in the fourth on a 75-yard J. F. Slater fumble returned for a touchdown to make the final score 22–0.

=== Georgia Tech ===
Team	1	2	Total
• Georgia Tech	24	12	36
Alabama	0	0	0

- Date: October 22, 1910
- Location: The Quad • Tuscaloosa, Alabama

Against the Georgia Tech Yellow Jackets, Alabama lost its second game of the season 36–0 at Tuscaloosa.

=== Ole Miss ===
Team	1	2	Total
Alabama	0	0	0
• Ole Miss	5	11	16

- Date: November 5, 1910
- Location: Greenville, Mississippi

Against the Ole Miss Rebels, Alabama suffered its third loss of the season 16–0 at Greenville. Fran Shields scored the only points of the first half on his touchdown run in the first quarter. In the second half, Alonzo Lee scored on an 11-yard run and Steve Mitchell scored on a 10-yard run in the fourth to give the Rebels the 16–0 victory.

=== Sewanee ===
Team	1	2	Total
• Sewanee	18	12	30
Alabama	0	0	0

- Date: November 12, 1910
- Location: Birmingham Fairgrounds • Birmingham, Alabama

Against the Sewanee Tigers, Alabama lost its fourth consecutive game 30–0 at Birmingham.

=== Tulane ===
Team	1	2	Total
• Alabama	2	3	5
Tulane	0	3	3

- Date: November 19, 1910
- Location: "First" Tulane Stadium • New Orleans, Louisiana

Against the Tulane Green Wave, Alabama ended their four-game losing streak after they defeated the Greenies 5–3 at New Orleans. Alabama led 2–0 at halftime with their only points coming on a first quarter safety, which occurred after a Tulane player tried to return a missed Alabama field goal. After Tulane took a 3–2 lead in the third, Farley Moody kicked a 20-yard, game-winning field goal for Alabama.

=== Washington and Lee ===
Team	1	2	Total
Washington and Lee	0	0	0
• Alabama	0	9	9

- Date: November 24, 1910
- Location: Birmingham Fairgrounds • Birmingham, Alabama

Against the Washington and Lee Generals, Alabama closed their season with a 9–0 victory at Birmingham. After a scoreless first half, Alabama took a 9–0 lead in the second half after three successful Farley Moody field goals. The victory also marked the return of former Alabama head coach J. W. H. Pollard, who resigned his position with the Crimsons to take the head coaching position with the Generals in the spring of 1910.

== Personnel ==
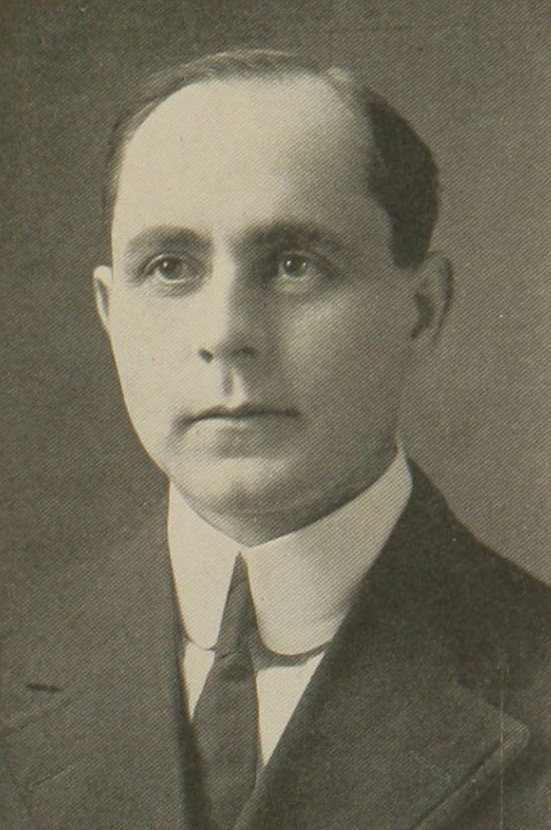
Head coach Guy Lowman entered his only year as Alabama's head coach for the 1910 season.

=== Varsity letter winners ===
Player	Hometown	Position
Robert H. Bumgardner	Bessemer, Alabama	End
Louis Malone Finlay	Pollard, Alabama	Tackle
Charles West Greer	Marion, Alabama	Back
Victor John Heard	Camp Hill, Alabama	Back
Vigil Willis Heard	Camp Hill, Alabama	Back
Thomas Manning	Talladega, Alabama	Center
William Hoadley Merrill	Eufaula, Alabama	Guard
Emory Bush Peebles	Vienna, Alabama	Quarterback
Harold Mustin Powell	Birmingham, Alabama	Tackle
James Alfred Scott	Thomasville, Alabama	End
Patrick Kyle Shirley	Wetumpka, Alabama	
Everett Wilkinson	Prattville, Alabama	Back/Kicker

=== Coaching staff ===
Name	Position	Seasons at Alabama	Alma mater
Guy Lowman	Head coach	1	Springfield (1905)
F. G. Stickney	Assistant coach	1	Alabama (1903)
