= 1910 Tennessee Volunteers football team =

American college football season

1910 Tennessee Volunteers football
- Conference: Southern Intercollegiate Athletic Association
- Record: 3–5–1 (1–4 SIAA)
- Head coach: Lex Stone (1st season)
- Captain: W. C. Johnson
- Home stadium: Waite Field

1910 Southern Intercollegiate Athletic Association football standings
	Conf.					Overall
Team	W		L		T	W		L		T
Vanderbilt +	5	–	0	–	0	8	–	0	–	1
Auburn +	5	–	0	–	0	6	–	1	–	0
Sewanee	3	–	1	–	0	8	–	2	–	0
Georgia	4	–	2	–	1	6	–	2	–	1
Ole Miss	2	–	1	–	0	7	–	1	–	0
Mississippi A&M	3	–	2	–	0	7	–	2	–	0
Mercer	3	–	2	–	0	6	–	3	–	0
Georgia Tech	3	–	3	–	0	5	–	3	–	0
Clemson	2	–	3	–	1	4	–	3	–	1
LSU	1	–	3	–	0	1	–	5	–	0
Tennessee	1	–	4	–	0	3	–	5	–	1
The Citadel	0	–	2	–	0	3	–	4	–	0
Alabama	0	–	4	–	0	4	–	4	–	0
Howard (AL)	0	–	5	–	0	1	–	8	–	0
+ – Conference co-champions

The 1910 Tennessee Volunteers football team was an American football team that represented the University of Tennessee as member of the Southern Intercollegiate Athletic Association (SIAA) during the 1910 college football season. In their first year under head coach Lex Stone, the team compiled a 3–5–1 record. Tennessee played their home games at Waite Field in Knoxville, Tennessee.

== Schedule ==
Date	Opponent	Site	Result	Source
October 1	Central University*	Waite Field; Knoxville, TN	L 0–17	
October 8	Mooney School*	Waite Field; Knoxville, TN	W 6–0	
October 15	at Vanderbilt	Dudley Field; Nashville, TN (rivalry)	L 0–18	
October 22	at Georgia	Herty Field; Athens, GA (rivalry)	L 5–35	
October 29	at Howard (AL)	Alabama State Fairgrounds; Birmingham, AL	W 17–0	
October 31	at Mississippi A&M	Hardy Field; Starkville, MS	L 0–48	
November 5	Kentucky State College	Waite Field; Knoxville, TN (rivalry)	L 0–10	
November 12	Maryville (TN)*	Waite Field; Knoxville, TN	W 13–0	
November 19	Chattanooga*	Waite Field; Knoxville, TN	T 6–6	
*Non-conference game
