= 1910 Georgia Bulldogs football team =

American college football season

1910 Georgia Bulldogs football
- Conference: Southern Intercollegiate Athletic Association
- Record: 6–2–1 (4–2–1 SIAA)
- Head coach: W. A. Cunningham (1st season)
- Captain: O. W. Franklin
- Home stadium: Herty Field

1910 Southern Intercollegiate Athletic Association football standings
	Conf.					Overall
Team	W		L		T	W		L		T
Vanderbilt +	5	–	0	–	0	8	–	0	–	1
Auburn +	5	–	0	–	0	6	–	1	–	0
Sewanee	3	–	1	–	0	8	–	2	–	0
Georgia	4	–	2	–	1	6	–	2	–	1
Ole Miss	2	–	1	–	0	7	–	1	–	0
Mississippi A&M	3	–	2	–	0	7	–	2	–	0
Mercer	3	–	2	–	0	6	–	3	–	0
Georgia Tech	3	–	3	–	0	5	–	3	–	0
Clemson	2	–	3	–	1	4	–	3	–	1
LSU	1	–	3	–	0	1	–	5	–	0
Tennessee	1	–	4	–	0	3	–	5	–	1
The Citadel	0	–	2	–	0	3	–	4	–	0
Alabama	0	–	4	–	0	4	–	4	–	0
Howard (AL)	0	–	5	–	0	1	–	8	–	0
+ – Conference co-champions

The 1910 Georgia Bulldogs football team represented the University of Georgia during the 1910 college football season. The Bulldogs completed the season with a 6–2–1 record. The team started with two tune-up games that Georgia won by a combined score of 180–0. The Bulldogs notched victories over Alabama and Georgia Tech, ending a five-game losing streak to Tech. Georgia did lose to rival Auburn, but the first season under new head coach W. A. Cunningham was certainly an improvement over prior years.

The 1910 season marked the debut of more than a new coach, it also marked the debut of Bob McWhorter, one of the most notable players in Georgia history. McWhorter was a four-year letterman, lettering first in 1910. He played halfback.

== Schedule ==
Date	Opponent	Site	Result	Source
October 1	Locust Grove Institute*	Herty Field; Athens, GA	W 101–0	
October 8	Gordon*	Herty Field; Athens, GA	W 79–0	
October 15	at Alabama	Birmingham Fairgrounds; Birmingham, AL (rivalry)	W 22–0	
October 22	Tennessee	Herty Field; Athens, GA (rivalry)	W 35–5	
October 29	Mercer	Herty Field; Athens, GA	W 21–0	
November 5	at Sewanee	Hardee Field; Sewanee, TN	L 12–15	
November 10	vs. Clemson	Augusta, GA (rivalry)	T 0–0	
November 19	at Georgia Tech	Ponce de Leon Park; Atlanta, GA (rivalry)	W 11–6	
November 24	vs. Auburn	Savannah, GA (rivalry)	L 0–26	
*Non-conference game
