= 1910 Ole Miss Rebels football team =

American college football season

1910 Ole Miss Rebels football
- Conference: Southern Intercollegiate Athletic Association
- Record: 7–1 (2–1 SIAA)
- Head coach: Nathan Stauffer (2nd season)
- Captain: J. W. McCall

1910 Southern Intercollegiate Athletic Association football standings
	Conf.					Overall
Team	W		L		T	W		L		T
Vanderbilt +	5	–	0	–	0	8	–	0	–	1
Auburn +	5	–	0	–	0	6	–	1	–	0
Sewanee	3	–	1	–	0	8	–	2	–	0
Georgia	4	–	2	–	1	6	–	2	–	1
Ole Miss	2	–	1	–	0	7	–	1	–	0
Mississippi A&M	3	–	2	–	0	7	–	2	–	0
Mercer	3	–	2	–	0	6	–	3	–	0
Georgia Tech	3	–	3	–	0	5	–	3	–	0
Clemson	2	–	3	–	1	4	–	3	–	1
LSU	1	–	3	–	0	1	–	5	–	0
Tennessee	1	–	4	–	0	3	–	5	–	1
The Citadel	0	–	2	–	0	3	–	4	–	0
Alabama	0	–	4	–	0	4	–	4	–	0
Howard (AL)	0	–	5	–	0	1	–	8	–	0
+ – Conference co-champions

The 1910 Ole Miss Rebels football team was an American football team that represented the University of Mississippi (Ole Miss) as a member of the Southern Intercollegiate Athletic Association (SIAA) during the 1910 college football season. In their second year under head coach Nathan Stauffer, the Rebels compiled an overall record of 9–1, with a conference record of 2–1, and finished fifth in the SIAA. Earl Kinnebrew was All-Southern.

== Schedule ==
Date	Opponent	Site	Result	Source
October 1	Memphis High School*	Oxford, MS	W 10–0	
October 5	University of Memphis*	Oxford, MS	W 2–0	
October 13	at Tulane*	Tulane Stadium; New Orleans, LA (rivalry)	W 16–0	
October 22	at Mississippi College*	Clinton, MS	W 24–0	
October 29	at Vanderbilt	Dudley Field; Nashville, TN (rivalry)	L 2–9	
November 5	vs. Alabama	Greenville, MS (rivalry)	W 16–0	
November 12	at University of Memphis*	Red Elm Park; Memphis, TN	W 44–0	
November 24	vs. Mississippi A&M	State Fairgrounds; Jackson, MS (rivalry)	W 30–0	
*Non-conference game
