= 1910 Clemson Tigers football team =

American college football season

1910 Clemson Tigers football
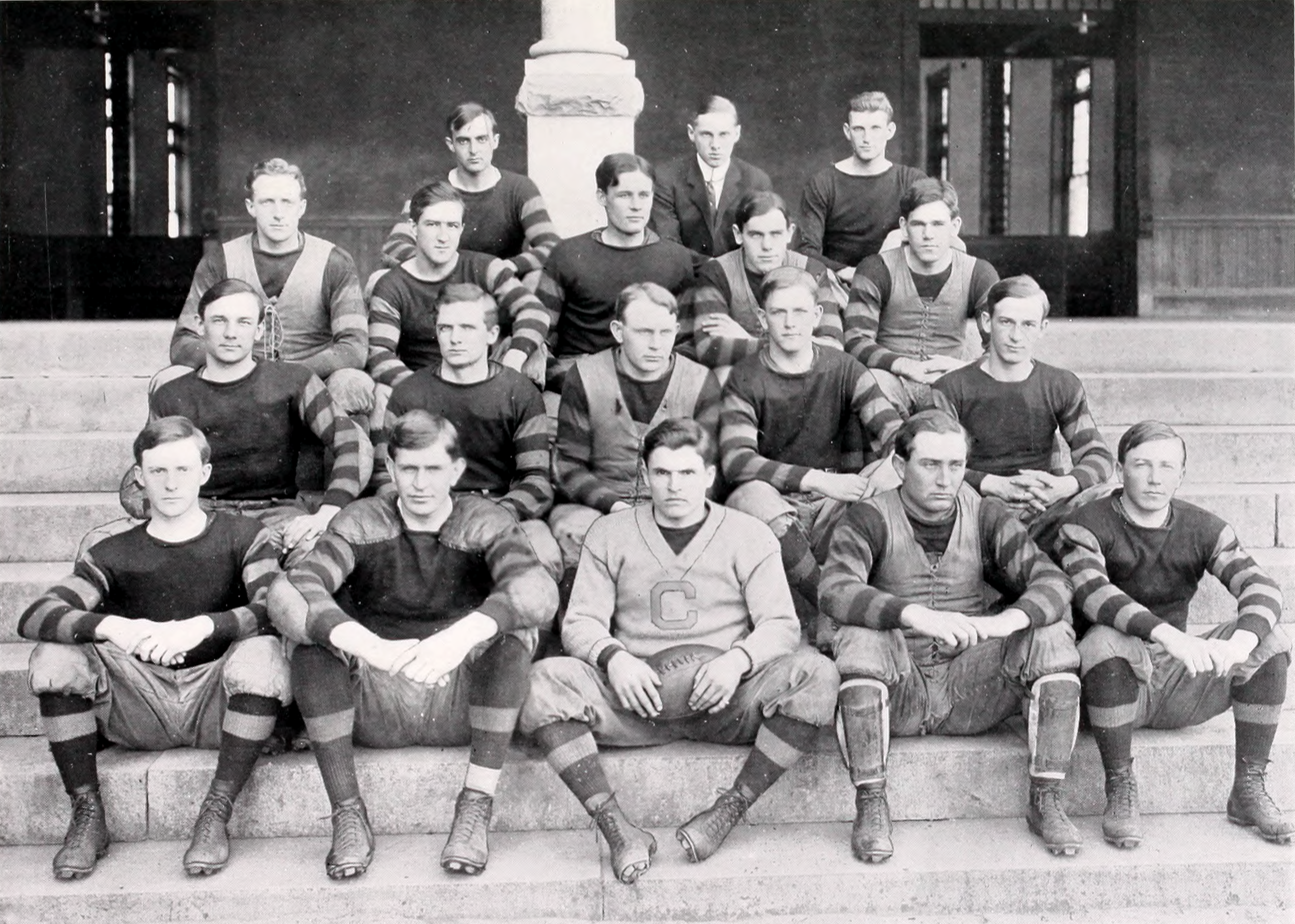
- Conference: Southern Intercollegiate Athletic Association
- Record: 4–3–1 (2–3–1 SIAA)
- Head coach: Frank Dobson (1st season)
- Captain: W. H. Hanke
- Home stadium: Bowman Field

1910 Southern Intercollegiate Athletic Association football standings
	Conf.					Overall
Team	W		L		T	W		L		T
Vanderbilt +	5	–	0	–	0	8	–	0	–	1
Auburn +	5	–	0	–	0	6	–	1	–	0
Sewanee	3	–	1	–	0	8	–	2	–	0
Georgia	4	–	2	–	1	6	–	2	–	1
Ole Miss	2	–	1	–	0	7	–	1	–	0
Mississippi A&M	3	–	2	–	0	7	–	2	–	0
Mercer	3	–	2	–	0	6	–	3	–	0
Georgia Tech	3	–	3	–	0	5	–	3	–	0
Clemson	2	–	3	–	1	4	–	3	–	1
LSU	1	–	3	–	0	1	–	5	–	0
Tennessee	1	–	4	–	0	3	–	5	–	1
The Citadel	0	–	2	–	0	3	–	4	–	0
Alabama	0	–	4	–	0	4	–	4	–	0
Howard (AL)	0	–	5	–	0	1	–	8	–	0
+ – Conference co-champions

The 1910 Clemson Tigers football team represented Clemson Agricultural College—now known as Clemson University—as a member of the Southern Intercollegiate Athletic Association (SIAA) during the 1910 college football season. Under first-year head coach Frank Dobson, the team compiled an overall record of 4–3–1 with a mark of 2–3–1 in conference play. W. H. Hanke was the captain.

== Schedule ==
Date	Opponent	Site	Result	Source
September 24	Gordon*	Bowman Field; Calhoun, SC	W 26–0	
October 1	Mercer	Bowman Field; Calhoun, SC	L 0–3	
October 8	at Howard (AL)	Alabama State Fairgrounds; Birmingham, AL	W 24–0	
October 15	at The Citadel	College Park Stadium; Charleston, SC	W 32–0	
October 22	at Auburn	Drill Field; Auburn, AL (rivalry)	L 0–17	
November 3	at South Carolina*	Fairgrounds; Columbia, SC (rivalry)	W 24–0	
November 10	vs. Georgia	Augusta, GA (rivalry)	T 0–0	
November 24	at Georgia Tech	Ponce de Leon Park; Atlanta, GA (rivalry)	L 0–34	
*Non-conference game

== Bibliography ==
- Bourret, Tim. "2010 Clemson Football Media Guide" (PDF). Clemson University. p. 202. Archived from the original (PDF) on November 12, 2012.
