= 1910 Sewanee Tigers football team =

American college football season

1910 Sewanee Tigers football
- Conference: Southern Intercollegiate Athletic Association
- Record: 8–2 (3–1 SIAA)
- Head coach: Harris G. Cope (2nd season)
- Captain: Aubrey Lanier
- Home stadium: Hardee Field

1910 Southern Intercollegiate Athletic Association football standings
	Conf.					Overall
Team	W		L		T	W		L		T
Vanderbilt +	5	–	0	–	0	8	–	0	–	1
Auburn +	5	–	0	–	0	6	–	1	–	0
Sewanee	3	–	1	–	0	8	–	2	–	0
Georgia	4	–	2	–	1	6	–	2	–	1
Ole Miss	2	–	1	–	0	7	–	1	–	0
Mississippi A&M	3	–	2	–	0	7	–	2	–	0
Mercer	3	–	2	–	0	6	–	3	–	0
Georgia Tech	3	–	3	–	0	5	–	3	–	0
Clemson	2	–	3	–	1	4	–	3	–	1
LSU	1	–	3	–	0	1	–	5	–	0
Tennessee	1	–	4	–	0	3	–	5	–	1
The Citadel	0	–	2	–	0	3	–	4	–	0
Alabama	0	–	4	–	0	4	–	4	–	0
Howard (AL)	0	–	5	–	0	1	–	8	–	0
+ – Conference co-champions

The 1910 Sewanee Tigers football team represented Sewanee: The University of the South during the 1910 college football season as a member of the Southern Intercollegiate Athletic Association (SIAA). The Tigers were led by head coach Harris G. Cope in his second season and finished with a record of eight wins and two losses (8–2 overall, 3–1 in the SIAA).

== Schedule ==
Date	Opponent	Site	Result	Attendance	Source
October 3	Sewanee Military Academy*	Hardee Field; Sewanee, TN	W 53–0		
October 8	Anderson Training School*	Hardee Field; Sewanee, TN	W 27–0		
October 12	Tennessee Military Institute*	Hardee Field; Sewanee, TN	W 95–0		
October 17	vs. Central University*	Eclipse Park; Louisville, KY	L 0–19		
October 21	Morgan Training School*	Hardee Field; Sewanee, TN	W 22–5		
October 29	vs. LSU	Pelican Park; New Orleans, LA	W 31–5		
November 1	at Memphis*	Red Elm Park; Memphis, TN	W 6–0		
November 5	Georgia	Hardee Field; Sewanee, TN	W 15–12		
November 12	at Alabama	Birmingham Fairgrounds; Birmingham, AL	W 30–0		
November 24	at Vanderbilt	Dudley Field; Nashville, TN (rivalry)	L 6–23	10,000	
*Non-conference game

== Players ==
=== Varsity lettermen ===
==== Line ====
Player	Position	Games started	Hometown	Prep school	Height	Weight	Age
Frank Faulkinberry	tackle				6'4"	198	23
Frank Gailor	guard						
Jenks Gillem	end						
Frank Gillespie	end						
Frank Juhan	center			West Texas Military Academy	5'11"	160	23
R. N. MacCallum	tackle			Mt. Vernon High			22
James Stoney	guard						

==== Backfield ====
Player	Position	Games started	Hometown	Prep school	Height	Weight	Age
Chigger Browne	quarterback				5'8"	125	22
Aubrey Lanier	halfback				5'10"	170	22
John Myers	halfback						
Guy Ward	fullback						

==== Subs ====
Player	Position	Games started	Hometown	Prep school	Height	Weight	Age
Edmund Armes
A. G. Bramwell
Carlton Bowden
Ben Cameron
Ivan Cochran
R. W. Easley
J. H. Gordon
Randolph Leigh
A. P. Magwood
Hugh McKnight
Jack Swain
