= 1910 Mississippi A&M Aggies football team =

American college football season

1910 Mississippi A&M Aggies football
- Conference: Southern Intercollegiate Athletic Association
- Record: 7–2 (3–2 SIAA)
- Head coach: W. D. Chadwick (2nd season)
- Home stadium: Hardy Field

1910 Southern Intercollegiate Athletic Association football standings
	Conf.					Overall
Team	W		L		T	W		L		T
Vanderbilt +	5	–	0	–	0	8	–	0	–	1
Auburn +	5	–	0	–	0	6	–	1	–	0
Sewanee	3	–	1	–	0	8	–	2	–	0
Georgia	4	–	2	–	1	6	–	2	–	1
Ole Miss	2	–	1	–	0	7	–	1	–	0
Mississippi A&M	3	–	2	–	0	7	–	2	–	0
Mercer	3	–	2	–	0	6	–	3	–	0
Georgia Tech	3	–	3	–	0	5	–	3	–	0
Clemson	2	–	3	–	1	4	–	3	–	1
LSU	1	–	3	–	0	1	–	5	–	0
Tennessee	1	–	4	–	0	3	–	5	–	1
The Citadel	0	–	2	–	0	3	–	4	–	0
Alabama	0	–	4	–	0	4	–	4	–	0
Howard (AL)	0	–	5	–	0	1	–	8	–	0
+ – Conference co-champions

The 1910 Mississippi A&M Aggies football team represented the Mississippi Agricultural & Mechanical College (now known as Mississippi State University) as a member of the Southern Intercollegiate Athletic Association (SIAA) during the 1910 college football season. Led by W. D. Chadwick in his second season as head coach, the Aggies compiled an overall record of 7–2 with a mark of 3–2 in conference play.

== Schedule ==
Date	Opponent	Site	Result	Source
October 1	Mississippi College*	Hardy Field; Starkville, MS	W 24–0	
October 8	at Auburn	Drill Field; Auburn, AL	L 0–6	
October 15	University of Memphis*	Hardy Field; Starkville, MS	W 6–0	
October 21	vs. LSU	Columbus Fairgrounds; Columbus, MS (rivalry)	W 3–0	
October 31	Tennessee	Hardy Field; Starkville, MS	W 48–0	
November 5	at Tulane*	Tulane Stadium; New Orleans, LA	W 10–0	
November 12	Birmingham*	Hardy Field; Starkville, MS	W 46–0	
November 18	Howard (AL)	Hardy Field; Starkville, MS	W 82–0	
November 24	vs. Ole Miss	State Fairgrounds; Jackson, MS (rivalry)	L 0–30	
*Non-conference game
