= Counter run =

Offensive play in American football

In American football, a counter run is a running play that starts in one direction but ends in the other direction. Typically, the running back will take a step in the opposite direction of the play, only to get the handoff in the other direction. Weak side linemen will sometimes pull and lead the back downfield (sometimes called a counter trap), but not necessarily. The play is designed to get the defense to flow away from the action for a few steps, allowing better blocking angles for the offensive line, and more room for the running back. The purpose of the counter run is to keep defenses honest and prevent them from easily being able to pursue the play aggressively. It is most effective against defenses that tend to overpursue and can be used on its own to potentially produce a big running play against defenses that get out of position and fail to stay home.

== Counter trey ==
The most popular variation on the counter is the counter trey. This play is designed for the offensive team to feign rushing one way, then attack the defense in the opposite direction. In a counter trey right, the center, right guard, and right tackle block left as if the play is going left, with the right tackle leaving the last defensive player on the line of scrimmage unblocked. The left guard and left tackle are pulling or turning, and running to the right parallel with the line of scrimmage. The left guard will block the last defensive player on the line of scrimmage and the tackle will cut underneath him and block the first defender in the hole.

The running back takes an initial step to the left, then cuts back to the right, receives the handoff from the quarterback, and runs off the hip of the pulling guard, with the pulling tackle leading him through the hole created by the pulling guard kicking out the last man on the line of scrimmage. The counter trey requires quick, athletic linemen for good execution.

Many teams have run this play, but it first became well-known when run by the Washington Redskins in the 1980s and the early 1990s, which they modeled from the Nebraska Cornhuskers. In particular, guard Russ Grimm and tackle Joe Jacoby would open up massive holes for John Riggins, George Rogers, and Earnest Byner.

== See also ==
- Cutback
- Feint
