= 1910 Auburn Tigers football team =

American college football season

1910 Auburn Tigers football

National champion (Billingsley, Maxwell Ratings) SIAA co-champion
- Conference: Southern Intercollegiate Athletic Association
- Record: 6–1 (5–0 SIAA)
- Head coach: Mike Donahue (6th season)
- Base defense: 7–2–2
- Captain: John E. Davis
- Home stadium: Drill Field

1910 Southern Intercollegiate Athletic Association football standings
	Conf.					Overall
Team	W		L		T	W		L		T
Vanderbilt +	5	–	0	–	0	8	–	0	–	1
Auburn +	5	–	0	–	0	6	–	1	–	0
Sewanee	3	–	1	–	0	8	–	2	–	0
Georgia	4	–	2	–	1	6	–	2	–	1
Ole Miss	2	–	1	–	0	7	–	1	–	0
Mississippi A&M	3	–	2	–	0	7	–	2	–	0
Mercer	3	–	2	–	0	6	–	3	–	0
Georgia Tech	3	–	3	–	0	5	–	3	–	0
Clemson	2	–	3	–	1	4	–	3	–	1
LSU	1	–	3	–	0	1	–	5	–	0
Tennessee	1	–	4	–	0	3	–	5	–	1
The Citadel	0	–	2	–	0	3	–	4	–	0
Alabama	0	–	4	–	0	4	–	4	–	0
Howard (AL)	0	–	5	–	0	1	–	8	–	0
+ – Conference co-champions

The 1910 Auburn Tigers football team represented Alabama Polytechnic Institute (now known Auburn University) as a member of the Southern Intercollegiate Athletic Association (SIAA) during the 1910 college football season. The team was led by head coach Mike Donahue, in his sixth year, and played their home games at both the Drill Field in Auburn, Alabama. They finished the season with a record of six wins and one loss, and finished as SIAA co-champion. The team's leading scorer was Bill Streit. On August 19, 2025, Auburn University formally recognized the 1910 football team as national champions, based on various selectors.

== Schedule ==
Date	Opponent	Site	Result	Source
October 8	Mississippi A&M	Drill Field; Auburn, AL	W 6–0	
October 14	at Howard (AL)	West End Park; Birmingham, AL	W 78–0	
October 22	Clemson	Drill Field; Auburn, AL (rivalry)	W 17–0	
October 29	at Texas*	Clark Field; Austin, TX	L 0–9	
November 5	at Georgia Tech	Ponce de Leon Park; Atlanta, GA (rivalry)	W 16–0	
November 12	vs. Tulane*	Harrison County Fairgrounds; Gulfport, MS (rivalry)	W 33–0	
November 24	vs. Georgia	Savannah, GA (rivalry)	W 26–0	
*Non-conference game
