= Locust Grove Historic District =

Historic district in Georgia, United States

- U.S. National Register of Historic Places
- U.S. Historic district
- Location: Centered along GA 42/US 23 between Hi-Hope Dr. & Grove Rd., Locust Grove, Georgia
- Coordinates: 33°20′51″N 84°06′35″W
- Area: 310 acres (130 ha)
- Architectural style: Late 19th and Early 20th Century American Movements
- NRHP reference No.: 16000451
- Added to NRHP: July 18, 2016

The Locust Grove Historic District, in Locust Grove, Georgia, is a 310 acres (130 ha) historic district which was listed on the National Register of Historic Places in 2016.

It is centered on GA 42/US 23 between Hi-Hope Dr. & Grove Rd. The district includes 157 contributing buildings, a contributing structure, and two contributing sites, as well as 76 non-contributing buildings.

It includes:

Resource	Photo	Dates	Location	Notes
Locust Grove Institute Academic Building now City Hall			3644 State Route 42//US 23; 33°21′07″N 84°06′50″W	Separately listed on the National Register
House at 3590 Highway 42			3590 Highway 42; 33.353745°N 84.114298°W	Queen Anne-style house, serving as Locust Grove Veterinary Clinic
House at 377 N. Jackson St.			377 N. Jackson St. 33.355047°N 84.114186°W	Queen Anne-style
House at 3550 GA-42			3550 GA-42; 33.354490°N 84.115049°W	
House at 3570 GA-42			3570 GA-42; 33.354068°N 84.114550°W	
House at 339 N. Jackson St.			339 N. Jackson St. 33.355928°N 84.114936°W	
