= 1910 LSU Tigers football team =

American college football season

1910 LSU Tigers football
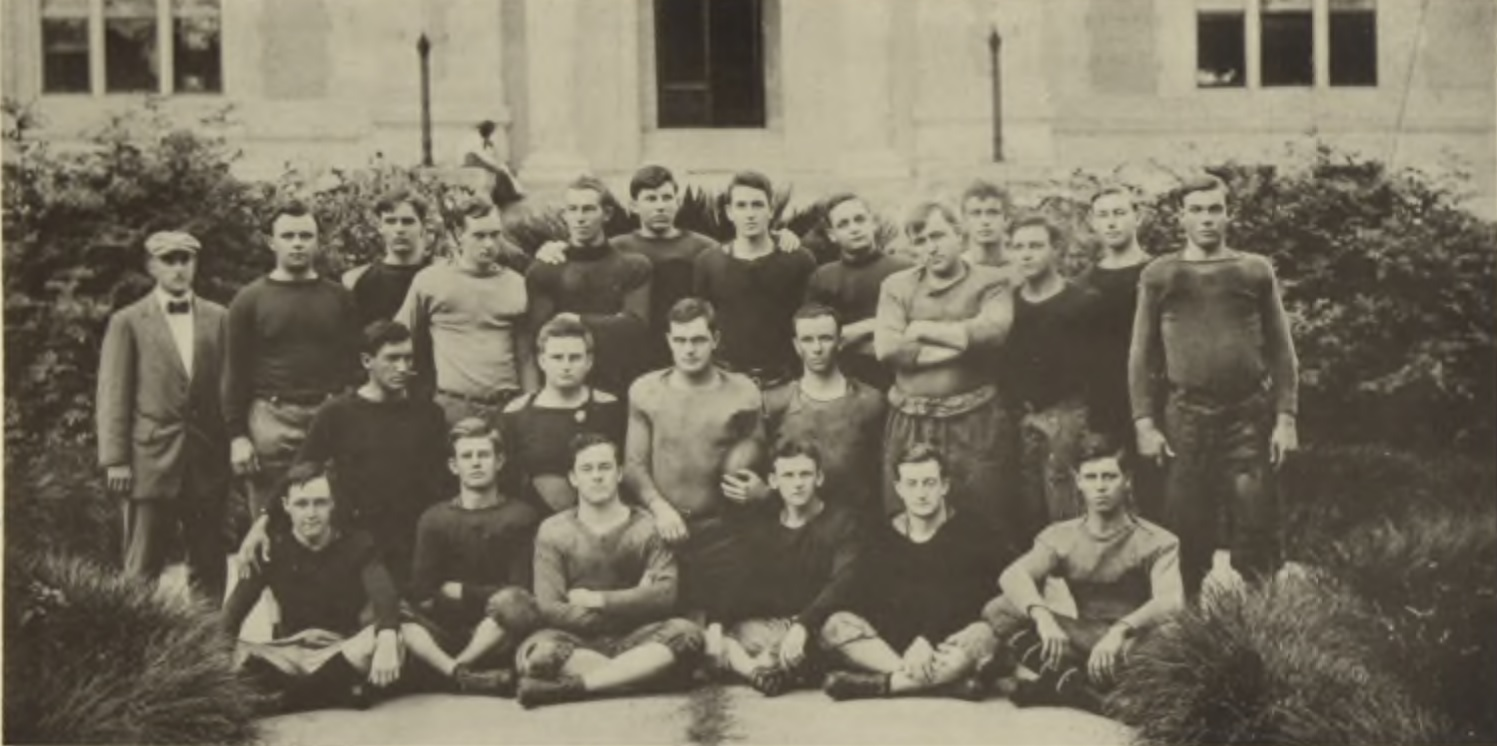
- Conference: Southern Intercollegiate Athletic Association
- Record: 1–5 (1–3 SIAA)
- Head coach: John W. Mayhew (2nd season)
- Captain: John Seip
- Home stadium: State Field

1910 Southern Intercollegiate Athletic Association football standings
	Conf.					Overall
Team	W		L		T	W		L		T
Vanderbilt +	5	–	0	–	0	8	–	0	–	1
Auburn +	5	–	0	–	0	6	–	1	–	0
Sewanee	3	–	1	–	0	8	–	2	–	0
Georgia	4	–	2	–	1	6	–	2	–	1
Ole Miss	2	–	1	–	0	7	–	1	–	0
Mississippi A&M	3	–	2	–	0	7	–	2	–	0
Mercer	3	–	2	–	0	6	–	3	–	0
Georgia Tech	3	–	3	–	0	5	–	3	–	0
Clemson	2	–	3	–	1	4	–	3	–	1
LSU	1	–	3	–	0	1	–	5	–	0
Tennessee	1	–	4	–	0	3	–	5	–	1
The Citadel	0	–	2	–	0	3	–	4	–	0
Alabama	0	–	4	–	0	4	–	4	–	0
Howard (AL)	0	–	5	–	0	1	–	8	–	0
+ – Conference co-champions

The 1910 LSU Tigers football team represented Louisiana State University (LSU) as a member of the Southern Intercollegiate Athletic Association (SIAA) during the 1910 college football season. John W. Mayhew in his second and final season as head coach, the Tigers compiled an overall record of 1–5 with a mark of 1–3 in SIAA play.

== Schedule ==
Date	Opponent	Site	Result	Source
October 15	Mississippi College	State Field; Baton Rouge, LA	W 40–0	
October 21	vs. Mississippi A&M	Columbus Fairgrounds; Columbus, MS (rivalry)	L 0–3	
October 29	vs. Sewanee	Pelican Park; New Orleans, LA	L 5–31	
November 5	at Vanderbilt	Dudley Field; Nashville, TN	L 0–22	
November 19	at Texas*	Clark Field; Austin, TX	L 0–12	
November 24	vs. Arkansas*	West End Park; Little Rock, AR (rivalry)	L 0–51	
*Non-conference game

== Roster ==
No.	Player	Position	Height	Weight	Hometown	High School
-	C. P. Bond	Halfback	-	-	-	-
-	Lawrence H. Dupont	-	-	-	Houma, LA	-
-	W. Morton Evans	End, Halfback	-	-	Baton Rouge, LA	-
-	Marshall L. Gosserand	-	-	-	New Roads, LA	-
-	J. O. Hall	-	-	-	Lake Charles, LA	-
-	M. R. Hammond	-	-	-	Jennings, LA	-
-	Michael F. Lally	Halfback	-	-	Jessup, PA	-
-	C. Y. Martin	Guard	-	-	Bowie, LA	-
-	Barney G. McHenry	-	-	-	Monroe, LA	-
-	William M. Pollock	-	-	-	Bernice, LA	-
-	John H. Potts	End	-	-	Baton Rouge, LA	-
-	Charles S. Reily	Tackle	-	-	Clinton, LA	-
-	John J. Seip	End	-	-	Allentown, PA	-
-	Arthur J. Thomas	-	-	-	Baton Rouge, LA	-

Roster from Fanbase.com
