= Bradley Streit =

American football player (1892–1978)

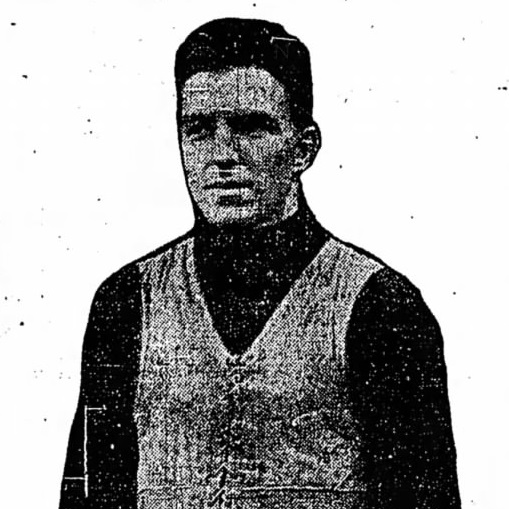
- Streit of Auburn

Princeton Tigers
- Position: Fullback

Personal information
- Born: December 18, 1892; Birmingham, Alabama, U.S.
- Died: June 30, 1978 (aged 85); North York, Ontario, Canada
- Listed weight: 170 lb (77 kg)

Career information
- College: Auburn (1909–1910); Princeton (1913–1915)

Awards and highlights
- All-Southern (1910)

John Bradley "Bill" Streit (December 18, 1892 – June 30, 1978) was an American college football player.

== Early life ==
John Bradley Streit was born on December 18, 1892, in Birmingham, Alabama, the son of a prominent builder. "He grew up in the give-and-take life of a family of nine."

== College football ==
=== Auburn ===
Streit competed in football, basketball, baseball, and track at Auburn University. He was a prominent fullback for the Auburn Tigers from 1909 to 1910.

==== 1910 ====
Streit led the school in touchdowns in 1910. He was a unanimous All-Southern player. Early in the season both Streit and Kirk Newell were injured. In the 26 to 0 victory over the Georgia Bulldogs, Streit scored two touchdowns. Streit assisted coaching the 1911 team.

=== Princeton ===
Streit then transferred to Princeton University and played for the Princeton Tigers football team from 1913 to 1915.

==== 1913 ====
In the 1913 game with Fordham he scored four touchdowns and four extra points in a 69 to 0 victory, setting a school record for points by an individual in a game (28) which stood until 1967.

== Later life and death ==
Streit worked at a salesman for Studebaker and for W. E. Hutton & Co., a stock brokerage firm on Wall Street. He moved to Canada in 1934 and became a Canadian citizen. He was the president J. Bradley Streit Corp., an oil and gas exploration firm based in Toronto. Streit was a founder of Yellowknife Bear Mines Ltd. He died on June 30, 1978, at his home on Park Lane Circle in North York.
