= 1910 The Citadel Bulldogs football team =

American college football season

1910 The Citadel Bulldogs football
- Conference: Southern Intercollegiate Athletic Association
- Record: 3–4 (0–2 SIAA)
- Head coach: Sam Costen (2nd season)
- Captain: Barnwell R. Legge
- Home stadium: College Park Stadium

1910 Southern Intercollegiate Athletic Association football standings
	Conf.					Overall
Team	W		L		T	W		L		T
Vanderbilt +	5	–	0	–	0	8	–	0	–	1
Auburn +	5	–	0	–	0	6	–	1	–	0
Sewanee	3	–	1	–	0	8	–	2	–	0
Georgia	4	–	2	–	1	6	–	2	–	1
Ole Miss	2	–	1	–	0	7	–	1	–	0
Mississippi A&M	3	–	2	–	0	7	–	2	–	0
Mercer	3	–	2	–	0	6	–	3	–	0
Georgia Tech	3	–	3	–	0	5	–	3	–	0
Clemson	2	–	3	–	1	4	–	3	–	1
LSU	1	–	3	–	0	1	–	5	–	0
Tennessee	1	–	4	–	0	3	–	5	–	1
The Citadel	0	–	2	–	0	3	–	4	–	0
Alabama	0	–	4	–	0	4	–	4	–	0
Howard (AL)	0	–	5	–	0	1	–	8	–	0
+ – Conference co-champions

The 1910 The Citadel Bulldogs football team represented The Citadel as a member of Southern Intercollegiate Athletic Association (SIAA) during the 1910 college football season. This was the sixth year of intercollegiate football at The Citadel, with Sam Costen serving as coach for the second season. All home games are believed to have been played at College Park Stadium in Hampton Park.

== Schedule ==
Date	Opponent	Site	Result	Attendance	Source
October 15	Clemson	College Park Stadium; Charleston, SC	L 0–32		
October 22	College of Charleston*	College Park Stadium; Charleston, SC	L 0–11		
October 29	Wake Forest*	College Park Stadium; Charleston, SC	W 9–5		
November 5	vs. Florida*	Jacksonville, FL	L 2–6		
November 18	vs. Mercer	Savannah, GA	L 0–21		
November 24	South Carolina*	College Park Stadium; Charleston, SC	W 5–0	700	
December 3	Charleston Navy*	College Park Stadium; Charleston, SC	W 10–0		
*Non-conference game
