= Juke (football move) =

Deceptive move in American football

A Mack Brown juke depicted.

A juke is a move in gridiron football used to evade a tackler by deception, and thus without need of a stiff arm. It can also be called sidestepping.

A typical juke involves a ball-carrier faking as if he will run one way, then planting his foot and running the opposite. When this is done against the flow of play, it is called a cutback.

== Spin move ==
One variation on the common juke is a spin move.

== See also ==
- Juking
