= Ted Ross (American football) =

American football player

Profile
- Position: Guard
- Class: 1910

Career information
- College: Vanderbilt (1909)

Awards and highlights
- All-Southern (1909)

Ted Ross was a college football player for coach Dan McGugin's Vanderbilt Commodores football teams, selected All-Southern in 1909.
