= James C. Donnelly =

American lawyer

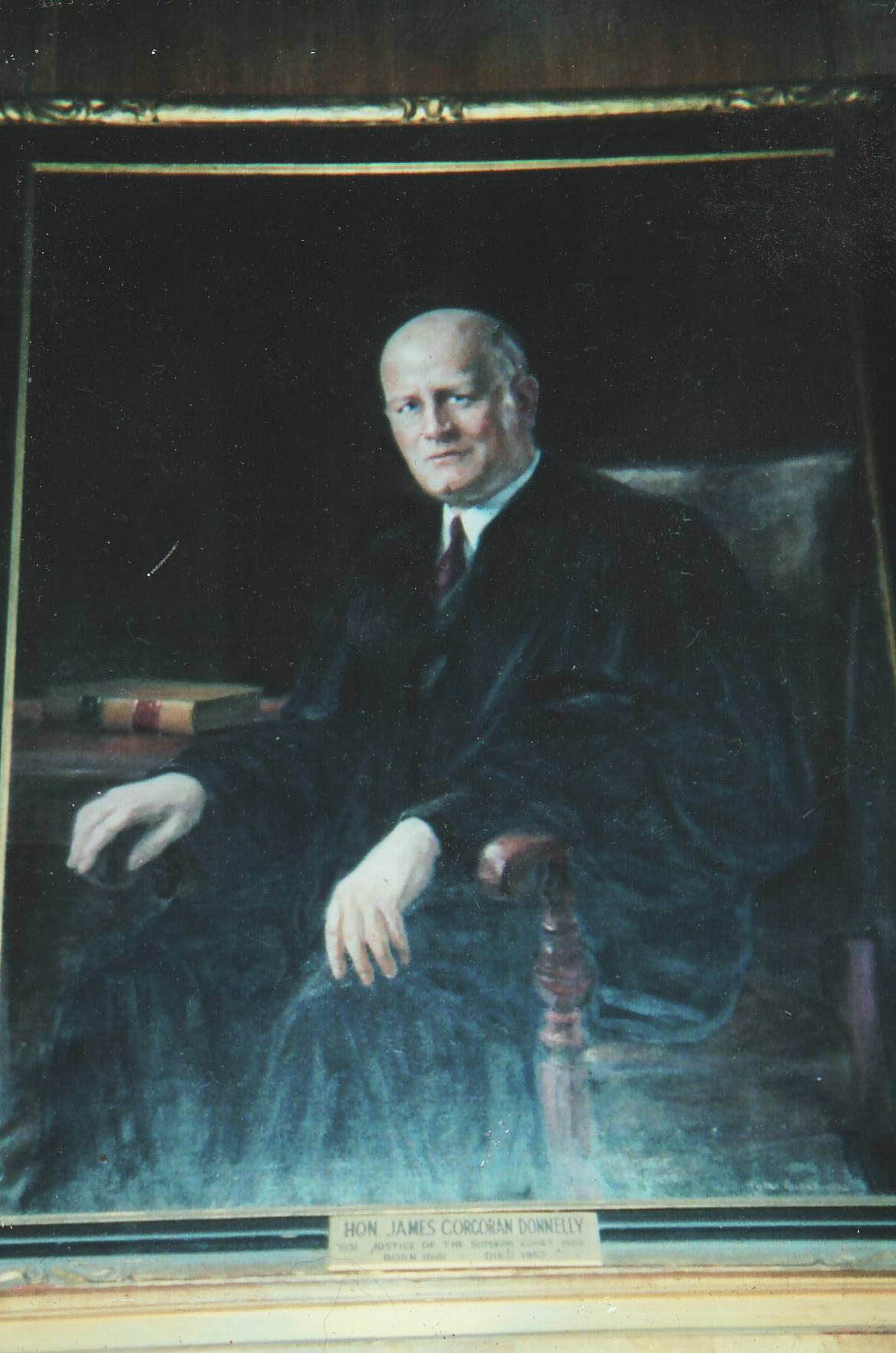
- Portrait of Judge James C. Donnelly, Worcester County Courthouse

Biographical details
- Born: December 9, 1881; Clinton, Massachusetts, U.S.
- Died: March 24, 1952 (aged 70); Ashland, Virginia, U.S.

Playing career

Football
- 1904: Dartmouth

Coaching career (HC unless noted)

Football
- 1909: Worcester Tech
- 1910: Howard (AL)
- 1911: Worcester Tech
- 1912–1914: Miami (OH)
- 1915: Worcester Tech

Baseball
- 1909: Howard (AL)

Head coaching record
- Overall: 22–32–4 (college football)

James Corcoran Donnelly (December 9, 1881 – March 24, 1952) was an American college football player and coach in the early 1900s. He played football at Worcester's Classical High School then went on to Dartmouth where he played football. After graduation in 1905 he went to Harvard Law School and was admitted to the bar in 1908. He practiced law and served as head football coach at Worcester Polytechnic Institute (1909, 1911, 1915), Howard College in Birmingham, Alabama (1910), and Miami University in Oxford, Ohio (1912–1914), compiling a career college football record of 22–32–4. In 1931, he was appointed a Superior Court judge. His younger brother, Charley Donnelly also coached football at the high school and college level. His youngest brother, Ralph E. Donnelly, was also a standout football player and war hero.

== Early life ==
Donnelly was born on December 9, 1881, in Clinton, Massachusetts. Donnelly was the oldest of seven children born to John E. Donnelly and Mary Ellen Corcoran Donnelly. His father immigrated from England and was a machinist in Clinton. James graduated from Classical High School in Worcester.

== College career ==
He attended Dartmouth College where he graduated with an A.B. in 1905. He excelled in football where he played end on the first Dartmouth football team to beat Harvard. In 1904, his final year, he lettered under coach Fred Folsom. That year, he helped the Dartmouth eleven to an undefeated record of 9–0–1 with a scoreless tie to national power Harvard. Donnelly played alongside three Walter Camp All-Americans, Joseph Gilman at guard (2nd team), Ralph Glaze at end (3rd team) and James Vaughn at halfback (3rd team). The team out scored its opponents by a combined score of 143 to 13. After graduating from Dartmouth, Donnelly attended Harvard Law School and graduated in 1907.

== Legal career ==
After graduating from Harvard, he was admitted to the bar in 1908 and became a lawyer in Worcester, Massachusetts. Early in his career, he clerked in the law office of Thayer & Cobb, where he worked with Webster Thayer, later the judge in the Sacco and Vanzetti Trial. In 1908, he became law partners with Charles F. Campbell. In 1931, he was appointed as a judge in the Superior Court in Worcester by Governor Joseph B. Ely.

== Coaching career ==
In the fall of 1905 he began coaching local high schools and colleges in the area. During the period from 1905 to 1909 he was the football coach of one or two teams per season including at Worcester High School, Worcester Polytechnic Institute, and Highland Military Academy of Worcester. In 1910 he took the head football job at Howard College (now known as Samford University) in Birmingham, Alabama. His team finished the season with a 1–8 record and was outscored 304 to 10. In 1911 he returned to coach at Worcester Polytechnic Institute until he was hired for the 1912 football season as an acting professor of physical education and football coach at Miami University in Oxford, Ohio. In the three years as head coach at Miami he had a combined record 14–8–2. Donnelly was replaced as head football coach for the 1915 season by Chester J. Roberts. At the time Miami was changing their philosophy of athletics by moving to an all-year athletic coach. Donnelly was unable to be in Oxford for the entire school year since he could only take a limited amount of time off from his law practice in Massachusetts.

== Personal life ==
Donnelly married Mary O'Reilly of Worcester on October 21, 1920. They had three children: James, Jr., Rosemary, and Elizabeth Ann. Donnelly was killed in a traffic accident in Ashland, Virginia, on the way back from Florida, on March 24, 1952. His car was hit head on by a truck. His wife and his daughter, Rosemary were also in the car at the time of the accident, with Rosemary also being killed.

== Head coaching record ==
=== College football ===
Year	Team	Overall	Conference	Standing	Bowl/playoffs
Worcester Tech Engineers (Independent) (1909)
1909	Worcester Tech	3–4–1			
Howard Baptists (Southern Intercollegiate Athletic Association) (1910)
1910	Howard	1–8	0–5		
Howard:		1–8	0–5		
Worcester Tech Engineers (Independent) (1911)
1911	Worcester Tech	1–7			
Miami Redskins (Ohio Athletic Conference) (1912–1914)
1912	Miami	3–3–2	1–1–2	T–5th	
1913	Miami	6–2	4–2	4th	
1914	Miami	5–3	4–2	T–3rd	
Miami:		14–8–2	9–5–2		
Worcester Tech Engineers (Independent) (1915)
1915	Worcester Tech	3–5–1			
Worcester Tech:		7–16–2			
Total:		22–32–4			
