= Bill Neely (American football) =

American football player (1887–1965)

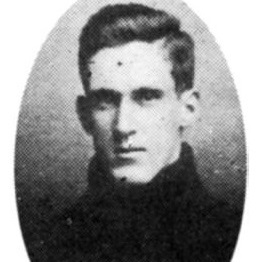

Profile
- Position: End/Halfback

Personal information
- Born: June 22, 1887; Smyrna, Tennessee, U.S.
- Died: May 16, 1965 (aged 77); Smyrna, Tennessee, U.S.
- Listed height: 5 ft 11 in (1.80 m)
- Listed weight: 156 lb (71 kg)

Career information
- College: Vanderbilt (1908–1910)

Awards and highlights
- SIAA championship (1910); All-Southern (1909, 1910)

William Daniel Neely Jr. (June 22, 1887 – May 16, 1965) was a college football player.

== Early life ==
William, Jr. was born on June 22, 1887, in Smyrna, Tennessee, to William Daniel Neely, Sr. and Mary Elizabeth Gooch. His father William died of sunstroke in 1900. His brother Jess Neely was a College Football Hall of Fame coach and captain of the undefeated 1922 Vanderbilt Commodores football team.

== Vanderbilt University ==
He was a prominent end and halfback for Dan McGugin's Vanderbilt Commodores football teams. Bill also lettered for the Vanderbilt basketball team.

=== Football ===
==== 1910 ====
He was captain of the undefeated and SIAA champion 1910 team, led as well by the likes of W. E. Metzger and Ray Morrison. That team managed a scoreless tie with defending national champion Yale. Neely recalled the event: "The score tells the story a good deal better than I can. All I want to say is that I never saw a football team fight any harder at every point than Vanderbilt fought today – line, ends, and backfield. We went in to give Yale the best we had and I think we about did it." Neely was selected for the College Football All-Southern team.

== Later life ==
He was a schoolteacher, a member of the board of directors of the Rutherford County Creamery and manager of the Production Credit Association of Springfield.

== See also ==
- 1910 Vanderbilt vs. Yale football game
