= 1910 Vanderbilt vs. Yale football game =

1910 Vanderbilt Commodores vs. Yale Bulldogs football game
Vanderbilt Commodores	Yale Bulldogs
(4–0)	(4–1)
0	0
Head coach: Dan McGugin	Head coach: Ted Coy
	1	2	3	4	Total
Vanderbilt	0	0	0	0	0
Yale	0	0	0	0	0
- Date: October 22, 1910
- Season: 1910
- Stadium: Yale Field
- Location: New Haven, Connecticut
- Referee: Dave Fultz

The 1910 Vanderbilt vs Yale football game, played October 22, 1910, was a college football game between the Vanderbilt Commodores and Yale Bulldogs. Vanderbilt managed to hold defending national champion Yale to a scoreless tie on its home field, the south's first great showing against an Eastern power. It was the first home game in which Yale failed to score a point.

== Game summary ==
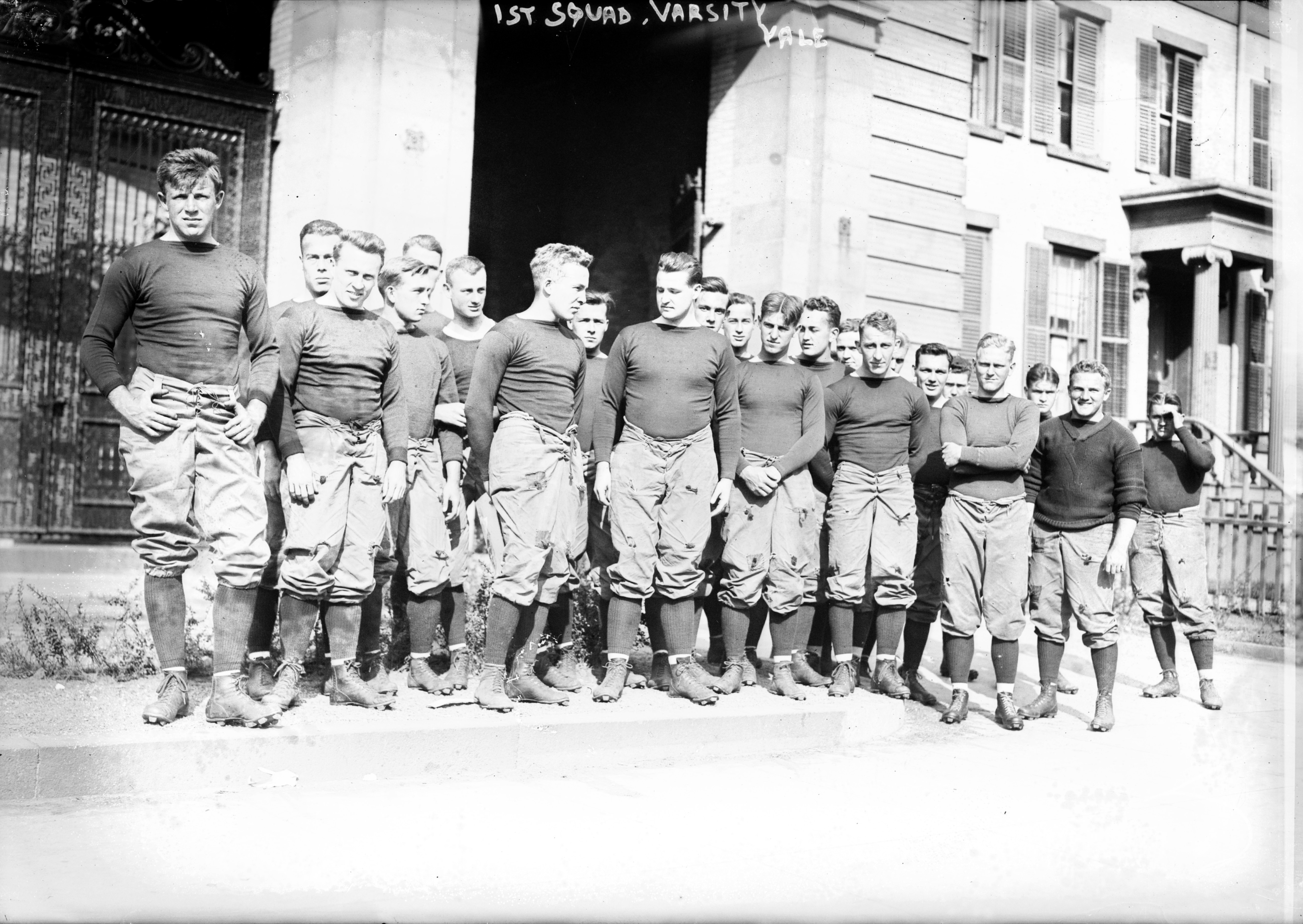
A 1910 Yale team

"Four times brilliant rushes around end by Capt. Neely brought the ball well into Yale territory, only to be lost because of penalties against the visitors. Vanderbilt did not substitute a single player."

== Aftermath ==
Vanderbilt captain Bill Neely, brother of Jess Neely, recalled the event: "The score tells the story a good deal better than I can. All I want to say is that I never saw a football team fight any harder at every point that Vanderbilt fought today – line, ends, and backfield. We went in to give Yale the best we had and I think we about did it." In Nashville on the night of the game, over a thousand Vanderbilt students (boys) "clad in nightshirts, pajamas and curtailed bonnets," celebrated with a parade march through the streets, and after a trip to the woman's college, with a bonfire at Dudley Field well into the night.

Grantland Rice wrote:

These are the gladdest of possible words,

"Yale Was Unable to Score"

Sweeter than song from the clear singing birds,

"Yale Was Unable to Score" Words that are sweeter than nectar and honey

Sweeter by far than the jungle of money,

Words that are roseate, golden and sunny,

"Yale Was Unable to Score"

Find in the classics another such phrase,

"Commodores Draw With the Blue,"

Phrase that is all to the ripple and razzle,

Canonized cluster of words on the dazzle,

Words that have Emerson smashed to a frazzle

"Commodores Draw with the Blue"
