= Charles C. Stroud =

American sports coach (1870–1949)

Biographical details
- Born: October 23, 1870; Thompson, Connecticut, U.S.
- Died: December 8, 1949 (aged 79); Natchitoches, Louisiana, U.S.

Playing career

Football
- c. 1893: Tufts

Baseball
- c. 1893: Tufts
- Position: End (football)

Coaching career (HC unless noted)

Football
- 1895: Tufts (assistant)
- 1905–1907: Rochester (NY)
- 1910–1912: Mercer

Basketball
- 1905–1908: Rochester (NY)
- 1910–1913: Mercer
- 1913–1918: LSU
- 1919–1920: LSU

Baseball
- 1910: Rochester (NY)
- 1910–1913: Mercer
- 1914–1921: LSU
- 1916–1930: Louisiana State Normal

Administrative career (AD unless noted)
- 1910–1913: Mercer
- 1913–1923: LSU
- 1924–?: Louisiana State Normal

Head coaching record
- Overall: 26–23–4 (football)

Charles Crawford "Doc" Stroud (October 23, 1870 – December 8, 1949) was an American football, basketball, and baseball coach and college athletics administrator.

Stroud was born on October 26, 1870, in Thompson, Connecticut, and attended Putnam High School in Putnam, Connecticut. He graduated from Tufts College in 1894. At Tufts, he played on the varsity football and baseball team and was captain of the track team. He taught for a year at Burr and Burton Academy in Manchester, Vermont, before returning to Tufts in 1895 to attend Tufts Medical College and coach football. Stroud earned a Doctor of Medicine degree from Tufts in 1897 and subsequently served as the school's physical director of athletics. He resigned from his position at Tufts in 1905 to succeed J. W. H. Pollard as physical director and athletic coach at University of Rochester.

In 1910, Stroud was hired as the athletic director at Mercer University. He left Mercer in 1913 to become the athletic director at Louisiana State University (LSU). At LSU, he also served as head coach for the LSU Tigers men's basketball and LSU Tigers baseball teams. He coached the men's basketball team from 1913 to 1918 and compiled a record of 63 wins and 19 losses. He coached the baseball team for eight seasons from 1914 to 1921 and compiled a record of 75–58–5. Stroud was also the head baseball coach and athletic director at Louisiana State Normal School—now known as Northwestern State University–Natchitoches, Louisiana. He is the namesake of H. Alvin Brown–C. C. Stroud Field.

Stroud died on December 8, 1949, in Natchitoches.

== Head coaching record ==
=== Football ===
Year	Team	Overall	Conference	Standing	Bowl/playoffs
Rochester Yellowjackets (Independent) (1905–1907)
1905	Rochester	4–3			
1906	Rochester	2–5–2			
1907	Rochester	5–4			
Rochester:		11–12–2			
Mercer Baptists (Southern Intercollegiate Athletic Association) (1910–1912)
1910	Mercer	6–3	3–2	T–7th	
1911	Mercer	4–5–1	2–5	14th	
1912	Mercer	5–3–1	2–3–1	13th	
Mercer:		15–11–2	7–10–1		
Total:		26–23–4			

=== Basketball ===
Record table
Season	Team	Overall	Conference	Standing	Postseason
Mercer Baptists (Southern Intercollegiate Athletic Association) (1911–1913)
1911	Mercer	8–5	2–1		
1912	Mercer	14–4	2–0	1st	
1913	Mercer	5–6	3–4		
Mercer:		27–15 (.643)	7–5 (.583)		
LSU Tigers (Southern Intercollegiate Athletic Association) (1914–1918)
1914	LSU	7–5	0–4		
1915	LSU	10–1	3–1	1st	
1916	LSU	14–10	6–7		
1917	LSU	20–2	11–0	1st	
1918	LSU	12–1	3–0		
LSU:		63–19 (.768)	23–12 (.657)		
LSU Tigers (Southern Intercollegiate Athletic Association) (1920–1920)
1920	LSU	19–2	8–2		
LSU:		82–21 (.796)	31–14 (.689)		
Total:		109–36 (.752)			
