= Cutback (move) =

Offensive maneuver in invasion sports

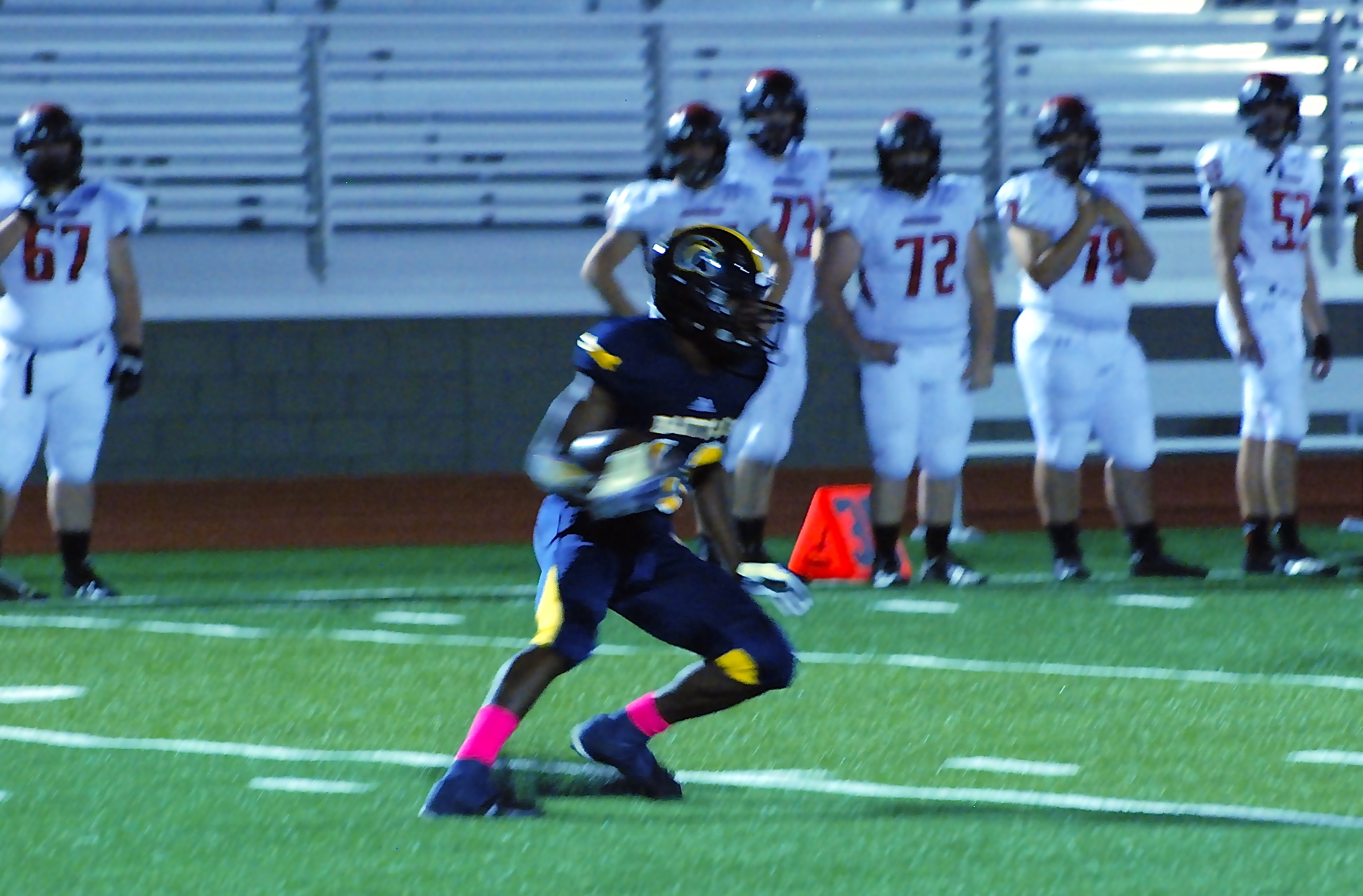
A wide receiver for Jackson High School performing a cutback (2013)

A cutback is a sudden change in direction by a ball carrier in an invasion sport, usually against the flow of the play.

In gridiron football, one common type of cutback would be turning an end run into a run down the middle. It is a common type of juke and the basis of the counter run.

In association football, cutbacks were used the most out of any year during the 2022 FIFA World Cup.
