= W. A. Cunningham =

American football and basketball coach (1886–1968)

Biographical details
- Born: July 9, 1886; Nashville, Tennessee, U.S.
- Died: August 15, 1968 (aged 82); Atlanta, Georgia, U.S.

Playing career

Football
- 1906: Vanderbilt
- Position: End

Coaching career (HC unless noted)

Football
- 1910–1919: Georgia

Basketball
- 1910–1911: Georgia
- 1916–1917: Georgia

Track and field
- 1913–1916: Georgia

Head coaching record
- Overall: 43–18–9 (football); 10–6 (basketball)

William Alexander Cunningham (July 9, 1886 – August 15, 1968) was an American college football and college basketball coach. He served as the head football coach at the University of Georgia from 1910 to 1919, compiling a record of 43–18–9. Cunningham was also the head basketball coach at Georgia (1910–1911, 1916–1917), tallying a mark of 10–6.

== Coaching career ==
Cunningham was the 14th head football coach at the University of Georgia and brought both continuity and success to the team. In the 18 years of the Georgia Bulldogs football program at prior to his arrival, the team had 13 different head coaches with no head coach serving for more than three years. Cunningham was a graduate of Vanderbilt University and gained football experience under longtime Vanderbilt Commodores football head coach Dan McGugin. Cunningham was an active member of the Sigma Chi fraternity's Alpha Psi chapter as an undergraduate at Vanderbilt and the Delta chapter at Georgia during law school. He was a faculty advisor for the Delta chapter during his coaching career at Georgia.

Cunningham came to the attention of Steadman Vincent Sanford, then the athletic director at Georgia, when the baseball team that Cunningham was coaching, Gordon Military Institute, was playing at the Bulldogs. Sanford had a conversation with Cunningham and presented him with a $1,350 contract on the spot. Bob McWhorter followed his coach to Georgia.

During Cunningham's ten-year tenure as head football coach at Georgia, the Bulldogs only played eight seasons, disbanding the team in 1917 and 1918 as a result of World War I, but his teams produced seven winning seasons, two more than in the first 18 years of the program's history before Cunningham took the reins. Cunningham compiled a 43–18–9 coaching record at Georgia. He also coached Georgia's first All-American, McWhorter, and George "Kid" Woodruff, who assumed the head coaching duties at Georgia in 1923.

During the hiatus of Georgia football in 1917 and 1918, Cunningham joined the United States Army. He returned to coaching in 1919 for one year, then re-enlisted in the Army. Cunningham reached the rank of general in the Army. He also served in World War II with the, achieving the rank of colonel. Cunningham died on August 15, 1968, and was buried in the Marietta National Cemetery in Marietta, Georgia. Cunningham's grandson was Atlanta musician Bruce Hampton.

== Head coaching record ==
=== Football ===
Year	Team	Overall	Conference	Standing	Bowl/playoffs
Georgia Bulldogs (Southern Intercollegiate Athletic Association) (1910–1919)
1910	Georgia	6–2–1	3–2–1		
1911	Georgia	7–1–1	4–1–1		
1912	Georgia	6–1–1	5–1–1		
1913	Georgia	6–2	4–2		
1914	Georgia	3–5–1	2–5–1		
1915	Georgia	5–2–2	3–2–2		
1916	Georgia	6–3	6–2		
1917	No team—World War I				
1918	No team—World War I				
1919	Georgia	4–2–3	4–2–3		
Georgia:		43–18–9	31–17–9		
Total:		43–18–9			

=== Basketball ===
Record table
Season	Team	Overall	Conference	Standing	Postseason
Georgia Bulldogs (Southern Intercollegiate Athletic Association) (1911–1912)
1911–12	Georgia	2–5			
Georgia Bulldogs (Southern Intercollegiate Athletic Association) (1916–1917)
1916–17	Georgia	8–1	4–0		
Georgia:		10–6			
Total:		10–6			
National champion Postseason invitational champion Conference regular season champion Conference regular season and conference tournament champion Division regular season champion Division regular season and conference tournament champion Conference tournament champion
