= 1910 Georgia Tech Yellow Jackets football team =

American college football season

1910 Georgia Tech Yellow Jackets football
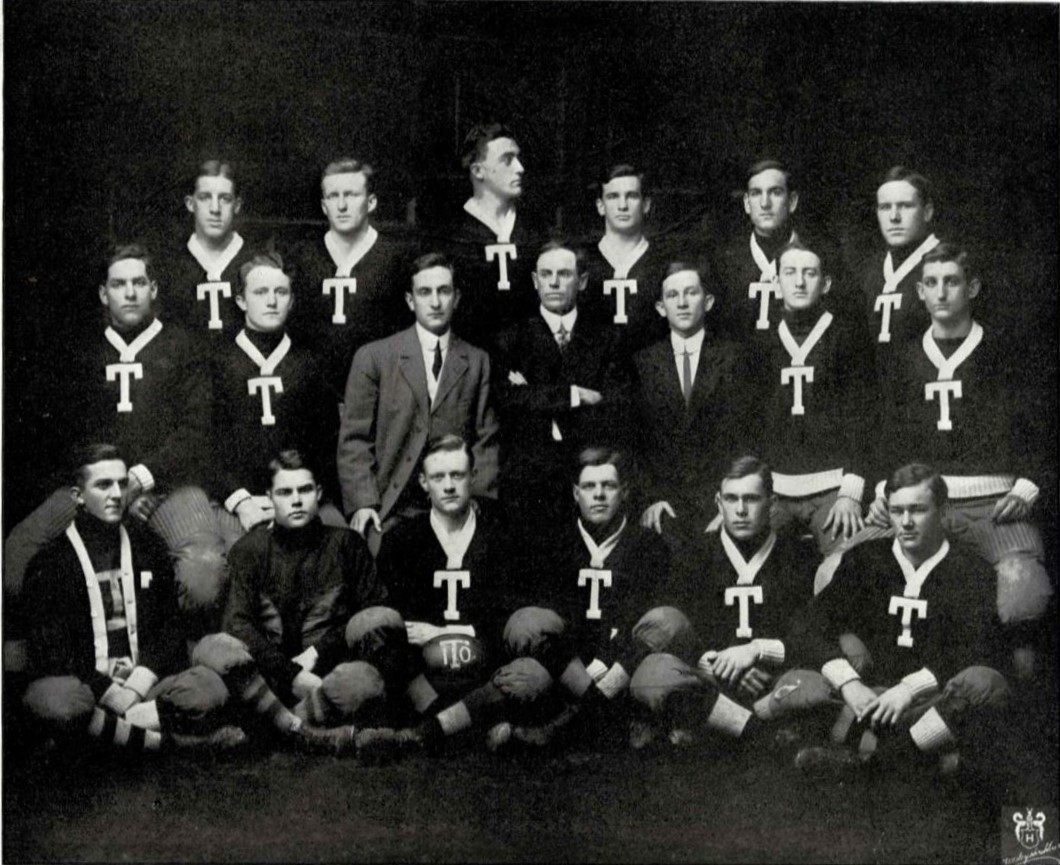
- Conference: Southern Intercollegiate Athletic Association
- Record: 5–3 (3–3 SIAA)
- Head coach: John Heisman (7th season)
- Offensive scheme: Jump shift
- Captain: Dean Hill
- Home stadium: Ponce de Leon Park

1910 Southern Intercollegiate Athletic Association football standings
	Conf.					Overall
Team	W		L		T	W		L		T
Vanderbilt +	5	–	0	–	0	8	–	0	–	1
Auburn +	5	–	0	–	0	6	–	1	–	0
Sewanee	3	–	1	–	0	8	–	2	–	0
Georgia	4	–	2	–	1	6	–	2	–	1
Ole Miss	2	–	1	–	0	7	–	1	–	0
Mississippi A&M	3	–	2	–	0	7	–	2	–	0
Mercer	3	–	2	–	0	6	–	3	–	0
Georgia Tech	3	–	3	–	0	5	–	3	–	0
Clemson	2	–	3	–	1	4	–	3	–	1
LSU	1	–	3	–	0	1	–	5	–	0
Tennessee	1	–	4	–	0	3	–	5	–	1
The Citadel	0	–	2	–	0	3	–	4	–	0
Alabama	0	–	4	–	0	4	–	4	–	0
Howard (AL)	0	–	5	–	0	1	–	8	–	0
+ – Conference co-champions

The 1910 Georgia Tech Yellow Jackets football team represented the Georgia School of Technology (now known as Georgia Institute of Technology or just Georgia Tech) as a member of the Southern Intercollegiate Athletic Association (SIAA) during the 1910 college football season. Led by John Heisman in his seventh season as head coach, the Yellow Jackets compiled an overall record of 5–3 with a mark of 3–3 in conference play.

== Schedule ==
Date	Opponent	Site	Result	Source
October 1	Gordon*	Piedmont Park; Atlanta, GA	W 57–0	
October 8	Chattanooga*	Piedmont Park; Atlanta, GA	W 18–0	
October 15	Mercer	Ponce de Leon Park; Atlanta, GA	W 46–0	
October 22	at Alabama	The Quad; Tuscaloosa, AL (rivalry)	W 36–0	
November 5	Auburn	Ponce de Leon Park; Atlanta, GA (rivalry)	L 0–16	
November 12	Vanderbilt	Ponce de Leon Park; Atlanta, GA (rivalry)	L 0–23	
November 19	Georgia	Ponce de Leon Park; Atlanta, GA (rivalry)	L 6–11	
November 24	Clemson	Ponce de Leon Park; Atlanta, GA (rivalry)	W 34–0	
*Non-conference game
