= Will Metzger =

American football player (1890–1951)

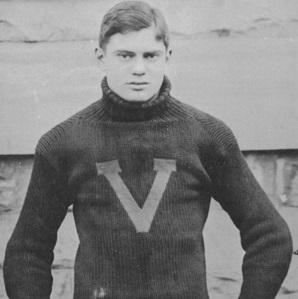

Profile
- Position: Guard/Fullback

Personal information
- Born: August 21, 1890; Nashville, Tennessee, U.S.
- Died: December 2, 1951 (aged 61); Memphis, Tennessee, U.S.
- Listed height: 6 ft 1 in (1.85 m)
- Listed weight: 175 lb (79 kg)

Career information
- College: Vanderbilt (1908–1911)

Awards and highlights
- SIAA championship (1910, 1911); All-Southern (1909, 1910, 1911); Third Team All-American (1910); AP Southeast All-Time team (1869–1919 era); 1912 All-time Vandy 1st team; 1934 All-time Vandy team

William Edgar "Frog" Metzger, Jr. (August 21, 1890 – December 2, 1951) was a college football player.

== Vanderbilt ==
Metzger was a prominent guard for the Vanderbilt Commodores of Vanderbilt University from 1908 to 1911. Metzger was Dan McGugin's first great lineman. Metzger was selected for an Associated Press Southeast Area All-Time football team 1869-1919 era. Metzger was chosen for an all-time Vandy team in 1912, as well as an All-time Vandy team published in Vanderbilt's yearbook in 1934. At Vanderbilt he was a member of the Kappa Alpha Order fraternity.

=== 1909 ===
Metzger was injured in the loss to Ohio State in 1909, breaking his leg just above the knee.

=== 1910 ===
The 1910 team which tied defending national champion Yale and allowed just 8 points and scored 165 was led by Metzger, a unanimous All-Southern player and third-team All-American as chosen by Walter Camp. He was the third ever player from the South to get on one of Camp's teams.
