= Locust Grove Institute =

- Locust Grove Institute Academic Building
- U.S. National Register of Historic Places
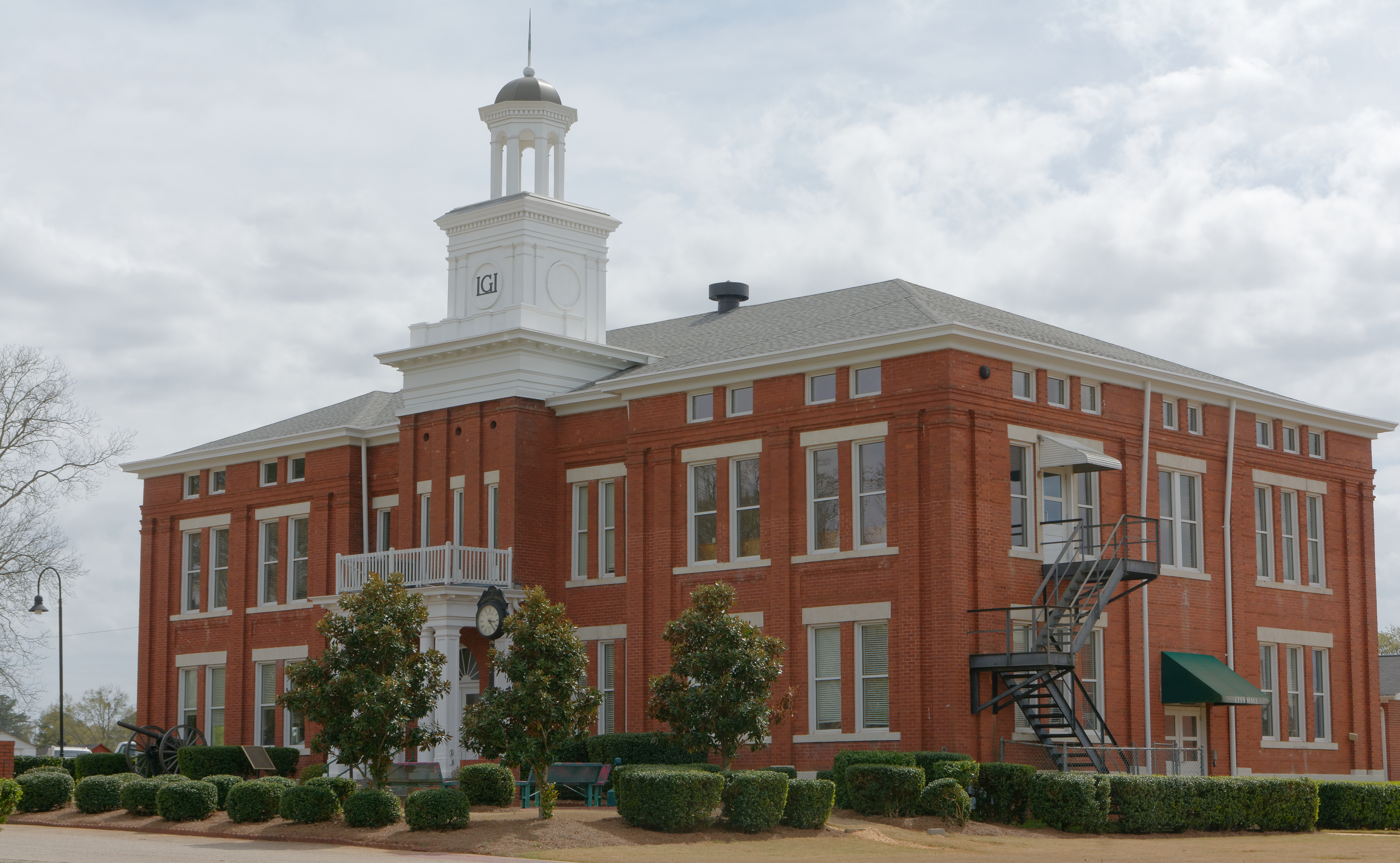
- Locust Grove Institute Academic Building, March 2018

- Location within Georgia Location within the United States
- Location: 3644 GA 42; Locust Grove, Georgia; United States
- Coordinates: 33.35203°N 84.11402°W
- Area: less than one acre
- Built: 1904
- Architect: James W. Golucke
- Architectural style: Classical Revival
- NRHP reference No.: 86002179
- Added to NRHP: September 4, 1986

Locust Grove Institute (LGI), now Locust Grove Memorial Complex, is a former college preparatory school in Locust Grove, Henry County, Georgia, United States, that is listed on the National Register of Historic Places (NRHP).

== Description ==
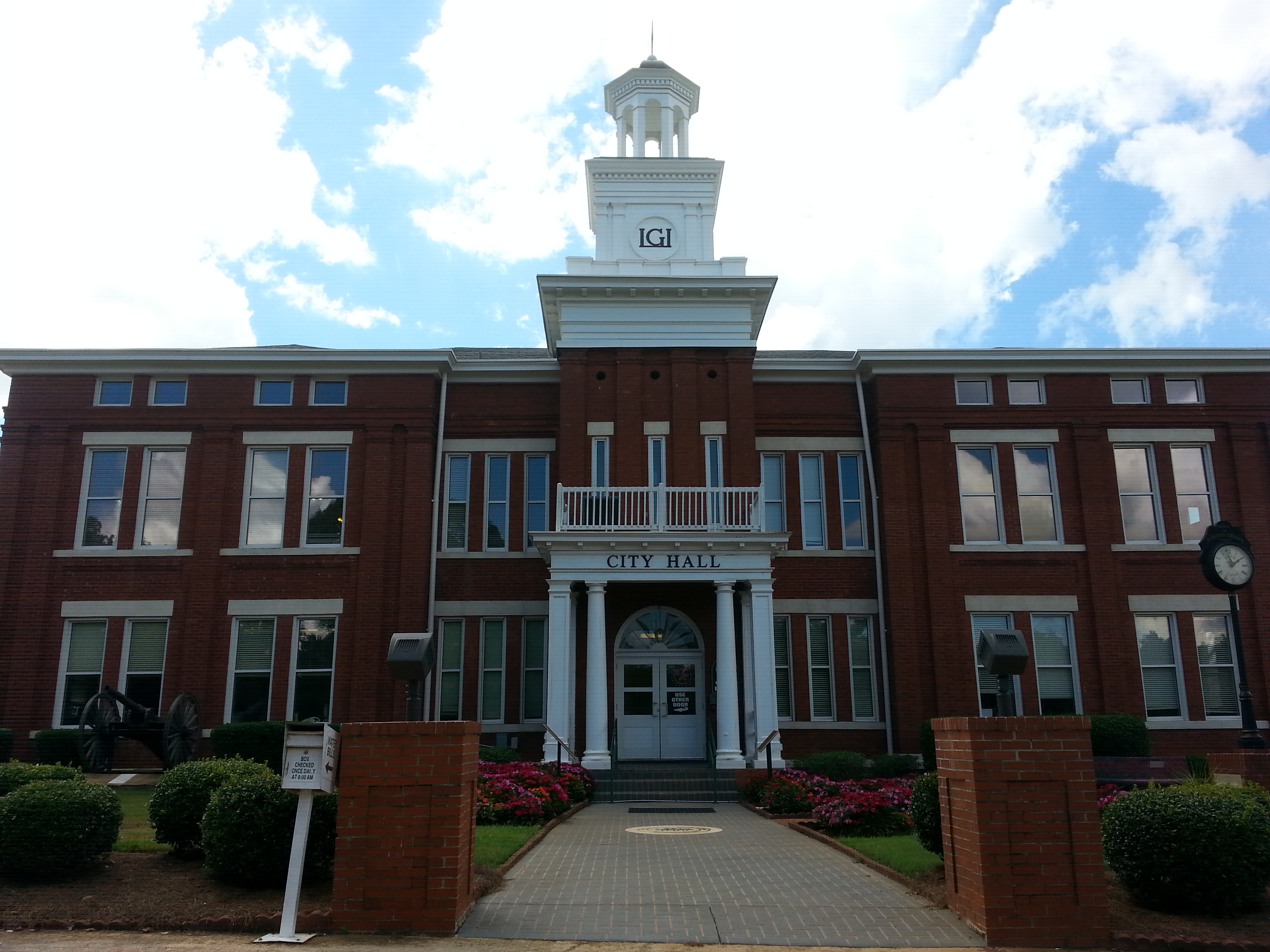
The Locust Grove Institute, September 2018

The main academic building now serves as a city hall. The school was founded by the Locust Grove Baptist Church and Mercer University and opened in 1894. The school building was constructed in 1904 for $14,000. Some of the school's wooden structures were destroyed by fire and were replaced by more substantial structures.

Operations and ownership changed with the onset of war, depression and competition from public schools. The school was empty for several years until 1936, when it became a public elementary school. After closing for several years it was used as an elementary school.

The city of Locust Grove purchased the school building in 1983 and it serves as city hall. The school's Academic Building was added to the National Register of Historic Places on September 4, 1986. It is also a contributing property to the NRHP It is also a contributing property to the NRHP's Locust Grove Historic District. The school is located at 3644 State Route 42 (also U.S. Route 23).

== See also ==
- National Register of Historic Places listings in Henry County, Georgia
