= Alabama State Fairgrounds =

Event venue in Alabama, United States

Coordinates: 33.4968°N 86.8714°W

Fair Park logo

The Alabama State Fairgrounds, also known as Fair Park, was the former home of the Alabama State Fair (until 2001) and the Birmingham International Raceway (until 2009), and is located in West Birmingham, Jefferson County, Alabama, United States. It is located adjacent to the Five Points West shopping area.

== History ==
The State Fair Arena and Exposition Building covers a combined total of 110,000 square feet (10,000 m^{2}). The 117-acre (0.47 km^{2}) fairgrounds were acquired by the City of Birmingham in 1947.

=== Alabama State Fair ===
For many years, the grounds were home to the Alabama State Fair. State fairs in Alabama date back to the days of the Antebellum South.

The statue of Vulcan, was originally displayed at the fairgrounds, either whole or in pieces during its construction; it is now a Birmingham landmark atop Red Mountain.

During the civil rights demonstrations of the 1960s, the fairgrounds were used by Police Commissioner Bull Connor to imprison arrested demonstrators when the city's jails were full. The fairgrounds have also been used by the Federal Emergency Management Agency for a disaster outreach event.

"Kiddieland," a small amusement park located at the Fairgrounds, was a popular attraction for many years but closed in the early 1990s. A "Mikado" steam locomotive, #4018, which once worked on the St. Louis-San Francisco Railway was displayed on the grounds from 1952 to 2009. It has since been relocated to Sloss Furnaces. Former fairgrounds manager Tom Drilias resigned in 1999 following a dispute over unpaid bills at another festival he ran, and was later the subject of an article in the Chicago Tribune reporting a series of legal problems.

The state fair discontinued regular use of the facility because of poor attendance and high crime in the adjacent neighborhood. The Alabama State Fair Authority went bankrupt, and was dissolved sometime around the year 2001. No state funded fair has been held on a regular basis since; an effort to revive the state fair again in 2008 took place at the Verizon Wireless Music Center in nearby Pelham. The "Alabama National Fair", sometimes also called the "Alabama State Fair" in Montgomery is unrelated.

In 2008, Universal Fairs, LLC purchased and trademarked the name Alabama State Fair. The Alabama State Fair ran as a yearly event from 2008 to 2011 and was held at the Oak Mountain Amphitheater in Pelham Formerly named Verizon Wireless Music Center. In 2019, the Alabama State Fair moved to the Birmingham Race Course due to its larger footprint and available parking, a former horse racing track on the east side of Birmingham that converted to greyhound racing, with live racing later discontinued and the track converted to betting on simulcast racing and also home to historical racing machines, similar to slot machines. The Alabama State Fair is still held annually at The Birmingham Race Course as of 2026.

=== Birmingham International Raceway ===
The old grandstand for the Alabama State Fair was later used as the Birmingham International Raceway (or BIR), it was designed initially as a home to both automobile and harness racing, as well as shows and concerts. Birmingham International Raceway (BIR) was located inside the gates of the Fairgrounds; it was demolished in January 2009, to make room for the construction of a natatorium and indoor track and field facility.
