= 1911 Tennessee Docs football team =

American college football season

1911 Tennessee Docs football
- Conference: Independent
- Record: 2–1–2
- Head coach: Bob Ramsey; Arthur Halle
- Home stadium: Red Elm Park

1911 Southern college football independents records
	Conf.			Overall
Team	W	L	T	W		L		T
Oklahoma		–		8	–	0	–	0
Florida		–		5	–	0	–	1
VMI		–		7	–	1	–	0
Texas A&M		–		6	–	1	–	0
Georgetown		–		7	–	1	–	1
Navy		–		6	–	0	–	3
North Carolina		–		6	–	1	–	1
VPI		–		6	–	1	–	2
Virginia		–		8	–	2	–	0
Louisiana Industrial		–		4	–	1	–	1
Marshall		–		4	–	1	–	1
Arkansas		–		6	–	2	–	1
Oklahoma A&M		–		5	–	2	–	0
Texas		–		5	–	2	–	0
Washington and Lee		–		4	–	2	–	2
West Virginia		–		6	–	3	–	0
Davidson		–		5	–	3	–	0
North Carolina A&M		–		5	–	3	–	0
Chattanooga		–		3	–	2	–	0
Catholic University		–		3	–	2	–	2
Maryland		–		4	–	4	–	2
Baylor		–		3	–	4	–	2
Wake Forest		–		3	–	5	–	0
Delaware		–		2	–	5	–	2
South Carolina		–		1	–	4	–	2
Southwestern Louisiana Industrial		–		1	–	4	–	1
Spring Hill		–		1	–	3	–	0
Southwest Texas State		–		1	–	3	–	0
Stetson		–		1	–	3	–	0
Birmingham		–		0	–	6	–	1
Middle Tennessee State Normal		–		0	–	1	–	0

The 1911 Tennessee Docs football team represented University of Tennessee College of Medicine as an independent during the 1911 college football season. Coach Bob Ramsey resigned mid-season and was replaced by Arthur Halle.

== Schedule ==
Date	Opponent	Site	Result	Source
October 9	at Ouachita	Arkadelphia, AR	W 5–0	
October 14	Christian Brothers	Red Elm Park; Memphis, TN	L 0–16	
November 3	Central High School	Red Elm Park; Memphis, TN	W 3–0	
November 10	Memphis University School	Red Elm Park; Memphis, TN	T 0–0	
November 25	Tennessee	Red Elm Park; Memphis, TN	T 0–0	
