= John Neff (American football) =

American football player, coach, college athletics administrator, and doctor

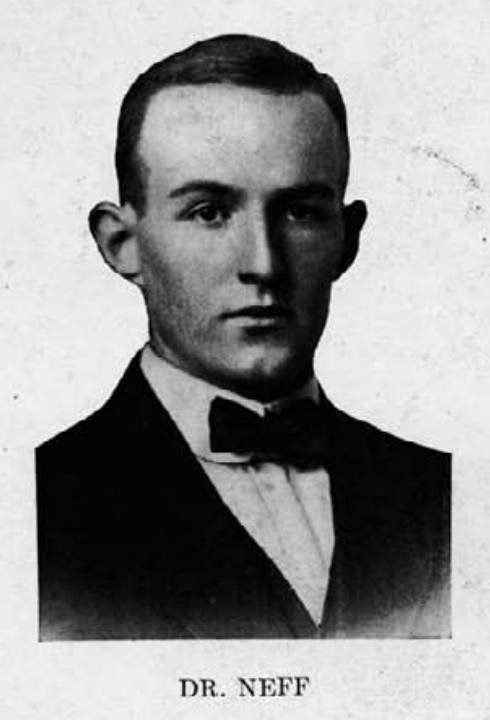
- Neff pictured in Garnet and Black 1912, South Carolina yearbook

Biographical details
- Born: September 12, 1887; Harrisonburg, Virginia, U.S.
- Died: November 8, 1938 (aged 51); University, Virginia, U.S.
- Education: University of Virginia (1908)

Playing career
- 1906–1908: Virginia

Coaching career (HC unless noted)
- 1909: Virginia
- 1910–1911: South Carolina
- 1919: Virginia (assistant)

Administrative career (AD unless noted)
- 1910–1911: South Carolina

Head coaching record
- Overall: 12–9–2

John Henry Neff Jr. (September 12, 1887 – November 8, 1938) was an American football player, coach, college athletics administrator, and doctor. In 1909, he served as the head football coach at the University of Virginia, where he compiled a 7–1 record, where his team outscored opponents 155–11. From 1910 to 1911, he coached at the University of South Carolina, where he compiled a 5–8–2 record. His overall record as a college football coach stands at 12–9–2. Neff was also the athletic director at South Carolina from 1910 to 1911.

While attending the University of Virginia, Neff captained the 1907 football team. After obtaining his M.D. in 1910, Neff worked at the University of Virginia Hospital first as an intern and surgeon and then later as professor of urology. He was also a member of the Southern Surgical Association, for which he served as vice president from 1934 until his death in 1938.

== Head coaching record ==
Year	Team	Overall	Conference	Standing	Bowl/playoffs
Virginia Orange and Blue (Independent) (1909)
1909	Virginia	7–1			
Virginia:		7–1			
South Carolina Gamecocks (Independent) (1910–1911)
1910	South Carolina	4–4			
1911	South Carolina	1–4–2			
South Carolina:		5–8–2			
Total:		12–9–2			
