= George E. Pyle =

American football coach and college athletics administrator

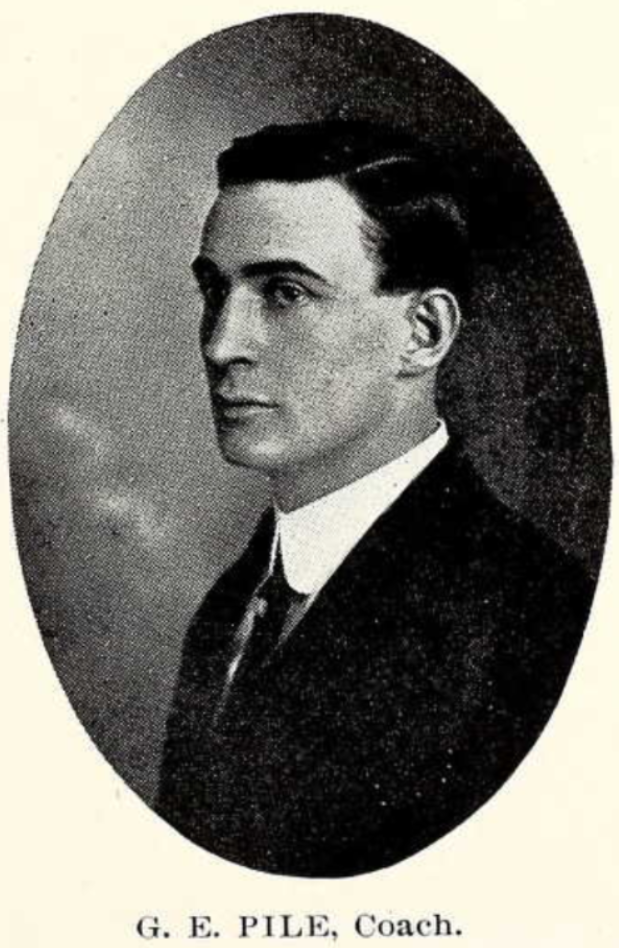
- G. E. Pyle from 1911 Seminole yearbook

Biographical details
- Born: August 27, 1885; Bristol, Tennessee, U.S.
- Died: August 1, 1949 (aged 63); Chattanooga, Tennessee, U.S.

Coaching career (HC unless noted)

Football
- 1904: Transylvania (assistant)
- 1906–1908: VMI (assistant)
- 1909–1913: Florida
- 1930: Transylvania

Basketball
- 1914–1917: West Virginia

Administrative career (AD unless noted)
- 1914–1917: West Virginia
- 1930: Transylvania

Head coaching record
- Overall: 27–12–5 (football); 29–25 (basketball)

George Edmundson Pyle (August 27, 1885 – August 23, 1949) was an American college football coach and college athletics administrator. He was the second head coach of the Florida Gators football team that represents the University of Florida. Pyle was the athletic director of West Virginia University from 1914 to 1917.

== Early life ==
Pyle was born on August 27, 1885, in Bristol, Tennessee.

== Coaching career ==
Pyle was director of physical culture of Transylvania University in 1904.

Pyle replaced Jack Forsythe as the Florida head football coach and held that position for five seasons, from 1909 to 1913. During that period, he accumulated a 26–7–3 record and a .764 winning percentage. In 1911, Pyle led Florida to its first and only undefeated season when the newly named Gators posted a 5–0–1 record.

In 1912, Florida posted a 5–2–1 record. After the season, the team participated in its first post-season game, the Bacardi Bowl held in Havana, Cuba. It was actually a two-game series against different Cuban athletic clubs. The first game was played on December 25 under the so-called "old rules" that existed before the American football reforms of 1906. In that game, Florida defeated the Vedado Tennis Club, 28–0. On December 30, Florida played the Cuban Athletic Club of Havana under the "new rules". According to one source, the game's referee was a former coach for the Cuban team, and the officiating was blatantly biased. After two Florida touchdowns were nullified by questionable officiating, Pyle protested a fifteen-yard penalty. When the referee offered a five-yard penalty instead, Pyle and his team left the game in protest. Another source states that the game ended late in the first quarter after a fight broke out between the teams; Florida accused the Cuban team of still playing under "the old rules". Regardless of the reason for the forfeiture, Pyle was arrested by the Cuban authorities. He was charged with violating a law that prohibited a game's suspension after money had been collected. After his trial was delayed, Pyle and the Gators left Cuba.

Pyle left the University of Florida after the 1913 season and became the athletic director for West Virginia University in Morgantown, West Virginia. Pyle served one season, in 1930, as the head football coach at Transylvania University in Lexington, Kentucky.

== Late life and death ==
After leaving college athletics, Pyle worked as an insurance agent in Bristol, Tennessee. He died in Chattanooga, Tennessee, on August 23, 1949, at the age of 63.

== Head coaching record ==
=== Football ===
Year	Team	Overall	Conference	Standing	Bowl/playoffs
Florida / Florida Gators (Independent) (1909–1911)
1909	Florida	6–1–1			
1910	Florida	6–1			
1911	Florida	5–0–1			
Florida Gators (Southern Intercollegiate Athletic Association) (1912–1913)
1912	Florida	5–2–1	1–2		W Bacardi
1913	Florida	4–3	2–3		
Florida:		26–7–3	3–5		
Transylvania Pioneers (Southern Intercollegiate Athletic Association) (1930)
1930	Transylvania	1–5–2	1–4–1	T–24th	
Transylvania:		1–5–2	1–4–1		
Total:		27–12–5			
