= Leslie Stauffer =

American football player and coach (1888–1963)

Biographical details
- Born: April 3, 1888; Bellevue, Ohio, U.S.
- Died: July 6, 1963 (aged 75); Birmingham, Michigan, U.S.

Playing career
- 1907–1908: Ohio Wesleyan

Coaching career (HC unless noted)
- 1910–1913: Chattanooga

Head coaching record
- Overall: 16–11–1

Leslie DeWitt Stauffer (April 3, 1888 – July 6, 1963) was an American football player and coach. He served as the head football coach at the University of Chattanooga from 1910 to 1913, compiling a record of 16–11–1. Stauffer died on July 6, 1963, at his home in Birmingham, Michigan.

== Head coaching record ==
Year	Team	Overall	Conference	Standing	Bowl/playoffs
Chattanooga Moccasins (Independent) (1910–1913)
1910	Chattanooga	5–2–1			
1911	Chattanooga	3–2			
1912	Chattanooga	4–4			
1913	Chattanooga	4–3			
Chattanooga:		16–11–1			
Total:		16–11–1			
