= Robert Winston (disambiguation) =

Robert Winston (born 1940) is a British doctor and scientist.

Robert Winston may also refer to:

- Robert Winston (coach) (1847–?), American football coach
- Robert Winston (jockey) (born 1979), Irish jockey
- Robert W. Winston (1860–1944), North Carolina state legislator, lawyer and author
- Bob Winston (American football) (1891–1970), American college football player and politician
- Bob Winston (jeweler) (1915–2003), American jeweler, sculptor, and educator
