= Earle Taylor =

American football player (1891–1955)

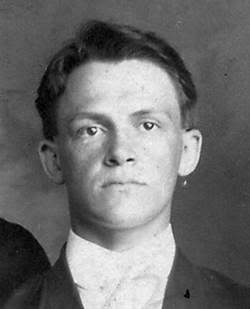

Profile
- Position: Halfback/Kicker

Personal information
- Born: February 2, 1891; Ashland, Kansas, U.S.
- Died: September 10, 1955 (aged 64); Gainesville, Florida, U.S.
- Listed weight: 165 lb (75 kg)

Career information
- College: Florida (1908–1912)

Awards and highlights
- University of Florida Athletic Hall of Fame; All-Time Florida Gators football team (1927); Only 5-year letterman at UF; Then-school record, field goals, season (8); Then-school record, field goals, career (16)

Earle Abbott "Dummy" Taylor (February 2, 1891 – September 10, 1955) was a college football player and oil company distributor. He was one of the first star athletes for the Florida Gators football team.

== Early life ==
Taylor was born in Ashland, Kansas, in 1891. By age nine, he had moved with his family to Gainesville, Florida. His father, Herbert Taylor, was employed as a bank cashier.

== University of Florida ==
Taylor played at the right halfback position for the Florida Gators football team of the University of Florida from 1908 to 1912; the only UF player to earn five football letters. Some describe him as the school's first star athlete. Taylor was described by contemporaneous newspaper accounts as a legendary broken field runner and a master of the hidden ball trick, who could drop-kick field goals "at seemingly impossible angles and distance." He is a member of the University of Florida Athletic Hall of Fame.

He was nominated though not selected for an Associated Press All-Time Southeast 1869-1919 era team. Taylor was picked as a halfback for an All-Time Florida Gators football team in 1927. In 1937, Lewis H. Tribble, dean of Stetson University, declared Taylor the greatest running back who ever played in the state of Florida.

=== 1908 to 1910 ===
In his first season of 1908, Taylor's extra point decided the win over Stetson, after a Charlie Bartleson touchdown run. Taylor kicked three field goals to beat the Jacksonville Olympics in 1909. He was captain of the 1910 team which suffered its only loss to Mercer.

=== 1911 ===
Taylor featured on the undefeated 1911 team captained by Neal Storter. The team tied the South Carolina Gamecocks, defeated The Citadel Bulldogs, Clemson and the College of Charleston, declared themselves to be the "champions of South Carolina," and finished their season 5–0–1—still the only undefeated football season in the Gators' history. Of the 84 points scored by Florida in 1911, Taylor scored 49: 25 points on the ground and points-after and 24 on field goals. He also threw two touchdown passes. His 8 field goals were a then school record, standing until 1974.

Taylor scored in the tie with South Carolina. and against Clemson he picked up a fumble and ran 45 yards for a touchdown, and then kicked the extra point to win. He kicked three field goals to beat Columbia College of Lake City 9–0.

"It was on the South Carolina trip that the Florida team was dubbed the ‘Alligators,’ and the battle that took place . . .between the Clemson Tigers and the Florida Alligators is one long to be remembered!" declared the Florida Pennant.

=== 1912 ===
He closed his career on the 1912 team which played in the Bacardi Bowl. Earlier in the season, the Gators got their first ever win over South Carolina. Taylor made a field goal. After Taylor missed a drop kick, Carolina fumbled, and Florida's Hoyle Pounds recovered for a touchdown. The 23–7 defeat of Stetson was considered Dummy Taylor's greatest game.

== Later life ==
Taylor continued to reside in Gainesville, Florida. As of June 1917, he was employed as a master mechanic for the Florida Industrial Corporation in Gainesville. In 1920, he was living in Gainesville and employed as an engineer. In 1930, he was living in Gainesville with his wife, Leonilla and their six-year-old son, Earl, Jr., and he was employed as a wholesale dealer in gas and oil. In 1940, he remained Gainesville with his wife and son and was employed as a consignee for the Texas Oil Company. He died in Gainesville in 1955 after suffering a heart attack at age 64.

== See also ==
- List of University of Florida Athletic Hall of Fame members

== Bibliography ==
- McEwen, Tom (1974). The Gators: A Story of Florida Football. Huntsville, Alabama: The Strode Publishers. ISBN 0-87397-025-X.
