= Kemper Yancey =

American football player and coach (1887–1957)

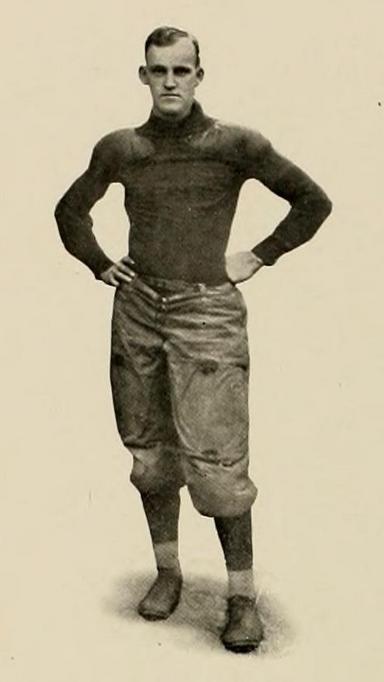
- Yancey pictured in Kaleidoscope 1911, Hampden-Sydney yearbook

Biographical details
- Born: June 2, 1887; Harrisonburg, Virginia, U.S.
- Died: February 17, 1957 (aged 69); Richmond, Virginia, U.S.

Playing career
- 1907–1909: Virginia
- Position: Fullback

Coaching career (HC unless noted)
- 1910: Hampden–Sydney
- 1911: Virginia

Head coaching record
- Overall: 12–5

Kemper Winsborough Yancey (June 2, 1887 – February 17, 1957) was an American college football player and coach. He served as head football coach at Hampden–Sydney College in 1910 and at the University of Virginia in 1911, compiling a career head coaching record of 12–5. Yancey was born on June 2, 1887, in Harrisonburg, Virginia. He later worked for the United States Department of Labor. He died on February 17, 1957, in Richmond, Virginia.

== Head coaching record ==
Year	Team	Overall	Conference	Standing	Bowl/playoffs
Hampden–Sydney Tigers (Eastern Virginia Intercollegiate Athletic Association) (1910)
1910	Hampden–Sydney	4–3	2–1	2nd	
Hampden–Sydney:		4–3	2–1		
Virginia Orange and Blue (South Atlantic Intercollegiate Athletic Association) (1911)
1911	Virginia	8–2	2–1		
Virginia:		8–2	2–1		
Total:		12–5			
