= Lew Riess =

American sports coach and college athletics administrator

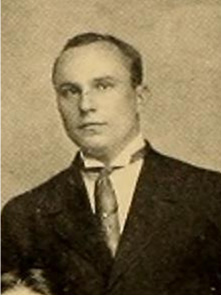
- Riess cropped from the 1909 Hampden–Sydney football team photo

Biographical details
- Born: October 19, 1887; Philadelphia, Pennsylvania, U.S.
- Died: January 4, 1946 (aged 58); Antwerp, Belgium
- Education: Swarthmore College

Coaching career (HC unless noted)

Football
- 1908–1909: Hampden–Sydney
- 1911: VPI
- 1912—1917: Randolph–Macon

Basketball
- 1908–1912: Hampden–Sydney

Baseball
- 1912: VPI

Administrative career (AD unless noted)
- 1910: VPI
- c. 1915: Randolph–Macon

Head coaching record
- Overall: 33–39–4 (football); 3–6 (basketball); 9–9 (baseball)

Accomplishments and honors

Championships
- Football; 2 EVIAA (1908, 1912)

Lewis William Riess (October 19, 1887 – January 4, 1946) was an American football, basketball, and baseball coach and college athletics administrator. He served as the head football coach at Hampden–Sydney College from 1908 to 1910 and at Virginia Agricultural and Mechanical College and Polytechnic Institute (VPI) — now known as Virginia Tech — in 1911, and Randolph–Macon College from 1912 to 1917, compiling a career college football record of 33–39–4. Riess was also the head basketball coach at Hampden–Sydney from 1908 to 1912, amassing a record of 3–6, and the head baseball coach at VPI in 1912, tallying a mark of 9–9.

Riess left Randolph–Macon in December 1917 to become the athletic director of a United States Army aviation camp in Jacksonville, Florida. He served as the activity secretary of the Army-Navy YMCA in Honolulu from 1938 to 1941. He died on January 4, 1946, in Belgium.

== Head coaching record ==
=== Football ===
Year	Team	Overall	Conference	Standing	Bowl/playoffs
Hampden–Sydney Tigers (Eastern Virginia Intercollegiate Athletic Association) (1908–1909)
1908	Hampden–Sydney	5–4	2–1	T–1st	
1909	Hampden–Sydney	3–4	1–2	T–3rd	
Hampden–Sydney:		8–8	3–3		
VPI (Independent) (1911)
1911	VPI	6–1–2			
VPI:		6–1–2			
Randolph–Macon Yellow Jackets (Eastern Virginia Intercollegiate Athletic Association) (1912–1917)
1912	Randolph–Macon	5–2	3–0	1st	
1913	Randolph–Macon	4–4	1–2	3rd	
1914	Randolph–Macon	5–5	3–3	T–2nd	
1915	Randolph–Macon	4–5–1	3–2–1	T–2nd	
1916	Randolph–Macon	1–7–1	1–4–1	T–3rd	
1917	Randolph–Macon	0–7	0–6	4th	
Randolph–Macon:		19–30–2	11–17–2		
Total:		33–39–4			
National championship Conference title Conference division title or championship game berth
