= Frank Thompson (coach) =

American athlete and coach (1886–1918)

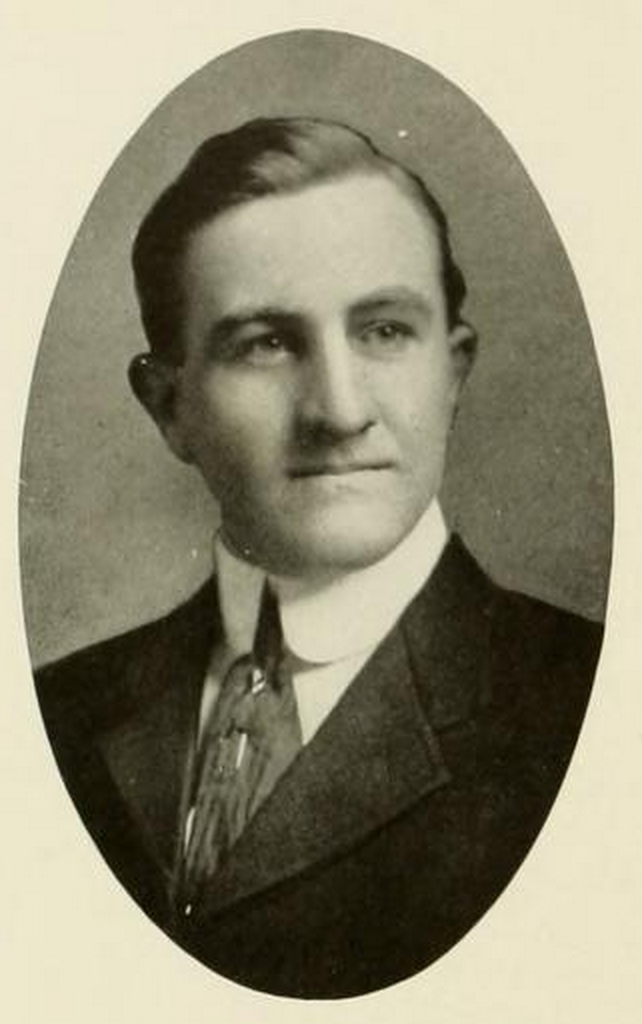
- Thompson pictured in The Agromeck 1909, North Carolina A&M yearbook

Biographical details
- Born: April 21, 1886; Raleigh, North Carolina, U.S.
- Died: September 13, 1918 (aged 32); Saint-Mihiel, France

Playing career

Football
- 1905–1908: North Carolina A&M

Baseball
- 1906–1908: North Carolina A&M
- Positions: Fullback (football); Catcher (baseball)

Coaching career (HC unless noted)

Football
- 1911–1913: Wake Forest

Baseball
- 1908–1911: North Carolina A&M
- 1913–1914: Wake Forest

Head coaching record
- Overall: 5–19 (football)

Frank Martin Thompson (April 21, 1886 – September 13, 1918) was an American college football and college baseball player and coach. He served as the head football coach at Wake Forest College from 1911 to 1913, compiling a record of 5–19. Thompson was also the head baseball coach at North Carolina College of Agriculture and Mechanic Arts—now North Carolina State University—from 1908 to 1911 and at Wake Forest from 1913 to 1914. A native of Raleigh, North Carolina, Thompson graduated from North Carolina A&M in 1909. He played on the school's varsity football team from 1905 to 1908 and the varsity baseball team from 1906 to 1908. Martin served as a lieutenant in 15th Machine Gun Battalion during World War I. He was killed in action on September 13, 1918, at the Battle of Saint-Mihiel. Frank Thompson Hall at North Carolina State University was named in his honor.

== Head coaching record ==
=== Football ===
Year	Team	Overall	Conference	Standing	Bowl/playoffs
Wake Forest Baptists (Independent) (1911–1913)
1911	Wake Forest	3–5			
1912	Wake Forest	2–6			
1913	Wake Forest	0–8			
Wake Forest:		5–19			
Total:		5–19			
