= Dan Estes =

American sports coach (1888–1944)

Biographical details
- Born: January 1, 1888; Carrollton, Arkansas, U.S.
- Died: November 13, 1944 (aged 56) near Mayflower, Arkansas, U.S.

Playing career

Football
- 1908–1913: Arkansas

Coaching career (HC unless noted)

Football
- 1915–1916: Arkansas State Normal
- 1917: Fourth District Agricultural
- 1919–1932: Arkansas State Normal/Teachers

Basketball
- 1920–1929: Arkansas State Normal/Teachers

Baseball
- 1916–1917: Arkansas State Normal
- 1919–1933: Arkansas State Normal/Teachers
- 1935: Arkansas State Teachers
- 1937: Arkansas State Teachers

Head coaching record
- Overall: 48–65–11 (football)

Guy Dan "Big Dan" Estes (January 1, 1888 – November 13, 1944) was an American football, basketball, and baseball coach. He served as the head football coach at Arkansas State Normal School—renamed Arkansas State Teachers College in 1925 and now known as the University of Central Arkansas—from 1915 to 1916 and again from 1919 to 1932. He also coached the school's basketball program from 1920 to 1929. Estes also served as coach of the University of Arkansas at Monticello football team in 1917.

Estes was an alumnus of the University of Arkansas, where he played football for coach Hugo Bezdek, winning four letters during his tenure. He captained the 1911 team.

He died of a heart attack while duck hunting in 1944.
