= 1911 North Carolina Tar Heels football team =

American college football season

1911 North Carolina Tar Heels football
- Conference: Independent
- Record: 6–1–1
- Head coach: Branch Bocock (1st season)
- Captain: Bob Winston
- Home stadium: Campus Athletic Field (II)

1911 Southern college football independents records
	Conf.			Overall
Team	W	L	T	W		L		T
Oklahoma		–		8	–	0	–	0
Florida		–		5	–	0	–	1
VMI		–		7	–	1	–	0
Texas A&M		–		6	–	1	–	0
Georgetown		–		7	–	1	–	1
Navy		–		6	–	0	–	3
North Carolina		–		6	–	1	–	1
VPI		–		6	–	1	–	2
Virginia		–		8	–	2	–	0
Louisiana Industrial		–		4	–	1	–	1
Marshall		–		4	–	1	–	1
Arkansas		–		6	–	2	–	1
Oklahoma A&M		–		5	–	2	–	0
Texas		–		5	–	2	–	0
Washington and Lee		–		4	–	2	–	2
West Virginia		–		6	–	3	–	0
Davidson		–		5	–	3	–	0
North Carolina A&M		–		5	–	3	–	0
Chattanooga		–		3	–	2	–	0
Catholic University		–		3	–	2	–	2
Maryland		–		4	–	4	–	2
Baylor		–		3	–	4	–	2
Wake Forest		–		3	–	5	–	0
Delaware		–		2	–	5	–	2
South Carolina		–		1	–	4	–	2
Southwestern Louisiana Industrial		–		1	–	4	–	1
Spring Hill		–		1	–	3	–	0
Southwest Texas State		–		1	–	3	–	0
Stetson		–		1	–	3	–	0
Birmingham		–		0	–	6	–	1
Middle Tennessee State Normal		–		0	–	1	–	0

The 1911 North Carolina Tar Heels football team represented the University of North Carolina in the 1911 college football season. The team captain of the 1911 season was Bob Winston.

== Schedule ==
Date	Time	Opponent	Site	Result	Attendance	Source
October 7		Wake Forest	Campus Athletic Field (II); Chapel Hill, NC (rivalry)	W 12–3		
October 14		Robert Bingham School	Campus Athletic Field (II); Chapel Hill, NC	W 12–0		
October 21	3:30 p.m.	vs. Davidson	Latta Park; Charlotte, NC	W 5–0		
October 28		USS Franklin	Campus Athletic Field (II); Chapel Hill, NC	W 12–0		
November 4	3:00 p.m.	vs. VPI	Broad Street Park (I); Richmond, VA	T 0–0	2,000	
November 11		South Carolina	Campus Athletic Field (II); Chapel Hill, NC (rivalry)	W 21–0		
November 18		vs. Washington and Lee	Lafayette Field; Norfolk, VA	W 4–0		
November 30	2:30 p.m.	vs. Virginia	Broad Street Park (I); Richmond, VA (South's Oldest Rivalry)	L 0–28	12,000	
