= 1911 VPI football team =

American college football season

1911 VPI football
- Conference: Independent
- Record: 6–1–2
- Head coach: Lew Riess (1st season)
- Captain: Aubrey Gravatt Gibbs
- Home stadium: Miles Field

1911 Southern college football independents records
	Conf.			Overall
Team	W	L	T	W		L		T
Oklahoma		–		8	–	0	–	0
Florida		–		5	–	0	–	1
VMI		–		7	–	1	–	0
Texas A&M		–		6	–	1	–	0
Georgetown		–		7	–	1	–	1
Navy		–		6	–	0	–	3
North Carolina		–		6	–	1	–	1
VPI		–		6	–	1	–	2
Virginia		–		8	–	2	–	0
Louisiana Industrial		–		4	–	1	–	1
Marshall		–		4	–	1	–	1
Arkansas		–		6	–	2	–	1
Oklahoma A&M		–		5	–	2	–	0
Texas		–		5	–	2	–	0
Washington and Lee		–		4	–	2	–	2
West Virginia		–		6	–	3	–	0
Davidson		–		5	–	3	–	0
North Carolina A&M		–		5	–	3	–	0
Chattanooga		–		3	–	2	–	0
Catholic University		–		3	–	2	–	2
Maryland		–		4	–	4	–	2
Baylor		–		3	–	4	–	2
Wake Forest		–		3	–	5	–	0
Delaware		–		2	–	5	–	2
South Carolina		–		1	–	4	–	2
Southwestern Louisiana Industrial		–		1	–	4	–	1
Spring Hill		–		1	–	3	–	0
Southwest Texas State		–		1	–	3	–	0
Stetson		–		1	–	3	–	0
Birmingham		–		0	–	6	–	1
Middle Tennessee State Normal		–		0	–	1	–	0

The 1911 VPI football team represented Virginia Agricultural and Mechanical College and Polytechnic Institute in the 1911 college football season. The team was led by their head coach Lew Riess and finished with a record of six wins, one loss, and two ties (6–1–2).

== Schedule ==
Date	Time	Opponent	Site	Result	Attendance	Source
September 30		Hampden–Sydney	Miles Field; Blacksburg, VA	W 16–0		
October 6	3:15 p.m.	vs. University of Maryland, Baltimore	Lafayette Field; Norfolk, VA	W 12–0		
October 14	3:00 p.m.	at Yale	Yale Field; New Haven, CT	L 0–33		
October 21		Roanoke	Miles Field; Blacksburg, VA	W 93–0		
October 28	3:00 p.m.	vs. Washington and Lee	Fair Grounds; Roanoke, VA	T 5–5	3,000	
November 4	3:00 p.m.	vs. North Carolina	Broad Street Park; Richmond, VA	T 0–0	2,000	
November 11		Tennessee	Miles Field; Blacksburg, VA	W 36–11		
November 18		Morris Harvey	Miles Field; Blacksburg, VA	W 10–3		
November 30		vs. North Carolina A&M	Lafayette Field; Norfolk, VA	W 3–0	6,000	

== Before the season ==
The 1910 VPI football team compiled a 6–2 record and were led by Branch Bocock in his second season as head coach.

== Game summaries ==
=== Hampden–Sydney ===
Hampden–Sydney vs. VPI

Team	1	2	Total
HS	0	0	0
• VPI	5	11	16

- Date: September 30, 1911
- Location: Miles Field
  Blacksburg, VA
- Referee: Joseph Ware

VPI's first game of the season was a victory over Hampden–Sydney at Miles Field.

The starting lineup for VPI was: Hodgson (left end), Burruss (left tackle), Pick (left guard), Gibbs (center), Rogers (right guard), Schultz (right tackle), Lefebre (right end), Vaughan (quarterback), F. Legge (left halfback), W. Legge (right halfback), Roberts (fullback).

The starting lineup for Hampden–Sydney was: W. W. Arbuckle (left end), Thomas Atkinson (left tackle), Charles Walker (left guard), Marvin Bowling (center), Robert Guthrie (right guard), Loyal Benedict (right tackle), F. W. Payne (right end), Kirkland Saunders (quarterback), George Jones (left halfback), Charles Lewis (right halfback), Howard Blanton (fullback).

=== Maryland, Baltimore ===
Maryland vs. VPI

Team	1	2	3	4	Total
MD	0	0	0	0	0
• VPI	6	0	0	6	12

- Date: October 6, 1911
- Location: Lafayette Field
  Norfolk, VA
- Game start: 3:15 p.m.
- Referee: Vivian Dodgson

After their victory over Hampden–Sydney, VPI played the University of Maryland, Baltimore at Lafayette Field in Norfolk, Virginia.

The starting lineup for VPI was: Hodgson (left end), Burruss (left tackle), Pick (left guard), Gibbs (center), Evans (right guard), Schultz (right tackle), Lefebre (right end), Vaughan (quarterback), Rogers (left halfback), Derby (right halfback), Roberts (fullback). The substitutes were: Hughes, F. Legge, W. Legge and Wyatt.

The starting lineup for University of Maryland, Baltimore was: C. Collinson (left end), Merrill (left tackle), Johnson (left guard), Oehrl (center), Chaifey (right guard), J. Collinson (right tackle), Stevens (right end), Butler (quarterback), Ruhl (left halfback), Melville (right halfback), Brown (fullback). The substitutes were: Nelson, Raimey and W. Ruhl.

=== Yale ===
VPI at Yale

Team	1	2	3	4	Total
VPI	0	0	0	0	0
• Yale	15	12	6	0	33

- Date: October 14, 1911
- Location: Yale Field
  New Haven, CT
- Game start: 3:00 p.m.
- Referee: Dave Fultz

The starting lineup for VPI was: Hodgson (left end), Burruss (left tackle), Evans (left guard), Gibbs (center), Pick (right guard), Schultz (right tackle), Lefebre (right end), Bernier (quarterback), F. Legge (left halfback), Derby (right halfback), Roberts (fullback). The substitutes were: Hughes, W. Legge, Rogers, Vaughan and Wyatt.

The starting lineup for Yale was: Benjamin Avery (left end), James Scully (left tackle), Pomeroy Francis (left guard), Hank Ketcham (center), Elmer McDevitt (right guard), Henry Perry (right tackle), William Howe (right end), Art Howe (quarterback), James Reilly (left halfback), Jesse Spalding (right halfback), Anderson (fullback). The substitutes were: Walter C. Camp, Clarence Childs, Church, Davis, Foss, Edgar Freeman, Robert Loree, Henry Marting, Henry Merritt, Parker and William Warren.

=== Cancelled Game with Western Maryland ===
VPI was scheduled to play Western Maryland College on October 21, but Western Maryland cancelled and VPI played Roanoke.

=== Washington and Lee ===
Washington & Lee vs. VPI

Team	1	2	3	4	Total
W&L	0	0	0	5	5
VPI	0	5	0	0	5

- Date: October 28, 1911
- Location: Fair Grounds
  Roanoke, VA
- Game start: 3:00 p.m.
- Game attendance: 3,000
- Game weather: "ideal"
- Referee: Jack Gass

The starting lineup for VPI was: Hodgson (left end), Schultz (left tackle), Pick (left guard), Gibbs (center), Evans (right guard), Burruss (right tackle), Lefebre (right end), Bernier (quarterback), Derby (left halfback), F. Legge (right halfback), Macon (fullback). The substitutes were: W. Legge and Wyatt.

The starting lineup for Washington and Lee was: Kelly Francis (left end), James Miller (left tackle), H. Southerland (left guard), Carl Moore (center), Paul Rogers (right guard), Buck Miles (right tackle), Hurd (right end), John Slater (quarterback), Ralph Malcolm (left halfback), David Bone (right halfback), Edmond Burk (fullback). The substitutes were: Raymond Beuhring, William Brown, C. T. Lile, W. C. Raftery, Mark Stewart, H. F. Tindal, Roland Waddill and F. B. Webster.

=== North Carolina ===
North Carolina vs. VPI

Team	1	2	3	4	Total
UNC	0	0	0	0	0
VPI	0	0	0	0	0

- Date: November 4, 1911
- Location: Broad Street Park
  Richmond, VA
- Game start: 3:00 p.m.
- Game attendance: 2,000
- Game weather: "cold, drizzling downpour"
- Referee: Jack Gass

The starting lineup for VPI was: Hodgson (left end), Burruss (left tackle), Pick (left guard), Gibbs (center), Evans (right guard), Schultz (right tackle), Lefebre (right end), Vaughan (quarterback), Legge (left halfback), Derby (right halfback), Macon (fullback). The substitutes were: Hughes.

The starting lineup for North Carolina was: Blake Applewhite (left end), Walter Small (left tackle), Archibald Deans (left guard), Marvin Ritch (center), James Orr (right guard), Lonnie Abernethy (right tackle), Robert Strange (right end), William Tillett (quarterback), Seigler (left halfback), Bob Winston (right halfback), William Coffin (fullback). The substitutes were: Joseph Chambers and Nicholson.

=== Tennessee ===
The starting lineup for VPI was: Hodgson (left end), Burruss (left tackle), Pick (left guard), Gibbs (center), Evans (right guard), Schultz (right tackle), Lefebre (right end), Bernier (quarterback), F. Legge (left halfback), Derby (right halfback), W. Legge (fullback).

The starting lineup for Tennessee was: Alonzo Carroll (left end), Sam Hayley (left tackle), R. V. Kerr (left guard), Joseph Gause (center), Roy McGuire (right guard), Farmer Kelly (right tackle), M. McGuire (right end), Rufus Branch (quarterback), Rus Lindsay (left halfback), C. H. Fonde (right halfback), Frank Tompkins (fullback).

=== Morris Harvey ===
Morris Harvey vs. VPI

Team	1	2	3	4	Total
MH	3	0	0	0	3
• VPI	0	0	10	0	10

- Date: November 18, 1911
- Location: Miles Field
  Blacksburg, VA
- Game weather: "high wind"
- Referee: Joseph Ware

The starting lineup for VPI was: Hodgson (left end), Moore (left tackle), Wyatt (left guard), Gibbs (center), Evans (right guard), Schultz (right tackle), Rogers (right end), Bernier (quarterback), Legge (left halfback), Vawter (right halfback), Gardner (fullback).

The starting lineup for Morris Harvey was: Fulton (left end), Beck (left tackle), Dyke (left guard), Adamson (center), Taylor (right guard), Huyler (right tackle), Frith (right end), Shelton (quarterback), Hager (left halfback), Raymond Ayres (right halfback), Smith (fullback).

=== North Carolina A&M ===
North Carolina A&M vs. VPI

Team	1	2	3	4	Total
NC A&M	0	0	0	0	0
• VPI	0	0	0	3	3

- Date: November 30, 1911
- Location: Lafayette Field
  Norfolk, VA
- Game attendance: 6,000
- Referee: Harton (Princeton)

The starting lineup for VPI was: Hodgson (left end), Burruss (left tackle), Pick (left guard), Gibbs (center), Evans (right guard), Schultz (right tackle), Lefebre (right end), Bernier (quarterback), Derby (left halfback), F. Legge (right halfback), Macon (fullback). The substitutes were: W. Legge and Rogers.

The starting lineup for North Carolina A&M was: A. J. Phillips (left end), W. T. Hurtt (left tackle), S. B. Sykes (left guard), C. D. McIver (center), J. L. Dunn (right guard), D. B. Floyd (right tackle), David Seifert (right end), Tal Stafford (quarterback), D. A. Robertson (left halfback), H. M. Cool (right halfback), Nathan Hargrove (fullback).

== Players ==
=== Roster ===
VPI 1911 roster
Quarterback: Charles A. Bernier; Guards: Peyton Evans; Lewis A. Pick; Tackles: William Henry Burruss; Werner Joseph Schultz; Center: Aubrey Gibbs (Capt.)	Ends: Asbury Nathaniel Hodgson; Gordon Lefebre; Halfbacks: Claude Palmer Derby; Frederick Hughes Legge; Fullback: Robert C. Macon	Substitutes: Gardner; Houston Boyd Hughes; Withrow Reynolds Legge; Arthur Penick Moore; Roberts; James Rogers; Harry Vaughan; John Vawter; Fred Tate Wyatt

=== Monogram Club members ===
Sixteen players received monograms for their participation on the 1911 VPI team.

Player	Hometown	Notes
Charles A. Bernier	Laconia, New Hampshire	Head football coach at Hampden–Sydney College from 1912 to 1916 and again from 1923 to 1938 and at VPI from 1917 to 1919, compiling a career college football record of 87–106–18.
William Henry Burruss	Lynch Station, Virginia	
Claude Palmer Derby	Norfolk, Virginia	
Peyton Evans	Amherst, Virginia	Head football coach at the University of Virginia in 1916.
Aubrey Gravatt Gibbs	Port Royal, Virginia	
Asbury Nathaniel Hodgson	East Falls Church, Virginia	
Gordon Lefebre	Richmond, Virginia	
Frederick Hughes Legge	Washington, DC	
Withrow Reynolds Legge	Washington, DC	
Robert C. Macon	Washington, DC	Senior United States Army officer who commanded the 7th Infantry Regiment and the 83rd Infantry Division during World War II in Western Europe and later served as military attaché in Moscow.
Lewis A. Pick	Brookneal, Virginia	Served as Chief of Engineers in the United States Army. Pick was awarded the Distinguished Service Medal with Oak Leaf Cluster. Pick City, North Dakota, located by the Garrison Dam on the Missouri River was founded in 1946 and named for him. Pickstown, South Dakota, located by the Fort Randall Dam was also named for him.
James Booth Rogers	Lovingston, Virginia	
Werner Joseph Schultz	Roanoke, Virginia	
Harry Briggs Vaughan	Norfolk, Virginia	
John Rudisil Vawter	Ansted, West Virginia	
Fred Tate Wyatt		

== Coaching and training staff ==
- Head coach: Lew Riess
- Manager: George Glenn Garrison
