= 1911 Florida Gators football team =

American college football season

1911 Florida Gators football
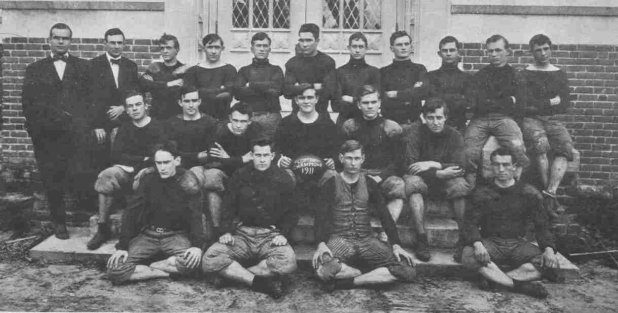
- Conference: Independent
- Record: 5–0–1
- Head coach: George E. Pyle (3rd season)
- Captain: Neal Storter
- Home stadium: University Athletic Field

1911 Southern college football independents records
	Conf.			Overall
Team	W	L	T	W		L		T
Oklahoma		–		8	–	0	–	0
Florida		–		5	–	0	–	1
VMI		–		7	–	1	–	0
Texas A&M		–		6	–	1	–	0
Georgetown		–		7	–	1	–	1
Navy		–		6	–	0	–	3
North Carolina		–		6	–	1	–	1
VPI		–		6	–	1	–	2
Virginia		–		8	–	2	–	0
Louisiana Industrial		–		4	–	1	–	1
Marshall		–		4	–	1	–	1
Arkansas		–		6	–	2	–	1
Oklahoma A&M		–		5	–	2	–	0
Texas		–		5	–	2	–	0
Washington and Lee		–		4	–	2	–	2
West Virginia		–		6	–	3	–	0
Davidson		–		5	–	3	–	0
North Carolina A&M		–		5	–	3	–	0
Chattanooga		–		3	–	2	–	0
Catholic University		–		3	–	2	–	2
Maryland		–		4	–	4	–	2
Baylor		–		3	–	4	–	2
Wake Forest		–		3	–	5	–	0
Delaware		–		2	–	5	–	2
South Carolina		–		1	–	4	–	2
Southwestern Louisiana Industrial		–		1	–	4	–	1
Spring Hill		–		1	–	3	–	0
Southwest Texas State		–		1	–	3	–	0
Stetson		–		1	–	3	–	0
Birmingham		–		0	–	6	–	1
Middle Tennessee State Normal		–		0	–	1	–	0

The 1911 Florida Gators football team represented the University of Florida during the 1911 college football season. It was the sixth season of varsity football at the school and George Pyle's third as head coach of the Florida Gators football team. Pyle's squad finished 5–0–1 for the first undefeated season in program history. The six game schedule saw Florida play four opponents from South Carolina, including back to back road games against the Clemson Tigers and South Carolina Gamecocks. The Gators earned a tie with the Tigers and a win over the Gamecocks, a victory that has been called the program's first road win against a quality opponent.

Besides the historically successful record, the 1911 season saw two significant milestones for the program. For one, the school officially adopted "Gators" as its mascot, initially for the football team but soon applying to all sports. Earlier Florida squads had been referred to as "the Orange and Blue" or simply "Florida".

1911 also saw the football debut of the young school's first on-campus sports facility at University Athletic Field, which consisted of low bleachers on a cleared field along University Avenue, just west of the existing campus. Florida's baseball team first played at the new facility in the spring of 1911, and the football team scheduled two home games there in the fall. Previously, the football and baseball programs had played their home games either at a municipal park in downtown Gainesville or at larger facilities out of town.

== Origins of the nickname ==
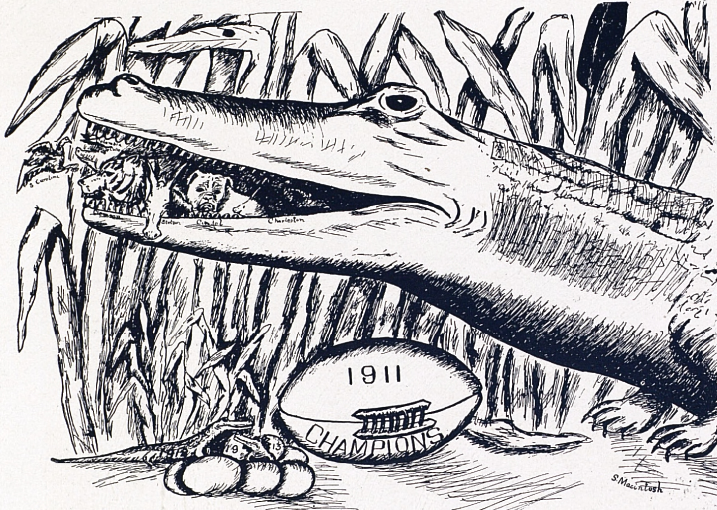
A cartoon showing the Gators eating all of their opponents

The 1911 Florida football team was the first to officially use the "Gators" nickname, though the exact timing and rationale behind the choice is unclear. The squad was captained by Neal "BoGator" Storter, and according to university lore and former UF historian Carl Van Ness, the team simply adopted his nickname. However, Storter himself denied the story and stated the mascot originated when a reporter for the Macon Telegraph wrote "Macon to be invaded by a bunch of alligators" before Florida arrived in town to play the Mercer Bears in 1910.

Alternatively, the university's official athletics website says that the nickname had originated in 1908, when a local Gainesville merchant ordered school pennants to sell at his store and thought that the reptile made a suitable mascot since "no other school had adopted it and because the alligator was native to the state". The choice proved popular enough that the school officially adopted the mascot a few years later, perhaps at least partially due to the football captain's similar nickname.

== Schedule ==
Date	Time	Opponent	Site	Result	Attendance
October 7		The Citadel	University Field; Gainesville, FL	W 15–3	
October 21		at South Carolina	Davis Field; Columbia, SC	T 6–6	
October 25	4:10 p.m.	at Clemson	Bowman Field; Calhoun, SC	W 6–5	
November 4		Columbia College	University Field; Gainesville, FL	W 9–0	
November 11		at Stetson	DeLand, FL	W 27–0	1,500
November 30		vs. College of Charleston	Jacksonville, FL	W 21–0	

== Game summaries ==
=== The Citadel ===
The season opened with a 15–3 victory over The Citadel Bulldogs at the first football game played at University Athletic Field.

=== South Carolina ===
Florida at South Carolina

Team	1	2	3	4	Total
Florida	6	0	0	0	6
S. Carolina	0	6	0	0	6

- Date: October 21
- Location: Davis Field • Columbia, SC

In the second week of play, Florida fought the South Carolina Gamecocks to a 6–6 tie. Earle Taylor scored in the first quarter and the Gamecocks matched in the second.

The starting lineup was Swanson (left end), Coarsey (left tackle), Lawler (left guard), Storter (center), Hancock (right guard), Bullock (right tackle), Buie (right end), Shackleford (quarterback), Davis (left halfback), Taylor (right halfback), Tenney (fullback).

=== Clemson ===
Florida at Clemson

Team	1	2	3	4	Total
• Florida	0	0	0	6	6
Clemson	5	0	0	0	5

- Date: October 25
- Location: Bowman Field
  Calhoun, SC
- Game start: 4:10 p. m.
- Referee: Captain Hill (Georgia Tech)

Florida upset the Clemson Tigers by a single point, 6–5, in the two school's first-ever meeting. "The game as a whole, was a poor exhibition of football." Clemson scored in the first six minutes when Webb took it over. Towards the end of the fourth quarter, the Gators' Dummy Taylor picked up a fumble and ran 45 yards for a touchdown, and then kicked the extra point to win. Norm Carlson called it "Florida's first road win against a quality college opponent."

On the winning extra point, the holder Sam Buie recalled "Doc Walker of Jacksonville bet Captain Hill of Georgia Tech, the referee, that Dummy would make it. They bet, and Dummy kicked it." "It was on the South Carolina trip that the Florida team was dubbed the ‘Alligators,’ and the battle that took place . . .between the Clemson Tigers and the Florida Alligators is one long to be remembered!" declared the Florida Pennant.

The starting lineup was Bonus (left end), Bullock (left tackle), Wilson (left guard), Storter (center), Baker (right guard), Hancock (right tackle), Buie (right end), Shackleford (quarterback), Davis (left halfback), Taylor (right halfback), Tenney (fullback).

=== Columbia College ===
Florida beat Columbia College 9–0. Taylor kicked three field goals. The starting lineup was Buie (left end), Hancock (left tackle), Wilson (left guard), Storter (center), Aker (right guard), Coarsey (right tackle), Swanson (right end), Shackleford (quarterback), Gavis (left halfback), Taylor (right halfback), Tenney (fullback).

=== Stetson ===
Florida at Stetson

Team	1	2	3	4	Total
• Florida	0	9	9	8	26
Stetson	0	0	0	0	0

- Date: November 11
- Location: DeLand, FL
- Game attendance: 1,500

Florida beat Stetson 26–0. The Stetson Weekly Collegiate called it "the greatest football game ever played in the state of Florida." Taylor drop kicked a 45-yard field goal and ran for two touchdowns.

The starting lineup was Swanson (left end), Coarsey (left tackle), Baker (left guard), Storter (center), Wilson (right guard), Bullock (right tackle), Buie (right end), Shackleford (quarterback), Tenney (left halfback), Taylor (right halfback), Pound (fullback).

=== Charleston ===
Florida closed the season with a 21–0 defeat of Charleston. "Florida should have made at least three more touchdowns."

== Postseason ==
Due to their 3–0–1 record against opponents from the state, the Gators proclaimed themselves to be "champions of South Carolina" as well as Florida.

Earle "Dummy" Taylor, the only five-letter winner in team history, scored 49 of the season's 84 points (including a school-record eight field goals). He scored 25 points on the ground and points-after, and 24 on field goals. He also threw two touchdown passes.

== Personnel ==
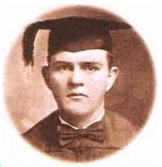
Team captain Neal "BoGator" Storter

=== Linemen ===
Player	Position	Games started	High school	Height	Weight	Age
A. A. Baker	Guard	3			175	
J. R. Bullock	Tackle	3			160	
Sam Buie	End	4			124	
Jim Coarsey	Guard	3			170	
Neal Storter	Center	4		5'11"	170	21
Joe Swanson	End	3				
R. B. Wilson	Guard	3				

=== Backfield ===
Player	Position	Games started	High school	Height	Weight	Age
F. G. Davis	Fullback	3				
Bob Shackleford	Quarterback	4				
Dummy Taylor	Halfback	4			165	20
Louis E. Tenney	Halfback	4			155	

=== Subs ===
Player	Position	Games started	High school	Height	Weight	Age
Hancock	Tackle	3				
Harvey Hester	Back					
S. W. Lawler	Back and Line					
J. A. Miller	End					
Hoyle Pounds	Back and End	1				
Hubby Price	Line					
A. G. Shands	Quarterback and End					
John Sutton	Line					

=== Scoring leaders ===
Player	Touchdowns	Extra points	Field goals	Safeties	Points
Dummy Taylor	4	5	8	0	49
Sam Buie	1	0	0	0	5
?	6	0	0	0	30
TOTAL	11	5	8	0	84

=== Coaching staff ===
- Head coach: George E. Pyle
- Manager: Roswell King

== Bibliography ==
- Carlson, Norm (2007). University of Florida Football Vault: The History of the Florida Gators. Atlanta, Georgia: Whitman Publishing, LLC. ISBN 978-0-7948-2298-9.
- McEwen, Tom (1974). The Gators: A Story of Florida Football. Huntsville, Alabama: The Strode Publishers. ISBN 0-87397-025-X.
