= 1911 Maryland Aggies football team =

American college football season

1911 Maryland Aggies football
- Conference: Independent
- Record: 4–4–2
- Head coach: Charley Donnelly (1st season; first 8 games); Curley Byrd (last 2 games)

1911 Southern college football independents records
	Conf.			Overall
Team	W	L	T	W		L		T
Oklahoma		–		8	–	0	–	0
Florida		–		5	–	0	–	1
VMI		–		7	–	1	–	0
Texas A&M		–		6	–	1	–	0
Georgetown		–		7	–	1	–	1
Navy		–		6	–	0	–	3
North Carolina		–		6	–	1	–	1
VPI		–		6	–	1	–	2
Virginia		–		8	–	2	–	0
Louisiana Industrial		–		4	–	1	–	1
Marshall		–		4	–	1	–	1
Arkansas		–		6	–	2	–	1
Oklahoma A&M		–		5	–	2	–	0
Texas		–		5	–	2	–	0
Washington and Lee		–		4	–	2	–	2
West Virginia		–		6	–	3	–	0
Davidson		–		5	–	3	–	0
North Carolina A&M		–		5	–	3	–	0
Chattanooga		–		3	–	2	–	0
Catholic University		–		3	–	2	–	2
Maryland		–		4	–	4	–	2
Baylor		–		3	–	4	–	2
Wake Forest		–		3	–	5	–	0
Delaware		–		2	–	5	–	2
South Carolina		–		1	–	4	–	2
Southwestern Louisiana Industrial		–		1	–	4	–	1
Spring Hill		–		1	–	3	–	0
Southwest Texas State		–		1	–	3	–	0
Stetson		–		1	–	3	–	0
Birmingham		–		0	–	6	–	1
Middle Tennessee State Normal		–		0	–	1	–	0

The 1911 Maryland Aggies football team was an American football team that represented Maryland Agricultural College (which became Maryland State College in 1916 and part of the University of Maryland in 1920) in the 1911 college football season. The Aggies compiled a 4–4–2 record and were outscored by their opponents, 72 to 37. Charley Donnelly coached the Aggies in their first eight games, compiling a 2–4–2 record; Curley Byrd took over as coach for the final two games, both victories.

== Schedule ==
Date	Time	Opponent	Site	Result	Attendance	Source
September 27		Washington Technical High School	College Park, MD	W 6–0		
September 30	4:00 p.m.	at Richmond	Broad Street Park; Richmond, VA	T 0–0		
October 14		Fredericksburg College	College Park, MD	W 5–0		
October 18		Central High School (Washington, DC)	College Park, MD	L 0–14		
October 21		Johns Hopkins	College Park, MD	L 3–6		
October 28		Catholic University	College Park, MD	T 6–6		
November 4		St. John's (MD)	College Park, MD	L 0–27		
November 11		at Washington College	Chestertown, MD	L 5–17		
November 18		Western Maryland	College Park, MD	W 6–0		
November 25		Gallaudet	College Park, MD	W 6–2		
