= 1911 Louisiana Industrial football team =

American college football season

1911 Louisiana Industrial football
- Conference: Independent
- Record: 4–1–1
- Head coach: Percy S. Prince (3rd season)
- Captain: A. A. Smith

1911 Southern college football independents records
	Conf.			Overall
Team	W	L	T	W		L		T
Oklahoma		–		8	–	0	–	0
Florida		–		5	–	0	–	1
VMI		–		7	–	1	–	0
Texas A&M		–		6	–	1	–	0
Georgetown		–		7	–	1	–	1
Navy		–		6	–	0	–	3
North Carolina		–		6	–	1	–	1
VPI		–		6	–	1	–	2
Virginia		–		8	–	2	–	0
Louisiana Industrial		–		4	–	1	–	1
Marshall		–		4	–	1	–	1
Arkansas		–		6	–	2	–	1
Oklahoma A&M		–		5	–	2	–	0
Texas		–		5	–	2	–	0
Washington and Lee		–		4	–	2	–	2
West Virginia		–		6	–	3	–	0
Davidson		–		5	–	3	–	0
North Carolina A&M		–		5	–	3	–	0
Chattanooga		–		3	–	2	–	0
Catholic University		–		3	–	2	–	2
Maryland		–		4	–	4	–	2
Baylor		–		3	–	4	–	2
Wake Forest		–		3	–	5	–	0
Delaware		–		2	–	5	–	2
South Carolina		–		1	–	4	–	2
Southwestern Louisiana Industrial		–		1	–	4	–	1
Spring Hill		–		1	–	3	–	0
Southwest Texas State		–		1	–	3	–	0
Stetson		–		1	–	3	–	0
Birmingham		–		0	–	6	–	1
Middle Tennessee State Normal		–		0	–	1	–	0

The 1911 Louisiana Industrial football team was an American football team that represented the Louisiana Industrial Institute—now known as Louisiana Tech University—as an independent during the 1911 college football season. Led by third-year head coach Percy S. Prince, Louisiana Industrial compiled a record of 4–1–1. The team's captain was A. A. Smith.

== Schedule ==
Date	Time	Opponent	Site	Result	Source
October 13	3:00 p.m.	at Ole Miss	Oxford, MS	L 0–15	
October 23		at Ouachita Baptist	Arkadelphia, AR	W 6–0	
October 25		at Hendrix	Conway, AR	T 5–5	
November 4	11:30 a.m.	vs. Louisiana Normal	State Fair Grounds; Shreveport, LA (rivalry)	W 39–0	
November 10		Mississippi College	Ruston, LA	W 25–0	
November 20		Henderson	Ruston, LA	W 24–3	
All times are in Central time
