= 1911 Washington and Lee Generals football team =

American college football season

1911 Washington and Lee Generals football
- Conference: Independent
- Record: 4–2–2
- Head coach: J. W. H. Pollard (2nd season)
- Home stadium: Wilson Field

1911 Southern college football independents records
	Conf.			Overall
Team	W	L	T	W		L		T
Oklahoma		–		8	–	0	–	0
Florida		–		5	–	0	–	1
VMI		–		7	–	1	–	0
Texas A&M		–		6	–	1	–	0
Georgetown		–		7	–	1	–	1
Navy		–		6	–	0	–	3
North Carolina		–		6	–	1	–	1
VPI		–		6	–	1	–	2
Virginia		–		8	–	2	–	0
Louisiana Industrial		–		4	–	1	–	1
Marshall		–		4	–	1	–	1
Arkansas		–		6	–	2	–	1
Oklahoma A&M		–		5	–	2	–	0
Texas		–		5	–	2	–	0
Washington and Lee		–		4	–	2	–	2
West Virginia		–		6	–	3	–	0
Davidson		–		5	–	3	–	0
North Carolina A&M		–		5	–	3	–	0
Chattanooga		–		3	–	2	–	0
Catholic University		–		3	–	2	–	2
Maryland		–		4	–	4	–	2
Baylor		–		3	–	4	–	2
Wake Forest		–		3	–	5	–	0
Delaware		–		2	–	5	–	2
South Carolina		–		1	–	4	–	2
Southwestern Louisiana Industrial		–		1	–	4	–	1
Spring Hill		–		1	–	3	–	0
Southwest Texas State		–		1	–	3	–	0
Stetson		–		1	–	3	–	0
Birmingham		–		0	–	6	–	1
Middle Tennessee State Normal		–		0	–	1	–	0

The 1911 Washington and Lee Generals football team was an American football team that represented Washington and Lee University during the 1911 college football season as an independent. In their second year under head coach J. W. H. Pollard, the team compiled an overall record of 4–2–2.

== Schedule ==
Date	Opponent	Site	Result	Attendance	Source
October 7	Roanoke	Wilson Field; Lexington, VA	W 61–0		
October 13	Hampden–Sydney	Wilson Field; Lexington, VA	W 40–0		
October 21	Wake Forest	Wilson Field; Lexington, VA	W 18–5		
October 28	vs. VPI	Fair Grounds; Roanoke, VA	T 5–5	3,000	
November 4	Medical College of Virginia	Wilson Field; Lexington, VA	W 31–0		
November 11	at North Carolina A&M	Riddick Stadium; Raleigh, NC	L 3–15		
November 18	vs. North Carolina	Lafayette Field; Norfolk, VA	L 0–4		
November 30	at Tulane	Tulane Stadium; New Orleans, LA	T 5–5		
