= 1911 Southwestern Louisiana Industrial football team =

American college football season

1911 Southwestern Louisiana Industrial football
- Conference: Independent
- Record: 1–4–1
- Head coach: Clement J. McNaspy (4th season)
- Home stadium: Campus Athletic Field

1911 Southern college football independents records
	Conf.			Overall
Team	W	L	T	W		L		T
Oklahoma		–		8	–	0	–	0
Florida		–		5	–	0	–	1
VMI		–		7	–	1	–	0
Texas A&M		–		6	–	1	–	0
Georgetown		–		7	–	1	–	1
Navy		–		6	–	0	–	3
North Carolina		–		6	–	1	–	1
VPI		–		6	–	1	–	2
Virginia		–		8	–	2	–	0
Louisiana Industrial		–		4	–	1	–	1
Marshall		–		4	–	1	–	1
Arkansas		–		6	–	2	–	1
Oklahoma A&M		–		5	–	2	–	0
Texas		–		5	–	2	–	0
Washington and Lee		–		4	–	2	–	2
West Virginia		–		6	–	3	–	0
Davidson		–		5	–	3	–	0
North Carolina A&M		–		5	–	3	–	0
Chattanooga		–		3	–	2	–	0
Catholic University		–		3	–	2	–	2
Maryland		–		4	–	4	–	2
Baylor		–		3	–	4	–	2
Wake Forest		–		3	–	5	–	0
Delaware		–		2	–	5	–	2
South Carolina		–		1	–	4	–	2
Southwestern Louisiana Industrial		–		1	–	4	–	1
Spring Hill		–		1	–	3	–	0
Southwest Texas State		–		1	–	3	–	0
Stetson		–		1	–	3	–	0
Birmingham		–		0	–	6	–	1
Middle Tennessee State Normal		–		0	–	1	–	0

The 1911 Southwestern Louisiana Industrial football team was an American football team that represented the Southwestern Louisiana Industrial Institute (now known as the University of Louisiana at Lafayette) as an independent during the 1911 college football season. In their fourth year under head coach Clement J. McNaspy, the team compiled a 1–4–1 record.

== Schedule ==
Date	Opponent	Site	Result	Source
October 7	at LSU	State Field; Baton Rouge, LA	L 0–42	
October 18	at Tulane	Tulane Stadium; New Orleans, LA	L 0–27	
October 23	Louisiana College	Campus Athletic Field; Lafayette, LA	L 0–9	
November 14	at Louisiana College	Pineville, LA	T 0–0	
November 30	at Louisiana Normal	Natchitoches, LA	W 30–6	
	Jefferson College		L 5–11	
