= 1911 Texas A&M Aggies football team =

American college football season

1911 Texas A&M Aggies football
- Conference: Independent
- Record: 6–1
- Head coach: Charley Moran (3rd season)
- Home stadium: Kyle Field

1911 Southern college football independents records
	Conf.			Overall
Team	W	L	T	W		L		T
Oklahoma		–		8	–	0	–	0
Florida		–		5	–	0	–	1
VMI		–		7	–	1	–	0
Texas A&M		–		6	–	1	–	0
Georgetown		–		7	–	1	–	1
Navy		–		6	–	0	–	3
North Carolina		–		6	–	1	–	1
VPI		–		6	–	1	–	2
Virginia		–		8	–	2	–	0
Louisiana Industrial		–		4	–	1	–	1
Marshall		–		4	–	1	–	1
Arkansas		–		6	–	2	–	1
Oklahoma A&M		–		5	–	2	–	0
Texas		–		5	–	2	–	0
Washington and Lee		–		4	–	2	–	2
West Virginia		–		6	–	3	–	0
Davidson		–		5	–	3	–	0
North Carolina A&M		–		5	–	3	–	0
Chattanooga		–		3	–	2	–	0
Catholic University		–		3	–	2	–	2
Maryland		–		4	–	4	–	2
Baylor		–		3	–	4	–	2
Wake Forest		–		3	–	5	–	0
Delaware		–		2	–	5	–	2
South Carolina		–		1	–	4	–	2
Southwestern Louisiana Industrial		–		1	–	4	–	1
Spring Hill		–		1	–	3	–	0
Southwest Texas State		–		1	–	3	–	0
Stetson		–		1	–	3	–	0
Birmingham		–		0	–	6	–	1
Middle Tennessee State Normal		–		0	–	1	–	0

The 1911 Texas A&M Aggies football team represented the Agricultural and Mechanical College of Texas—now known as Texas A&M University—as an independent during the 1911 college football season. In its third season under head coach Charley Moran, the team compiled an overall record of 6–1.

== Schedule ==
Date	Opponent	Site	Result	Attendance	Source
October 6	Southwestern (TX)	Kyle Field; College Station, TX	W 22–0	1,500	
October 13	Austin	Kyle Field; College Station, TX	W 33–0		
October 21	vs. Auburn	Gaston Park; Dallas, TX	W 16–0	7,000	
October 27	Ole Miss	Kyle Field; College Station, TX	W 17–0		
November 13	vs. Texas	West End Park; Houston, TX (rivalry)	L 0–6		
November 25	Dallas	Kyle Field; College Station, TX	W 24–0		
November 30	Baylor	Kyle Field; College Station, TX (rivalry)	W 22–11		
