= 1911 Southwest Texas State football team =

American college football season

1911 Southwest Texas State football
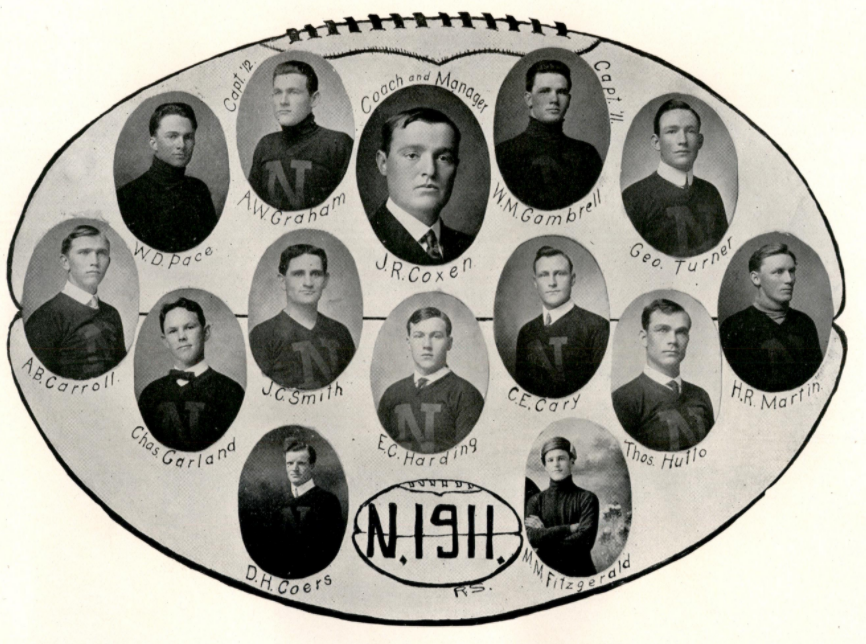
- Conference: Independent
- Record: 1–3
- Head coach: James R. Coxen (2nd season)
- Captain: A. W. Graham

1911 Southern college football independents records
| | Conf. | | | Overall |
| Team | W | L | T | W | | L | | T |
|---|---|---|---|---|---|---|---|---|
| Oklahoma | | – | | 8 | – | 0 | – | 0 |
| Florida | | – | | 5 | – | 0 | – | 1 |
| VMI | | – | | 7 | – | 1 | – | 0 |
| Texas A&M | | – | | 6 | – | 1 | – | 0 |
| Georgetown | | – | | 7 | – | 1 | – | 1 |
| Navy | | – | | 6 | – | 0 | – | 3 |
| North Carolina | | – | | 6 | – | 1 | – | 1 |
| VPI | | – | | 6 | – | 1 | – | 2 |
| Virginia | | – | | 8 | – | 2 | – | 0 |
| Louisiana Industrial | | – | | 4 | – | 1 | – | 1 |
| Marshall | | – | | 4 | – | 1 | – | 1 |
| Arkansas | | – | | 6 | – | 2 | – | 1 |
| Oklahoma A&M | | – | | 5 | – | 2 | – | 0 |
| Texas | | – | | 5 | – | 2 | – | 0 |
| Washington and Lee | | – | | 4 | – | 2 | – | 2 |
| West Virginia | | – | | 6 | – | 3 | – | 0 |
| Davidson | | – | | 5 | – | 3 | – | 0 |
| North Carolina A&M | | – | | 5 | – | 3 | – | 0 |
| Chattanooga | | – | | 3 | – | 2 | – | 0 |
| Catholic University | | – | | 3 | – | 2 | – | 2 |
| Maryland | | – | | 4 | – | 4 | – | 2 |
| Baylor | | – | | 3 | – | 4 | – | 2 |
| Wake Forest | | – | | 3 | – | 5 | – | 0 |
| Delaware | | – | | 2 | – | 5 | – | 2 |
| South Carolina | | – | | 1 | – | 4 | – | 2 |
| Southwestern Louisiana Industrial | | – | | 1 | – | 4 | – | 1 |
| Spring Hill | | – | | 1 | – | 3 | – | 0 |
| Southwest Texas State | | – | | 1 | – | 3 | – | 0 |
| Stetson | | – | | 1 | – | 3 | – | 0 |
| Birmingham | | – | | 0 | – | 6 | – | 1 |
| Middle Tennessee State Normal | | – | | 0 | – | 1 | – | 0 |

The 1911 Southwest Texas State Normal School football team was an American football team that represented Southwest Texas State Normal School—now known as Texas State University–as an independent during the 1911 college football season. In its second season under head coach James R. Coxen, the team compiled a 1–3 record. A. W. Graham was the team's captain.

== Schedule ==
| Date | Opponent | Site | Result | Source |
|---|---|---|---|---|
| October 16 | San Marcos High School | Coronal Athletic Field; San Marcos, TX | W 11–5 | |
| October 21 | Coronal Institute | San Marcos, TX | L 0–17 | |
| | San Marcos Baptist Academy | | L 0–5 | |
| | San Marcos Baptist Academy | | L 0–10 | |
