= 1911 Baylor football team =

American college football season

1911 Baylor football
- Conference: Independent
- Record: 2–4–2
- Head coach: Ralph Glaze (2nd season)
- Captain: W. A. "Jack" Little
- Home stadium: Carroll Field

1911 Southern college football independents records
	Conf.			Overall
Team	W	L	T	W		L		T
Oklahoma		–		8	–	0	–	0
Florida		–		5	–	0	–	1
VMI		–		7	–	1	–	0
Texas A&M		–		6	–	1	–	0
Georgetown		–		7	–	1	–	1
Navy		–		6	–	0	–	3
North Carolina		–		6	–	1	–	1
VPI		–		6	–	1	–	2
Virginia		–		8	–	2	–	0
Louisiana Industrial		–		4	–	1	–	1
Marshall		–		4	–	1	–	1
Arkansas		–		6	–	2	–	1
Oklahoma A&M		–		5	–	2	–	0
Texas		–		5	–	2	–	0
Washington and Lee		–		4	–	2	–	2
West Virginia		–		6	–	3	–	0
Davidson		–		5	–	3	–	0
North Carolina A&M		–		5	–	3	–	0
Chattanooga		–		3	–	2	–	0
Catholic University		–		3	–	2	–	2
Maryland		–		4	–	4	–	2
Baylor		–		3	–	4	–	2
Wake Forest		–		3	–	5	–	0
Delaware		–		2	–	5	–	2
South Carolina		–		1	–	4	–	2
Southwestern Louisiana Industrial		–		1	–	4	–	1
Spring Hill		–		1	–	3	–	0
Southwest Texas State		–		1	–	3	–	0
Stetson		–		1	–	3	–	0
Birmingham		–		0	–	6	–	1
Middle Tennessee State Normal		–		0	–	1	–	0

The 1911 Baylor football team was an American football team that represented Baylor University as an independent during the 1911 college football season. In its second season under head coach Ralph Glaze, the team compiled a 2–4–2 record and was outscored by their opponents by a total of 53 to 40.

== Schedule ==
Date	Opponent	Site	Result	Source
October 7	Polytechnic (TX)	Carroll Field; Waco, TX	T 0–0	
October 17	Austin	Carroll Field; Waco, TX	L 0–9	
October 21	at Texas	Clark Field; Austin, TX (rivalry)	L 0–11	
November 4	LSU	Carroll Field; Waco, TX	L 0–6	
November 11	TCU	Carroll Field; Waco, TX (rivalry)	W 12–0	
November 17	at Trinity (TX)	Yoakum Field; Waxahachie, TX	W 12–0	
November 24	at Southwestern (TX)	Georgetown, TX	T 5–5	
November 30	at Texas A&M	Kyle Field; College Station, TX (rivalry)	L 11–22	
