= 1911 West Virginia Mountaineers football team =

American college football season

1911 West Virginia Mountaineers football
- Conference: Independent
- Record: 6–3
- Head coach: Charles Augustus Lueder (4th season)
- Captain: Ernest Bell

1911 Southern college football independents records
| | Conf. | | | Overall |
| Team | W | L | T | W | | L | | T |
|---|---|---|---|---|---|---|---|---|
| Oklahoma | | – | | 8 | – | 0 | – | 0 |
| Florida | | – | | 5 | – | 0 | – | 1 |
| VMI | | – | | 7 | – | 1 | – | 0 |
| Texas A&M | | – | | 6 | – | 1 | – | 0 |
| Georgetown | | – | | 7 | – | 1 | – | 1 |
| Navy | | – | | 6 | – | 0 | – | 3 |
| North Carolina | | – | | 6 | – | 1 | – | 1 |
| VPI | | – | | 6 | – | 1 | – | 2 |
| Virginia | | – | | 8 | – | 2 | – | 0 |
| Louisiana Industrial | | – | | 4 | – | 1 | – | 1 |
| Marshall | | – | | 4 | – | 1 | – | 1 |
| Arkansas | | – | | 6 | – | 2 | – | 1 |
| Oklahoma A&M | | – | | 5 | – | 2 | – | 0 |
| Texas | | – | | 5 | – | 2 | – | 0 |
| Washington and Lee | | – | | 4 | – | 2 | – | 2 |
| West Virginia | | – | | 6 | – | 3 | – | 0 |
| Davidson | | – | | 5 | – | 3 | – | 0 |
| North Carolina A&M | | – | | 5 | – | 3 | – | 0 |
| Chattanooga | | – | | 3 | – | 2 | – | 0 |
| Catholic University | | – | | 3 | – | 2 | – | 2 |
| Maryland | | – | | 4 | – | 4 | – | 2 |
| Baylor | | – | | 3 | – | 4 | – | 2 |
| Wake Forest | | – | | 3 | – | 5 | – | 0 |
| Delaware | | – | | 2 | – | 5 | – | 2 |
| South Carolina | | – | | 1 | – | 4 | – | 2 |
| Southwestern Louisiana Industrial | | – | | 1 | – | 4 | – | 1 |
| Spring Hill | | – | | 1 | – | 3 | – | 0 |
| Southwest Texas State | | – | | 1 | – | 3 | – | 0 |
| Stetson | | – | | 1 | – | 3 | – | 0 |
| Birmingham | | – | | 0 | – | 6 | – | 1 |
| Middle Tennessee State Normal | | – | | 0 | – | 1 | – | 0 |

The 1911 West Virginia Mountaineers football team was an American football team that represented West Virginia University as an independent during the 1911 college football season. In its fourth and final season under head coach Charles Augustus Lueder, the team compiled a 6–3 record and outscored opponents by a total of 91 to 67. Ernest Bell was the team captain.

== Schedule ==
| Date | Opponent | Site | Result |
|---|---|---|---|
| September 30 | Waynesburg | Morgantown, WV | W 17–0 |
| October 14 | Ohio | Morgantown, WV | W 3–0 |
| October 21 | Westminster (PA) | Morgantown, WV | W 3–0 |
| October 28 | Marshall | Morgantown, WV (rivalry) | W 17–15 |
| November 4 | Washington & Jefferson | Morgantown, WV | W 6–5 |
| November 11 | at Navy | Annapolis, MD | L 0–32 |
| November 18 | Allegheny | Morgantown, WV | L 6–10 |
| November 25 | West Virginia Wesleyan | Morgantown, WV | W 36–0 |
| November 30 | vs. Denison | Fairmont, WV | L 3–5 |
