= 1911 Georgetown Blue and Gray football team =

American college football season

1911 Georgetown Blue and Gray football

South Atlantic champion
- Conference: Independent
- Record: 7–1–1
- Head coach: Fred K. Nielsen (2nd season)
- Captain: Vince Dailey
- Home stadium: Georgetown Field

1911 Southern college football independents records
	Conf.			Overall
Team	W	L	T	W		L		T
Oklahoma		–		8	–	0	–	0
Florida		–		5	–	0	–	1
VMI		–		7	–	1	–	0
Texas A&M		–		6	–	1	–	0
Georgetown		–		7	–	1	–	1
Navy		–		6	–	0	–	3
North Carolina		–		6	–	1	–	1
VPI		–		6	–	1	–	2
Virginia		–		8	–	2	–	0
Louisiana Industrial		–		4	–	1	–	1
Marshall		–		4	–	1	–	1
Arkansas		–		6	–	2	–	1
Oklahoma A&M		–		5	–	2	–	0
Texas		–		5	–	2	–	0
Washington and Lee		–		4	–	2	–	2
West Virginia		–		6	–	3	–	0
Davidson		–		5	–	3	–	0
North Carolina A&M		–		5	–	3	–	0
Chattanooga		–		3	–	2	–	0
Catholic University		–		3	–	2	–	2
Maryland		–		4	–	4	–	2
Baylor		–		3	–	4	–	2
Wake Forest		–		3	–	5	–	0
Delaware		–		2	–	5	–	2
South Carolina		–		1	–	4	–	2
Southwestern Louisiana Industrial		–		1	–	4	–	1
Spring Hill		–		1	–	3	–	0
Southwest Texas State		–		1	–	3	–	0
Stetson		–		1	–	3	–	0
Birmingham		–		0	–	6	–	1
Middle Tennessee State Normal		–		0	–	1	–	0

The 1911 Georgetown Blue and Gray football team represented Georgetown University during the 1911 college football season. Led by Fred K. Nielsen in his second year as head coach, the team went 7–1–1, the champion among the South Atlantic teams. The team was led at quarterback by Harry Costello.

== Schedule ==
Date	Time	Opponent	Site	Result	Source
September 30		Seamen Gunners	Georgetown Field; Washington, DC	W 39–0	
October 7	3:30 p.m.	William & Mary	Georgetown Field; Washington, DC	W 66–0	
October 14		Carlisle	Georgetown Field; Washington, DC	L 5–28	
October 21		at Richmond	Broad Street Park; Richmond, VA	W 65–0	
October 28		St. John's (MD)	Georgetown Field; Washington, DC	W 20–0	
November 4		at Army	The Plain; West Point, NY	T 0–0	
November 11		Vigilant Athletic Club	Georgetown Field; Washington, DC	W 25–0	
November 18		Virginia	Georgetown Field; Washington, DC	W 9–0	
November 30		Lehigh	Georgetown Field; Washington, DC	W 28–3	
