= 1911 North Carolina A&M Aggies football team =

American college football season

1911 North Carolina A&M Aggies football
- Conference: Independent
- Record: 5–3
- Head coach: Edward L. Greene (3rd season)
- Home stadium: Riddick Stadium

1911 Southern college football independents records
	Conf.			Overall
Team	W	L	T	W		L		T
Oklahoma		–		8	–	0	–	0
Florida		–		5	–	0	–	1
VMI		–		7	–	1	–	0
Texas A&M		–		6	–	1	–	0
Georgetown		–		7	–	1	–	1
Navy		–		6	–	0	–	3
North Carolina		–		6	–	1	–	1
VPI		–		6	–	1	–	2
Virginia		–		8	–	2	–	0
Louisiana Industrial		–		4	–	1	–	1
Marshall		–		4	–	1	–	1
Arkansas		–		6	–	2	–	1
Oklahoma A&M		–		5	–	2	–	0
Texas		–		5	–	2	–	0
Washington and Lee		–		4	–	2	–	2
West Virginia		–		6	–	3	–	0
Davidson		–		5	–	3	–	0
North Carolina A&M		–		5	–	3	–	0
Chattanooga		–		3	–	2	–	0
Catholic University		–		3	–	2	–	2
Maryland		–		4	–	4	–	2
Baylor		–		3	–	4	–	2
Wake Forest		–		3	–	5	–	0
Delaware		–		2	–	5	–	2
South Carolina		–		1	–	4	–	2
Southwestern Louisiana Industrial		–		1	–	4	–	1
Spring Hill		–		1	–	3	–	0
Southwest Texas State		–		1	–	3	–	0
Stetson		–		1	–	3	–	0
Birmingham		–		0	–	6	–	1
Middle Tennessee State Normal		–		0	–	1	–	0

The 1911 North Carolina A&M Aggies football team represented North Carolina College of Agriculture and Mechanic Arts—now known as North Carolina State University—as an independent during the 1911 college football season. Led by third-year head coach Edward L. Greene, the Aggies compiled a record of 5–3.

== Schedule ==
Date	Opponent	Site	Result	Attendance	Source
October 7	USS Franklin	Riddick Stadium; Raleigh, NC	W 23–0		
October 14	at VMI	VMI Parade Ground; Lexington, VA	L 5–6		
October 19	Bucknell	Riddick Stadium; Raleigh, NC	W 6–0		
October 28	Tennessee	Riddick Stadium; Raleigh, NC	W 16–0		
November 4	at Navy	Worden Field; Annapolis, MD	L 6–17		
November 11	Washington and Lee	Riddick Stadium; Raleigh, NC	W 15–3		
November 18	at Wake Forest	Wake Forest, NC	W 13–5		
November 30	vs. VPI	Lafayette Field; Norfolk, VA	L 0–3	6,000	
