= 1911 Navy Midshipmen football team =

American college football season

1911 Navy Midshipmen football
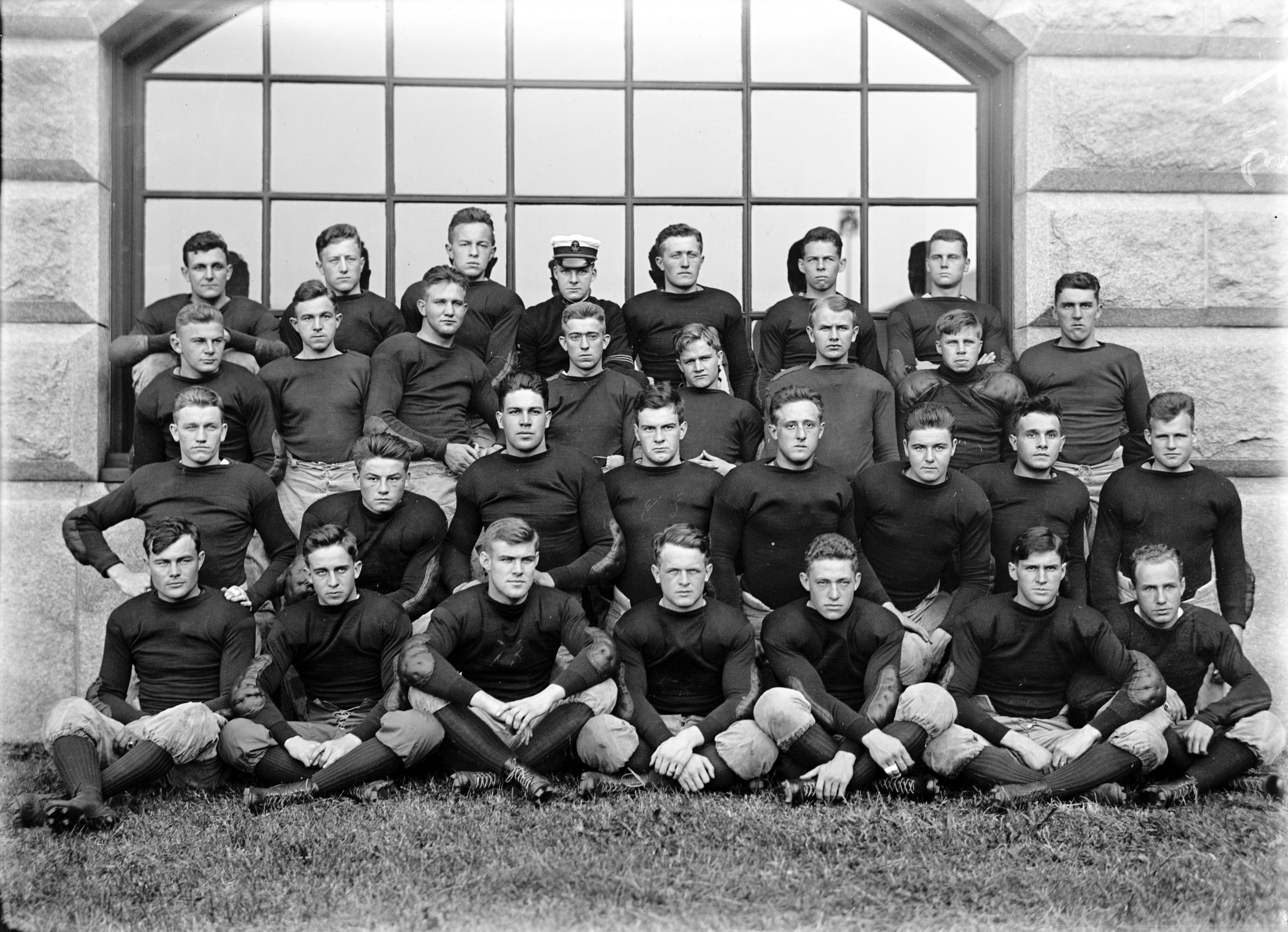
- Conference: Independent
- Record: 6–0–3
- Head coach: Douglas Legate Howard (1st season)
- Captain: Jack Dalton
- Home stadium: Worden Field

1911 Southern college football independents records
	Conf.			Overall
Team	W	L	T	W		L		T
Oklahoma		–		8	–	0	–	0
Florida		–		5	–	0	–	1
VMI		–		7	–	1	–	0
Texas A&M		–		6	–	1	–	0
Georgetown		–		7	–	1	–	1
Navy		–		6	–	0	–	3
North Carolina		–		6	–	1	–	1
VPI		–		6	–	1	–	2
Virginia		–		8	–	2	–	0
Louisiana Industrial		–		4	–	1	–	1
Marshall		–		4	–	1	–	1
Arkansas		–		6	–	2	–	1
Oklahoma A&M		–		5	–	2	–	0
Texas		–		5	–	2	–	0
Washington and Lee		–		4	–	2	–	2
West Virginia		–		6	–	3	–	0
Davidson		–		5	–	3	–	0
North Carolina A&M		–		5	–	3	–	0
Chattanooga		–		3	–	2	–	0
Catholic University		–		3	–	2	–	2
Maryland		–		4	–	4	–	2
Baylor		–		3	–	4	–	2
Wake Forest		–		3	–	5	–	0
Delaware		–		2	–	5	–	2
South Carolina		–		1	–	4	–	2
Southwestern Louisiana Industrial		–		1	–	4	–	1
Spring Hill		–		1	–	3	–	0
Southwest Texas State		–		1	–	3	–	0
Stetson		–		1	–	3	–	0
Birmingham		–		0	–	6	–	1
Middle Tennessee State Normal		–		0	–	1	–	0

The 1911 Navy Midshipmen football team represented the United States Naval Academy during the 1911 college football season. The team compiled an undefeated 6–0–3 record, shut out seven opponents, and defeated its opponents by a combined score of 116 to 11.

The annual Army–Navy Game was played on November 25 at Franklin Field in Philadelphia. For the second consecutive year, the game was a low-scoring affair; Navy won 3–0 on a field goal by Jack Dalton.

Fullback Jack Dalton was the team captain and was a consensus first-team selection for the All-America team. Three other Navy player received first-team honors from one or more selectors: tackle John Brown received first-team honors from Ted Coy; guard Ray Wakeman received first-team honors from Henry L. Williams; and guard George Howe received first-team honors from The New York Globe. Brown and Dalton were both later inducted into the College Football Hall of Fame.

== Schedule ==
Date	Opponent	Site	Result	Source
October 7	Johns Hopkins	Worden Field; Annapolis, MD (rivalry)	W 27–5	
October 11	St. John's (MD)	Worden Field; Annapolis, MD	W 21–0	
October 14	Washington & Jefferson	Worden Field; Annapolis, MD	W 16–0	
October 21	Princeton	Worden Field; Annapolis, MD	T 0–0	
October 28	Western Reserve	Worden Field; Annapolis, MD	T 0–0	
November 4	North Carolina A&M	Worden Field; Annapolis, MD	W 17–6	
November 11	West Virginia	Worden Field; Annapolis, MD	W 32–0	
November 18	Penn State	Worden Field; Annapolis, MD	T 0–0	
November 25	vs. Army	Franklin Field; Philadelphia, PA (Army–Navy Game)	W 3–0	
