= 1911 Delaware Fightin' Blue Hens football team =

American college football season

1911 Delaware Fightin' Blue Hens football
- Conference: Independent
- Record: 2–5–2
- Head coach: William McAvoy (4th season)
- Captain: Carl A. Taylor

1911 Southern college football independents records
	Conf.			Overall
Team	W	L	T	W		L		T
Oklahoma		–		8	–	0	–	0
Florida		–		5	–	0	–	1
VMI		–		7	–	1	–	0
Texas A&M		–		6	–	1	–	0
Georgetown		–		7	–	1	–	1
Navy		–		6	–	0	–	3
North Carolina		–		6	–	1	–	1
VPI		–		6	–	1	–	2
Virginia		–		8	–	2	–	0
Louisiana Industrial		–		4	–	1	–	1
Marshall		–		4	–	1	–	1
Arkansas		–		6	–	2	–	1
Oklahoma A&M		–		5	–	2	–	0
Texas		–		5	–	2	–	0
Washington and Lee		–		4	–	2	–	2
West Virginia		–		6	–	3	–	0
Davidson		–		5	–	3	–	0
North Carolina A&M		–		5	–	3	–	0
Chattanooga		–		3	–	2	–	0
Catholic University		–		3	–	2	–	2
Maryland		–		4	–	4	–	2
Baylor		–		3	–	4	–	2
Wake Forest		–		3	–	5	–	0
Delaware		–		2	–	5	–	2
South Carolina		–		1	–	4	–	2
Southwestern Louisiana Industrial		–		1	–	4	–	1
Spring Hill		–		1	–	3	–	0
Southwest Texas State		–		1	–	3	–	0
Stetson		–		1	–	3	–	0
Birmingham		–		0	–	6	–	1
Middle Tennessee State Normal		–		0	–	1	–	0

The 1911 Delaware Fightin' Blue Hens football team was an American football team that represented Delaware College (later renamed the University of Delaware) as an independent during the 1911 college football season. In its fourth season under head coach William McAvoy, the team compiled a 2–5–2 record and was outscored by a total of 56 to 54. Carl A. Taylor was the team captain. The team played its home games in Newark, Delaware.

== Schedule ==
Date	Opponent	Site	Result	Source
September 23	Williamson	Newark, DE	T 0–0	
September 30	at Swarthmore	Whittier Field; Swarthmore, PA	T 0–0	
October 7	Lebanon Valley	Newark, DE	W 24–0	
October 14	at Haverford	Haverford, PA	L 0–17	
October 21	Washington College	Newark, DE	W 24–0	
October 28	at Muhlenberg	Allentown, PA	L 0–15	
November 8	at Pennsylvania Military	Chester, PA	L 6–8	
November 18	at Gettysburg	Gettysburg, PA	L 0–6	
November 25	Dickinson	Newark, DE	L 0–11	
