= Neal Storter =

American football player (1890–1979)

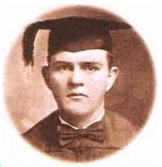

Profile
- Position: Center

Personal information
- Born: October 3, 1890; Everglades City, Florida
- Died: November 1, 1979 (aged 89); Brownsville, Texas
- Listed height: 5 ft 11 in (1.80 m)
- Listed weight: 170 lb (77 kg)

Career information
- College: Florida (1907–1911)

Awards and highlights
- All-Time Florida Gators football team (1927)

Neal Summers "Bo Gator" Storter (October 3, 1890 – November 1, 1979) was an American football center for the Florida Gators of the University of Florida. He was captain of the undefeated 1911 Florida Gators football team and is one proposed originator of the Florida Gator mascot. Storter rebuked the story himself, though. Storter was picked as the center for an All-Time Florida Gators football team in 1927.

== Background ==
Aerial view of Everglades City, looking from westerly direction and showing Port DuPont and the Barron River

Neal was born on October 3, 1890, in Everglade to George W. Storter, Jr. and Nancy Waterson.

== University of Florida ==
Storter was a member of UF's Alpha Eta chapter of Pi Kappa Alpha.

=== Bo Gator Club ===
He was the "Chief Bo Gator" of the quasi-mythical "Bo Gator Club," started in 1907 at UF. Storter was at the University of Florida when students from the E section of Buckman Hall each chipped in a dime to purchase gunpowder; and with crushed rocks as ammunition, hauled two loaded cannons into place to fire upon a traveling carnival set across from the campus. The club seemed to involve telling tales about such events.

=== College football ===
Storter was also a prominent member of the university's football team, captain of its 1911 team. One of the school's best ever centers, Storter was selected for a position on its All-Time team in 1927. The 1911 team tied the South Carolina Gamecocks, defeated The Citadel Bulldogs, Clemson and the College of Charleston, declared themselves to be the "champions of South Carolina," and finished their season 5–0–1—still the only undefeated football season in the Gators' history. The team was also the first to use the nickname "Gators." He is as such one reason given for the nickname. A former player Roy Corbett sent a letter to The Gainesville Sun congratulating the 1928 team and mentioned the nickname coming from Storter. Storter himself denied the above and stated the nickname 'Gators' came when a Macon Telegraph reporter declared "Macon to be invaded by a bunch of alligators from Florida" before the game with Mercer in 1910.

== Steamships ==
He was once manager of Lykes Brothers Steamship Company of Galveston, Texas, and was connected with the company for years as captain or port superintendent. Storter died on November 1, 1979, in Brownsville of congestive heart failure due to longstanding heart disease.
