= 1911 Chattanooga Moccasins football team =

American college football season

1911 Chattanooga Moccasins football
- Conference: Independent
- Record: 3–2
- Head coach: Leslie Stauffer (2nd season)
- Home stadium: Chamberlain Field

1911 Southern college football independents records
	Conf.			Overall
Team	W	L	T	W		L		T
Oklahoma		–		8	–	0	–	0
Florida		–		5	–	0	–	1
VMI		–		7	–	1	–	0
Texas A&M		–		6	–	1	–	0
Georgetown		–		7	–	1	–	1
Navy		–		6	–	0	–	3
North Carolina		–		6	–	1	–	1
VPI		–		6	–	1	–	2
Virginia		–		8	–	2	–	0
Louisiana Industrial		–		4	–	1	–	1
Marshall		–		4	–	1	–	1
Arkansas		–		6	–	2	–	1
Oklahoma A&M		–		5	–	2	–	0
Texas		–		5	–	2	–	0
Washington and Lee		–		4	–	2	–	2
West Virginia		–		6	–	3	–	0
Davidson		–		5	–	3	–	0
North Carolina A&M		–		5	–	3	–	0
Chattanooga		–		3	–	2	–	0
Catholic University		–		3	–	2	–	2
Maryland		–		4	–	4	–	2
Baylor		–		3	–	4	–	2
Wake Forest		–		3	–	5	–	0
Delaware		–		2	–	5	–	2
South Carolina		–		1	–	4	–	2
Southwestern Louisiana Industrial		–		1	–	4	–	1
Spring Hill		–		1	–	3	–	0
Southwest Texas State		–		1	–	3	–	0
Stetson		–		1	–	3	–	0
Birmingham		–		0	–	6	–	1
Middle Tennessee State Normal		–		0	–	1	–	0

The 1911 Chattanooga Moccasins football team represented the University of Chattanooga as an independent during the 1911 college football season. It completed its five-game schedule with a record of 3–2.

== Schedule ==
Date	Opponent	Site	Result
October 23	at Rome Athletic Club	Rome, GA	L 5–15
November 11	Rome Athletic Club	Chamberlain Field; Chattanooga, TN	W 16–0
November 18	South Pittsburg Athletic Club	Chamberlain Field; Chattanooga, TN	W 12–0
November 20	at Sewanee "B" team	Sewanee, TN	L 0–5
November 27	Sewanee "B" team	Chamberlain Field; Chattanooga, TN	W 17–5
