= 1911 South Carolina Gamecocks football team =

American college football season

1911 South Carolina Gamecocks football
- Conference: Independent
- Record: 1–4–2
- Head coach: John Neff (2nd season)
- Captain: W. C. Whitner
- Home stadium: Davis Field

1911 Southern college football independents records
	Conf.			Overall
Team	W	L	T	W		L		T
Oklahoma		–		8	–	0	–	0
Florida		–		5	–	0	–	1
VMI		–		7	–	1	–	0
Texas A&M		–		6	–	1	–	0
Georgetown		–		7	–	1	–	1
Navy		–		6	–	0	–	3
North Carolina		–		6	–	1	–	1
VPI		–		6	–	1	–	2
Virginia		–		8	–	2	–	0
Louisiana Industrial		–		4	–	1	–	1
Marshall		–		4	–	1	–	1
Arkansas		–		6	–	2	–	1
Oklahoma A&M		–		5	–	2	–	0
Texas		–		5	–	2	–	0
Washington and Lee		–		4	–	2	–	2
West Virginia		–		6	–	3	–	0
Davidson		–		5	–	3	–	0
North Carolina A&M		–		5	–	3	–	0
Chattanooga		–		3	–	2	–	0
Catholic University		–		3	–	2	–	2
Maryland		–		4	–	4	–	2
Baylor		–		3	–	4	–	2
Wake Forest		–		3	–	5	–	0
Delaware		–		2	–	5	–	2
South Carolina		–		1	–	4	–	2
Southwestern Louisiana Industrial		–		1	–	4	–	1
Spring Hill		–		1	–	3	–	0
Southwest Texas State		–		1	–	3	–	0
Stetson		–		1	–	3	–	0
Birmingham		–		0	–	6	–	1
Middle Tennessee State Normal		–		0	–	1	–	0

The 1911 South Carolina Gamecocks football team represented the University of South Carolina as an independent during the 1911 college football season. Led by John Neff in his second and final season as head coach, South Carolina compiled a record of 1–4–2.

== Schedule ==
Date	Opponent	Site	Result	Attendance	Source
October 7	at Georgia	Sanford Field; Athens, GA	L 0–38		
October 14	at Charleston	Charleston, SC	W 16–0	800	
October 21	Florida	Davis Field; Columbia, SC	T 6–6		
November 2	Clemson	State Fairgrounds; Columbia, SC	L 0–27	3,500	
November 11	at North Carolina	Chapel Hill, NC	L 0–21		
November 18	Davidson	Davis Field; Columbia, SC	L 0–10		
November 30	at The Citadel	Hampton Park; Charleston, SC	T 0–0		
