= 1911 Oklahoma A&M Aggies football team =

American college football season

1911 Oklahoma A&M Aggies football
- Conference: Independent
- Record: 5–2
- Head coach: Paul J. Davis (3rd season)

1911 Southern college football independents records
	Conf.			Overall
Team	W	L	T	W		L		T
Oklahoma		–		8	–	0	–	0
Florida		–		5	–	0	–	1
VMI		–		7	–	1	–	0
Texas A&M		–		6	–	1	–	0
Georgetown		–		7	–	1	–	1
Navy		–		6	–	0	–	3
North Carolina		–		6	–	1	–	1
VPI		–		6	–	1	–	2
Virginia		–		8	–	2	–	0
Louisiana Industrial		–		4	–	1	–	1
Marshall		–		4	–	1	–	1
Arkansas		–		6	–	2	–	1
Oklahoma A&M		–		5	–	2	–	0
Texas		–		5	–	2	–	0
Washington and Lee		–		4	–	2	–	2
West Virginia		–		6	–	3	–	0
Davidson		–		5	–	3	–	0
North Carolina A&M		–		5	–	3	–	0
Chattanooga		–		3	–	2	–	0
Catholic University		–		3	–	2	–	2
Maryland		–		4	–	4	–	2
Baylor		–		3	–	4	–	2
Wake Forest		–		3	–	5	–	0
Delaware		–		2	–	5	–	2
South Carolina		–		1	–	4	–	2
Southwestern Louisiana Industrial		–		1	–	4	–	1
Spring Hill		–		1	–	3	–	0
Southwest Texas State		–		1	–	3	–	0
Stetson		–		1	–	3	–	0
Birmingham		–		0	–	6	–	1
Middle Tennessee State Normal		–		0	–	1	–	0

The 1911 Oklahoma A&M Aggies football team represented Oklahoma A&M College in the 1911 college football season. This was the 11th year of football at A&M and the third under Paul J. Davis. The Aggies played their home games in Stillwater, Oklahoma. They finished the season 5–2.

== Schedule ==
Date	Opponent	Site	Result
October 6	Blackwell	Stillwater, OK	W 30–5
October 14	at Central State Normal	Edmond, OK	W 46–5
October 20	Oklahoma	Stillwater, OK (Bedlam)	L 0–22
October 28	at Kingfisher	Kingfisher, OK	W 84–0
November 13	Southwestern (KS)	Stillwater, OK	W 61–16
November 24	Kansas State	Stillwater, OK	L 0–11
November 30	vs. Oklahoma Methodist	Guthrie, OK	W 30–0
