= 1911 Virginia Orange and Blue football team =

American college football season

1911 Virginia Orange and Blue football
- Conference: Independent
- Record: 8–2
- Head coach: Kemper Yancey (1st season)
- Home stadium: Madison Hall Field

1911 Southern college football independents records
	Conf.			Overall
Team	W	L	T	W		L		T
Oklahoma		–		8	–	0	–	0
Florida		–		5	–	0	–	1
VMI		–		7	–	1	–	0
Texas A&M		–		6	–	1	–	0
Georgetown		–		7	–	1	–	1
Navy		–		6	–	0	–	3
North Carolina		–		6	–	1	–	1
VPI		–		6	–	1	–	2
Virginia		–		8	–	2	–	0
Louisiana Industrial		–		4	–	1	–	1
Marshall		–		4	–	1	–	1
Arkansas		–		6	–	2	–	1
Oklahoma A&M		–		5	–	2	–	0
Texas		–		5	–	2	–	0
Washington and Lee		–		4	–	2	–	2
West Virginia		–		6	–	3	–	0
Davidson		–		5	–	3	–	0
North Carolina A&M		–		5	–	3	–	0
Chattanooga		–		3	–	2	–	0
Catholic University		–		3	–	2	–	2
Maryland		–		4	–	4	–	2
Baylor		–		3	–	4	–	2
Wake Forest		–		3	–	5	–	0
Delaware		–		2	–	5	–	2
South Carolina		–		1	–	4	–	2
Southwestern Louisiana Industrial		–		1	–	4	–	1
Spring Hill		–		1	–	3	–	0
Southwest Texas State		–		1	–	3	–	0
Stetson		–		1	–	3	–	0
Birmingham		–		0	–	6	–	1
Middle Tennessee State Normal		–		0	–	1	–	0

The 1911 Virginia Orange and Blue football team represented the University of Virginia as an independent during the 1911 college football season. Led by Kemper Yancey in his first and only season as head coach, the Orange and Blue compiled a record of 8–2.

== Schedule ==
Date	Time	Opponent	Site	Result	Attendance	Source
September 23		Hampden–Sydney	Madison Hall Field; Charlottesville, VA	W 23–0		
September 30		William & Mary	Madison Hall Field; Charlottesville, VA	W 81–0		
October 7		Randolph–Macon	Madison Hall Field; Charlottesville, VA	W 31–0		
October 14		Swarthmore	Madison Hall Field; Charlottesville, VA	L 8–9		
October 21		St. John's (MD)	Madison Hall Field; Charlottesville, VA	W 6–0		
October 28		VMI	Madison Hall Field; Charlottesville, VA	W 22–6		
November 4		Wake Forest	Madison Hall Field; Charlottesville, VA	W 29–6		
November 11		at Johns Hopkins	Homewood Field; Baltimore, MD	W 34–0		
November 18		at Georgetown	Georgetown Field; Washington, DC	L 0–9		
November 30	2:30 p.m.	vs. North Carolina	Broad Street Park; Richmond, VA (South's Oldest Rivalry)	W 28–0	12,000	
