= 1911 Texas Longhorns football team =

American college football season

1911 Texas Longhorns football
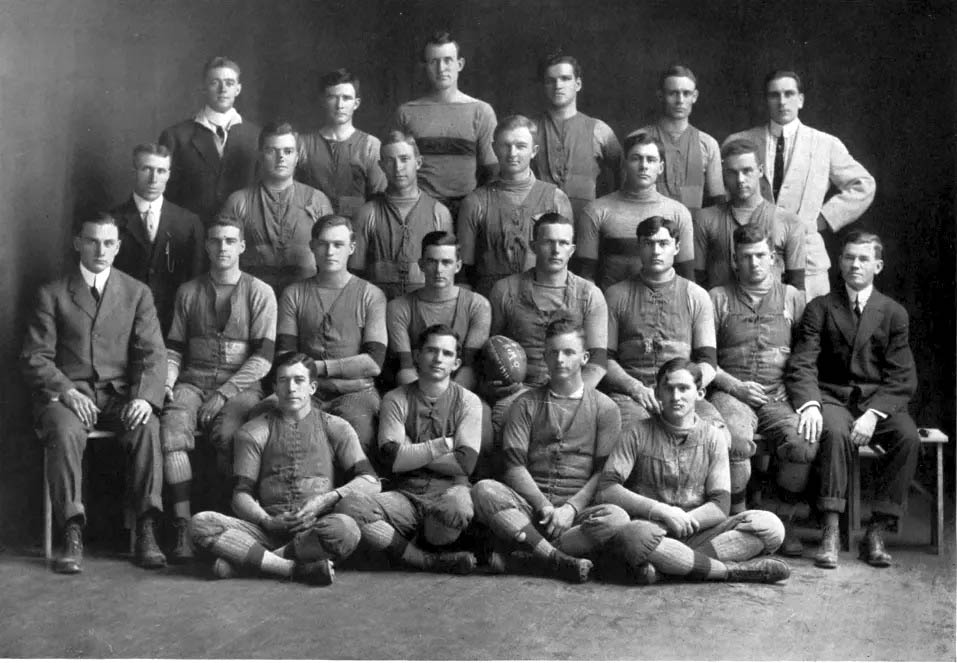

TIAA champion
- Conference: Independent
- Record: 5–2
- Head coach: Dave Allerdice (1st season)
- Captain: Marshall Ramsdell
- Home stadium: Clark Field

1911 Southern college football independents records
| | Conf. | | | Overall |
| Team | W | L | T | W | | L | | T |
|---|---|---|---|---|---|---|---|---|
| Oklahoma | | – | | 8 | – | 0 | – | 0 |
| Florida | | – | | 5 | – | 0 | – | 1 |
| VMI | | – | | 7 | – | 1 | – | 0 |
| Texas A&M | | – | | 6 | – | 1 | – | 0 |
| Georgetown | | – | | 7 | – | 1 | – | 1 |
| Navy | | – | | 6 | – | 0 | – | 3 |
| North Carolina | | – | | 6 | – | 1 | – | 1 |
| VPI | | – | | 6 | – | 1 | – | 2 |
| Virginia | | – | | 8 | – | 2 | – | 0 |
| Louisiana Industrial | | – | | 4 | – | 1 | – | 1 |
| Marshall | | – | | 4 | – | 1 | – | 1 |
| Arkansas | | – | | 6 | – | 2 | – | 1 |
| Oklahoma A&M | | – | | 5 | – | 2 | – | 0 |
| Texas | | – | | 5 | – | 2 | – | 0 |
| Washington and Lee | | – | | 4 | – | 2 | – | 2 |
| West Virginia | | – | | 6 | – | 3 | – | 0 |
| Davidson | | – | | 5 | – | 3 | – | 0 |
| North Carolina A&M | | – | | 5 | – | 3 | – | 0 |
| Chattanooga | | – | | 3 | – | 2 | – | 0 |
| Catholic University | | – | | 3 | – | 2 | – | 2 |
| Maryland | | – | | 4 | – | 4 | – | 2 |
| Baylor | | – | | 3 | – | 4 | – | 2 |
| Wake Forest | | – | | 3 | – | 5 | – | 0 |
| Delaware | | – | | 2 | – | 5 | – | 2 |
| South Carolina | | – | | 1 | – | 4 | – | 2 |
| Southwestern Louisiana Industrial | | – | | 1 | – | 4 | – | 1 |
| Spring Hill | | – | | 1 | – | 3 | – | 0 |
| Southwest Texas State | | – | | 1 | – | 3 | – | 0 |
| Stetson | | – | | 1 | – | 3 | – | 0 |
| Birmingham | | – | | 0 | – | 6 | – | 1 |
| Middle Tennessee State Normal | | – | | 0 | – | 1 | – | 0 |

The 1911 Texas Longhorns football team was an American football team that represented the University of Texas (now known as the University of Texas at Austin) as an independent during the 1911 college football season. In their first year under head coach Dave Allerdice, the Longhorns compiled an overall record of 5–2. They won the "state championship" by winning the Texas Intercollegiate Athletic Association championship that year.

== Schedule ==
| Date | Opponent | Site | Result | Source |
|---|---|---|---|---|
| October 13 | Southwestern (TX) | Clark Field; Austin, TX | W 11–2 | |
| October 21 | Baylor | Clark Field; Austin, TX (rivalry) | W 11–0 | |
| October 28 | Arkansas | Clark Field; Austin, TX (rivalry) | W 12–0 | |
| November 2 | Sewanee | Clark Field; Austin, TX | L 5–6 | |
| November 13 | vs. Texas A&M | West End Park; Houston, TX (rivalry) | W 6–0 | |
| November 17 | Auburn | Clark Field; Austin, TX | W 18–5 | |
| November 30 | Oklahoma | Clark Field; Austin, TX (rivalry) | L 3–6 | |
