= 1911 Spring Hill Badgers football team =

American college football season

1911 Spring Hill Badgers football
- Conference: Independent
- Record: 1–3
- Head coach: E. G. Maxon (5th season)
- Captain: Becker
- Home stadium: Campus Athletic Field

1911 Southern college football independents records
	Conf.			Overall
Team	W	L	T	W		L		T
Oklahoma		–		8	–	0	–	0
Florida		–		5	–	0	–	1
VMI		–		7	–	1	–	0
Texas A&M		–		6	–	1	–	0
Georgetown		–		7	–	1	–	1
Navy		–		6	–	0	–	3
North Carolina		–		6	–	1	–	1
VPI		–		6	–	1	–	2
Virginia		–		8	–	2	–	0
Louisiana Industrial		–		4	–	1	–	1
Marshall		–		4	–	1	–	1
Arkansas		–		6	–	2	–	1
Oklahoma A&M		–		5	–	2	–	0
Texas		–		5	–	2	–	0
Washington and Lee		–		4	–	2	–	2
West Virginia		–		6	–	3	–	0
Davidson		–		5	–	3	–	0
North Carolina A&M		–		5	–	3	–	0
Chattanooga		–		3	–	2	–	0
Catholic University		–		3	–	2	–	2
Maryland		–		4	–	4	–	2
Baylor		–		3	–	4	–	2
Wake Forest		–		3	–	5	–	0
Delaware		–		2	–	5	–	2
South Carolina		–		1	–	4	–	2
Southwestern Louisiana Industrial		–		1	–	4	–	1
Spring Hill		–		1	–	3	–	0
Southwest Texas State		–		1	–	3	–	0
Stetson		–		1	–	3	–	0
Birmingham		–		0	–	6	–	1
Middle Tennessee State Normal		–		0	–	1	–	0

The 1911 Spring Hill Badgers football team represented the Spring Hill College as an independent during the 1911 college football season. The team was coached by E. G. Maxon. The team played its games at Campus Athletic Field, later called Maxon Field. The season was an unfortunate one. The team "outplayed Marion, but lost the game out of sheer bad luck. Southern University won only by Spring Hill's failure to kick goal.

== Schedule ==
Date	Opponent	Site	Result
	Loyola (LA)		W 19–0
	Marion		L 6–12
	Southern		L 11–12
	Fort Morgan	Maxon Field; Mobile, AL	L 5–12
