= 1911 Oklahoma Sooners football team =

American college football season

1911 Oklahoma Sooners football
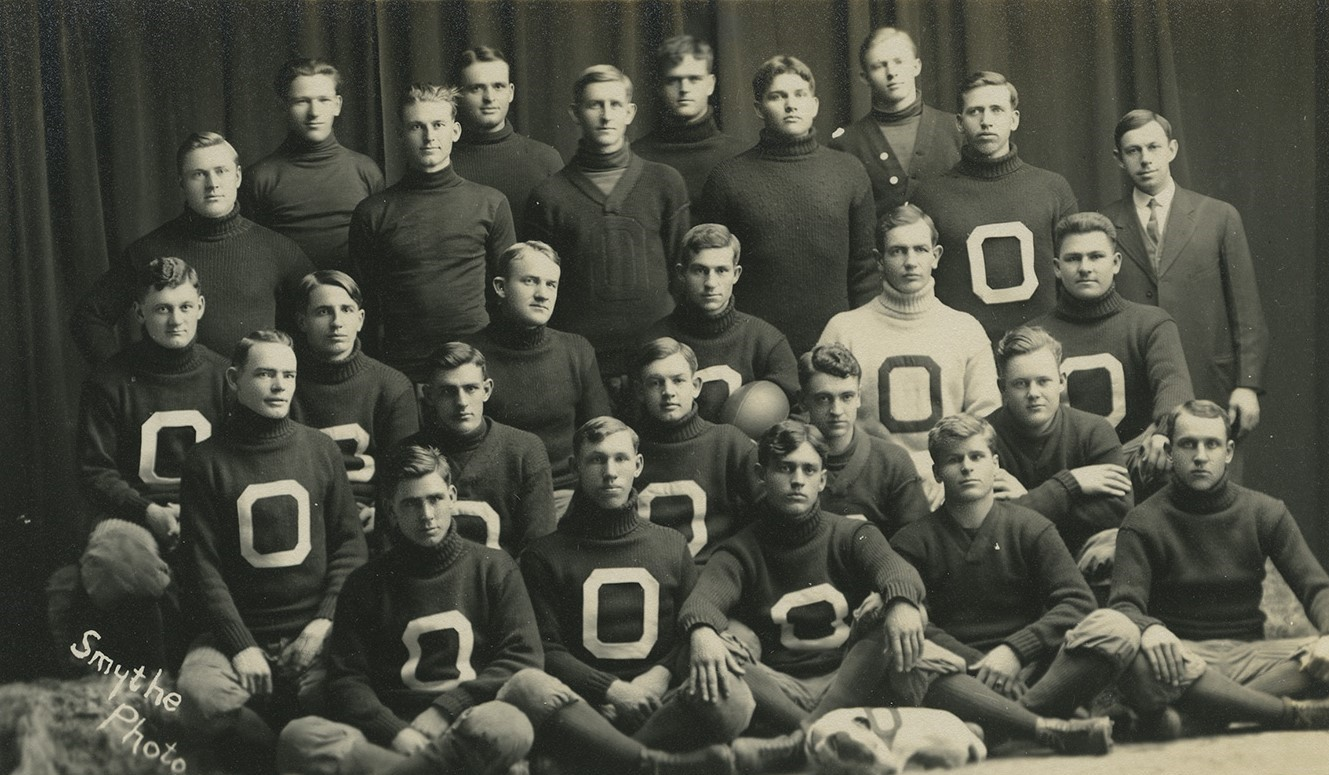
- Conference: Independent
- Record: 8–0
- Head coach: Bennie Owen (7th season)
- Captain: Frank Capshaw
- Home stadium: Boyd Field

1911 Southern college football independents records
	Conf.			Overall
Team	W	L	T	W		L		T
Oklahoma		–		8	–	0	–	0
Florida		–		5	–	0	–	1
VMI		–		7	–	1	–	0
Texas A&M		–		6	–	1	–	0
Georgetown		–		7	–	1	–	1
Navy		–		6	–	0	–	3
North Carolina		–		6	–	1	–	1
VPI		–		6	–	1	–	2
Virginia		–		8	–	2	–	0
Louisiana Industrial		–		4	–	1	–	1
Marshall		–		4	–	1	–	1
Arkansas		–		6	–	2	–	1
Oklahoma A&M		–		5	–	2	–	0
Texas		–		5	–	2	–	0
Washington and Lee		–		4	–	2	–	2
West Virginia		–		6	–	3	–	0
Davidson		–		5	–	3	–	0
North Carolina A&M		–		5	–	3	–	0
Chattanooga		–		3	–	2	–	0
Catholic University		–		3	–	2	–	2
Maryland		–		4	–	4	–	2
Baylor		–		3	–	4	–	2
Wake Forest		–		3	–	5	–	0
Delaware		–		2	–	5	–	2
South Carolina		–		1	–	4	–	2
Southwestern Louisiana Industrial		–		1	–	4	–	1
Spring Hill		–		1	–	3	–	0
Southwest Texas State		–		1	–	3	–	0
Stetson		–		1	–	3	–	0
Birmingham		–		0	–	6	–	1
Middle Tennessee State Normal		–		0	–	1	–	0

The 1911 Oklahoma Sooners football team represented the University of Oklahoma as an independent during the 1911 college football season. In their seventh year under head coach Bennie Owen, the Sooners compiled an 8–0 record, and outscored their opponents by a combined total of 282 to 15.

== Schedule ==
Date	Opponent	Site	Result	Attendance	Source
October 7	Kingfisher	Boyd Field; Norman, OK	W 104–0		
October 14	Phillips	Boyd Field; Norman, OK	W 62–0		
October 20	at Oklahoma A&M	Stillwater, OK (rivalry)	W 22–0		
October 27	Washburn	Boyd Field; Norman, OK	W 37–0		
November 4	at Missouri	Rollins Field; Columbia, MO (rivalry)	W 14–6		
November 11	at Kansas	McCook Field; Lawrence, KS	W 3–0	1,500	
November 22	Northwestern Oklahoma State	Boyd Field; Norman, OK	W 34–6		
November 30	at Texas	Clark Field; Austin, TX (rivalry)	W 6–3		
