= 1911 Marshall Thundering Herd football team =

American college football season

1911 Marshall Thundering Herd football
- Conference: Independent
- Record: 4–1–1
- Head coach: Boyd Chambers (3rd season)
- Captain: Harry Young
- Home stadium: Central Field

1911 Southern college football independents records
	Conf.			Overall
Team	W	L	T	W		L		T
Oklahoma		–		8	–	0	–	0
Florida		–		5	–	0	–	1
VMI		–		7	–	1	–	0
Texas A&M		–		6	–	1	–	0
Georgetown		–		7	–	1	–	1
Navy		–		6	–	0	–	3
North Carolina		–		6	–	1	–	1
VPI		–		6	–	1	–	2
Virginia		–		8	–	2	–	0
Louisiana Industrial		–		4	–	1	–	1
Marshall		–		4	–	1	–	1
Arkansas		–		6	–	2	–	1
Oklahoma A&M		–		5	–	2	–	0
Texas		–		5	–	2	–	0
Washington and Lee		–		4	–	2	–	2
West Virginia		–		6	–	3	–	0
Davidson		–		5	–	3	–	0
North Carolina A&M		–		5	–	3	–	0
Chattanooga		–		3	–	2	–	0
Catholic University		–		3	–	2	–	2
Maryland		–		4	–	4	–	2
Baylor		–		3	–	4	–	2
Wake Forest		–		3	–	5	–	0
Delaware		–		2	–	5	–	2
South Carolina		–		1	–	4	–	2
Southwestern Louisiana Industrial		–		1	–	4	–	1
Spring Hill		–		1	–	3	–	0
Southwest Texas State		–		1	–	3	–	0
Stetson		–		1	–	3	–	0
Birmingham		–		0	–	6	–	1
Middle Tennessee State Normal		–		0	–	1	–	0

The 1911 Marshall Thundering Herd football team represented Marshall College (now Marshall University) as an independent during the 1911 college football season. Marshall posted a 4–1–1 record, outscoring its opposition 122–22. Home games were played on a campus field called "Central Field" which is presently Campus Commons.

== Schedule ==
Date	Opponent	Site	Result
October 14	Marietta	Central Field; Huntington, WV	W 6–0
October 21	at Ohio	Athen, OH (rivalry)	T 5–5
October 28	at West Virginia	Morgantown, WV (rivalry)	L 15–17
November 4	Glenville	Central Field; Huntington, WV	W 32–0
November 18	West Virginia Wesleyan	Central Field; Huntington, WV	W 14–0
November 30	Georgetown (KY)^{†}	Central Field; Huntington, WV	W 50–0
^{†}Homecoming
