= 1911 Arkansas Razorbacks football team =

American college football season

1911 Arkansas Razorbacks football
- Conference: Independent
- Record: 6–2–1
- Head coach: Hugo Bezdek (4th season)
- Captain: Dan Estes
- Home stadium: The Hill

1911 Southern college football independents records
	Conf.			Overall
Team	W	L	T	W		L		T
Oklahoma		–		8	–	0	–	0
Florida		–		5	–	0	–	1
VMI		–		7	–	1	–	0
Texas A&M		–		6	–	1	–	0
Georgetown		–		7	–	1	–	1
Navy		–		6	–	0	–	3
North Carolina		–		6	–	1	–	1
VPI		–		6	–	1	–	2
Virginia		–		8	–	2	–	0
Louisiana Industrial		–		4	–	1	–	1
Marshall		–		4	–	1	–	1
Arkansas		–		6	–	2	–	1
Oklahoma A&M		–		5	–	2	–	0
Texas		–		5	–	2	–	0
Washington and Lee		–		4	–	2	–	2
West Virginia		–		6	–	3	–	0
Davidson		–		5	–	3	–	0
North Carolina A&M		–		5	–	3	–	0
Chattanooga		–		3	–	2	–	0
Catholic University		–		3	–	2	–	2
Maryland		–		4	–	4	–	2
Baylor		–		3	–	4	–	2
Wake Forest		–		3	–	5	–	0
Delaware		–		2	–	5	–	2
South Carolina		–		1	–	4	–	2
Southwestern Louisiana Industrial		–		1	–	4	–	1
Spring Hill		–		1	–	3	–	0
Southwest Texas State		–		1	–	3	–	0
Stetson		–		1	–	3	–	0
Birmingham		–		0	–	6	–	1
Middle Tennessee State Normal		–		0	–	1	–	0

The 1911 Arkansas Razorbacks football team represented the University of Arkansas during the 1911 college football season. In their fourth year under head coach Hugo Bezdek, the Razorbacks compiled a 6–2–1 record, shut out five of nine opponents, and outscored all opponents by a combined total of 268 to 23. The team's 100–0 victory over S.W. Missouri St. remains the highest single-game point total in Arkansas history.

== Schedule ==
Date	Time	Opponent	Site	Result	Attendance	Source
October 7		Springfield Normal	The Hill; Fayetteville, AR	W 100–0		
October 14		Drury	The Hill; Fayetteville, AR	W 65–5		
October 21		Hendrix	The Hill; Fayetteville, AR	W 45–0		
October 28		at Texas	Clark Field; Austin, TX (rivalry)	L 0–12		
October 30		at Southwestern (TX)	Georgetown, TX	T 0–0		
November 4		vs. Missouri Mines	Fort Smith, AR	W 44–3		
November 18	3:00 p.m.	vs. Kansas State	Gordon and Koppel Field; Kansas City, MO	L 0–3		
November 25	2:45 p.m.	at Washington University	Francis Field; St. Louis, MO	W 3–0	2,500	
November 30		LSU	West End Park; Little Rock, AR (rivalry)	W 11–0		
