= 1911 Wake Forest Baptists football team =

American college football season

1911 Wake Forest Baptists football
- Conference: Independent
- Record: 3–5
- Head coach: Frank Thompson (1st season)
- Captain: Carl Betts

1911 Southern college football independents records
	Conf.			Overall
Team	W	L	T	W		L		T
Oklahoma		–		8	–	0	–	0
Florida		–		5	–	0	–	1
VMI		–		7	–	1	–	0
Texas A&M		–		6	–	1	–	0
Georgetown		–		7	–	1	–	1
Navy		–		6	–	0	–	3
North Carolina		–		6	–	1	–	1
VPI		–		6	–	1	–	2
Virginia		–		8	–	2	–	0
Louisiana Industrial		–		4	–	1	–	1
Marshall		–		4	–	1	–	1
Arkansas		–		6	–	2	–	1
Oklahoma A&M		–		5	–	2	–	0
Texas		–		5	–	2	–	0
Washington and Lee		–		4	–	2	–	2
West Virginia		–		6	–	3	–	0
Davidson		–		5	–	3	–	0
North Carolina A&M		–		5	–	3	–	0
Chattanooga		–		3	–	2	–	0
Catholic University		–		3	–	2	–	2
Maryland		–		4	–	4	–	2
Baylor		–		3	–	4	–	2
Wake Forest		–		3	–	5	–	0
Delaware		–		2	–	5	–	2
South Carolina		–		1	–	4	–	2
Southwestern Louisiana Industrial		–		1	–	4	–	1
Spring Hill		–		1	–	3	–	0
Southwest Texas State		–		1	–	3	–	0
Stetson		–		1	–	3	–	0
Birmingham		–		0	–	6	–	1
Middle Tennessee State Normal		–		0	–	1	–	0

The 1911 Wake Forest Baptists football team was an American football team that represented Wake Forest College as an independent during the 1911 college football season. In its first season under head coach Frank Thompson, the team compiled a 3–5 record (1–5 in intercollegiate games). The team played its home games in Wake Forest, North Carolina

== Schedule ==
Date	Opponent	Site	Result	Source
September 30	Warrenton High School	Wake Forest, NC	W 61–0	
October 7	at North Carolina	Campus Athletic Field; Chapel Hill, NC (rivalry)	L 3–12	
October 14	Roanoke	Wake Forest, NC	W 53–0	
October 21	at Washington and Lee	Wilson Field; Lexington, VA	L 5–18	
November 4	at Virginia	Madison Hall Field; Charlottesville, VA	L 6–29	
November 11	vs. Davidson	Cone Athletic Park (II); Greensboro, NC	L 0–9	
November 18	North Carolina A&M	Wake Forest, NC (rivalry)	L 6–13	
November 23	vs. Training Ship Franklin	Durham Athletic Grounds; Durham, NC	W 26–0	
