= 1911 VMI Keydets football team =

American college football season

1911 VMI Keydets football
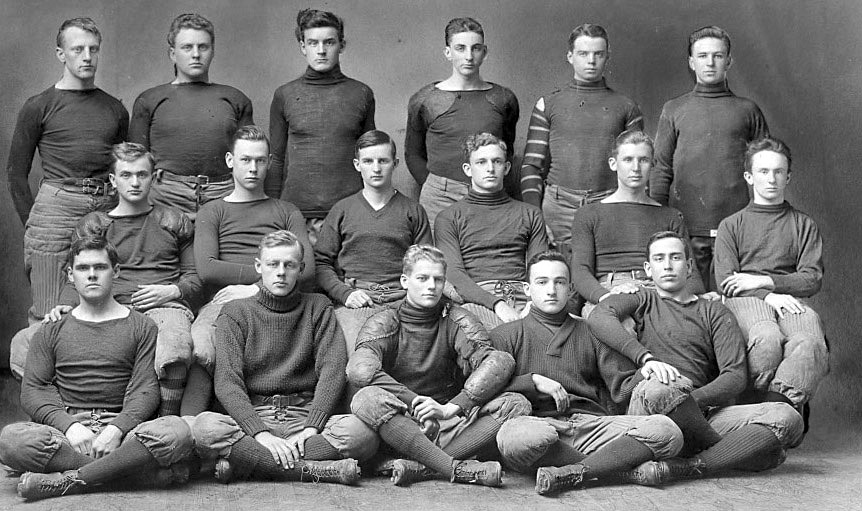
- Conference: Independent
- Record: 7–1
- Head coach: Alpha Brumage (1st season)

1911 Southern college football independents records
	Conf.			Overall
Team	W	L	T	W		L		T
Oklahoma		–		8	–	0	–	0
Florida		–		5	–	0	–	1
VMI		–		7	–	1	–	0
Texas A&M		–		6	–	1	–	0
Georgetown		–		7	–	1	–	1
Navy		–		6	–	0	–	3
North Carolina		–		6	–	1	–	1
VPI		–		6	–	1	–	2
Virginia		–		8	–	2	–	0
Louisiana Industrial		–		4	–	1	–	1
Marshall		–		4	–	1	–	1
Arkansas		–		6	–	2	–	1
Oklahoma A&M		–		5	–	2	–	0
Texas		–		5	–	2	–	0
Washington and Lee		–		4	–	2	–	2
West Virginia		–		6	–	3	–	0
Davidson		–		5	–	3	–	0
North Carolina A&M		–		5	–	3	–	0
Chattanooga		–		3	–	2	–	0
Catholic University		–		3	–	2	–	2
Maryland		–		4	–	4	–	2
Baylor		–		3	–	4	–	2
Wake Forest		–		3	–	5	–	0
Delaware		–		2	–	5	–	2
South Carolina		–		1	–	4	–	2
Southwestern Louisiana Industrial		–		1	–	4	–	1
Spring Hill		–		1	–	3	–	0
Southwest Texas State		–		1	–	3	–	0
Stetson		–		1	–	3	–	0
Birmingham		–		0	–	6	–	1
Middle Tennessee State Normal		–		0	–	1	–	0

The 1911 VMI Keydets football team represented the Virginia Military Institute (VMI) in their 21st season of organized football. First-year head coach Alpha Brumage lead the 7–1 Keydets to their most wins in school history.

== Schedule ==
Date	Time	Opponent	Site	Result	Source
September 29		Augusta Military Academy	VMI Parade Ground; Lexington, VA	W 38–0	
October 7	3:30 p.m.	vs. Davidson	Roanoke Fair Grounds; Roanoke, VA	W 5–0	
October 14	3:30 p.m.	North Carolina A&M	VMI Parade Ground; Lexington, VA	W 6–5	
October 21		Randolph–Macon	VMI Parade Ground; Lexington, VA	W 25–0	
October 28		at Virginia	Madison Hall Field; Charlottesville, VA	L 6–22	
November 4		Richmond	VMI Parade Ground; Lexington, VA (rivalry)	W 38–0	
November 18		Catholic University	VMI Parade Ground; Lexington, VA	W 80–0	
November 30		vs. St. John's (MD)	Roanoke Fair Grounds; Roanoke, VA	W 5–0	
