= Bob Winston (American football) =

American football player and politician (1891–1970)

Profile
- Position: End

Personal information
- Born: December 17, 1891; Oxford, North Carolina, U.S.
- Died: August 10, 1970 (aged 78); Raleigh, North Carolina, U.S.

Career information
- College: North Carolina (1911–1914)

Awards and highlights
- All-Southern (1914)

Robert Watson Winston Jr. (December 17, 1891 – August 10, 1970) was an American college football player and politician from North Carolina.

== College football ==
Winston was an All-Southern college football end for the North Carolina Tar Heels of the University of North Carolina, captain of its 1911 team. He was selected for the 1914 College Football All-Southern Team by Dick Jemison. Kemp Plummer Battle recalls he was a good player but shifted around the line too much for his own good. He was once in charge of athletics at Bingham Military School in Asheville.

== Career ==
Winston represented Wake County in the North Carolina General Assembly in the North Carolina House of Representatives of 1917. Winston resigned from the General Assembly so that he could serve in the United States Army during World War I. In 1949, he was named chairman of the State Board of Alcohol Control. He also practiced law with his father and owned a farm.
