= 1911 college football season =

American college football season

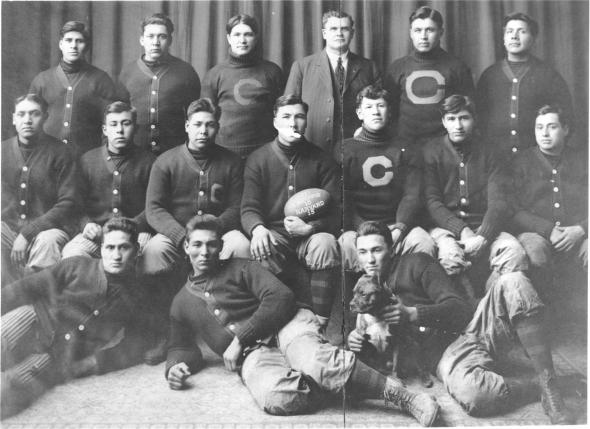
- 1911 Carlisle Indians
- Champion(s): Princeton

The 1911 college football season was the last one before major reforms were made to the American game in 1912. In 1911, touchdowns were worth five points, the field was 110 yards in length, and a team had three downs within which to advance the ball ten yards. The United States Naval Academy (Navy) finished with a record of 6 wins and 3 ties (6–0–3). Two of the ties were 0–0 games with the other major unbeaten teams, Penn State (8–0–1) and Princeton (8–0–2). Other teams that finished the season unbeaten were Minnesota (6–0–1), Florida (5–0–1) and Oklahoma (8-0).

At the end of the season Princeton was named as the year's champion by The New York Times. The Helms Athletic Foundation, founded in 1936, declared retroactively that Princeton had been the best team of 1911.

== Rules ==
The rules for American football in 1911 included:

- Field 110 yards in length
- Kickoff made from midfield
- Three downs to gain ten yards
- Touchdown worth 5 points
- Field goal worth 3 points
- Forward pass legal, but subject to penalties:

A pass could not be caught beyond the goal line, nor more than 20 yards beyond the line of scrimmage.

== Conference and program changes ==
School	1910 Conference	1911 Conference
First District Agricultural Indians	Program Established	Independent
Iowa Hawkeyes	MVIAA & Western	Big Nine
Middle Tennessee State Normal football	Program Established	Independent
Mississippi College Choctaws	Independent	SIAA
Southern California Methodists	Independent	Dropped Program

== September ==
=== September 23 ===
- Carlisle beat Lebanon Valley 53–0, and in a Wednesday (Sep. 27) game beat Muhlenberg 32–0
- Lafayette beat Bloomsburg College 53–0
- Brown beat New Hampshire 56–0

=== September 30 ===
- Brown beat Rhode Island 12–0
- Princeton beat Stevens 37–0, and three days later, beat Rutgers 37–0
- Carlisle beat Dickinson 17–0
- Lafayette beat Ursinus College 3–0
- Penn State beat Geneva College 57–0
- Arkansas beat visiting Southwest Missouri State College, 100–0
- Georgia beat Alabama Presbyterian 51–0
- Minnesota opened its season with a 5–0 win over Iowa State.
- Vanderbilt opened with a 40–0 win over visiting Birmingham College
- Harvard beat Bates 15–0

== October ==
=== October 7 ===
- Navy beat Johns Hopkins 27–5, and on Wednesday the 11th, beat St. John's College of Maryland, 21–0
- Princeton beat Villanova 31–0 and on October 11, played Lehigh to a 6–6 tie
- Carlisle beat Mount St. Mary's 46–5
- Penn State beat Gettysburg 31–0
- Army beat Vermont 12–0
- After a 39–0 win against the Seamen Gunners, Georgetown beat William & Mary 66–0
- Harvard beat Holy Cross 8–0
- Michigan beat Case 24–0
- Minnesota beat South Dakota 5–0
- Chicago beat Indiana 23–6
- Texas A&M beat Southwestern 22–0.
- Vanderbilt beat Maryville 46–0
- Florida beat The Citadel 15–3
- Georgia beat South Carolina 38–0
- Oklahoma beat Kingfisher 104–0

=== October 14 ===
- Carlisle (4–0) won at Georgetown 28–5
- Navy beat Washington & Jefferson 16–0
- Penn State won 5–0 at Cornell
- Army beat Rutgers 18–0
- Texas A&M beat Austin College 33–0
- Vanderbilt beat visiting Rose-Hulman Institute 33–0 and *Georgia defeated Alabama at Birmingham, 11–3
- Harvard beat Williams 18–0
- Michigan won 15–3 at Michigan State.
- Chicago beat Purdue 11–3
- Princeton beat Colgate 31–0

=== October 21 ===
- At Annapolis, Navy and Princeton played to a 0–0 tie.
- Carlisle won at Pittsburgh 17–0
- Harvard defeated Amherst 11–0
- Penn State beat Villanova 18–0
- Army beat Yale 6–0
- Florida and South Carolina played to a 6–6 tie, and three days later, the Gators won at Clemson, 6–5.
- Vanderbilt beat visiting Centre College 45–0; in its first four games, Vandy had outscored its opposition 164–0.
- Georgia beat visiting Sewanee 12–3.
- Texas A&M beat Auburn 16–0
- Michigan beat Ohio State 19–0
- Georgetown won at Richmond 65–0
- Minnesota stayed unbeaten with a 21–3 win over Nebraska
- Chicago defeated Illinois 24–0

=== October 28 ===
- In an intersectional meeting of unbeaten teams, Michigan edged visiting Vanderbilt, 9–8
- Navy and Western Reserve played to a 0–0 tie.
- Carlisle beat Lafayette 19–0
- At Philadelphia, Penn State beat Pennsylvania, 22–6.
- Army beat Lehigh 20–0
- Georgetown beat St. John's College of Maryland, 20–0.
- Princeton beat Holy Cross 20–0
- Minnesota won at Iowa 24–6.
- Wisconsin, after shutouts against Lawrence (15–0), and Ripon (24–0) *Colorado College (26–0) won at Northwestern 28–3
- Harvard was defeated by visiting Brown, 20–6
- Georgia beat Mercer 8–5
- In a Friday game, Texas A&M beat Ole Miss, 17–0

== November ==
=== November 4 ===
- Army and Georgetown played to a 0–0 tie.
- Carlisle won its 8th game, 16–0 over Penn.
- Michigan and Syracuse played to a 6–6 tie.
- Navy beat North Carolina State 17–6
- Penn State beat St. Bonaventure 46–0
- Princeton beat (5–0) Harvard 8–6
- Minnesota (5–0) hosted Chicago (3–0) and won 30–0
- Wisconsin beat Iowa 12–0
- Vanderbilt beat visiting (5–0–0) Georgia 17–0. Georgia beat Clemson three days later at Augusta, 22–0
- Florida beat visiting Columbia College 9–0 in a Friday game.

=== November 11 ===
- Carlisle (8–0) handed Harvard (5–1) its second straight loss, winning 18–15
- Navy beat West Virginia 32–0.
- Army was scored upon for the first time in six games, as it beat Bucknell 20–2.
- Michigan (4–0–1) lost at Cornell, 6–0
- Chicago won at Northwestern 9–3
- Penn State beat Colgate 17–9
- Princeton beat Dartmouth 3–0
- Florida won at Stetson 27–0
- Vanderbilt beat Kentucky 18–0
- On Monday the 13th, Texas A&M lost to Texas 6–0

=== November 18 ===
- At Annapolis, Penn State (7–0–0) and Navy (5–0–2) played to a 0–0 tie.
- Syracuse handed Carlisle its first defeat, winning 12–11
- Michigan beat Penn 11–9
- Princeton beat Yale 6–3 to close its season at 8–0–2
- Army beat Colgate 12–6
- Georgetown beat Virginia 28–3
- The Army–Navy Game was played in Philadelphia on Friday, November 24, between unbeatens, (5–0–3) Navy and (6–0–1) Army, with Navy winning 3–0
- Minnesota (5–0–0) and Wisconsin (5–0–1) played to a 6–6 tie.
- Chicago beat Cornell 6–0
- Vanderbilt beat Ole Miss 21–0.
- Georgia beat Georgia Tech 5–0
- Harvard beat Dartmouth 5–3.

=== November 25 ===
- Minnesota beat Illinois 11–0
- Chicago beat Wisconsin 5–0
- Michigan and Nebraska 6–6 tie
- Carlisle won at Johns Hopkins, 29–6
- Harvard and Yale played to 0–0 tie.
- Kansas travels to Missouri for a 3–3 tie in what is widely considered the first homecoming game. More than 1,000 people gathered in downtown Lawrence, Kansas, to watch a mechanical reproduction of the game while it was being played with the information reported by telegraph.

=== November 29 ===
- On Wednesday, November 29, in Savannah, Georgia and Auburn played to a 0–0 tie.

=== November 30 (Thanksgiving) ===
- Penn State won at Pittsburgh 3–0, to finish the season 8–0–1.
- Carlisle closed its season with a 12–6 win at Brown.
- Georgetown beat Lehigh 28–3.
- Florida beat Charleston 21–0.
- Vanderbilt defeated visiting Sewanee 31–0.

== January 1912 ==
The last five-point American football touchdown was scored on January 1, 1912, in a game played in Havana, Cuba. Mississippi A&M College (now Mississippi State University) defeated the Club Atletico de Cuba, 12–0.

== Conference standings ==
=== Major conference standings ===
1911 Missouri Valley Conference football standings
	Conf.					Overall
Team	W		L		T	W		L		T
Iowa State +	2	–	0	–	1	6	–	1	–	1
Nebraska +	2	–	0	–	1	5	–	1	–	2
Kansas	1	–	1	–	1	4	–	2	–	2
Washington University	0	–	0	–	2	4	–	2	–	2
Missouri	0	–	2	–	2	2	–	4	–	2
Drake	0	–	2	–	1	5	–	2	–	1
+ – Conference co-champions

1911 Rocky Mountain Conference football standings
	Conf.					Overall
Team	W		L		T	W		L		T
Colorado $	5	–	0	–	0	6	–	0	–	0
Utah	3	–	1	–	1	5	–	1	–	1
Denver	3	–	1	–	1	5	–	2	–	1
Colorado College	3	–	2	–	0	4	–	3	–	0
Wyoming	2	–	3	–	0	4	–	3	–	1
Colorado Mines	1	–	5	–	0	2	–	5	–	0
Colorado Agricultural	0	–	5	–	0	0	–	6	–	0
$ – Conference champion

1911 Southern Intercollegiate Athletic Association football standings
	Conf.					Overall
Team	W		L		T	W		L		T
Vanderbilt $	5	–	0	–	0	8	–	1	–	0
Auburn	4	–	0	–	1	4	–	2	–	1
Georgia	5	–	1	–	1	7	–	1	–	1
Georgia Tech	5	–	2	–	1	6	–	2	–	1
Kentucky State	2	–	1	–	0	7	–	3	–	0
LSU	2	–	1	–	0	6	–	3	–	0
Mississippi A&M	4	–	2	–	1	7	–	2	–	1
Alabama	2	–	2	–	2	5	–	2	–	2
Ole Miss	2	–	2	–	0	6	–	3	–	0
Tulane	3	–	3	–	0	5	–	3	–	1
Sewanee	2	–	3	–	0	6	–	3	–	1
Clemson	2	–	4	–	0	3	–	5	–	0
The Citadel	1	–	1	–	0	5	–	2	–	2
Mercer	2	–	5	–	0	4	–	6	–	1
Central University	0	–	2	–	1	3	–	2	–	1
Tennessee	0	–	2	–	1	3	–	4	–	2
Mississippi College	0	–	4	–	0	1	–	5	–	0
Howard (AL)	0	–	6	–	0	1	–	6	–	1
$ – Conference champion

1911 Western Conference football standings
	Conf.					Overall
Team	W		L		T	W		L		T
Minnesota $	3	–	0	–	1	6	–	0	–	1
Chicago	5	–	1	–	0	6	–	1	–	0
Wisconsin	2	–	1	–	1	5	–	1	–	1
Illinois	2	–	2	–	1	4	–	2	–	1
Iowa	2	–	2	–	0	3	–	4	–	0
Purdue	1	–	3	–	0	3	–	4	–	0
Northwestern	1	–	4	–	0	3	–	4	–	0
Indiana	0	–	3	–	1	3	–	3	–	1
$ – Conference champion

=== Independents ===
1911 Eastern college football independents records
	Conf.			Overall
Team	W	L	T	W		L		T
Penn State		–		8	–	0	–	1
Carlisle		–		11	–	1	–	0
Princeton		–		8	–	0	–	2
Trinity (CT)		–		6	–	0	–	2
Temple		–		6	–	1	–	0
Army		–		6	–	1	–	1
Swarthmore		–		6	–	1	–	1
Dartmouth		–		8	–	2	–	0
Lafayette		–		8	–	2	–	0
Yale		–		7	–	2	–	1
Harvard		–		6	–	2	–	1
Cornell		–		7	–	3	–	0
Rhode Island State		–		5	–	2	–	1
Brown		–		7	–	3	–	1
Bucknell		–		6	–	3	–	1
Penn		–		7	–	4	–	0
Pittsburgh		–		4	–	3	–	1
Washington & Jefferson		–		6	–	4	–	0
Syracuse		–		5	–	3	–	2
Dickinson		–		4	–	4	–	0
Lehigh		–		5	–	5	–	1
Rutgers		–		4	–	4	–	1
Dickinson		–		4	–	4	–	0
St. Bonaventure		–		2	–	2	–	0
Carnegie Tech		–		4	–	5	–	0
Holy Cross		–		4	–	5	–	0
Tufts		–		3	–	4	–	0
Vermont		–		3	–	5	–	0
NYU		–		1	–	3	–	3
Colgate		–		3	–	6	–	0
Franklin & Marshall		–		3	–	6	–	0
New Hampshire		–		1	–	5	–	1
Geneva		–		1	–	6	–	1
Villanova		–		0	–	5	–	1
Boston College		–		0	–	7	–	0

1911 Midwestern college football independents records
	Conf.			Overall
Team	W	L	T	W		L		T
Marquette		–		7	–	0	–	2
Notre Dame		–		6	–	0	–	2
Fairmount		–		7	–	1	–	0
South Dakota		–		7	–	1	–	0
Michigan Agricultural		–		5	–	1	–	0
Northern Illinois State		–		8	–	2	–	1
Saint Louis		–		6	–	1	–	1
Lake Forest		–		5	–	1	–	1
Mount Union		–		7	–	2	–	0
Michigan		–		5	–	1	–	2
North Dakota Agricultural		–		3	–	1	–	0
St. Viator		–		4	–	2	–	0
Haskell		–		4	–	2	–	3
Iowa State Teachers		–		3	–	2	–	1
Ohio Northern		–		5	–	4	–	0
Detroit		–		4	–	4	–	0
Central Michigan		–		3	–	3	–	0
South Dakota State		–		4	–	4	–	0
St. Mary's (OH)		–		3	–	3	–	1
Wabash		–		3	–	3	–	1
Buchtel		–		3	–	4	–	1
Butler		–		3	–	4	–	1
Carthage		–		3	–	4	–	1
Doane		–		3	–	4	–	0
Michigan State Normal		–		3	–	4	–	0
Heidelberg		–		2	–	3	–	1
Western State Normal		–		2	–	3	–	0
Loyola (IL)		–		2	–	5	–	0

1911 Southern college football independents records
	Conf.			Overall
Team	W	L	T	W		L		T
Oklahoma		–		8	–	0	–	0
Florida		–		5	–	0	–	1
VMI		–		7	–	1	–	0
Texas A&M		–		6	–	1	–	0
Georgetown		–		7	–	1	–	1
Navy		–		6	–	0	–	3
North Carolina		–		6	–	1	–	1
VPI		–		6	–	1	–	2
Virginia		–		8	–	2	–	0
Louisiana Industrial		–		4	–	1	–	1
Marshall		–		4	–	1	–	1
Arkansas		–		6	–	2	–	1
Oklahoma A&M		–		5	–	2	–	0
Texas		–		5	–	2	–	0
Washington and Lee		–		4	–	2	–	2
West Virginia		–		6	–	3	–	0
Davidson		–		5	–	3	–	0
North Carolina A&M		–		5	–	3	–	0
Chattanooga		–		3	–	2	–	0
Catholic University		–		3	–	2	–	2
Maryland		–		4	–	4	–	2
Baylor		–		3	–	4	–	2
Wake Forest		–		3	–	5	–	0
Delaware		–		2	–	5	–	2
South Carolina		–		1	–	4	–	2
Southwestern Louisiana Industrial		–		1	–	4	–	1
Spring Hill		–		1	–	3	–	0
Southwest Texas State		–		1	–	3	–	0
Stetson		–		1	–	3	–	0
Birmingham		–		0	–	6	–	1
Middle Tennessee State Normal		–		0	–	1	–	0

1911 Western college football independents records
	Conf.			Overall
Team	W	L	T	W		L		T
New Mexico A&M		–		7	–	0	–	0
Utah Agricultural		–		4	–	0	–	1
Arizona		–		3	–	1	–	1
Montana		–		2	–	1	–	0
Hawaii		–		2	–	2	–	0
New Mexico		–		1	–	3	–	1

=== Minor conferences ===
Conference	Champion(s)	Record
Kansas Collegiate Athletic Conference	Fairmount College	6–1
Michigan Intercollegiate Athletic Association	Olivet; Adrian	4–0; 3–0
Ohio Athletic Conference	Oberlin	4–0–1

=== Minor conference standings ===
1911 Illinois Intercollegiate Athletic Conference football standings
	Conf.					Overall
Team	W		L		T	W		L		T
Southern Illinois		–		–		3	–	4	–	0

1911 Ohio Athletic Conference football standings
	Conf.					Overall
Team	W		L		T	W		L		T
Oberlin $	4	–	0	–	1	6	–	1	–	1
Case	5	–	1	–	1	5	–	2	–	1
Ohio Wesleyan	6	–	2	–	0	6	–	3	–	0
Ohio State	4	–	1	–	2	5	–	3	–	2
Cincinnati	2	–	1	–	1	6	–	2	–	1
Denison	3	–	2	–	2	6	–	2	–	2
Western Reserve	1	–	3	–	2	4	–	3	–	4
Ohio	1	–	2	–	0	3	–	3	–	2
Miami (OH)	1	–	3	–	1	2	–	4	–	2
Wittenberg	1	–	4	–	0	3	–	6	–	0
Kenyon	0	–	6	–	0	1	–	7	–	1
Wooster	0	–	4	–	0	0	–	6	–	0
$ – Conference champion

== Awards and honors ==
=== All-Americans ===
The consensus All-America team included:

Position	Name	Height	Weight (lbs.)	Class	Hometown	Team
QB	Art Howe	5'10"	153	Sr.	South Orange, New Jersey	Yale
QB	Earl Sprackling	5'9"	150	Sr.	Cleveland, Ohio	Brown
HB	Percy Wendell			Jr.	Roxbury, Massachusetts	Harvard
HB	Jim Thorpe	6'1"	180	Jr.	Shawnee, Oklahoma	Carlisle
FB	John Dalton	5'11"	174	Sr.	St. Louis, Missouri	Penn
E	Sanford White			Sr.	Fall River, Massachusetts	Princeton
T	Ed Hart	5'11"	208	Sr.	Exeter, New Hampshire	Princeton
G	Bob Fisher			Sr.	Boston, Massachusetts	Harvard
C	Hank Ketcham	6'0"	175	So.	Englewood, New Jersey	Yale
G	Joseph Duff			Sr.	Pittsburgh, Pennsylvania	Princeton
T	Leland Devore	6'4"	225	Jr.	Wheeling, West Virginia	Army
E	Doug Bomeisler	5'11"	190	Jr.	Brooklyn, New York	Yale

== Statistical leaders ==
- Rushing yards leader: Jim Thorpe, Carlisle, 899
- Rushing avg. leader: Jim Thorpe, 8.0
