= 1911 Southern Intercollegiate Athletic Association football season =

- League: NCAA
- Sport: College football
- Duration: September 23, 1911 through January 1, 1912
- Teams: 17

Regular Season
- Season champions: Vanderbilt

Football seasons
- ← 1910 1912 →

1911 Southern Intercollegiate Athletic Association football standings
	Conf.					Overall
Team	W		L		T	W		L		T
Vanderbilt $	5	–	0	–	0	8	–	1	–	0
Auburn	4	–	0	–	1	4	–	2	–	1
Georgia	5	–	1	–	1	7	–	1	–	1
Georgia Tech	5	–	2	–	1	6	–	2	–	1
Kentucky State	2	–	1	–	0	7	–	3	–	0
LSU	2	–	1	–	0	6	–	3	–	0
Mississippi A&M	4	–	2	–	1	7	–	2	–	1
Alabama	2	–	2	–	2	5	–	2	–	2
Ole Miss	2	–	2	–	0	6	–	3	–	0
Tulane	3	–	3	–	0	5	–	3	–	1
Sewanee	2	–	3	–	0	6	–	3	–	1
Clemson	2	–	4	–	0	3	–	5	–	0
The Citadel	1	–	1	–	0	5	–	2	–	2
Mercer	2	–	5	–	0	4	–	6	–	1
Central University	0	–	2	–	1	3	–	2	–	1
Tennessee	0	–	2	–	1	3	–	4	–	2
Mississippi College	0	–	4	–	0	1	–	5	–	0
Howard (AL)	0	–	6	–	0	1	–	6	–	1
$ – Conference champion

The 1911 Southern Intercollegiate Athletic Association football season was the college football games played by the member schools of the Southern Intercollegiate Athletic Association as part of the 1911 college football season. The season began on September 23.

Edwin Pope's Football's Greatest Coaches notes: "A lightning-swift backfield of Lew Hardage, Wilson Collins, Ammie Sikes, and Ray Morrison pushed Vandy through 1911 with only a 9–8 loss to Michigan." The Atlanta Constitution voted Vanderbilt's the best backfield in the South. Morrison is considered one of the best quarterbacks in Vanderbilt's long history.

Tulane reapplied for SIAA membership in late 1910, having withdrawn previously.

== Regular season ==
Index to colors and formatting
Non-conference matchup; SIAA member won
Non-conference matchup; SIAA member lost
Non-conference matchup; tie
Conference matchup

SIAA teams in bold.

=== Week One ===
Date	Visiting team	Home team	Site	Result	Attendance	Reference
September 23	Locust Grove Institute	**Mercer**	Central City Park • Macon, GA	**W** 25–0		

=== Week Two ===
Date	Visiting team	Home team	Site	Result	Attendance	Reference
September 29	**Mississippi College**	Mississippi A&M	Hardy Field • Starkville, MS	**MSA&M** 27–6		
September 30	**Howard (AL)**	Alabama	The Quad • Tuscaloosa, AL	**ALA** 24–0		
September 30	Alabama Presbyterian	Georgia	Sanford Field • Athens, GA	**W** 51–0		
September 30	11th Cavalry	Georgia Tech	Piedmont Park • Atlanta, GA	**W** 22–5		
September 30	Maryville (TN)	Kentucky State	Stoll Field • Lexington, KY	**W** 13–0		
September 30	Memphis High School	Ole Miss	University Field • Oxford, MS	**W** 42–0		
September 30	Sewanee Military Academy	Sewanee	Hardee Field • Sewanee, TN	**W** 16–0		
September 30	Birmingham	Vanderbilt	Dudley Field • Nashville, TN	**W** 23–0		
September 30	Charleston Navy	The Citadel	College Park Stadium • Charleston, SC	**T** 0–0		
September 30	Gordon	Mercer	Central City Park • Macon, GA	**W** 12–0		

=== Week Three ===
Date	Visiting team	Home team	Site	Result	Attendance	Reference
October 5	Southwestern Presbyterian	**Ole Miss**	University Field • Oxford, MS	**W** 41–0		
October 7	Southwestern Presbyterian	**Mississippi A&M**	Hardy Field • Starkville, MS	**W** 30–0		
October 7	Birmingham	**Alabama**	The Quad • Tuscaloosa, AL	**W** 47–5		
October 7	**Mercer**	**Auburn**	Drake Field • Auburn, AL	**AUB** 29–0		
October 7	**The Citadel**	Florida	University Athletic Field • Gainesville, FL	**L** 15–3		
October 7	South Carolina	**Georgia**	Sanford Field • Athens, GA	**W** 38–0		
October 7	**Georgia Tech**	**Howard (AL)**	Alabama State Fairgrounds • Birmingham, AL	**GT** 28–0		
October 7	Morris Harvey	**Kentucky State**	Stoll Field • Lexington, KY	**W** 12–0		
October 7	Southern (AL)	**Mississippi College**	Clinton, MS	**W** 5–0		
October 7	Murfreesboro School for Boys	**Sewanee**	Hardee Field • Sewanee, TN	**W** 20–0		
October 7	Maryville (TN)	**Vanderbilt**	Dudley Field • Nashville, TN	**W** 46–0		
October 7	Southwestern Louisiana	**LSU**	State Field • Baton Rouge, LA	**W** 42–0		

=== Week Four ===
Date	Visiting team	Home team	Site	Result	Attendance	Reference
October 11	Morgan Training School	**Sewanee**	Haedee Field • Sewanee, TN	**T** 0–0		
October 12	**Mississippi College**	**Tulane**	Tulane Stadium • New Orleans, LA	**TUL** 10–0		
October 13	Louisiana Industrial	**Ole Miss**	University Field • Oxford, MS	**W** 15–0		
October 14	**Auburn**	**Clemson**	Bowman Field • Calhoun, SC	**AUB** 29–0		
October 14	**The Citadel**	**Mercer**	Savannah, GA	**CIT** 5–0		
October 14	**Georgia**	**Alabama**	Alabama State Fairgrounds • Birmingham, AL	**UGA** 11–3		
October 14	**Tennessee**	**Georgia Tech**	Ponce de Leon Park • Atlanta, GA	**GT** 24–0		
October 14	**Howard (AL)**	**Mississippi A&M**	Hardy Field • Starkville, MS	**MSA&M** 48–0		
October 14	**Kentucky State**	Miami (OH)	Oxford, OH	**W** 12–0		
October 14	Castle Heights	**Sewanee**	Hardee Field • Sewanee, TN	**W** 25–0		
October 14	Louisiana Normal	**LSU**	State Field • Baton Rouge, LA	**W** 46–0		
October 14	Rose Polytechnic	**Vanderbilt**	Dudley Field • Nashville, TN	**W** 33–0		
October 14	Central University Alumni	**Central University**	Cheek Field • Danville, KY	**W** 30–0		

=== Week Five ===
Date	Visiting team	Home team	Site	Result	Attendance	Reference
October 18	Southwestern Louisiana	**Tulane**	Tulane Stadium • New Orleans, LA	**W** 27–0		
October 20	**Mississippi College**	**LSU**	State Field • Baton Rouge, LA	**LSU** 40–0		
October 21	**Alabama**	**Mississippi A&M**	Columbus Fairgrounds • Columbus, MS	**T** 6–6		
October 21	**Central University**	**Vanderbilt**	Dudley Field • Nashville, TN	**VAN** 45–0		
October 21	**Howard (AL)**	**Clemson**	Bowman Field • Calhoun, SC	**CLEM** 15–0		
October 21	**Sewanee**	**Georgia**	Sanford Field • Athens, GA	**UGA** 12–3		
October 21	**Mercer**	**Georgia Tech**	Ponce de Leon Park • Atlanta, GA	**GT** 17–0		
October 21	Lexington High School	**Kentucky State**	Stoll Field • Lexington, KY	**W** 17–0		
October 21	Maryville (TN)	**Tennessee**	Waite Field • Knoxville, TN	**W** 22–5		
October 21	**Auburn**	Texas A&M	Gaston Park • Dallas, TX	**L** 0–16		
October 21	Louisiana Normal	**Tulane**	Tulane Stadium • New Orleans, LA	**W** 45–0		

=== Week Six ===
Date	Visiting team	Home team	Site	Result	Attendance	Reference
October 24	**Ole Miss**	Henderson	Arkadelphia, AR	**W** 24–11		
October 25	Florida	**Clemson**	Bowman Field • Calhoun, SC	**L** 5–6		
October 27	**Ole Miss**	Texas A&M	Kyle Field • College Station, TX	**L** 0–17		
October 28	**The Citadel**	College of Charleston	College Park Stadium • Charleston, SC	**W** 21–0		
October 28	**Mississippi A&M**	**Auburn**	Rickwood Field • Birmingham, AL	**AUB** 11–5		
October 28	**Mercer**	**Georgia**	Sanford Field • Athens, GA	**UGA** 8–5		
October 28	**Tennessee**	North Carolina A&M	Riddick Stadium • Raleigh, NC	**L** 0–16		
October 28	Rose Polytechnic	**Central University**	High School Park • Louisville, KY	**W** 11-5		
October 28	Cincinnati	**Kentucky State**	Stoll Field • Lexington, KY	**L** 0–6		
October 28	Meteor Athletic Club	**LSU**	State Field • Baton Rouge, LA	**W** 40–0		
October 28	**Vanderbilt**	Michigan	Ferry Field • Ann Arbor, MI	**L** 9–8		
October 28	**Howard (AL)**	**Tulane**	Tulane Stadium • New Orleans, LA	**TUL** 10–0		

=== Week Seven ===
Date	Visiting team	Home team	Site	Result	Attendance	Reference
October 28	**Alabama**	**Georgia Tech**	Ponce de Leon Park • Atlanta, GA	**T** 0–0		
October 30	**Ole Miss**	**Mississippi College**	Fairgrounds • Jackson, MS	**MISS** 28–0		
November 2	**Sewanee**	Texas	Clark Field • Austin, TX	**W** 6–5		
November 2	**Clemson**	South Carolina	State Fairgrounds • Columbia, SC	**W** 27–0		
November 3	Birmingham	**Mississippi A&M**	Hardy Field • Starkville, MS	**W** 62–0		
November 4	**Alabama**	Marion	Marion, AL	**W** 35–0		
November 4	**Auburn**	**Georgia Tech**	Ponce de Leon Park • Atlanta, GA	**AUB** 11–6		
November 4	**Clemson**	**The Citadel**	College Park Stadium • Charleston, SC	**CLEM** 18–0		
November 4	**Central University**	**Tennessee**	Waite Field • Knoxville, TN	**T** 0–0		
November 4	**Kentucky State**	Georgetown (KY)	Hinton Field • Georgetown, KY	**W** 18–0		
November 4	**LSU**	Baylor	Waco, TX	**W** 6–0		
November 4	**Mississippi College**	Louisiana Industrial	Athletic Field • Ruston, LA	**L** 0–25		
November 4	**Ole Miss**	**Mercer**	Central City Park • Macon, GA	**MISS** 34–0		
November 4	**Sewanee**	**Tulane**	Tulane Stadium • New Orleans, LA	**SEW** 9–3		
November 4	**Georgia**	**Vanderbilt**	Dudley Field • Nashville, TN	**VAN** 17–0		

=== Week Eight ===
Date	Visiting team	Home team	Site	Result	Attendance	Reference
November 9	**Clemson**	**Georgia**	Augusta, GA	**UGA** 22–0		
November 10	Southern (AL)	**Howard (AL)**	Alabama State Fairgrounds • Birmingham, AL	**T** 0–0		
November 11	Porter Military Academy	**The Citadel**	College Park Stadium • Charleston, SC	**W** 6–0		
November 11	**Sewanee**	**Georgia Tech**	Ponce de Leon Park • Atlanta, GA	**GT** 23–0		
November 11	Columbia College (FL)	**Mercer**	Valdosta, GA	**T** 6–6		
November 11	**Kentucky State**	**Vanderbilt**	Dudley Field • Nashville, TN	**VAN** 18–0		
November 11	**Tennessee**	VPI	Miles Field • Blacksburg, VA	**L** 11–36		
November 11	**Tulane**	**Alabama**	The Quad • Tuscaloosa, AL	**ALA** 22–0		

=== Week Nine ===
Date	Visiting team	Home team	Site	Result	Attendance	Reference
November 12	**LSU**	**Mississippi A&M**	Fairgrounds • Gulfport, MS	**MSA&M** 6–0		
November 17	**Howard (AL)**	Birmingham	Rickwood Field • Birmingham, AL	**W** 6–5		
November 17	**Auburn**	Texas	Clark Field • Austin, TX	**L** 5–18		
November 18	Georgetown (KY)	**Central University**	Cheek Field • Danville, KY	**W** 27–0		
November 18	College of Charleston	**The Citadel**	College Park Stadium • Charleston, SC	**W** 21–3		
November 18	**Georgia**	**Georgia Tech**	Ponce de Leon Park • Atlanta, GA	**UGA** 5–0		
November 18	**Clemson**	**Mercer**	Driving Park • Columbus, GA	**MER** 30–6		
November 18	Transylvania	**Kentucky State**	Lexington, KY	**L** 5–12		
November 18	**LSU**	Southwestern (TX)	West End Park • Houston, TX	**L** 6–17		
November 18	Southwestern Presbyterian	**Tennessee**	Waite Field • Knoxville, TN	**W** 22–0		
November 18	**Ole Miss**	**Vanderbilt**	Dudley Field • Nashville, TN	**VAN** 21–0		
November 18	**Sewanee**	**Alabama**	Alabama State Fairgrounds • Birmingham, AL	**SEW** 3–0		

=== Week Ten ===
Date	Visiting team	Home team	Site	Result	Attendance	Reference
November 20	**Tulane**	**Mississippi A&M**	Hardy Field • Starkville, MS	**TUL** 5–4		
November 23	**Central University**	**Kentucky State**	Stoll Field • Lexington, KY	**KEN** 8–5		
November 25	**Tennessee**	Tennessee Docs	Red Elm Park • Memphis, TN	**T** 0–0		

=== Week Eleven ===
Date	Visiting team	Home team	Site	Result	Attendance	Reference
November 29	**Auburn**	**Georgia**	Savannah, GA	**T** 0–0		
November 30	Davidson	**Alabama**	Alabama State Fairgrounds • Birmingham, AL	**W** 16–6		
November 30	**Clemson**	**Georgia Tech**	Ponce de Leon Park • Atlanta, GA	**GT** 32–0		
November 30	**Tennessee**	**Kentucky State**	Stoll Field • Lexington, KY	**KEN** 12–0		
November 30	**Howard (AL)**	**Mercer**	Central City Park • Macon, GA	**MER** 29–0		
November 30	**Ole Miss**	**Mississippi A&M**	State Fairgrounds • Jackson, MS	**MSA&M** 6–0		
November 30	**Central University**	Transylvania	Thomas Field • Lexington, KY	**W** 13–7		
November 30	South Carolina	**The Citadel**	College Park Stadium • Charleston, SC	**T** 0–0		
November 30	**Sewanee**	**Vanderbilt**	Dudley Field • Nashville, TN	**VAN** 31–0	6,000	
November 30	Washington and Lee	**Tulane**	Tulane Stadium • New Orleans, LA	**T** 5–5		

=== Week Twelve ===
Date	Visiting team	Home team	Site	Result	Attendance	Reference
December 9	Parris Island Marines	**The Citadel**	College Park Stadium • Charleston, SC	**W** 17–10		
December 9	**Tulane**	**LSU**	State Field • Baton Rouge, LA	**LSU** 6–0		

== Bowl games ==
Date	Bowl Game	Site	SIAA Team	Opponent	Score	Reference
January 1, 1912	Bacardi Bowl	Almandares Park • Havana, Cuba	Mississippi A&M	Cuban Athletic Club	MSA&M 12–0	

== Awards and honors ==
=== All-Americans ===
- QB - Ray Morrison, Vanderbilt (HL; COY [hb])

=== All-Southern team ===
John Heisman's All-Southern team:

Position	Player	Team
QB	Ray Morrison	Vanderbilt
HB	Lew Hardage	Vanderbilt
HB	Bob McWhorter	Georgia
FB	John E. Davis	Auburn
E	Roy Goree	Georgia Tech
T	Ewing Y. Freeland	Vanderbilt
G	Will Metzger	Vanderbilt
C	Hugh Morgan	Vanderbilt
G	David Peacock	Georgia
T	Sheep Lamb	Auburn
E	By Walton	Mississippi
