= Prentiss Douglass =

American football player and coach (1887–1949)

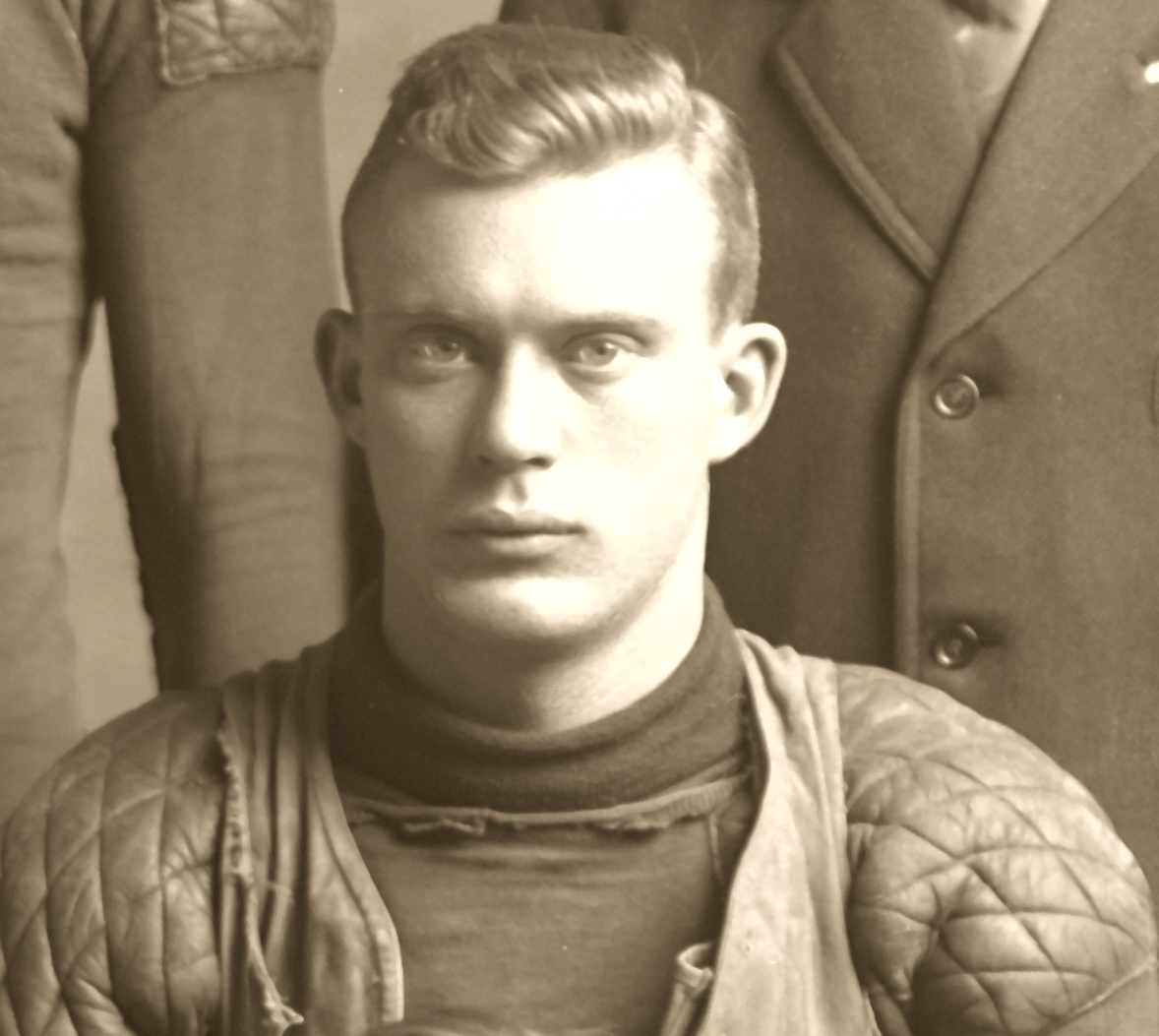
- Douglass cropped from 1908 Michigan football team photograph

Biographical details
- Born: June 23, 1887; Martinsville, Illinois, U.S.
- Died: November 9, 1949 (aged 62); Lexington, Kentucky, U.S.

Playing career
- 1907–1908: Michigan
- Position: Halfback

Coaching career (HC unless noted)
- 1909–1910: Michigan (assistant)
- 1911: Kentucky State College
- 1912–1919: Michigan (assistant)

Head coaching record
- Overall: 7–3

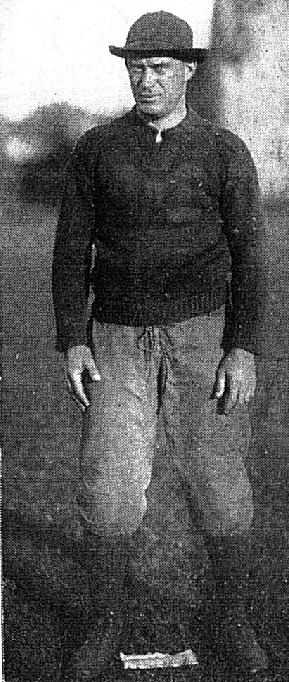
Assistant coach in 1916

Prentiss Porter Douglass (June 23, 1887 – November 9, 1949) was an American college football player and coach.

A native of Martinsville, Illinois, Douglass graduated from the Culver Military Academy and the University of Michigan. He played football for Fielding H. Yost's 1907 and 1908 Michigan Wolverines football teams at the halfback position. After graduating from Michigan in 1909, he served as an assistant football coach at Michigan during the 1909 and 1910 football seasons. In 1911, he was the head football coach at Kentucky State College—now known as the University of Kentucky. His 1911 Kentucky State College Wildcats football team finished the season a record of 7–3 . Kentucky was unscored upon in its first four games, surrendering six points to the Cincinnati in the fifth game. The season's highlights included the final two games, victories over Central University and Tennessee. After one year at Kentucky, Douglass returned to the University of Michigan, where he served as an assistant football coach from 1912 to 1919. He retired from football after the 1919 season to go into business. Douglass died of a heart ailment in Lexington, Kentucky in 1949 at age 62.

== Head coaching record ==
| Year | Team | Overall | Conference | Standing | Bowl/playoffs |
|---|---|---|---|---|---|
Kentucky State College Wildcats (Independent) (1911)
| 1911 | Kentucky State College | 7–3 | | | |
| Kentucky State College: | | 7–3 | | | |
| Total: | | 7–3 | | | |
