= 1911 Alabama Crimson Tide football team =

American college football season

1911 Alabama Crimson Tide football
- Conference: Southern Intercollegiate Athletic Association
- Record: 5–2–2 (2–2–2 SIAA)
- Head coach: D. V. Graves (1st season)
- Captain: Robert Bumgardner
- Home stadium: The Quad; Birmingham Fairgrounds

1911 Southern Intercollegiate Athletic Association football standings
	Conf.					Overall
Team	W		L		T	W		L		T
Vanderbilt $	5	–	0	–	0	8	–	1	–	0
Auburn	4	–	0	–	1	4	–	2	–	1
Georgia	5	–	1	–	1	7	–	1	–	1
Georgia Tech	5	–	2	–	1	6	–	2	–	1
Kentucky State	2	–	1	–	0	7	–	3	–	0
LSU	2	–	1	–	0	6	–	3	–	0
Mississippi A&M	4	–	2	–	1	7	–	2	–	1
Alabama	2	–	2	–	2	5	–	2	–	2
Ole Miss	2	–	2	–	0	6	–	3	–	0
Tulane	3	–	3	–	0	5	–	3	–	1
Sewanee	2	–	3	–	0	6	–	3	–	1
Clemson	2	–	4	–	0	3	–	5	–	0
The Citadel	1	–	1	–	0	5	–	2	–	2
Mercer	2	–	5	–	0	4	–	6	–	1
Central University	0	–	2	–	1	3	–	2	–	1
Tennessee	0	–	2	–	1	3	–	4	–	2
Mississippi College	0	–	4	–	0	1	–	5	–	0
Howard (AL)	0	–	6	–	0	1	–	6	–	1
$ – Conference champion

The 1911 Alabama Crimson Tide football team (variously "Alabama", "UA" or "Bama") represented the University of Alabama in the 1911 college football season. It was the Crimson Tide's 19th overall and 16th season as a member of the Southern Intercollegiate Athletic Association (SIAA). The team was led by head coach D. V. Graves, in his first year, and played their home games at the University of Alabama Quad in Tuscaloosa and the Birmingham Fairgrounds in Birmingham, Alabama. They finished the season with a record of five wins, two losses and two ties (5–2–2 overall, 2–2–2 in the SIAA).

In June 1911, Guy Lowman resigned from his position of head coach and athletic director at Alabama, and one month later the hiring of Graves to serve in both capacities was announced by the university president. Under Graves, Alabama opened their season with a pair of victories over Howard and Birmingham College at Tuscaloosa. They were then upset by Georgia at Birmingham before playing both Mississippi A&M and Georgia Tech to ties on the road. After a victory over Marion Military Institute in their final road game of the season, Alabama closed the season with victories over both Tulane and Davidson and an upset loss to Sewanee.

== Schedule ==
Date	Opponent	Site	Result	Source
September 30	Howard (AL)	The Quad; Tuscaloosa, AL	W 24–0	
October 7	Birmingham*	The Quad; Tuscaloosa, AL	W 47–5	
October 14	Georgia	Birmingham Fairgrounds; Birmingham, AL (rivalry)	L 3–11	
October 20	at Mississippi A&M	Columbus Fairgrounds; Columbus, MS (rivalry)	T 6–6	
October 28	at Georgia Tech	Ponce de Leon Park; Atlanta, GA (rivalry)	T 0–0	
November 4	at Marion*	Marion, AL	W 35–0	
November 11	Tulane	The Quad; Tuscaloosa, AL	W 22–0	
November 18	Sewanee	Birmingham Fairgrounds; Birmingham, AL	L 0–3	
November 30	Davidson*	Birmingham Fairgrounds; Birmingham, AL	W 16–6	
*Non-conference game

(Note: For the 1911 season, point values were different from those used in contemporary games. In 1911 a touchdown was worth five points, a field goal was worth three points and an extra point (PAT) was worth one point.)

== Before the season ==
On June 21, 1911, Kansas State Agricultural College (now known as Kansas State University) announced Alabama head coach and athletic director Guy Lowman had been hired to serve in the same capacities at Kansas State. After a month-long search, on July 21, university president John Abercrombie offered the job of professor of physical training and athletic director to D. V. Graves to which he accepted immediately via telegraph. The appointment was inclusive of him serving as head coach of all athletic teams at Alabama, including football. Graves was selected as he was the most highly recommended candidate, and he also played baseball for a single-season under Lowman while in college at the University of Missouri.

== Game summaries ==
=== Howard (AL) ===
Week 1: Howard at Alabama

Team	1	2	3	4	Total
Howard	0	0	0	0	0
• Alabama	0	6	0	18	24

- Date: September 30
- Location: The Quad
  Tuscaloosa, AL
- Referee: Donnelley

Alabama opened the season with a 24–0 shutout victory over Howard (now Samford) at Tuscaloosa. After a scoreless first quarter, the Crimson Tide took a 6–0 lead into halftime after Farley Moody scored on a 40-yard punt return for a touchdown. After a scoreless third, Alabama then closed the game with a trio of fourth quarter touchdowns. Robert Bumgardner scored first on a five-yard run, Moody on a one-yard run and Charlie Joplin on a 65-yard reception.

The starting lineup was Hargrove Vandegraaff (left end), Harold Mustin Powell (left tackle), Phillip Brooks Keller (left guard), Henry Barnett (center), Julius Clorefeline (right guard), C. C. Countess (right tackle), W. S. Pritchard (right end), Farley Moody (quarterback), Robert Bumgardner (left halfback), Edward Judson Finnell (right halfback), Adrian Vandegraaff (fullback).

=== Birmingham ===
Week 2: Birmingham at Alabama

Team	1	2	3	4	Total
Birmingham	5	0	0	0	5
• Alabama	6	11	6	24	47

- Date: October 7
- Location: The Quad
  Tuscaloosa, AL
- Referee: Corleaux (Washington)

In their second game of the season, Alabama defeated Birmingham College (now Birmingham–Southern College) 47–5 at The Quad. Adrian Vandegraaff gave Alabama an early 6–0 lead behind his short touchdown run within the first three minutes of the game. Birmingham responded with their only points of the day on the drive that ensued on a short Taylor run and made the score 6–5. In the second, Alabama extended their lead to 17–5 behind a short touchdown run by Vandegraaff and a 30-yard run by Robert Bumgardner.

After Farley Moody scored on a short touchdown run early in the third, Alabama closed the game with four touchdowns in the fourth quarter. Hargrove Van de Graaff scored first after he blocked a Birmingham punt and returned it 22-yards for the score. Adrian Van de Graaff next scored on an 85-yard kickoff return followed by a fourth Adrian Vandegraaff touchdown run and a 70-yard C. W. Greer run that made the final score 47–5.

The starting lineup was Robert Bumgardner (left end), Harold Mustin Powell (left tackle), Phillip Brooks Keller (left guard), Henry Barnett (center), Julius Clorefeline (right guard), C. C. Countess (right tackle), W. S. Pritchard (right end), Farley Moody (quarterback), Hargrove Vandegraaff (left halfback), Edward Judson Finnell (right halfback), Adrian Vandegraaff (fullback).

=== Georgia ===
Week 3: Georgia at Alabama

Team	1	2	3	4	Total
• Georgia	5	0	0	6	11
Alabama	0	3	0	0	3

- Date: October 14
- Location: Fairgrounds
  Birmingham, AL
- Referee: Ed Hamilton

In what was their first Birmingham game of the season, the Crimsons lost to Georgia 11–3 at the Fairgrounds. Bob McWhorter scored the first Georgia points of the game after he recovered a punt fumbled by Farley Moody and returned it for a touchdown and 5–0 lead. Farley then cut the Bulldog lead to 5–3 at halftime behind his 35-yard drop kick field goal in the second quarter. McWhorter then made the final score 11–3 behind his 12-yard touchdown run late in the fourth quarter.

The starting lineup was: Hargrove Vandergraaf (left end), Harold Mustin Powell (left tackle), Phillip Brooks Keller (left guard), Henry Barnett (center), Julius Clorefeline (right guard), C. C. Countess (right tackle), William L. Harsh (right end), Farley Moody (quarterback), Courtney (left halfback), Holt Andrews McDowell (right halfback), Adrian Vandegraaff (fullback).

=== Mississippi A&M ===
Week 4: Alabama at Mississippi A&M

Team	1	2	3	4	Total
Alabama	0	0	6	0	6
MS A&M	0	6	0	0	6

- Date: October 20
- Location: Fairgrounds
  Columbus, MS
- Referee: George Watkins

In their first road game of the season, the Alabama played the Mississippi A&M Aggies to a 6–6 tie before 3,000 fans at the Fairgrounds in Columbus, Mississippi. After a scoreless first, the Aggies took a 6–0 lead behind a four-yard Morley Jennings touchdown run. Alabama responded with their lone points after Adrian Vandegraaff returned a Mississippi fumble 25-yard and tied the game 6–6.

The starting lineup was: Hargrove Vandergraaf (left end), Harold Mustin Powell (left tackle), Phillip Brooks Keller (left guard), Henry Barnett (center), Julius Clorefeline (right guard), J. W. Hicks (right tackle), Robert Bumgardner (right end), Farley Moody (quarterback), Holt Andrews McDowell (left halfback), Edward Judson Finnell (right halfback), Adrian Vandegraaff (fullback).

=== Georgia Tech ===
Week 5: Alabama at Georgia Tech

Team	1	2	3	4	Total
Alabama	0	0	0	0	0
Ga. Tech	0	0	0	0	0

- Date: October 28
- Location: Ponce de Leon Park
  Atlanta, GA
- Referee: Brown (Vanderbilt)

The Georgia Tech game ended in a scoreless tie after time expired as Alabama drove to the Tech three-yard line. Following a hard-fought scoreless tie with Georgia Tech in 1911, coach John Heisman declared that he had never seen a player "so thoroughly imbued with the true spirit of football as Hargrove Vandegraaff."

The starting lineup was: Hargrove Vandergraaf (left end), Harold Mustin Powell (left tackle), Phillip Brooks Keller (left guard), Henry Barnett (center), Julius Clorefeline (right guard), C. C. Countess (right tackle), Robert Bumgardner (right end), Farley Moody (quarterback), Holt Andrews McDowell (left halfback), Edward Judson Finnell (right halfback), Adrian Vandegraaff (fullback).

=== Marion ===
In what was their third consecutive road game, Alabama shutout the Marion Military Institute 35–0.

=== Tulane ===
Week 7: Tulane at Alabama

Team	1	2	3	4	Total
Tulane	0	0	0	0	0
• Alabama	0	5	0	17	22

- Date: November 11
- Location: The Quad
  Tuscaloosa, AL
- Referee: George Watkins

In what was their final Tuscaloosa game of the season, Alabama shutout Tulane 22–0 at The Quad. After a scoreless first, Alabama took a 5–0 lead in the second quarter on a 40-yard Farley Moody punt return. The score remained the same through the fourth quarter when Alabama scored a trio of touchdowns for the 22–0 victory. Touchdowns were scored on short runs by both Adrian and Hargrove Vandergraaf as well as on a 25-yard Robert Bumgardner run.

The starting lineup was: Hargrove Vandergraaf (left end), Harold Mustin Powell (left tackle), Phillip Brooks Keller (left guard), Henry Barnett (center), Julius Clorefeline (right guard), C. C. Countess (right tackle), Robert Bumgardner (right end), Farley Moody (quarterback), Holt Andrews McDowell (left halfback), William L. Harsh (right halfback), Adrian Vandegraaff (fullback).

=== Sewanee ===
Week 8: Sewanee at Alabama

Team	1	2	3	4	Total
• Sewanee	0	0	0	3	3
Alabama	0	0	0	0	0

- Date: November 18
- Location: Fairgrounds
  Birmingham, AL
- Referee: Elgin (Nashville)

In extremely muddy conditions at Birmingham, Alabama was upset by Sewanee 3–0 at the Fairgrounds. The game remained scoreless through the final minutes of the game when Jenks Gillem connected on a 15-yard drop kick field goal that gave the Tigers the 3–0 victory.

The starting lineup was: Hargrove Vandergraaf (left end), Harold Mustin Powell (left tackle), Phillip Brooks Keller (left guard), Henry Barnett (center), Julius Clorefeline (right guard), C. C. Countess (right tackle), Robert Bumgardner (right end), Farley Moody (quarterback), Holt Andrews McDowell (left halfback), William L. Harsh (right halfback), Adrian Vandegraaff (fullback).

=== Davidson ===
Week 9: Davidson at Alabama

Team	1	2	3	4	Total
Davidson	0	6	0	0	6
• Alabama	0	5	0	11	16

- Date: November 30
- Location: Fairgrounds
  Birmingham, AL
- Referee: George Watkins

In their only all-time meeting against Davidson, Alabama Alabama rallied with a pair of late touchdowns and defeated the Wildcats 16–6 at the Birmingham Fairgrounds in their season finale. After a scoreless first quarter, Alabama took a 5–0 lead behind a long Adrian Vandegraaff touchdown reception from Farley Moody on a fake punt. Davidson responded on the drive that ensued and took a 6–5 lead behind a 55-yard Q. D. Williford interception return for a touchdown.

The Wildcats retained the lead through the fourth quarter when Alabama won the game behind a pair of late touchdowns. Adrian Vandegraaff scored first on a 27-yard touchdown run and was followed with a second touchdown run from Vandegraaff that made the final score 16–6.

The starting lineup was: Hargrove Vandergraaf (left end), Harold Mustin Powell (left tackle), Phillip Brooks Keller (left guard), Henry Barnett (center), J. W. Hicks (right guard), C. C. Countess (right tackle), Robert Bumgardner (right end), Farley Moody (quarterback), Holt Andrews McDowell (left halfback), William L. Harsh (right halfback), Adrian Vandegraaff (fullback).

== Roster ==
Alabama Crimson Tide 1911 roster
Backs: Edward Judson Finnell; Charles West Greer; William L. Harsh; Victor John Heard; Holt Andrews McDowell; Farley Moody; Adrian Van de Graaff	Ends: Robert Bumgardner; Hargrove Van de Graaff; Charlie Joplin; M. Cammack; Tackles: James Gibbons; Harold Mustin Powell; W. S. Pritchard	Guards: Julius Clorefeline; J. W. Hicks; Phillip Brooks Keller; P. W. Shumate; Center: Henry Barnett; C. C. Countess	Coaching staff: D. V. Graves – Head coach; Auxford Burks – Assistant coach; George Barnett – Manager
