= 1911 Georgia Tech Yellow Jackets football team =

American college football season

1911 Georgia Tech Yellow Jackets football
- Conference: Southern Intercollegiate Athletic Association
- Record: 6–2–1 (5–2–1 SIAA)
- Head coach: John Heisman (8th season)
- Offensive scheme: Jump shift
- Captain: Pat Patterson
- Home stadium: Ponce de Leon Park

1911 Southern Intercollegiate Athletic Association football standings
	Conf.					Overall
Team	W		L		T	W		L		T
Vanderbilt $	5	–	0	–	0	8	–	1	–	0
Auburn	4	–	0	–	1	4	–	2	–	1
Georgia	5	–	1	–	1	7	–	1	–	1
Georgia Tech	5	–	2	–	1	6	–	2	–	1
Kentucky State	2	–	1	–	0	7	–	3	–	0
LSU	2	–	1	–	0	6	–	3	–	0
Mississippi A&M	4	–	2	–	1	7	–	2	–	1
Alabama	2	–	2	–	2	5	–	2	–	2
Ole Miss	2	–	2	–	0	6	–	3	–	0
Tulane	3	–	3	–	0	5	–	3	–	1
Sewanee	2	–	3	–	0	6	–	3	–	1
Clemson	2	–	4	–	0	3	–	5	–	0
The Citadel	1	–	1	–	0	5	–	2	–	2
Mercer	2	–	5	–	0	4	–	6	–	1
Central University	0	–	2	–	1	3	–	2	–	1
Tennessee	0	–	2	–	1	3	–	4	–	2
Mississippi College	0	–	4	–	0	1	–	5	–	0
Howard (AL)	0	–	6	–	0	1	–	6	–	1
$ – Conference champion

The 1911 Georgia Tech Yellow Jackets football team represented the Georgia School of Technology (now known as Georgia Institute of Technology or just Georgia Tech) as a member of the Southern Intercollegiate Athletic Association (SIAA) during the 1911 college football season. Led by John Heisman in his eighth season as head coach, the Yellow Jackets compiled an overall record of 6–2–1 with a mark of 5–2–1 in conference play.

The team featured future coach William Alexander as a reserve quarterback.

== Schedule ==
Date	Opponent	Site	Result	Source
September 30	11th Cavalry*	Piedmont Park; Atlanta, GA	W 57–0	
October 7	at Howard (AL)	Alabama State Fairgrounds; Birmingham, AL	W 28–0	
October 14	Tennessee	Ponce de Leon Park; Atlanta, GA (rivalry)	W 24–0	
October 21	Mercer	Ponce de Leon Park; Atlanta, GA	W 17–0	
October 28	Alabama	Ponce de Leon Park; Atlanta, GA (rivalry)	T 0–0	
November 4	Auburn	Ponce de Leon Park; Atlanta, GA (rivalry)	L 6–11	
November 11	Sewanee	Ponce de Leon Park; Atlanta, GA	W 23–0	
November 18	Georgia	Ponce de Leon Park; Atlanta, GA (rivalry)	L 0–5	
November 30	Clemson	Ponce de Leon Park; Atlanta, GA (rivalry)	W 32–0	
*Non-conference game
