= 1911 Clemson Tigers football team =

American college football season

1911 Clemson Tigers football
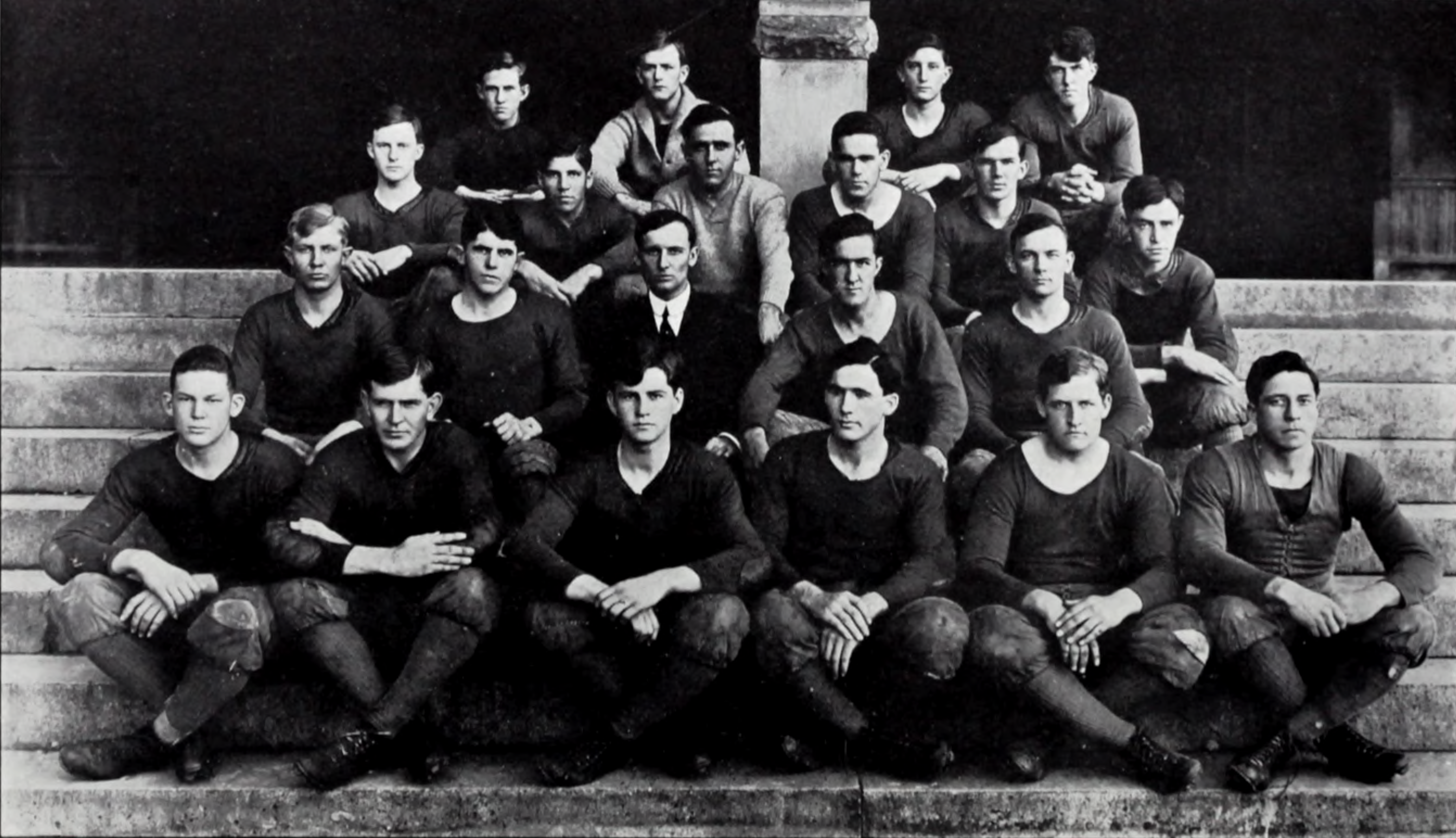
- Conference: Southern Intercollegiate Athletic Association
- Record: 3–5 (2–4 SIAA)
- Head coach: Frank Dobson (2nd season)
- Captain: Paul Bissell
- Home stadium: Bowman Field

1911 Southern Intercollegiate Athletic Association football standings
	Conf.					Overall
Team	W		L		T	W		L		T
Vanderbilt $	5	–	0	–	0	8	–	1	–	0
Auburn	4	–	0	–	1	4	–	2	–	1
Georgia	5	–	1	–	1	7	–	1	–	1
Georgia Tech	5	–	2	–	1	6	–	2	–	1
Kentucky State	2	–	1	–	0	7	–	3	–	0
LSU	2	–	1	–	0	6	–	3	–	0
Mississippi A&M	4	–	2	–	1	7	–	2	–	1
Alabama	2	–	2	–	2	5	–	2	–	2
Ole Miss	2	–	2	–	0	6	–	3	–	0
Tulane	3	–	3	–	0	5	–	3	–	1
Sewanee	2	–	3	–	0	6	–	3	–	1
Clemson	2	–	4	–	0	3	–	5	–	0
The Citadel	1	–	1	–	0	5	–	2	–	2
Mercer	2	–	5	–	0	4	–	6	–	1
Central University	0	–	2	–	1	3	–	2	–	1
Tennessee	0	–	2	–	1	3	–	4	–	2
Mississippi College	0	–	4	–	0	1	–	5	–	0
Howard (AL)	0	–	6	–	0	1	–	6	–	1
$ – Conference champion

The 1911 Clemson Tigers football team represented Clemson Agricultural College—now known as Clemson University—as a member of the Southern Intercollegiate Athletic Association (SIAA) during the 1911 college football season. Under second-year head coach Frank Dobson, the team compiled an overall record of 3–5 with a mark of 2–4 in SIAA play. Paul Bissell was the team captain.

== Schedule ==
Date	Opponent	Site	Result	Attendance	Source
October 14	Auburn	Bowman Field; Calhoun, SC (rivalry)	L 0–29		
October 21	Howard (AL)	Bowman Field; Calhoun, SC	W 14–0		
October 25	Florida*	Bowman Field; Calhoun, SC	L 5–6		
November 2	at South Carolina*	State Fairgrounds; Columbia, SC (rivalry)	W 27–0	3,500	
November 4	at The Citadel	College Park Stadium; Charleston, SC	W 18–0		
November 9	vs. Georgia	Augusta, GA (rivalry)	L 0–23		
November 18	vs. Mercer	Driving Park; Columbus, GA	L 6–30		
November 30	at Georgia Tech	Ponce de Leon Park; Atlanta, GA (rivalry)	L 0–31		
*Non-conference game
