= 1911 Georgia Bulldogs football team =

American college football season

1911 Georgia Bulldogs football
- Conference: Southern Intercollegiate Athletic Association
- Record: 7–1–1 (5–1–1 SIAA)
- Head coach: W. A. Cunningham (2nd season)
- Captain: George Cecil Woodruff
- Home stadium: Sanford Field

1911 Southern Intercollegiate Athletic Association football standings
	Conf.					Overall
Team	W		L		T	W		L		T
Vanderbilt $	5	–	0	–	0	8	–	1	–	0
Auburn	4	–	0	–	1	4	–	2	–	1
Georgia	5	–	1	–	1	7	–	1	–	1
Georgia Tech	5	–	2	–	1	6	–	2	–	1
Kentucky State	2	–	1	–	0	7	–	3	–	0
LSU	2	–	1	–	0	6	–	3	–	0
Mississippi A&M	4	–	2	–	1	7	–	2	–	1
Alabama	2	–	2	–	2	5	–	2	–	2
Ole Miss	2	–	2	–	0	6	–	3	–	0
Tulane	3	–	3	–	0	5	–	3	–	1
Sewanee	2	–	3	–	0	6	–	3	–	1
Clemson	2	–	4	–	0	3	–	5	–	0
The Citadel	1	–	1	–	0	5	–	2	–	2
Mercer	2	–	5	–	0	4	–	6	–	1
Central University	0	–	2	–	1	3	–	2	–	1
Tennessee	0	–	2	–	1	3	–	4	–	2
Mississippi College	0	–	4	–	0	1	–	5	–	0
Howard (AL)	0	–	6	–	0	1	–	6	–	1
$ – Conference champion

The 1911 Georgia Bulldogs football team represented the University of Georgia during the 1911 college football season. The Bulldogs completed the season with a 7–1–1 record. The only blemishes on the season were a loss to Vanderbilt and a tie with Auburn. Vanderbilt went on to win its second straight SIAA conference title. The season provided second consecutive victories over Alabama and Georgia Tech and the first victory in a number of years against Sewanee. The captain of the 1911 team and one of the star players was quarterback George Cecil Woodruff. Woodruff became the third Georgia player to later become head coach of the Bulldogs when he assumed that role in 1923.

The 1911 season was Georgia's 20th football season. After 20 years of football, the Bulldogs had played 127 games and had a 60–55–12 record (.520 winning percentage).

== Schedule ==
Date	Opponent	Site	Result	Source
September 30	Alabama Presbyterian*	Sanford Field; Athens, GA	W 51–0	
October 7	South Carolina*	Sanford Field; Athens, GA (rivalry)	W 38–0	
October 14	at Alabama	Birmingham Fairgrounds; Birmingham, AL (rivalry)	W 11–3	
October 21	Sewanee	Sanford Field; Athens, GA	W 12–3	
October 28	Mercer	Sanford Field; Athens, GA	W 8–5	
November 4	at Vanderbilt	Dudley Field; Nashville, TN (rivalry)	L 0–17	
November 9	Clemson	Augusta, GA (rivalry)	W 22–0	
November 18	at Georgia Tech	Ponce de Leon Park; Atlanta, GA (rivalry)	W 5–0	
November 29	vs. Auburn	Savannah, GA (rivalry)	T 0–0	
*Non-conference game
