= 1911 Sewanee Tigers football team =

American college football season

1911 Sewanee Tigers football
- Conference: Southern Intercollegiate Athletic Association
- Record: 6–3–1 (2–3 SIAA)
- Head coach: Harris G. Cope (3rd season)
- Captain: John Myers
- Home stadium: Hardee Field

1911 Southern Intercollegiate Athletic Association football standings
	Conf.					Overall
Team	W		L		T	W		L		T
Vanderbilt $	5	–	0	–	0	8	–	1	–	0
Auburn	4	–	0	–	1	4	–	2	–	1
Georgia	5	–	1	–	1	7	–	1	–	1
Georgia Tech	5	–	2	–	1	6	–	2	–	1
Kentucky State	2	–	1	–	0	7	–	3	–	0
LSU	2	–	1	–	0	6	–	3	–	0
Mississippi A&M	4	–	2	–	1	7	–	2	–	1
Alabama	2	–	2	–	2	5	–	2	–	2
Ole Miss	2	–	2	–	0	6	–	3	–	0
Tulane	3	–	3	–	0	5	–	3	–	1
Sewanee	2	–	3	–	0	6	–	3	–	1
Clemson	2	–	4	–	0	3	–	5	–	0
The Citadel	1	–	1	–	0	5	–	2	–	2
Mercer	2	–	5	–	0	4	–	6	–	1
Central University	0	–	2	–	1	3	–	2	–	1
Tennessee	0	–	2	–	1	3	–	4	–	2
Mississippi College	0	–	4	–	0	1	–	5	–	0
Howard (AL)	0	–	6	–	0	1	–	6	–	1
$ – Conference champion

The 1911 Sewanee Tigers football team represented Sewanee: The University of the South during the 1911 college football season as a member of the Southern Intercollegiate Athletic Association (SIAA). The Tigers were led by head coach Harris G. Cope in his third season and finished with a record of six wins, three losses, and one tie (6–3–1 overall, 2–3 in the SIAA).

== Schedule ==
Date	Opponent	Site	Result	Attendance	Source
September 30	Sewanee Military Academy*	Hardee Field; Sewanee, TN	W 16–0		
October 7	Murfreesboro School for Boys*	Hardee Field; Sewanee, TN	W 20–0		
October 11	Morgan Training School*	Hardee Field; Sewanee, TN	T 0–0		
October 14	Castle Heights*	Hardee Field; Sewanee, TN	W 25–0		
October 21	at Georgia	Sanford Field; Athens, GA	L 3–12		
November 2	at Texas*	Clark Field; Austin, TX	W 6–5		
November 4	at Tulane	Tulane Stadium; New Orleans, LA	W 9–3		
November 11	at Georgia Tech	Ponce de Leon Park; Atlanta, GA	L 0–23		
November 18	at Alabama	Birmingham Fairgrounds; Birmingham, AL	W 3–0		
November 30	at Vanderbilt	Dudley Field; Nashville, TN (rivalry)	L 0–31	6,000	
*Non-conference game
