= 1911 Vanderbilt Commodores football team =

American college football season

1911 Vanderbilt Commodores football

National champion (Billingsley) SIAA champion
- Conference: Southern Intercollegiate Athletic Association
- Record: 8–1 (5–0 SIAA)
- Head coach: Dan McGugin (8th season)
- Offensive scheme: Short punt
- Captain: Ray Morrison
- Home stadium: Dudley Field

1911 Southern Intercollegiate Athletic Association football standings
	Conf.					Overall
Team	W		L		T	W		L		T
Vanderbilt $	5	–	0	–	0	8	–	1	–	0
Auburn	4	–	0	–	1	4	–	2	–	1
Georgia	5	–	1	–	1	7	–	1	–	1
Georgia Tech	5	–	2	–	1	6	–	2	–	1
Kentucky State	2	–	1	–	0	7	–	3	–	0
LSU	2	–	1	–	0	6	–	3	–	0
Mississippi A&M	4	–	2	–	1	7	–	2	–	1
Alabama	2	–	2	–	2	5	–	2	–	2
Ole Miss	2	–	2	–	0	6	–	3	–	0
Tulane	3	–	3	–	0	5	–	3	–	1
Sewanee	2	–	3	–	0	6	–	3	–	1
Clemson	2	–	4	–	0	3	–	5	–	0
The Citadel	1	–	1	–	0	5	–	2	–	2
Mercer	2	–	5	–	0	4	–	6	–	1
Central University	0	–	2	–	1	3	–	2	–	1
Tennessee	0	–	2	–	1	3	–	4	–	2
Mississippi College	0	–	4	–	0	1	–	5	–	0
Howard (AL)	0	–	6	–	0	1	–	6	–	1
$ – Conference champion

The 1911 Vanderbilt Commodores football team represented Vanderbilt University in the 1911 college football season. It was Dan McGugin's 8th year as head coach. The team outscored its opponents 259 to 9, winning an undisputed Southern Intercollegiate Athletic Association (SIAA) title.

Edwin Pope's Football's Greatest Coaches notes: "A lightning-swift backfield of Lew Hardage, Wilson Collins, Ammie Sikes, and Ray Morrison pushed Vandy through 1911 with only a 9–8 loss to Michigan." The Atlanta Constitution voted Vanderbilt's the best backfield in the South. Morrison is considered one of the best quarterbacks in Vanderbilt's long history

== Schedule ==
Date	Opponent	Site	Result	Attendance	Source
September 30	Birmingham*	Dudley Field; Nashville, TN	W 40–0		
October 7	Maryville (TN)*	Dudley Field; Nashville, TN	W 46–0		
October 14	Rose Polytechnic*	Dudley Field; Nashville, TN	W 33–0		
October 21	Central University	Dudley Field; Nashville, TN	W 45–0		
October 28	at Michigan*	Ferry Field; Ann Arbor, MI	L 8–9		
November 4	Georgia	Dudley Field; Nashville, TN (rivalry)	W 17–0		
November 11	Kentucky State College	Dudley Field; Nashville, TN (rivalry)	W 18–0		
November 18	Ole Miss	Dudley Field; Nashville, TN (rivalry)	W 21–0		
November 30	Sewanee	Dudley Field; Nashville, TN (rivalry)	W 31–0	6,000	
*Non-conference game

== Before the season ==
Vanderbilt prepared to face its most difficult schedule to date. The halfbacks and fullbacks were new, as Bill Neely and Bo Williams had graduated, and Kent Morrison was shifted to end. Lew Hardage transferred from Auburn and joined the team.

== Game summaries ==
=== Week 1: Birmingham ===
The season opened with a 40–0 win over Birmingham on a slippery field. Ammie Sikes and Lew Hardage proved to be the stars of the game.

The starting lineup was Morrison: (left end), Freeland (left tackle), Metzger (left guard), Morgan (center), C. Brown (right guard), T. Brown (right tackle), E. Brown (right end). R. Morrison (quarterback), Hardage (left halfback), Collins (right halfback), and Doherty (fullback).

=== Week 2: Maryvillle (TN) ===
The next week, Vanderbilt defeated Maryville 46-0. Ewing Y. Freeland and Zeke Martin played well in the line, but above all the game's star was Tom Brown.

The starting lineup was: Morrison (left end), Freeland (left tackle), Metzger (left guard), Morgan (center), C. Brown (right guard), T. Brown (right tackle), E. Brown (right end). R. Morrison (quarterback), Hardage (left halfback), Collins (right halfback), and Doherty (fullback).

=== Week 3: Rose Poly ===
Vanderbilt won 33–0 over Rose Polytechnic, in a game harder than prior weeks. The Tennessean's Spick Hall remarked on Rose's defense, "They all played a vicious game and when they tackled they did it in the good old-fashion way—right from the shoulder."

The starting lineup was: Metzger (left end), Freeland (left tackle), Covington (left guard), Morgan (center), C. Brown (right guard), T. Brown (right tackle), E. Brown (right end). R. Morrison (quarterback), Hardage (left halfback), Collins (right halfback), and Sikes (fullback).

=== Week 4: Central University ===
Vanderbilt drubbed Central University, 45–0. Central and Vanderbilt were both undefeated the previous year, and Central also had claimed a Southern title, on the grounds that Vanderbilt would not play them. Lew Hardage and Ray Morrison and Rabbi Robins all had two touchdowns each. Ammie Sikes and Murrah had one each. The starting lineup was: Morrison (left end), Freeland (left tackle), Huffman (left guard), Morgan (center), C. Brown (right guard), Covington (right tackle), E. Brown (right end). R. Morrison (quarterback), Hardage (left halfback), Collins (right halfback), and Sikes (fullback).

=== Week 5: at Michigan ===
Week 5: Vanderbilt at Michigan

Team	1	2	3	4	Total
Vanderbilt	0	0	3	5	8
• Michigan	0	0	3	6	9

- Date: October 28
- Location: Ferry Field • Ann Arbor, Michigan
- Referee: Bradley Walker

The Michigan Wolverines defeated the Commodores 9 to 8. The game matched Michigan head coach Fielding H. Yost against his former player and brother-in-law, Dan McGugin. Because of the relationship between Yost and McGugin, the two teams played nine times between 1905 and 1923, with Michigan winning eight games and tying one.

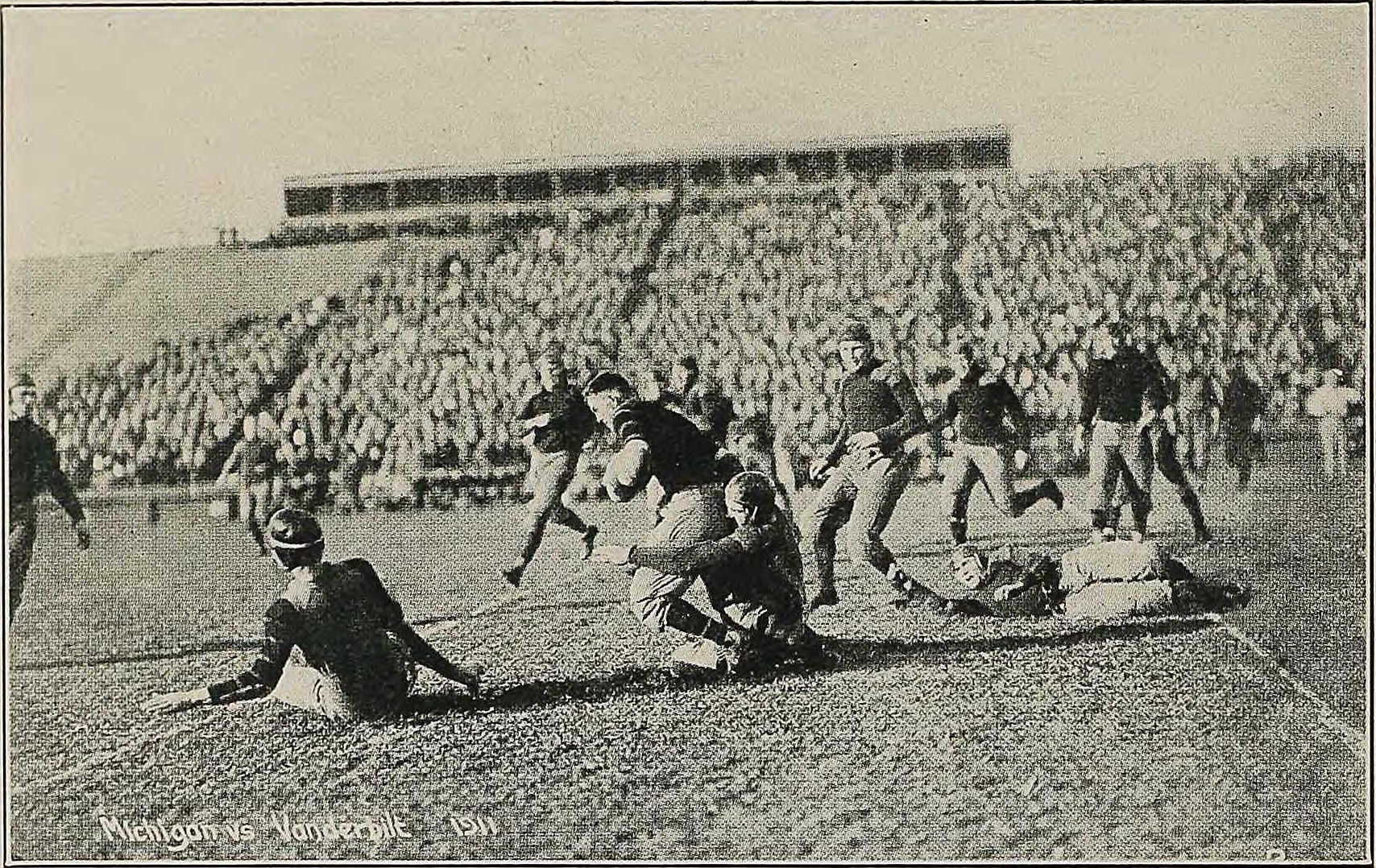
Ray Morrison running against Michigan.

Before the game, Coach Yost reminded reporters that Vanderbilt's 1911 team included the same veteran line that had held Yale scoreless in 1910. Yost predicted a hard game.

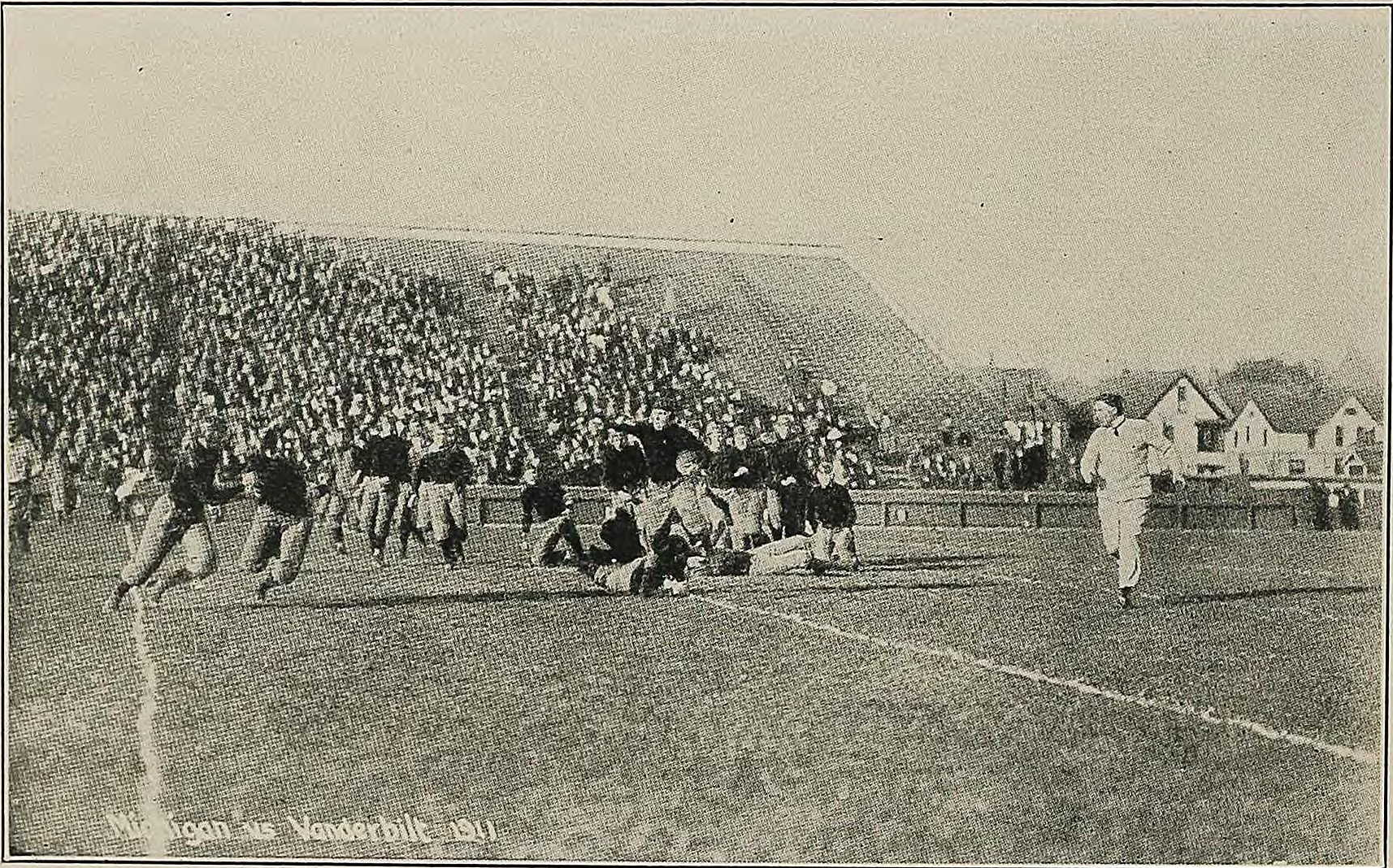
Lew Hardage circling left end.

After a scoreless first half, Zach Curlin made a drop kick to put the Commodores up 3 to 0 in the third quarter. The Vanderbilt University Quarterly notes "when the score was 3 to 0 in our favor the situation in the Michigan grandstands was heartrending." Yost said after the game: "It was one of the most exciting games I have ever witnessed."

Michigan tied up the score with a field goal of its own, then Stanfield Wells scored a touchdown and Frederick L. Conklin kicked goal. Morrison scored a touchdown for Vanderbilt, but put too much energy into the kick-out and missed the crucial extra point.

Walter Eckersall served as the umpire and covered the game for the Chicago Daily Tribune. Eckersall wrote that Michigan's offense suffered from "an air of overconfidence", its tackling was poor, and the team was completely fooled on forward passes. He opined that the game was a reversal for Michigan, which would need "vast improvement" to defeat Penn and Cornell.

The starting lineup was: Morrison (left end), Freeland (left tackle), Metzger (left guard), Morgan (center), C. Brown (right guard), T. Brown (right tackle), E. Brown (right end). R. Morrison (quarterback), Hardage (left halfback), Collins (right halfback), and Sikes (fullback).

=== Week 6: Georgia ===
Week 6: Georgia at Vanderbilt

Team	1	2	3	4	Total
Georgia	0	0	0	0	0
• Vanderbilt	0	12	5	0	17

- Date: November 4
- Location: Dudley Field • Nashville, Tennessee
- Referee: Peter Hauser

Vanderbilt easily defeated the Georgia Bulldogs 17–0 under a "cold, leaden sky" with splashes of rain. After a scoreless first quarter, Lew Hardage called for a fair-catch at Georgia's 28-yard line, starting Vanderbilt's first scoring drive. It ended with an Ammie Sikes touchdown from 2 yards out. Hardage ran around right end for 45 yards, down to the 17-yard line. Vanderbilt then worked the ball to the goal with an 8-yard pass from Hardage to Wilson Collins, followed by Ray Morrison going over for a 4-yard touchdown. On one play later in the period, Hardage's left shoulder and arm were badly sprained, threatening his status for the season.

In the third quarter, Morrison made 22 yards on a fake punt, Sikes went 35 yards through line. Sikes then made 5 more, Collins 1, and Morrison finished with a 4-yard touchdown.

The starting lineup was: K. Morrison (left end), Covington (left tackle), Metzger (left guard), Morgan (center), C. Brown (right guard), T. Brown (right tackle), E. Brown (right end), R. Morrison (quarterback), Hardage (left halfback), Collins (right halfback), and Sikes (fullback).

=== Week 7: Kentucky State College ===
Week 7: Kentucky State College at Vanderbilt

Team	1	2	3	4	Total
Kentucky St.	0	0	0	0	0
• Vanderbilt	6	0	6	6	18

- Date: November 11
- Location: Dudley Field
  Nashville, Tennessee
- Referee: Bradley Walker

The Commodores beat Kentucky State College, 18–0. The Wildcats were expected to lose by a larger margin. The first touchdown came on "a pretty forward pass" from Robins to Nuck Brown. The next score came in the third quarter, on a 7-yard run from Ray Morrison. Just after the start of the fourth quarter, Zach Curlin made an 8-yard field goal. He later made another 10-yard field goal from a difficult angle. The starting lineup was: K. Morrison (left end), Covington (left tackle), Metzger (left guard), Morgan (center), C. Brown (right guard), T. Brown (right tackle), E. Brown (right end), R. Morrison (quarterback), Collins (left halfback), Robins (right halfback), and Sikes (fullback).

=== Week 8: Ole Miss ===
Week 8: Ole Miss at Vanderbilt

Team	1	2	3	4	Total
Miss.	0	0	0	0	0
• Vanderbilt	0	9	6	6	21

- Date: November 18
- Location: Dudley Field
  Nashville, Tennessee

Vanderbilt beat Ole Miss, 21–0, and claimed the championship of the South. "This was easily the greatest southern game of the season".

In the second quarter, a long trick pass was caught by Ammie Sikes, who ran to Ole Miss's 5-yard line. Ray Morrison then got the score. At one point Morrison had a 70-yard run. Zach Curlin later made a field goal. In the second half, Morrison ran 75 yards on a fake punt and went out of bounds at the 30-yard line. On the next play, Lew Hardage started around left end, then reversed right, and was again crowded out, reversing field back around left end. He seemed to break a tackle by every Ole Miss player. Vanderbilt scored a final touchdown in the last quarter.

The starting lineup was: K. Morrison (left end), Covington (left tackle), Metzger (left guard), Morgan (center), C. Brown (right guard), T. Brown (right tackle), E. Brown (right end), R. Morrison (quarterback), Collins (left halfback), Hardage (right halfback), and Sikes (fullback).

=== Week 9: Sewanee and Ty Cobb ===
Ty Cobb traveled to Nashville on the Monday of the week of the Sewanee game to act in the play The College Widow. (Note: Cobb was coming off an American League MVP season with a .420 batting average. He was taken for an automobile ride around the town by Nashville Vols president William G. Hirsig.) Cobb watched the team practice and donned a Vanderbilt uniform to practice with the team during the week, including punts and drop-kicks.

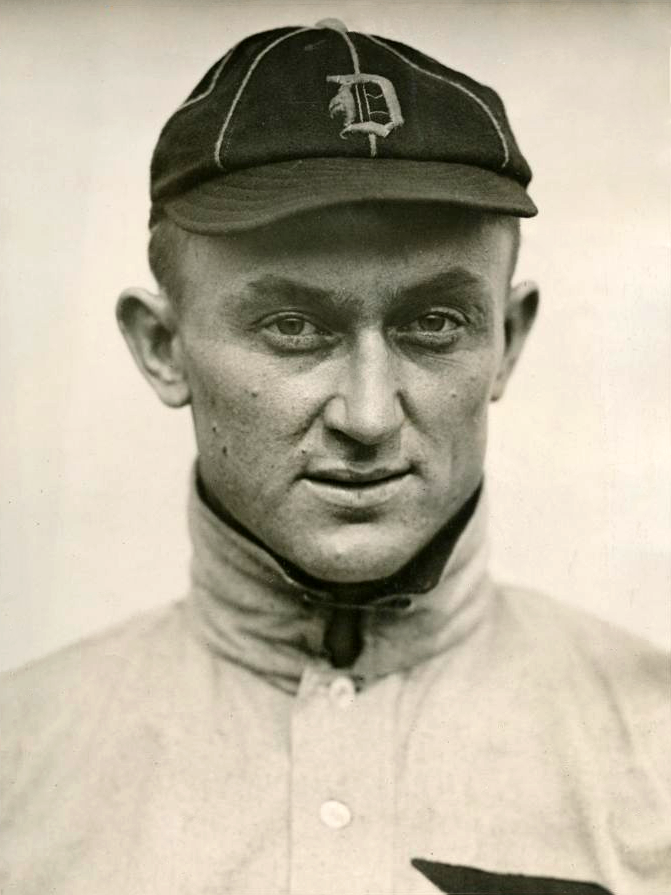
Ty Cobb (pictured) practiced as a Vanderbilt football player in 1911.

Week 9: Sewanee at Vanderbilt

Team	1	2	3	4	Total
Sewanee	0	0	0	0	0
• Vanderbilt	6	11	8	6	31

- Date: November 30
- Location: Dudley Field
  Nashville, Tennessee
- Game start: 2:15 p. m.
- Game attendance: 6,000
- Referee: Bradley Walker

Vanderbilt defeated the Sewanee Tigers 31 to 0. Vanderbilt's first score came on a 3-yard end run from Ray Morrison. In the next period, Will Metzger and Tom Brown blocked a kick. Brown then picked up the ball and ran it in for a touchdown. The next score came on a pass from Morrison to Hardage. After the half, Wilson Collins had a touchdown run over tackle. In the same period, Sewanee had a bad pass from center for a safety. In the final period, Collins had another touchdown behind tackle. Vanderbilt had 455 total yards to Sewanee's 69.

The starting lineup was: K. Morrison (left end), Freeland (left tackle), Metzger (left guard), Morgan (center), C. Brown (right guard), T. Brown (right tackle), E. Brown (right end), Morrison (quarterback), Curlin (right halfback), Hardage (left halfback), and Sikes (fullback). The umpire was Ted Coy.

== After the season ==
=== Awards and honors ===
Vanderbilt claimed an undisputed SIAA and Southern title. "Usually Texas and Arkansas have entered strong claims for the coveted honor, but little Sewanee this year disposed of Texas and in turn Texas disposed of Arkansas." The Atlanta Constitution voted Vanderbilt's the best backfield in the South.

Ewing Freeland, Will Metzger, Hugh Morgan, Morrison, and Hardage were all consensus All-Southern selections. Morrison is considered one of the best quarterbacks in Vanderbilt's long history. He won Bachelor of Ugliness for the class of 1912, and both Morrison and Metzger were later selected for an Associated Press Southeast Area All-Time football team 1869–1919 era.

=== Departures ===
Assistant coach Dr. Owsley Manier left the team to spend the winter of 1911 practicing medicine at the University of Pennsylvania Hospital. As well as Morrison graduating, Freeland went to Texas and Metzger entered into business.

== Personnel ==
=== Coaching staff ===
- Dan McGugin, head coach
- Owsley Manier, assistant
- Sam Costen, assistant
- Frank Gilliland, manager

=== Varsity letterwinners ===
"Wearers of the V"

==== Line ====
Player	Position	Games started	Hometown	Prep school	Height	Weight	Age
Charles H. Brown	Guard	9	Gallatin, Tennessee				24
Enoch Brown	End	9	Franklin, Tennessee	Battle Ground Academy	5'8"	160	
Tom Brown	Tackle	8	Gallatin, Tennessee		6'2"	180	21
Joe Covington	Guard, tackle	5					
Ewing Y. Freeland	Tackle	6	Turnersville, Texas	Mooney School		196	24
Zeke Martin	End	0	Mobile, Alabama	University Military School			
Will Metzger	Guard	8	Nashville, Tennessee	Wallace University School	6'1"	175	21
Hugh Morgan	Center	9	Nashville, Tennessee	Branham & Hughes School		216	18
Kent Morrison	End	8	McKenzie, Tennessee	McTyeire School			

==== Backfield ====
Player	Position	Games started	Hometown	Prep school	Height	Weight	Age
Wilson Collins	Halfback	8	Pulaski, Tennessee		5'9"	165	22
Zach Curlin	Halfback	1	Luxora, Arkansas	Webb School			21
Lew Hardage	Halfback	8	Decatur, Alabama			165	20
Ray Morrison	Quarterback	9	McKenzie, Tennessee	McTyeire School		159	26
Rabbi Robins	Quarterback, halfback	1	Tupelo, Mississippi	McTyeire School			
Ammie Sikes	Fullback	7	Smyrna, Tennessee	Battle Ground Academy		164	19

=== Substitutes ===
Player	Position	Games started	Hometown	Prep school	Height	Weight	Age
Doherty	Fullback	2					

=== Depth chart ===
The following chart provides a visual depiction of Vanderbilt's lineup during the 1911 season with games started at the position reflected in parentheses. The chart mimics a short punt formation while on offense, with the quarterback under center.

LE
Kent Morrison (8)
Will Metzger (1)
Zeke Martin (0)

LT	LG	C	RG	RT
Ewing Y. Freeland (6)	Will Metzger (7)	Hugh Morgan (9)	Charles H. Brown (9)	Tom Brown (8)
Joe Covington (3)	Joe Covington (1)			Joe Covington (1)
	Cecil Huffman (1)			

RE
Enoch Brown (9)

QB
Ray Morrison (9)
Rabbi Robins (0)

LHB	RHB
Lew Hardage (7)	Wilson Collins (6)
Wilson Collins (2)	Zach Curlin (1)
	Lew Hardage (1)
	Rabbi Robins (1)

FB
Ammie Sikes (7)
Doherty (2)

-

== Bibliography ==
- Traughber, Bill (2011). Vanderbilt Football: Tales of Commodore Gridiron History. The History Press. ISBN 978-1-60949-423-0.
- Vanderbilt University (1912). Vanderbilt University Quarterly. Vol. 12.
