= 1911 Auburn Tigers football team =

American college football season

1911 Auburn Tigers football
- Conference: Southern Intercollegiate Athletic Association
- Record: 4–2–1 (4–0–1 SIAA)
- Head coach: Mike Donahue (7th season)
- Base defense: 7–2–2
- Captain: M. S. Bonner
- Home stadium: Drake Field; Rickwood Field

1911 Southern Intercollegiate Athletic Association football standings
	Conf.					Overall
Team	W		L		T	W		L		T
Vanderbilt $	5	–	0	–	0	8	–	1	–	0
Auburn	4	–	0	–	1	4	–	2	–	1
Georgia	5	–	1	–	1	7	–	1	–	1
Georgia Tech	5	–	2	–	1	6	–	2	–	1
Kentucky State	2	–	1	–	0	7	–	3	–	0
LSU	2	–	1	–	0	6	–	3	–	0
Mississippi A&M	4	–	2	–	1	7	–	2	–	1
Alabama	2	–	2	–	2	5	–	2	–	2
Ole Miss	2	–	2	–	0	6	–	3	–	0
Tulane	3	–	3	–	0	5	–	3	–	1
Sewanee	2	–	3	–	0	6	–	3	–	1
Clemson	2	–	4	–	0	3	–	5	–	0
The Citadel	1	–	1	–	0	5	–	2	–	2
Mercer	2	–	5	–	0	4	–	6	–	1
Central University	0	–	2	–	1	3	–	2	–	1
Tennessee	0	–	2	–	1	3	–	4	–	2
Mississippi College	0	–	4	–	0	1	–	5	–	0
Howard (AL)	0	–	6	–	0	1	–	6	–	1
$ – Conference champion

The 1911 Auburn Tigers football team represented Alabama Polytechnic Institute (now known Auburn University) as a member of the Southern Intercollegiate Athletic Association (SIAA) during the 1911 college football season. The team was led by head coach Mike Donahue, in his seventh year, and played their home games at both Drake Field in Auburn and Rickwood Field in Birmingham, Alabama. They finished the season with a record of four wins, two losses, and one tie (4–2–1 overall, 4–0–1 in the SIAA).

== Schedule ==
Date	Opponent	Site	Result	Attendance	Source
October 7	Mercer	Drake Field; Auburn, AL	W 29–0		
October 14	at Clemson	Bowman Field; Calhoun, SC (rivlary)	W 29–0		
October 21	vs. Texas A&M*	Gaston Park; Dallas, TX	L 0–16	7,000	
October 28	Mississippi A&M	Rickwood Field; Birmingham, AL	W 11–5		
November 4	at Georgia Tech	Ponce de Leon Park; Atlanta, GA (rivalry)	W 11–6		
November 18	at Texas*	Clark Field; Austin, TX	L 5–18		
November 29	vs. Georgia	Savannah, GA (rivalry)	T 0–0		
*Non-conference game
