= 1911 Mercer Baptists football team =

American college football season

1911 Mercer Baptists football
- Conference: Southern Intercollegiate Athletic Association
- Record: 4–5–1 (2–5 SIAA)
- Head coach: Charles C. Stroud (2nd season)
- Home stadium: Central City Park

1911 Southern Intercollegiate Athletic Association football standings
	Conf.					Overall
Team	W		L		T	W		L		T
Vanderbilt $	5	–	0	–	0	8	–	1	–	0
Auburn	4	–	0	–	1	4	–	2	–	1
Georgia	5	–	1	–	1	7	–	1	–	1
Georgia Tech	5	–	2	–	1	6	–	2	–	1
Kentucky State	2	–	1	–	0	7	–	3	–	0
LSU	2	–	1	–	0	6	–	3	–	0
Mississippi A&M	4	–	2	–	1	7	–	2	–	1
Alabama	2	–	2	–	2	5	–	2	–	2
Ole Miss	2	–	2	–	0	6	–	3	–	0
Tulane	3	–	3	–	0	5	–	3	–	1
Sewanee	2	–	3	–	0	6	–	3	–	1
Clemson	2	–	4	–	0	3	–	5	–	0
The Citadel	1	–	1	–	0	5	–	2	–	2
Mercer	2	–	5	–	0	4	–	6	–	1
Central University	0	–	2	–	1	3	–	2	–	1
Tennessee	0	–	2	–	1	3	–	4	–	2
Mississippi College	0	–	4	–	0	1	–	5	–	0
Howard (AL)	0	–	6	–	0	1	–	6	–	1
$ – Conference champion

The 1911 Mercer Baptists football team was an American football team that represented Mercer University as a member of the Southern Intercollegiate Athletic Association (SIAA) during the 1911 college football season. In their second year under head coach Charles C. Stroud, the team compiled an 4–5–1 record, with a mark of 2–5 in the SIAA.

== Schedule ==
Date	Opponent	Site	Result	Source
September 23	Locust Grove Institute*	Central City Park; Macon, GA	W 25–0	
September 30	Gordon Institute*	Central City Park; Macon, GA	W 12–0	
October 7	at Auburn	Drake Field; Auburn, AL	L 0–29	
October 14	vs. The Citadel	Savannah, GA	L 0–5	
October 21	at Georgia Tech	Ponce de Leon Park; Atlanta, GA	L 0–17	
October 28	at Georgia	Sanford Field; Athens, GA	L 5–8	
November 4	Ole Miss	Central City Park; Macon, GA	L 0–34	
November 11	vs. Columbia College (FL)*	Valdosta, GA	T 6–6	
November 18	vs. Clemson	Driving Park; Columbus, GA	W 20–6	
November 30	Howard (AL)	Central City Park; Macon, GA	W 29–0	
*Non-conference game
