= 1911 Tulane Olive and Blue football team =

American college football season

1911 Tulane Olive and Blue football
- Conference: Southern Intercollegiate Athletic Association
- Record: 5–3–1 (3–3 SIAA)
- Head coach: Appleton A. Mason (2nd season)
- Captain: T. Semmes Walmsley
- Home stadium: First Tulane Stadium

1911 Southern Intercollegiate Athletic Association football standings
	Conf.					Overall
Team	W		L		T	W		L		T
Vanderbilt $	5	–	0	–	0	8	–	1	–	0
Auburn	4	–	0	–	1	4	–	2	–	1
Georgia	5	–	1	–	1	7	–	1	–	1
Georgia Tech	5	–	2	–	1	6	–	2	–	1
Kentucky State	2	–	1	–	0	7	–	3	–	0
LSU	2	–	1	–	0	6	–	3	–	0
Mississippi A&M	4	–	2	–	1	7	–	2	–	1
Alabama	2	–	2	–	2	5	–	2	–	2
Ole Miss	2	–	2	–	0	6	–	3	–	0
Tulane	3	–	3	–	0	5	–	3	–	1
Sewanee	2	–	3	–	0	6	–	3	–	1
Clemson	2	–	4	–	0	3	–	5	–	0
The Citadel	1	–	1	–	0	5	–	2	–	2
Mercer	2	–	5	–	0	4	–	6	–	1
Central University	0	–	2	–	1	3	–	2	–	1
Tennessee	0	–	2	–	1	3	–	4	–	2
Mississippi College	0	–	4	–	0	1	–	5	–	0
Howard (AL)	0	–	6	–	0	1	–	6	–	1
$ – Conference champion

The 1911 Tulane Olive and Blue football team was an American football team that represented Tulane University as a member of the Southern Intercollegiate Athletic Association (SIAA) during the 1911 college football season. In its second year under head coach Appleton A. Mason, Tulane compiled a 5–3–1 record.

== Schedule ==
Date	Opponent	Site	Result	Source
October 12	Mississippi College	Tulane Stadium; New Orleans, LA	W 10–0	
October 18	Southwestern Louisiana Industrial*	Tulane Stadium; New Orleans, LA	W 27–0	
October 21	Louisiana Normal*	Tulane Stadium; New Orleans, LA	W 45–0	
October 28	Howard (AL)	Tulane Stadium; New Orleans, LA	W 10–0	
November 4	Sewanee	Tulane Stadium; New Orleans, LA	L 3–9	
November 11	at Alabama	The Quad; Tuscaloosa, AL	L 0–22	
November 20	at Mississippi A&M	Hardy Field; Starkville, MS	W 5–4	
November 30	Washington and Lee*	Tulane Stadium; New Orleans, LA	T 5–5	
December 9	at LSU	State Field; Baton Rouge, LA (rivalry)	L 0–6	
*Non-conference game
