= 1911 Mississippi A&M Aggies football team =

American college football season

1911 Mississippi A&M Aggies football

Bacardi Bowl, W 12–0 vs. Cuban Athletic Club
- Conference: Southern Intercollegiate Athletic Association
- Record: 7–2–1 (4–2–1 SIAA)
- Head coach: W. D. Chadwick (3rd season)
- Home stadium: Hardy Field

1911 Southern Intercollegiate Athletic Association football standings
	Conf.					Overall
Team	W		L		T	W		L		T
Vanderbilt $	5	–	0	–	0	8	–	1	–	0
Auburn	4	–	0	–	1	4	–	2	–	1
Georgia	5	–	1	–	1	7	–	1	–	1
Georgia Tech	5	–	2	–	1	6	–	2	–	1
Kentucky State	2	–	1	–	0	7	–	3	–	0
LSU	2	–	1	–	0	6	–	3	–	0
Mississippi A&M	4	–	2	–	1	7	–	2	–	1
Alabama	2	–	2	–	2	5	–	2	–	2
Ole Miss	2	–	2	–	0	6	–	3	–	0
Tulane	3	–	3	–	0	5	–	3	–	1
Sewanee	2	–	3	–	0	6	–	3	–	1
Clemson	2	–	4	–	0	3	–	5	–	0
The Citadel	1	–	1	–	0	5	–	2	–	2
Mercer	2	–	5	–	0	4	–	6	–	1
Central University	0	–	2	–	1	3	–	2	–	1
Tennessee	0	–	2	–	1	3	–	4	–	2
Mississippi College	0	–	4	–	0	1	–	5	–	0
Howard (AL)	0	–	6	–	0	1	–	6	–	1
$ – Conference champion

The 1911 Mississippi A&M Aggies football team represented the Mississippi A&M Aggies of Agricultural and Mechanical College of the State of Mississippi during the 1911 college football season. Before the week of the Egg Bowl rivalry, a new set of stands had been added on the east side of The Fairgrounds in Jackson. As the teams prepared for kickoff the new stands collapsed injuring at least 60 people, some seriously. Despite the disaster, the game proceeded without interruption and resulted in a 6 to 0 A&M win. The Commercial Appeal cited Hunter Kimball's playing at end in the annual Egg Bowl contest as "superb."

== Schedule ==
Date	Opponent	Site	Result	Source
September 29	Mississippi College	Hardy Field; Starkville, MS	W 27–6	
October 7	Southwestern Presbyterian*	Hardy Field; Starkville, MS	W 30–0	
October 14	Howard (AL)	Hardy Field; Starkville, MS	W 48–0	
October 21	Alabama	Columbus Fairgrounds; Columbus, MS (rivalry)	T 6–6	
October 28	at Auburn	Rickwood Field; Birmingham, AL	L 5–11	
November 3	Birmingham*	Hardy Field; Starkville, MS	W 62–0	
November 12	LSU	Gulfport, MS (rivalry)	W 6–0	
November 20	Tulane	Hardy Field; Starkville, MS	L 4–5	
November 30	vs. Ole Miss	State Fairgrounds; Jackson, MS (rivalry)	W 6–0	
January 1, 1912	vs. Cuban Athletic Club*	Almandares Park; Havana, Cuba (Bacardi Bowl)	W 12–0	
*Non-conference game
