= 1911 Ole Miss Rebels football team =

American college football season

1911 Ole Miss Rebels football
- Conference: Southern Intercollegiate Athletic Association
- Record: 6–3 (2–2 SIAA)
- Head coach: Nathan Stauffer (3rd season)
- Captain: Steve Mitchell

1911 Southern Intercollegiate Athletic Association football standings
	Conf.					Overall
Team	W		L		T	W		L		T
Vanderbilt $	5	–	0	–	0	8	–	1	–	0
Auburn	4	–	0	–	1	4	–	2	–	1
Georgia	5	–	1	–	1	7	–	1	–	1
Georgia Tech	5	–	2	–	1	6	–	2	–	1
Kentucky State	2	–	1	–	0	7	–	3	–	0
LSU	2	–	1	–	0	6	–	3	–	0
Mississippi A&M	4	–	2	–	1	7	–	2	–	1
Alabama	2	–	2	–	2	5	–	2	–	2
Ole Miss	2	–	2	–	0	6	–	3	–	0
Tulane	3	–	3	–	0	5	–	3	–	1
Sewanee	2	–	3	–	0	6	–	3	–	1
Clemson	2	–	4	–	0	3	–	5	–	0
The Citadel	1	–	1	–	0	5	–	2	–	2
Mercer	2	–	5	–	0	4	–	6	–	1
Central University	0	–	2	–	1	3	–	2	–	1
Tennessee	0	–	2	–	1	3	–	4	–	2
Mississippi College	0	–	4	–	0	1	–	5	–	0
Howard (AL)	0	–	6	–	0	1	–	6	–	1
$ – Conference champion

The 1911 Ole Miss Rebels football team represented the University of Mississippi during the 1911 college football season. Before the week of the Egg Bowl rivalry, a new set of stands had been added on the east side of The Fairgrounds in Jackson. As the teams prepared for kickoff the new stands collapsed injuring at least 60 people, some seriously. Despite the disaster, the game proceeded without interruption and resulted in a 6 to 0 A&M win. The Commercial Appeal complimented the play of Ole Miss halfback Pete Shields. By Walton and Rube Barker were All-Southern.

== Schedule ==
Date	Time	Opponent	Site	Result	Source
September 30		Memphis High School*	University Field; Oxford, MS	W 42–0	
October 5		Southwestern Presbyterian*	University Field; Oxford, MS	W 41–0	
October 13	3:00 p.m.	Louisiana Industrial*	University Field; Oxford, MS	W 15–0	
October 24		at Henderson*	Arkadelphia, AR	W 24–11	
October 27		at Texas A&M*	Kyle Field; College Station, TX	L 0–17	
October 30		at Mississippi College	Fairgrounds; Jackson, MS	W 28–0	
November 4		at Mercer	Central City Park; Macon, GA	W 34–0	
November 18		at Vanderbilt	Dudley Field; Nashville, TN (rivalry)	L 0–21	
November 30		vs. Mississippi A&M	State Fairgrounds; Jackson, MS (rivalry)	L 0–6	
*Non-conference game; All times are in Central time

== Players ==
=== Line ===
Player	Position	Games started	Hometown	Prep school	Height	Weight	Age
John C. Adams	center						
Rube Barker	tackle						
Fred Carter	guard						
By Walton	end						

=== Backfield ===
Player	Position	Games started	Hometown	Prep school	Height	Weight	Age
William C. Cahall	halfback						
Pete Shields	halfback						
Steve Mitchell	fullback						
