= Rufus Branch =

American football player, planter, and businessman (1890–1969)

Tennessee Volunteers
- Position: Quarterback

Personal information
- Born: July 21, 1890; Millington, Tennessee
- Died: February 27, 1969 (aged 78); Joiner, Arkansas

Career information
- College: Tennessee (1909–1912)

Rufus Cromwell Branch (July 21, 1890 – February 27, 1969) was an American planter and businessman. He played college football for the Tennessee Volunteers football team of the University of Tennessee as a quarterback. He was also a pitcher on the baseball team. He was credited with bringing John Barnhill to the University of Arkansas.

In 1910, Branch threw a 35-yard pass to W. C. Johnson in the 35–5 loss to Georgia. He was captain of the 1911 team.

Branch was also a World War I pilot.

Branch died at his home in Joiner, Arkansas known as the Black Cat Plantation.
