= Farley Moody =

American football player and lawyer (1891–1918)

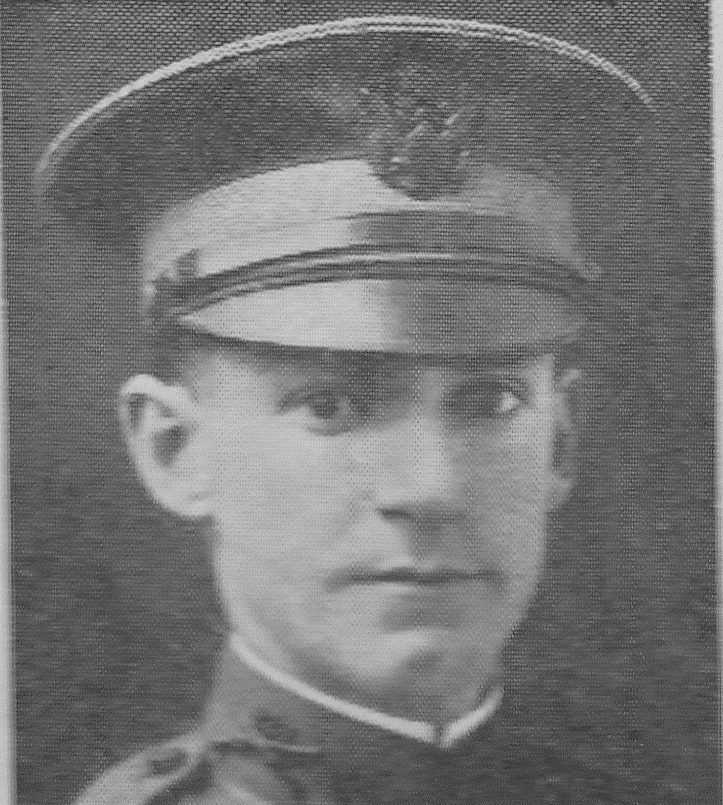
- "Lieut. Farley Moody, Tuscaloosa Ala., fell in the fierce fighting in Argonne Forest"

Biographical details
- Born: September 18, 1891; Tuscaloosa, Alabama, U.S.
- Died: October 11, 1918 (aged 27); Argonne Forest, France

Playing career
- 1909–1912: Alabama
- Position: Quarterback

Coaching career (HC unless noted)
- 1915: Alabama (acting co-HC)

Accomplishments and honors

Awards
- All-Southern (1912)

Farley William Moody (September 18, 1891 – October 11, 1918) was an American college football player and a lawyer.

== Early life ==
Farley Moody was born in Tuscaloosa, Alabama on September 18, 1891, to Frank Sims Moody and Mary Farley Maxwell.

== University of Alabama ==
At Alabama he was a member of Phi Delta Theta.

Moody was a prominent quarterback for the Alabama Crimson Tide of the University of Alabama from 1909 to 1912. He made the field goal to beat Tulane 5 to 3 in 1910. In 1911, Moody scored two touchdowns, including a 40-yard punt return, and added four extra points in the 24 to 0 win over Howard. He was captain of the 1912 team and was selected All-Southern that year.

He coached the 1915 team with athletic director B. L. Noojin after coach Kelley was hospitalized with typhoid fever. The pair had a record of 2 wins and 2 losses.

== Wartime service ==
Lieutenant Moody died in France while serving in the First World War during the Battle of the Argonne Forest just a month before the Armistice.
