= Lloyd Saxon Graham =

American epidemiologist

Lloyd Saxon Graham (January 14, 1922 – May 19, 2012) was an American epidemiologist. Born in Buffalo, New York, Graham completed undergraduate training at Amherst College and earned his PhD from Yale University in 1951. As Chair of the Department of Social and Preventive Medicine at the University at Buffalo, Graham authored work on the nutritional epidemiology of cancer. Graham was author or co-author of over 200 major papers. Graham was a founding Fellow of the American College of Epidemiology and the namesake of two distinguished research prizes at the University of Buffalo, the Saxon Graham Award and Saxon Graham Research Prize, and is commemorated by an ongoing Saxon Graham lecture series on public health. Graham's father-in-law was physician Hugh Jackson Morgan, Chair of the Department of Medicine at Vanderbilt University.
