= 1911 LSU Tigers football team =

American college football season

1911 LSU Tigers football
- Conference: Southern Intercollegiate Athletic Association
- Record: 6–3 (2–1 SIAA)
- Head coach: Pat Dwyer (1st season)
- Captain: Arthur J. "Tommy" Thomas
- Home stadium: State Field

1911 Southern Intercollegiate Athletic Association football standings
	Conf.					Overall
Team	W		L		T	W		L		T
Vanderbilt $	5	–	0	–	0	8	–	1	–	0
Auburn	4	–	0	–	1	4	–	2	–	1
Georgia	5	–	1	–	1	7	–	1	–	1
Georgia Tech	5	–	2	–	1	6	–	2	–	1
Kentucky State	2	–	1	–	0	7	–	3	–	0
LSU	2	–	1	–	0	6	–	3	–	0
Mississippi A&M	4	–	2	–	1	7	–	2	–	1
Alabama	2	–	2	–	2	5	–	2	–	2
Ole Miss	2	–	2	–	0	6	–	3	–	0
Tulane	3	–	3	–	0	5	–	3	–	1
Sewanee	2	–	3	–	0	6	–	3	–	1
Clemson	2	–	4	–	0	3	–	5	–	0
The Citadel	1	–	1	–	0	5	–	2	–	2
Mercer	2	–	5	–	0	4	–	6	–	1
Central University	0	–	2	–	1	3	–	2	–	1
Tennessee	0	–	2	–	1	3	–	4	–	2
Mississippi College	0	–	4	–	0	1	–	5	–	0
Howard (AL)	0	–	6	–	0	1	–	6	–	1
$ – Conference champion

The 1911 LSU Tigers football team represented Louisiana State University (LSU) as a member of the Southern Intercollegiate Athletic Association (SIAA) during the 1911 college football season. Pat Dwyer in his first season as head coach, the Tigers compiled an overall record of 6–3 with a mark of 2–1 in SIAA play.

== Schedule ==
Date	Opponent	Site	Result	Source
October 7	Southwestern Louisiana*	State Field; Baton Rouge, LA	W 42–0	
October 14	Louisiana Normal*	State Field; Baton Rouge, LA	W 46–0	
October 20	Mississippi College	State Field; Baton Rouge, LA	W 40–0	
October 28	Meteor Athletic Club*	State Field; Baton Rouge, LA	W 40–0	
November 4	at Baylor*	Waco, TX	W 6–0	
November 12	vs. Mississippi A&M	Gulfport, MS (rivalry)	L 0–6	
November 18	vs. Southwestern (TX)*	West End Park; Houston, TX	L 6–15	
November 30	vs. Arkansas*	West End Park; Little Rock, AR (rivalry)	L 0–11	
December 9	Tulane	State Field; Baton Rouge, LA (rivalry)	W 6–0	
*Non-conference game
