= 1911 College Basketball All-Southern Team =

The 1911 College Basketball All-Southern Team consisted of basketball players from the South chosen at their respective positions.

== All-Southerns ==
=== Guards ===
- Roy Cook, Mercer (CCS)
- Louis Seelbach, Central (CCS)
- Biscoe Seals, Birmingham A. C. (BN)

=== Forwards ===
- Zeke Martin, Vanderbilt (CCS)
- Tillou Forbes, Georgia (CCS)
- Harry Chairsell, Birmingham A. C. (BN)
- Tom Soost, Mobile YMCA (BN)

=== Center ===
- Will Seelbach, Central (CCS)
- Bud Massey, Columbus YMCA (BN [as g])
- Woodie Penny, Mobile YMCA (BN)

== Key ==
- CCS = selected by C. C. Stroud, Mercer coach. E. A. Major of Auburn was placed as an alternate center.
- BN = published in Birmingham News.
