= 1911 Davidson football team =

American college football season

1911 Davidson football
- Conference: Independent
- Record: 5–3
- Head coach: Edwin W. Holladay (1st season)
- Home stadium: Sprunt Athletic Field

1911 Southern college football independents records
	Conf.			Overall
Team	W	L	T	W		L		T
Oklahoma		–		8	–	0	–	0
Florida		–		5	–	0	–	1
VMI		–		7	–	1	–	0
Texas A&M		–		6	–	1	–	0
Georgetown		–		7	–	1	–	1
Navy		–		6	–	0	–	3
North Carolina		–		6	–	1	–	1
VPI		–		6	–	1	–	2
Virginia		–		8	–	2	–	0
Louisiana Industrial		–		4	–	1	–	1
Marshall		–		4	–	1	–	1
Arkansas		–		6	–	2	–	1
Oklahoma A&M		–		5	–	2	–	0
Texas		–		5	–	2	–	0
Washington and Lee		–		4	–	2	–	2
West Virginia		–		6	–	3	–	0
Davidson		–		5	–	3	–	0
North Carolina A&M		–		5	–	3	–	0
Chattanooga		–		3	–	2	–	0
Catholic University		–		3	–	2	–	2
Maryland		–		4	–	4	–	2
Baylor		–		3	–	4	–	2
Wake Forest		–		3	–	5	–	0
Delaware		–		2	–	5	–	2
South Carolina		–		1	–	4	–	2
Southwestern Louisiana Industrial		–		1	–	4	–	1
Spring Hill		–		1	–	3	–	0
Southwest Texas State		–		1	–	3	–	0
Stetson		–		1	–	3	–	0
Birmingham		–		0	–	6	–	1
Middle Tennessee State Normal		–		0	–	1	–	0

The 1911 Davidson football team was an American football team that represented the Davidson College as an independent during the 1911 college football season. In their first year under head coach Edwin W. Holladay, the team compiled a 5–3 record.

== Schedule ==
Date	Opponent	Site	Result	Source
September 30	Catawba	Sprunt Athletic Field; Davidson, NC	W 35–0	
October 7	vs. VMI	Roanoke Fair Grounds; Roanoke, VA	L 0–5	
October 14	Lenoir	Sprunt Athletic Field; Davidson, NC	W 70–0	
October 21	vs. North Carolina	Latta Park; Charlotte, NC	L 0–5	
November 4	vs. College of Charleston	Latta Park; Charlotte, NC	W 26–3	
November 11	vs. Wake Forest	Cone Athletic Park (II); Greensboro, NC	W 9–0	
November 18	at South Carolina	Davis Field; Columbia, SC	W 10–0	
November 30	at Alabama	Birmingham Fairgrounds; Birmingham, AL	L 6–16	
