= 1911 Kentucky State College Wildcats football team =

American college football season

1911 Kentucky State College Wildcats football
- Conference: Southern Intercollegiate Athletic Association
- Record: 7–3 (2–1 SIAA)
- Head coach: Prentiss Douglass (1st season)
- Captain: Tom Earle
- Home stadium: Stoll Field

1911 Southern Intercollegiate Athletic Association football standings
	Conf.					Overall
Team	W		L		T	W		L		T
Vanderbilt $	5	–	0	–	0	8	–	1	–	0
Auburn	4	–	0	–	1	4	–	2	–	1
Georgia	5	–	1	–	1	7	–	1	–	1
Georgia Tech	5	–	2	–	1	6	–	2	–	1
Kentucky State	2	–	1	–	0	7	–	3	–	0
LSU	2	–	1	–	0	6	–	3	–	0
Mississippi A&M	4	–	2	–	1	7	–	2	–	1
Alabama	2	–	2	–	2	5	–	2	–	2
Ole Miss	2	–	2	–	0	6	–	3	–	0
Tulane	3	–	3	–	0	5	–	3	–	1
Sewanee	2	–	3	–	0	6	–	3	–	1
Clemson	2	–	4	–	0	3	–	5	–	0
The Citadel	1	–	1	–	0	5	–	2	–	2
Mercer	2	–	5	–	0	4	–	6	–	1
Central University	0	–	2	–	1	3	–	2	–	1
Tennessee	0	–	2	–	1	3	–	4	–	2
Mississippi College	0	–	4	–	0	1	–	5	–	0
Howard (AL)	0	–	6	–	0	1	–	6	–	1
$ – Conference champion

The 1911 Kentucky State College Wildcats football team represented Kentucky State College—now known as the University of Kentucky—as a member of the Southern Intercollegiate Athletic Association (SIAA) during the 1911 college football season. Led by Prentiss Douglass in his first and only season as head coach, the Wildcats compiled an overall record of 7–3 with a mark of 2–1 in SIAA play. The team was upset by Transylvania. The Kentucky Intercollegiate Athletic Association suspended Kentucky State.

== Schedule ==
Date	Time	Opponent	Site	Result	Source
September 30		Maryville (TN)	Stoll Field; Lexington, KY	W 13–0	
October 7		Morris Harvey	Stoll Field; Lexington, KY	W 12–0	
October 14		at Miami (OH)	Oxford, OH	W 12–0	
October 21		Lexington High School	Stoll Field; Lexington, KY	W 17–0	
October 28	2:30 p.m.	Cincinnati	Stoll Field; Lexington, KY	L 0–6	
November 4		at Georgetown (KY)	Hinton Field; Georgetown, KY	W 0–18	
November 11		at Vanderbilt	Dudley Field; Nashville, TN (rivalry)	L 18–0	
November 18		Transylvania	Lexington, KY	L 5–12	
November 23		Central University (KY)	Stoll Field; Lexington, KY (rivalry)	W 8–5	
November 30		Tennessee	Stoll Field; Lexington, KY (rivalry)	W 12–0	
