= 1912 Mississippi College Collegians football team =

American college football season

1912 Mississippi College Collegians football
- Conference: Southern Intercollegiate Athletic Association
- Record: 3–4 (1–4 SIAA)
- Head coach: Dale E. Chadwick (3rd season)
- Home stadium: Provine Field

1912 Southern Intercollegiate Athletic Association football standings
	Conf.					Overall
Team	W		L		T	W		L		T
Vanderbilt $	3	–	0	–	1	8	–	1	–	1
Texas A&M	2	–	0	–	0	8	–	1	–	0
Kentucky State	1	–	0	–	0	7	–	2	–	0
Auburn	6	–	1	–	1	6	–	1	–	1
Georgia	5	–	1	–	1	6	–	1	–	1
Sewanee	2	–	1	–	2	5	–	1	–	2
Georgia Tech	5	–	3	–	0	5	–	3	–	1
Alabama	3	–	3	–	1	5	–	3	–	1
Tulane	3	–	3	–	0	5	–	3	–	0
Mississippi A&M	3	–	3	–	0	4	–	3	–	0
Clemson	3	–	3	–	0	4	–	4	–	0
Ole Miss	2	–	2	–	0	5	–	3	–	0
Mercer	2	–	3	–	1	5	–	3	–	1
LSU	2	–	3	–	0	4	–	3	–	0
Mississippi College	1	–	4	–	0	3	–	4	–	0
Tennessee	1	–	4	–	0	4	–	4	–	0
Florida	0	–	2	–	1	5	–	2	–	1
Central University	0	–	2	–	0	4	–	5	–	0
The Citadel	0	–	3	–	0	2	–	4	–	0
Howard (AL)	0	–	4	–	0	1	–	7	–	0
$ – Conference champion

The 1912 Mississippi College Collegians football team was an American football team that represented Mississippi College as a member of the Southern Intercollegiate Athletic Association (SIAA) in the 1912 college football season. Led by Dale E. Chadwick in his third season as head coach, the team compiled an overall record of 3–4 and with a mark of 1–4 against SIAA competition.

== Schedule ==
Date	Opponent	Site	Result	Source
September 27	Vicksburg Athletic Club*	Provine Field; Clinton, MS	W 44–0	
October 4	at Mississippi A&M	Hardy Field; Starkville, MS	L 0–19	
October 11	at LSU	State Field; Baton Rouge, LA	L 0–45	
October 19	at Tulane	Tulane Stadium; New Orleans, LA	L 6–19	
November 1	at Ole Miss	University Field; Oxford, MS	L 0–12	
November 16	Louisiana Industrial*	Provine Field; Clinton, MS	W 14–13	
November 28	vs. Howard (AL)	Kamper Park; Hattiesburg, MS	W 20–0	
*Non-conference game
