= 1911 Tennessee Volunteers football team =

American college football season

1911 Tennessee Volunteers football
- Conference: Southern Intercollegiate Athletic Association
- Record: 3–4–2 (0–2–1 SIAA)
- Head coach: Zora Clevenger (1st season)
- Offensive scheme: Straight T
- Base defense: Multiple
- Captain: Rufus Branch
- Home stadium: Waite Field

1911 Southern Intercollegiate Athletic Association football standings
	Conf.					Overall
Team	W		L		T	W		L		T
Vanderbilt $	5	–	0	–	0	8	–	1	–	0
Auburn	4	–	0	–	1	4	–	2	–	1
Georgia	5	–	1	–	1	7	–	1	–	1
Georgia Tech	5	–	2	–	1	6	–	2	–	1
Kentucky State	2	–	1	–	0	7	–	3	–	0
LSU	2	–	1	–	0	6	–	3	–	0
Mississippi A&M	4	–	2	–	1	7	–	2	–	1
Alabama	2	–	2	–	2	5	–	2	–	2
Ole Miss	2	–	2	–	0	6	–	3	–	0
Tulane	3	–	3	–	0	5	–	3	–	1
Sewanee	2	–	3	–	0	6	–	3	–	1
Clemson	2	–	4	–	0	3	–	5	–	0
The Citadel	1	–	1	–	0	5	–	2	–	2
Mercer	2	–	5	–	0	4	–	6	–	1
Central University	0	–	2	–	1	3	–	2	–	1
Tennessee	0	–	2	–	1	3	–	4	–	2
Mississippi College	0	–	4	–	0	1	–	5	–	0
Howard (AL)	0	–	6	–	0	1	–	6	–	1
$ – Conference champion

The 1911 Tennessee Volunteers football team was an American football team that represented the University of Tennessee as a member of the Southern Intercollegiate Athletic Association (SIAA) during the 1911 college football season. In their first year under head coach Zora Clevenger, the team compiled a 3–4–2 record. Prior to coming to Tennessee, Clevenger coached at Nebraska Wesleyan University.

== Schedule ==
Date	Opponent	Site	Result	Source
October 7	Mooney School*	Waite Field; Knoxville, TN	W 27–0	
October 14	at Georgia Tech	Ponce de Leon Park; Atlanta, GA (rivalry)	L 0–24	
October 21	Maryville (TN)*	Waite Field; Knoxville, TN	W 22–5	
October 28	at North Carolina A&M*	Riddick Stadium; Raleigh, NC	L 0–16	
November 4	Central University	Waite Field; Knoxville, TN	T 0–0	
November 11	at VPI*	Miles Field; Blacksburg, VA	L 11–36	
November 18	Southwestern Presbyterian*	Waite Field; Knoxville, TN	W 22–0	
November 25	at Tennessee Docs*	Red Elm Park; Memphis, TN	T 0–0	
November 30	at Kentucky State College	Lexington, KY (rivalry)	L 0–12	
*Non-conference game
