= 1911 The Citadel Bulldogs football team =

American college football season

1911 The Citadel Bulldogs football
- Conference: Southern Intercollegiate Athletic Association
- Record: 5–2–2 (1–1 SIAA)
- Head coach: Louis LeTellier (1st season)
- Captain: Roland Walsh
- Home stadium: College Park Stadium

1911 Southern Intercollegiate Athletic Association football standings
	Conf.					Overall
Team	W		L		T	W		L		T
Vanderbilt $	5	–	0	–	0	8	–	1	–	0
Auburn	4	–	0	–	1	4	–	2	–	1
Georgia	5	–	1	–	1	7	–	1	–	1
Georgia Tech	5	–	2	–	1	6	–	2	–	1
Kentucky State	2	–	1	–	0	7	–	3	–	0
LSU	2	–	1	–	0	6	–	3	–	0
Mississippi A&M	4	–	2	–	1	7	–	2	–	1
Alabama	2	–	2	–	2	5	–	2	–	2
Ole Miss	2	–	2	–	0	6	–	3	–	0
Tulane	3	–	3	–	0	5	–	3	–	1
Sewanee	2	–	3	–	0	6	–	3	–	1
Clemson	2	–	4	–	0	3	–	5	–	0
The Citadel	1	–	1	–	0	5	–	2	–	2
Mercer	2	–	5	–	0	4	–	6	–	1
Central University	0	–	2	–	1	3	–	2	–	1
Tennessee	0	–	2	–	1	3	–	4	–	2
Mississippi College	0	–	4	–	0	1	–	5	–	0
Howard (AL)	0	–	6	–	0	1	–	6	–	1
$ – Conference champion

The 1911 The Citadel Bulldogs football team represented The Citadel as a member of the Southern Intercollegiate Athletic Association during the 1911 college football season. This was the seventh year of intercollegiate football at The Citadel, with Louis LeTellier serving as coach for the first season. All home games are believed to have been played at College Park Stadium in Hampton Park.

== Schedule ==
Date	Opponent	Site	Result	Source
September 30	Charleston Navy*	College Park Stadium; Charleston, SC	T 0–0	
October 7	at Florida*	University Athletic Field; Gainesville, FL	L 3–15	
October 14	vs. Mercer	Savannah, GA	W 5–0	
October 28	College of Charleston*	College Park Stadium; Charleston, SC	W 21–0	
November 4	Clemson	College Park Stadium; Charleston, SC	L 0–18	
November 11	Porter Military Academy*	College Park Stadium; Charleston, SC	W 6–0	
November 18	College of Charleston*	College Park Stadium; Charleston, SC	W 21–3	
November 30	South Carolina*	College Park Stadium; Charleston, SC	T 0–0	
December 2	Parris Island Marines*	College Park Stadium; Charleston, SC	W 17–10	
*Non-conference game
