= 1911 Howard Baptists football team =

American college football season

1911 Howard Baptists football
- Conference: Southern Intercollegiate Athletic Association
- Record: 1–6–1 (0–6 SIAA)
- Head coach: John B. Longwell (2nd season)
- Home stadium: Alabama State Fairgrounds

1911 Southern Intercollegiate Athletic Association football standings
	Conf.					Overall
Team	W		L		T	W		L		T
Vanderbilt $	5	–	0	–	0	8	–	1	–	0
Auburn	4	–	0	–	1	4	–	2	–	1
Georgia	5	–	1	–	1	7	–	1	–	1
Georgia Tech	5	–	2	–	1	6	–	2	–	1
Kentucky State	2	–	1	–	0	7	–	3	–	0
LSU	2	–	1	–	0	6	–	3	–	0
Mississippi A&M	4	–	2	–	1	7	–	2	–	1
Alabama	2	–	2	–	2	5	–	2	–	2
Ole Miss	2	–	2	–	0	6	–	3	–	0
Tulane	3	–	3	–	0	5	–	3	–	1
Sewanee	2	–	3	–	0	6	–	3	–	1
Clemson	2	–	4	–	0	3	–	5	–	0
The Citadel	1	–	1	–	0	5	–	2	–	2
Mercer	2	–	5	–	0	4	–	6	–	1
Central University	0	–	2	–	1	3	–	2	–	1
Tennessee	0	–	2	–	1	3	–	4	–	2
Mississippi College	0	–	4	–	0	1	–	5	–	0
Howard (AL)	0	–	6	–	0	1	–	6	–	1
$ – Conference champion

The 1911 Howard Baptists football team was an American football team that represented Howard College (now known as the Samford University) as a member of the Southern Intercollegiate Athletic Association (SIAA) during the 1911 college football season. In their second year under head coach John B. Longwell, the team compiled an 1–6–1 record.

== Schedule ==
Date	Opponent	Site	Result	Source
September 30	at Alabama	The Quad; Tuscaloosa, AL	L 0–24	
October 7	Georgia Tech	Alabama State Fairgrounds; Birmingham, AL	L 0–28	
October 13	at Mississippi A&M	Hardy Field; Starkville, MS	L 0–48	
October 21	at Clemson	Bowman Field; Calhoun, SC	L 0–14	
October 28	at Tulane	Tulane Stadium; New Orleans, LA	L 0–10	
November 10	Southern (AL)*	Alabama State Fairgrounds; Birmingham, AL	T 0–0	
November 17	vs. Birmingham*	Rickwood Field; Birmingham, AL	W 6–5	
November 30	at Mercer	Central City Park; Macon, GA	L 0–29	
*Non-conference game
