= 1911 Mississippi College Collegians football team =

American college football season

1911 Mississippi College Collegians football
- Conference: Southern Intercollegiate Athletic Association
- Record: 1–5 (0–4 SIAA)
- Head coach: Dale E. Chadwick (2nd season)

1911 Southern Intercollegiate Athletic Association football standings
	Conf.					Overall
Team	W		L		T	W		L		T
Vanderbilt $	5	–	0	–	0	8	–	1	–	0
Auburn	4	–	0	–	1	4	–	2	–	1
Georgia	5	–	1	–	1	7	–	1	–	1
Georgia Tech	5	–	2	–	1	6	–	2	–	1
Kentucky State	2	–	1	–	0	7	–	3	–	0
LSU	2	–	1	–	0	6	–	3	–	0
Mississippi A&M	4	–	2	–	1	7	–	2	–	1
Alabama	2	–	2	–	2	5	–	2	–	2
Ole Miss	2	–	2	–	0	6	–	3	–	0
Tulane	3	–	3	–	0	5	–	3	–	1
Sewanee	2	–	3	–	0	6	–	3	–	1
Clemson	2	–	4	–	0	3	–	5	–	0
The Citadel	1	–	1	–	0	5	–	2	–	2
Mercer	2	–	5	–	0	4	–	6	–	1
Central University	0	–	2	–	1	3	–	2	–	1
Tennessee	0	–	2	–	1	3	–	4	–	2
Mississippi College	0	–	4	–	0	1	–	5	–	0
Howard (AL)	0	–	6	–	0	1	–	6	–	1
$ – Conference champion

The 1911 Mississippi College Collegians football team was an American football team that represented Mississippi College as a member of the Southern Intercollegiate Athletic Association (SIAA) in the 1911 college football season. Led by Dale E. Chadwick in his second season as head coach, the team compiled an overall record of 1–5 and with a mark of 0–4 against SIAA competition.

== Schedule ==
Date	Opponent	Site	Result	Source
September 29	at Mississippi A&M	Hardy Field; Starkville, MS	L 6–27	
October 7	Southern (AL)*	Clinton, MS	W 5–0	
October 12	at Tulane	Tulane Stadium; New Orleans, LA	L 0–10	
October 20	at LSU	State Field; Baton Rouge, LA	L 0–40	
October 30	vs. Ole Miss	Fairgrounds; Jackson, MS	L 0–28	
November 10	at Louisiana Industrial*	Athletic Field; Ruston, LA	L 0–25	
*Non-conference game
