= Dale E. Chadwick =

American football coach and collegiate athletic director

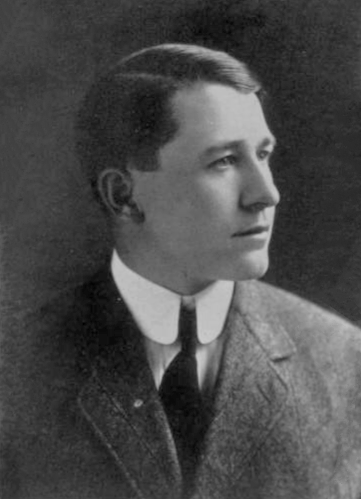
- Chadwick, pictured in L'Aleggro, 1912, Mississippi College yearbook

Biographical details
- Education: Marietta (1900)

Coaching career (HC unless noted)
- 1905–1906: Marietta (assistant)
- 1907: Albion (assistant)
- 1908: Shurtleff
- 1909: Dakota Wesleyan
- 1910–1912: Mississippi College

Administrative career (AD unless noted)
- 1908–1909: Shurtleff
- 1909–1910: Dakota Wesleyan

Head coaching record
- Overall: 13–16–1

Dale Eugene Chadwick was an American college football coach and collegiate athletic director. He was a graduate of Marietta College in Marietta, Ohio. He served as the head football coach at Shurtleff College in Alton, Illinois in 1908, at Dakota Wesleyan University in Mitchell, South Dakota in 1909, and at Mississippi College in Clinton, Mississippi from 1910 to 1912.

== Head coaching record ==
=== Football ===
Year	Team	Overall	Conference	Standing	Bowl/playoffs
Shurtleff (Independent) (1908)
1908	Shurtleff	6–2			
Shurtleff:		6–2			
Dakota Wesleyan (Independent) (1909)
1909	Dakota Wesleyan	3–1			
Dakota Wesleyan:		3–1			
Mississippi College Collegians (Independent) (1910)
1910	Mississippi College	0–4			
Mississippi College Collegians (Southern Intercollegiate Athletic Association) (1911–1912)
1911	Mississippi College	1–5	0–4	17th	
1912	Mississippi College	3–4	1–4	15th	
Mississippi College:		4–13	1–8		
Total:		13–16–1			
