= By Walton =

Biographical details
- Education: University of Mississippi

Playing career
- 1910–1912: Ole Miss
- Positions: Center; End (football)

Coaching career (HC unless noted)
- 1911–1912: Ole Miss

Accomplishments and honors

Awards
- All-Southern football player (1911)

Byron S. "By" Walton was an American college football player, track star, and basketball player and coach at the University of Mississippi.

== Early years ==
Walton attended Central High School in Philadelphia, Pennsylvania.

== Ole Miss ==
He stood 6 feet tall and weighed 180 pounds.

=== Football ===
Walton was a prominent end for the Ole Miss Rebels football team. He was nominated though not selected for an Associated Press All-Time Southeast 1869–1919 era team.

==== 1911 ====
He was selected All-Southern in 1911. He once stripped Ray Morrison of Vanderbilt 10 yards short of the goal. Heisman describes Walton: "This chap weighs 180 stripped, is fast as a deer, willing as a shepherd dog, strong as an ox, and has the judgment of a football player. Against Mercer and Vanderbilt he was simply invulnerable; nothing could get around his end. And when it came to getting down the field and nailing his man under punts he proved himself a perfect demon."

=== Basketball ===
He played center and was captain and coach of the basketball team in 1911–1912.

== Penn ==
Walton also attended the University of Pennsylvania.

== Camp athletics ==
In 1917 Walton was appointed by the Fosdick Commission to direct Army camp athletics in Syracuse, New York.
