= Zeke Martin (basketball) =

American basketball player and coach (1884–1976)

Biographical details
- Born: December 17, 1884; Mobile, Alabama, U.S.
- Died: March 1, 1976 (aged 91)

Playing career
- 1911–1912: Vanderbilt
- Positions: Forward, End (football)

Coaching career (HC unless noted)

Basketball
- 1907–1908: Miami (Ohio)
- 1910–1912: Vanderbilt

Head coaching record
- Overall: 17–11

Accomplishments and honors

Awards
- All-Southern (1911)

Carl Taylor "Zeke" Martin (December 17, 1884 – March 1, 1976) was a college basketball player and coach, as well as a mechanical engineer. He was a player-coach for the Vanderbilt Commodores in 1911 and 1912. He was a forward. Charles C. Stroud selected him All-Southern in 1911. According to Stroud, "Martin is not only fast on his feet, and a good shot, as every forward must be, but he is slippery and quick to dodge or wriggle from the bunch. Only a rugged guard can cover him, as he is strong at shaking free." He was also an end on Dan McGugin's Vanderbilt football team. He was a native of Mobile, Alabama and is the namesake of nearby Zeke's Landing, and the "Mar" in Romar Beach. He was once suspended from coaching the team for spending extra days on the beach in Mobile.
