= 1911 Central University football team =

American college football season

1911 Central University football
- Conference: Southern Intercollegiate Athletic Association
- Record: 4–2–1 (0–2–1 SIAA)
- Head coach: M. B. Banks (3rd season)
- Home stadium: Cheek Field

1911 Southern Intercollegiate Athletic Association football standings
	Conf.					Overall
Team	W		L		T	W		L		T
Vanderbilt $	5	–	0	–	0	8	–	1	–	0
Auburn	4	–	0	–	1	4	–	2	–	1
Georgia	5	–	1	–	1	7	–	1	–	1
Georgia Tech	5	–	2	–	1	6	–	2	–	1
Kentucky State	2	–	1	–	0	7	–	3	–	0
LSU	2	–	1	–	0	6	–	3	–	0
Mississippi A&M	4	–	2	–	1	7	–	2	–	1
Alabama	2	–	2	–	2	5	–	2	–	2
Ole Miss	2	–	2	–	0	6	–	3	–	0
Tulane	3	–	3	–	0	5	–	3	–	1
Sewanee	2	–	3	–	0	6	–	3	–	1
Clemson	2	–	4	–	0	3	–	5	–	0
The Citadel	1	–	1	–	0	5	–	2	–	2
Mercer	2	–	5	–	0	4	–	6	–	1
Central University	0	–	2	–	1	3	–	2	–	1
Tennessee	0	–	2	–	1	3	–	4	–	2
Mississippi College	0	–	4	–	0	1	–	5	–	0
Howard (AL)	0	–	6	–	0	1	–	6	–	1
$ – Conference champion

The 1911 Central University football team represented Central University of Kentucky (now known as Centre College) as a member the Southern Intercollegiate Athletic Association (SIAA) during the 1911 college football season. Led by third-year head coach M. B. Banks, the Colonels compiled an overall record of 4–2–1, with a mark of 0–2–1 in conference play.

== Schedule ==
Date	Opponent	Site	Result	Source
October 14	Central University Alumni*	Cheek Field; Danville, KY	W 30–0	
October 21	at Vanderbilt	Dudley Field; Nashville, TN	L 0–45	
October 28	vs. Rose Polytechnic*	High School Park; Louisville, KY	W 11–5	
November 4	at Tennessee	Waite Field; Knoxville, TN	T 0–0	
November 18	Georgetown (KY)*	Cheek Field; Danville, KY	W 27–0	
November 23	at Kentucky State College	Stoll Field; Lexington, KY (rivalry)	L 5–8	
November 30	at Transylvania*	Thomas Field; Lexington, KY	W 10–6	
*Non-conference game
