= Hugh Jackson Morgan =

American internist and medical professor

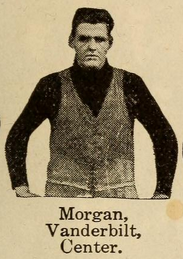
- Morgan in Spalding's Football Guide c. 1911
- Born: 1893; Nashville, Tennessee
- Died: 1961 (aged 67–68); Nashville, Tennessee
- Education: Vanderbilt University; Johns Hopkins University
- Known for: internist, professor
- Scientific career
- Workplaces: School of Medicine; Vanderbilt University
- Football career

Vanderbilt Commodores
- Position: Center

Personal information
- Listed weight: 216 lb (98 kg)

Career information
- College: Vanderbilt (1910–1912)

Awards and highlights
- All-Southern (1911, 1912)

Hugh Jackson "Buddy" Morgan (1893–1961) was an internist and medical professor, who served as Chair of the Department of Medicine at the Vanderbilt University School of Medicine from 1935 to 1959, President of the American College of Physicians, and Chief Medical Consultant to the Surgeon General of the United States Army during the Second World War. In his youth he was an accomplished college football player.

== Early life and education ==
Hugh Jackson Morgan was born into a prominent Nashville, Tennessee family in 1893 and graduated from Vanderbilt University in 1914. The Jackson family's ancestral home, Forks of Cypress, remains a landmark in Florence, Alabama. A scholar and athlete, he was a prominent member of the Vanderbilt varsity football team and was selected as an All Southern center. Morgan played on the 1911 and 1912 SIAA championship teams. He was nominated though not selected for an Associated Press All-Time Southeast 1869-1919 era team.

== Academia ==
After two years at Vanderbilt Medical School, he transferred to Johns Hopkins University and received his doctorate in 1918. As a medical student, Dr. Morgan served in the prestigious Hopkins unit during World War I, and was stationed primarily in France. After the war, Morgan professed at both Hopkins and the Rockefeller Institute before returning home to Nashville in 1925 to accept an offered position as associate professor of medicine. Morgan became Chair of the Department of Medicine in 1935.

== World War II ==
During World War II, Dr. Morgan entered the U.S. Army as a Brigadier General, appointed Chief Medical Consultant to the Surgeon General. This position entailed the clinical oversight and direction of field military medical personnel in all four theaters of the war.

== Legacy ==
A former colleague wrote of Dr. Morgan, "He was a charming man with firm convictions. He was courteous, gallant, and had a warm twinkling humor. He was delicately sensitive to and careful of the smallest human weaknesses and respected the well-grounded opinions of others." Dr. Hugh Morgan's contributions to Vanderbilt and the U.S. Army were many. Morgan is honored namesake of multiple chairs and endowments, most notably the Hugh J Morgan Chair in Medicine.

Hugh J. Morgan died in his Nashville, Tennessee home in 1961 of cancer. Morgan's son-in-law was prominent cancer researcher Lloyd Saxon Graham. Morgan's son, Hugh J. Morgan Jr, is a former chairman of Sonat; Morgan's son Robert P. Morgan is a composer and music theorist on the faculty of Yale University.
