= Ponce de Leon Park =

Ballpark in Atlanta, Georgia

- Poncey
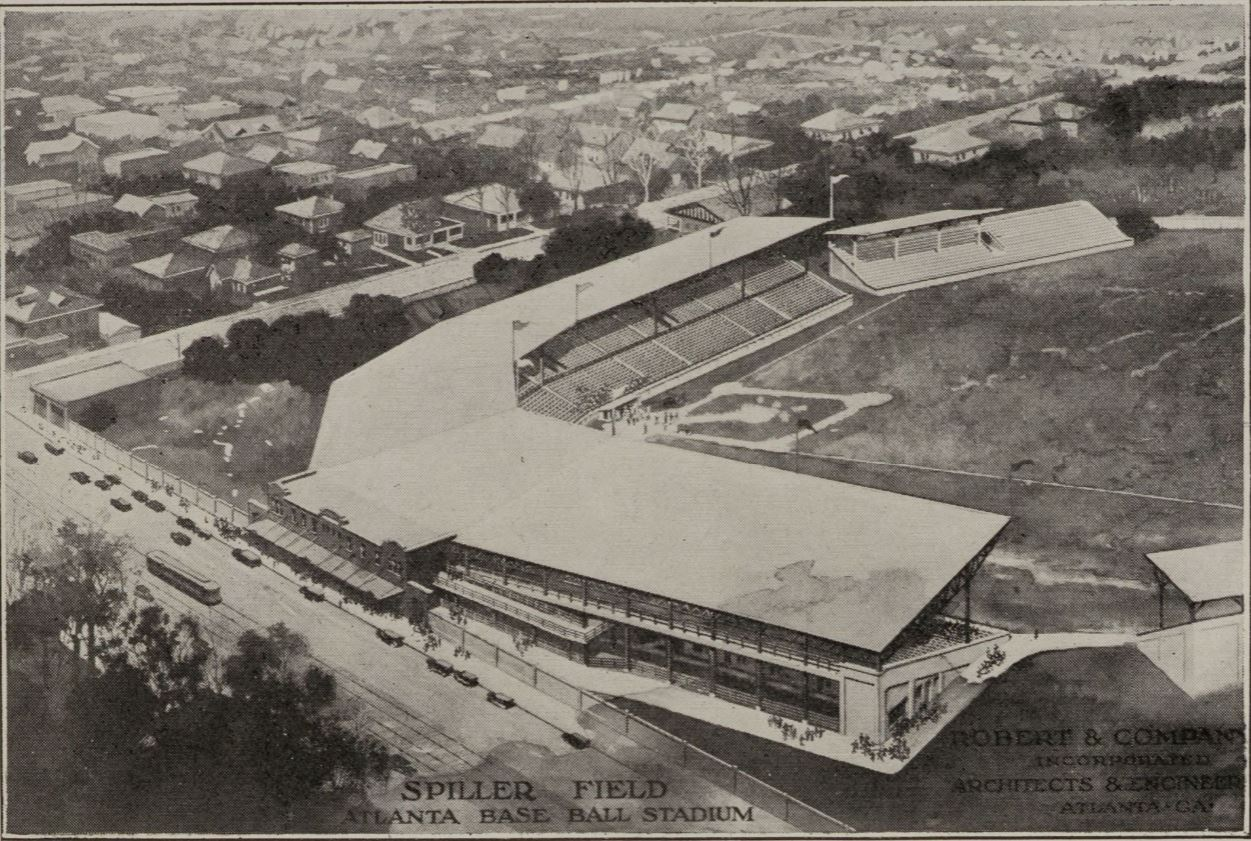
- Spiller Field in 1924
- Interactive map of Ponce de Leon Park
- Former names: Spiller Field (1924–1933)
- Address: Atlanta, Georgia; United States
- Coordinates: 33°46′29.94″N 84°21′54.87″W
- Owner: Georgia Railway and Electric
- Capacity: 6,800
- Surface: Grass

Construction
- Groundbreaking: 1907
- Opened: May 23, 1907
- Closed: 1965
- Demolished: 1966
- Cost: $60,000

Ponce de Leon Park (/ˌpɒns də ˈliːən/ PONSS də LEE-ən; also known as Spiller Park or Spiller Field from 1924 to 1932, and "Poncey" to locals, was the primary home field for the minor league baseball team called the Atlanta Crackers for nearly six decades. The Crackers played here in the Southern Association (1907–1959) and the International League (1962–64). It was also home of the Atlanta Black Crackers who captured the second half championship of the Negro American League in 1938.

The ballpark was located at 650 Ponce de Leon Avenue; the street ran along the south side of the park i.e. along its first base side. Behind right and center field, atop the slope bordering the park on the East, were the tracks of the Southern Railway, now part of the BeltLine, a trail and future transit ring around the central neighborhoods of Atlanta. Across the street was the Ponce de Leon Amusement Park until 1926, when the hulking Sears Roebuck Southeastern Headquarters, now known as Ponce City Market, was built.

== History ==
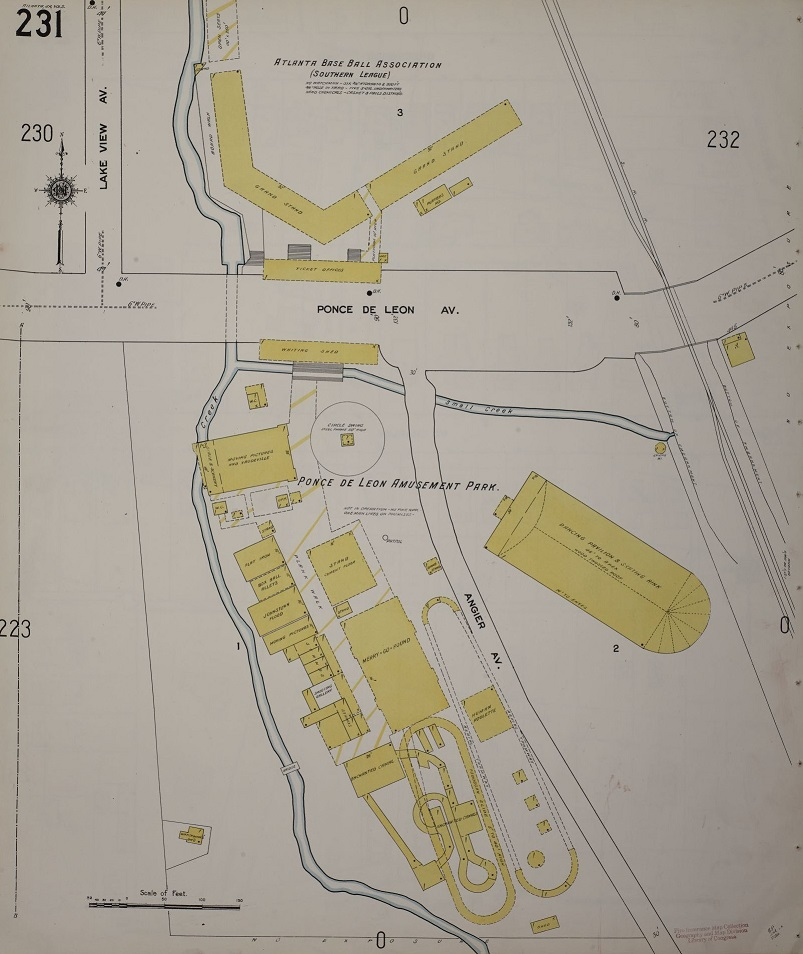
Ponce de Leon Park in 1911

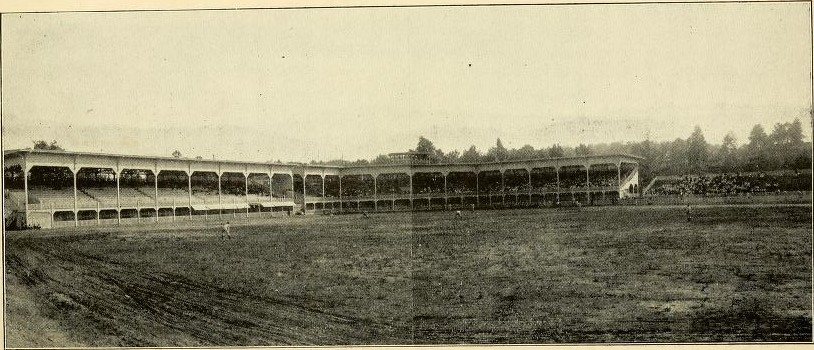
The ballpark in 1907

The original Ponce de Leon Park ballpark opened on the site in 1907. The structure was destroyed by fire on September 8, 1923. The ballpark was rebuilt in 1924 and named for club owner Rell J. Spiller. It reverted to the name Ponce de Leon Park in 1933, after Spiller had sold the ball club.

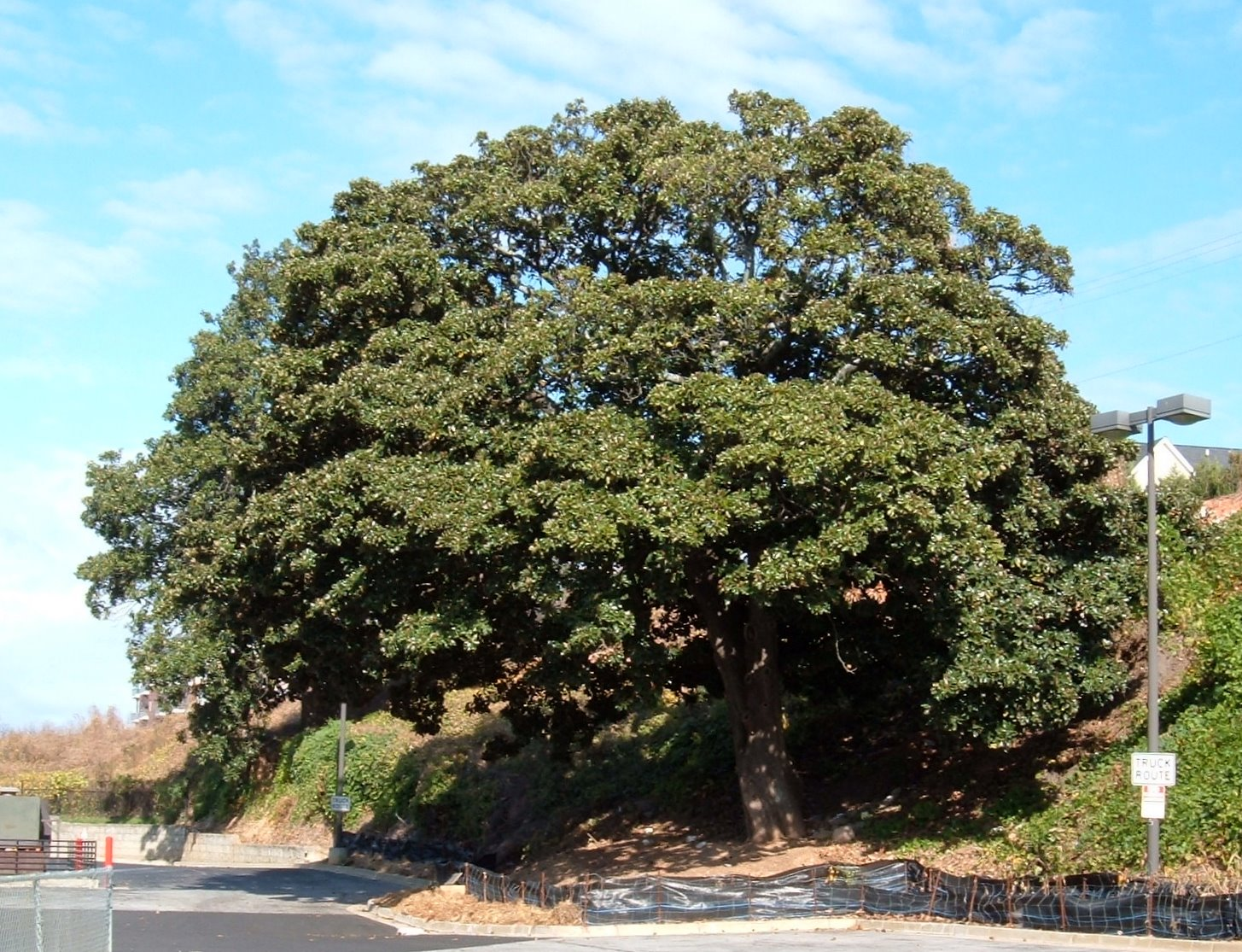
Magnolia tree at shopping center

Ponce de Leon was known for a magnolia tree in deep center field. Balls landing in the tree remained in play until Earl Mann took over the team in 1947 and moved the outfield wall in 50 feet. Both Babe Ruth and Eddie Mathews hit home runs that became stuck in the distant tree. Willie Mays hit a 460-foot home run to centerfield during an exhibition game that was part of the 1955 Mays-Newcombe All-Stars "barnstorming tour".

The seating capacity of the park was about 20,000. On April 7, 1946, 21,006 fans saw the New York Yankees defeat the Crackers in a preseason exhibition. This was the largest baseball crowd to date in the city's history.

The first integrated crowd of White European-Americans and Black and brown African-Americans at a professional sporting event in Atlanta took place at Ponce de Leon Park on April 8, 1962, for the preseason exhibition game between the Philadelphia Phillies and St. Louis Cardinals. The desegregation of public sporting events would enable the location of major league sports franchises in Atlanta beginning in 1966.

After the Crackers moved to Atlanta Stadium in 1965, Ponce de Leon Park was demolished in favor of a shopping center (now also demolished) and today a strip mall, Midtown Place, occupies the location. The famous magnolia tree is still standing at the rear of the shopping center along the BeltLine trail.

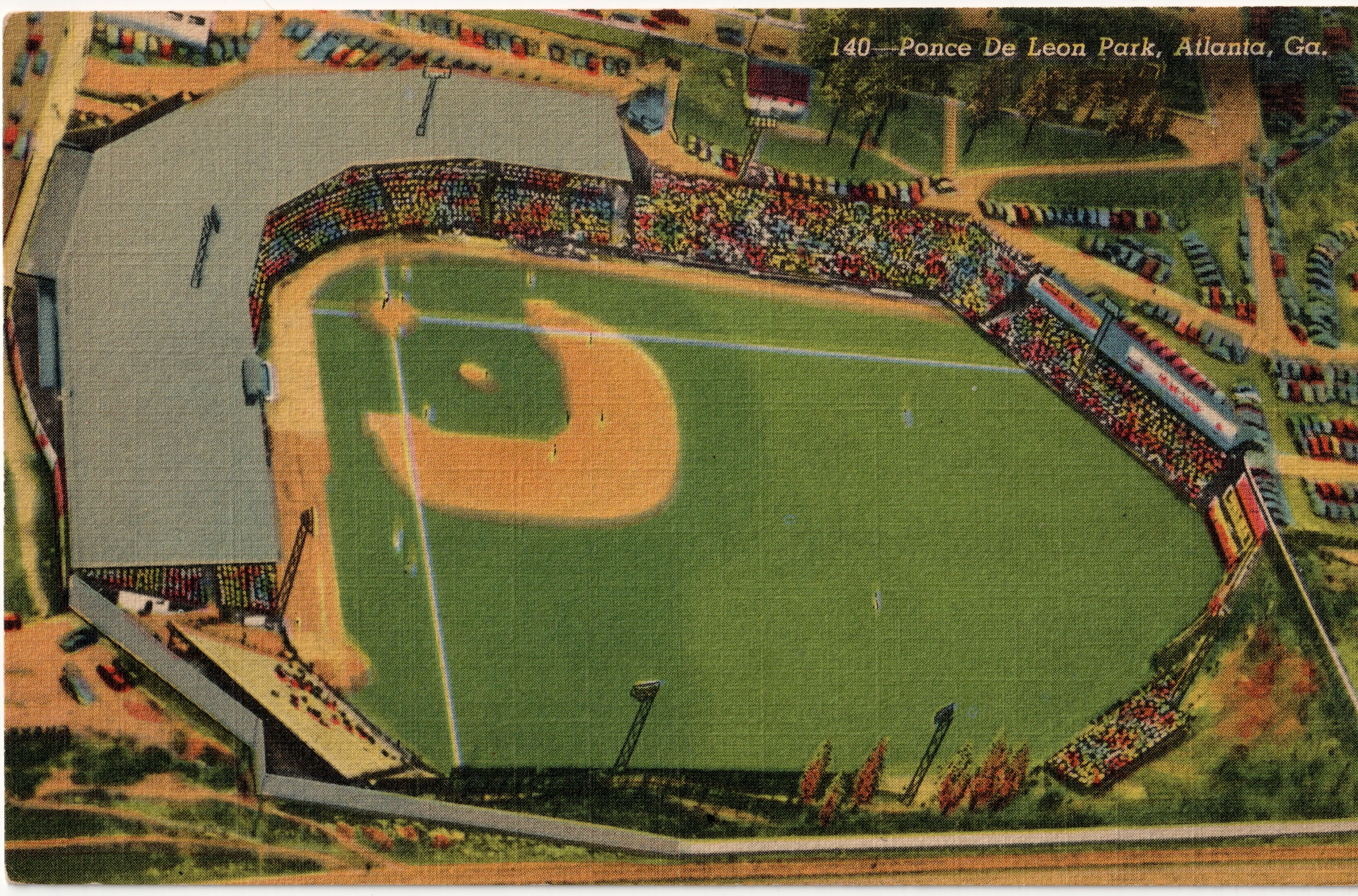
Ponce De Leon Park, Atlanta, Ga in the 1940s

== Other events ==
College football games were once hosted at Ponce de Leon Park. The Georgia Tech Yellow Jackets played all their home games there from 1908 to 1911. The Georgia Bulldogs have also played games at 'Poncey.'

On July 1, 1940, the park hosted an exhibition fight between a 45-year-old Jack Dempsey and wrestler Clarence (Cowboy) Luttrell which Dempsey won.

The park also hosted regular Friday night high school football games between Tech High Smithies and Boys' High Purple Hurricanes during the 1940s which sometimes outdrew the college games.
