= List of Ohio Athletic Conference football standings (1902–1936) =

This is a list of yearly Ohio Athletic Conference football standings.

== Ohio Athletic Conference football standings ==
=== 1902–1936 era ===
1902 Ohio Athletic Conference football standings
	Conf.					Overall
Team	W		L		T	W		L		T
Case $	5	–	0	–	0	6	–	3	–	0
Ohio State	2	–	1	–	0	6	–	2	–	2
Ohio Wesleyan	2	–	2	–	0	7	–	3	–	0
Oberlin	1	–	2	–	0	4	–	4	–	0
Kenyon	1	–	3	–	0	2	–	4	–	2
Western Reserve	0	–	3	–	0	3	–	6	–	0
$ – Conference champion

1903 Ohio Athletic Conference football standings
	Conf.					Overall
Team	W		L		T	W		L		T
Case $	5	–	0	–	0	8	–	2	–	0
Ohio State	3	–	1	–	0	8	–	3	–	0
Oberlin	2	–	2	–	1	4	–	4	–	1
Ohio Wesleyan	2	–	3	–	0	5	–	4	–	0
Western Reserve	1	–	3	–	0	3	–	6	–	0
Kenyon	0	–	4	–	1	2	–	6	–	1
$ – Conference champion

1904 Ohio Athletic Conference football standings
	Conf.					Overall
Team	W		L		T	W		L		T
Case $	4	–	1	–	0	7	–	2	–	0
Ohio State	2	–	1	–	0	6	–	5	–	0
Oberlin	2	–	2	–	1	4	–	2	–	1
Western Reserve	1	–	1	–	1	4	–	2	–	3
Ohio Wesleyan	2	–	2	–	0	5	–	5	–	0
Kenyon	0	–	4	–	0	3	–	5	–	1
$ – Conference champion

1905 Ohio Athletic Conference football standings
	Conf.					Overall
Team	W		L		T	W		L		T
Case $	4	–	0	–	1	8	–	1	–	1
Ohio State	2	–	0	–	1	8	–	2	–	2
Oberlin	2	–	3	–	0	3	–	6	–	0
Western Reserve	1	–	2	–	0	6	–	3	–	0
Kenyon	1	–	3	–	0	5	–	5	–	0
Ohio Wesleyan	1	–	3	–	0	4	–	6	–	0
$ – Conference champion

1906 Ohio Athletic Conference football standings
	Conf.					Overall
Team	W		L		T	W		L		T
Ohio State $	3	–	0	–	0	8	–	1	–	0
Western Reserve	1	–	1	–	1	4	–	2	–	2
Ohio Wesleyan	1	–	1	–	2	3	–	3	–	3
Oberlin	1	–	1	–	3	1	–	3	–	3
Case	2	–	3	–	0	4	–	5	–	1
Kenyon	0	–	2	–	2	1	–	4	–	2
$ – Conference champion

1907 Ohio Athletic Conference football standings
	Conf.					Overall
Team	W		L		T	W		L		T
Western Reserve $	5	–	1	–	0	8	–	1	–	0
Ohio State	5	–	1	–	1	7	–	2	–	1
Oberlin	3	–	1	–	0	6	–	2	–	0
Case	5	–	2	–	0	6	–	3	–	0
Kenyon	3	–	4	–	0	4	–	4	–	0
Ohio Wesleyan	2	–	3	–	0	7	–	3	–	0
Wooster	1	–	4	–	1	2	–	4	–	1
Denison	1	–	5	–	0	3	–	5	–	0
Heidelberg	0	–	4	–	0	2	–	4	–	0
$ – Conference champion

1908 Ohio Athletic Conference football standings
	Conf.					Overall
Team	W		L		T	W		L		T
Western Reserve $	6	–	1	–	0	9	–	1	–	0
Kenyon	3	–	1	–	1	7	–	1	–	1
Ohio State	4	–	3	–	0	6	–	4	–	0
Case	4	–	2	–	1	6	–	3	–	1
Oberlin	2	–	2	–	0	3	–	4	–	0
Denison	2	–	3	–	0	5	–	5	–	0
Ohio Wesleyan	2	–	3	–	0	4	–	4	–	0
Wooster	1	–	5	–	0	3	–	5	–	0
Heidelberg	0	–	4	–	0	1	–	6	–	0
$ – Conference champion

1909 Ohio Athletic Conference football standings
	Conf.					Overall
Team	W		L		T	W		L		T
Oberlin $	4	–	0	–	1	5	–	1	–	1
Case	5	–	0	–	2	6	–	1	–	2
Ohio State	5	–	2	–	0	7	–	3	–	0
Western Reserve	2	–	1	–	1	5	–	3	–	1
Kenyon	4	–	4	–	0	6	–	4	–	0
Denison	3	–	3	–	0	4	–	5	–	1
Ohio Wesleyan	2	–	4	–	0	5	–	4	–	0
Wittenberg	1	–	3	–	0	3	–	6	–	0
Wooster	1	–	5	–	0	1	–	6	–	0
Heidelberg	0	–	5	–	0	0	–	8	–	1
$ – Conference champion

1910 Ohio Athletic Conference football standings
	Conf.					Overall
Team	W		L		T	W		L		T
Oberlin $	3	–	0	–	1	5	–	1	–	2
Case	5	–	1	–	0	6	–	1	–	1
Ohio State	5	–	1	–	2	5	–	1	–	3
Cincinnati	3	–	1	–	0	5	–	3	–	0
Western Reserve	4	–	3	–	0	5	–	4	–	0
Ohio Wesleyan	3	–	3	–	0	6	–	3	–	0
Miami (OH)	1	–	1	–	0	2	–	4	–	1
Denison	3	–	4	–	2	3	–	4	–	2
Wooster	1	–	4	–	1	1	–	6	–	1
Kenyon	1	–	5	–	0	1	–	6	–	1
Wittenberg	0	–	5	–	0	2	–	7	–	0
Ohio	0	–	1	–	0	0	–	6	–	1
$ – Conference champion

1911 Ohio Athletic Conference football standings
	Conf.					Overall
Team	W		L		T	W		L		T
Oberlin $	4	–	0	–	1	6	–	1	–	1
Case	5	–	1	–	1	5	–	2	–	1
Ohio Wesleyan	6	–	2	–	0	6	–	3	–	0
Ohio State	4	–	1	–	2	5	–	3	–	2
Cincinnati	2	–	1	–	1	6	–	2	–	1
Denison	3	–	2	–	2	6	–	2	–	2
Western Reserve	1	–	3	–	2	4	–	3	–	4
Ohio	1	–	2	–	0	3	–	3	–	2
Miami (OH)	1	–	3	–	1	2	–	4	–	2
Wittenberg	1	–	4	–	0	3	–	6	–	0
Kenyon	0	–	6	–	0	1	–	7	–	1
Wooster	0	–	4	–	0	0	–	6	–	0
$ – Conference champion

1912 Ohio Athletic Conference football standings
	Conf.					Overall
Team	W		L		T	W		L		T
Ohio State $	5	–	0	–	0	6	–	3	–	0
Oberlin	5	–	1	–	0	7	–	1	–	0
Western Reserve	4	–	1	–	0	5	–	4	–	0
Denison	4	–	1	–	1	6	–	1	–	1
Miami (OH)	1	–	1	–	2	3	–	3	–	2
Case	3	–	3	–	0	4	–	5	–	0
Wittenberg	2	–	3	–	1	6	–	3	–	1
Kenyon	2	–	3	–	1	4	–	3	–	1
Ohio Wesleyan	2	–	5	–	0	3	–	6	–	0
Wooster	1	–	4	–	1	1	–	4	–	1
Cincinnati	0	–	3	–	1	3	–	4	–	1
Ohio	0	–	4	–	1	1	–	7	–	1
$ – Conference champion

1913 Ohio Athletic Conference football standings
	Conf.					Overall
Team	W		L		T	W		L		T
Oberlin $	5	–	0	–	1	6	–	1	–	1
Ohio State	3	–	0	–	1	4	–	2	–	1
Denison	4	–	1	–	0	5	–	2	–	0
Miami (OH)	4	–	2	–	0	6	–	2	–	0
Cincinnati	4	–	2	–	1	5	–	3	–	1
Western Reserve	3	–	2	–	1	4	–	4	–	1
Case	3	–	3	–	0	4	–	5	–	0
Kenyon	1	–	3	–	1	5	–	3	–	1
Wooster	1	–	3	–	1	2	–	3	–	2
Ohio	1	–	3	–	0	2	–	5	–	1
Ohio Wesleyan	1	–	6	–	0	2	–	7	–	0
Wittenberg	0	–	5	–	0	3	–	7	–	0
$ – Conference champion

1914 Ohio Athletic Conference football standings
	Conf.					Overall
Team	W		L		T	W		L		T
Denison $	5	–	1	–	0	7	–	1	–	0
Mount Union	4	–	1	–	0	6	–	4	–	0
Cincinnati	4	–	2	–	0	6	–	3	–	0
Miami (OH)	4	–	2	–	0	5	–	3	–	0
Ohio	3	–	3	–	0	4	–	4	–	0
Oberlin	3	–	4	–	0	4	–	4	–	0
Case	3	–	4	–	0	4	–	6	–	0
Kenyon	2	–	3	–	0	4	–	3	–	1
Western Reserve	2	–	4	–	0	4	–	6	–	0
Wooster	2	–	5	–	0	2	–	6	–	0
Ohio Wesleyan	2	–	6	–	0	3	–	7	–	0
Wittenberg	0	–	3	–	0	3	–	6	–	0
Ohio State *	3	–	0	–	0	5	–	2	–	0
$ – Conference champion; * – did not complete for championship

1915 Ohio Athletic Conference football standings
	Conf.					Overall
Team	W		L		T	W		L		T
Western Reserve $	6	–	1	–	0	7	–	2	–	0
Miami (OH)	5	–	1	–	0	6	–	2	–	0
Denison	5	–	2	–	0	6	–	2	–	0
Ohio	2	–	1	–	0	8	–	1	–	0
Wooster	3	–	1	–	2	3	–	3	–	2
Case	4	–	2	–	1	5	–	5	–	1
Oberlin	3	–	3	–	0	4	–	4	–	0
Cincinnati	3	–	4	–	0	5	–	4	–	0
Ohio Wesleyan	3	–	3	–	0	4	–	5	–	0
Kenyon	1	–	6	–	0	3	–	6	–	0
Akron	1	–	6	–	0	1	–	7	–	1
Wittenberg	0	–	4	–	1	3	–	5	–	1
Mount Union	0	–	5	–	0	3	–	7	–	0
Baldwin–Wallace	0	–	0	–	0	0	–	0	–	0
Ohio State *	3	–	0	–	0	5	–	1	–	1
$ – Conference champion; * – did not complete for championship

1916 Ohio Athletic Conference football standings
	Conf.					Overall
Team	W		L		T	W		L		T
Miami (OH) $	6	–	0	–	1	7	–	0	–	1
Mount Union	6	–	1	–	0	8	–	2	–	0
Denison	5	–	0	–	2	5	–	1	–	2
Ohio	4	–	1	–	1	5	–	2	–	1
Wooster	5	–	2	–	0	6	–	2	–	0
Case	4	–	3	–	0	5	–	5	–	0
Ohio Wesleyan	2	–	2	–	2	2	–	3	–	2
Western Reserve	3	–	4	–	0	3	–	7	–	0
Akron	2	–	4	–	0	2	–	7	–	0
Ohio Northern	2	–	5	–	0	3	–	7	–	0
Kenyon	2	–	5	–	0	2	–	7	–	0
Wittenberg	0	–	5	–	1	2	–	5	–	2
Cincinnati	0	–	6	–	1	0	–	8	–	2
Baldwin–Wallace	0	–	1	–	0	0	–	2	–	0
Oberlin	0	–	5	–	0	0	–	7	–	0
Ohio State *	3	–	0	–	0	7	–	0	–	0
$ – Conference champion; * – did not complete for championship

1917 Ohio Athletic Conference football standings
	Conf.					Overall
Team	W		L		T	W		L		T
Miami (OH) $	5	–	0	–	1	6	–	0	–	2
Wooster	5	–	0	–	3	6	–	0	–	3
Wittenberg	4	–	1	–	0	5	–	2	–	0
Oberlin	4	–	1	–	0	5	–	2	–	1
Akron	3	–	1	–	0	5	–	3	–	0
Denison	2	–	2	–	0	5	–	3	–	0
Ohio Wesleyan	3	–	3	–	1	4	–	3	–	1
Western Reserve	3	–	3	–	1	3	–	5	–	1
Ohio	3	–	3	–	0	3	–	5	–	0
Case	3	–	4	–	1	3	–	6	–	1
Kenyon	2	–	3	–	1	3	–	3	–	1
Mount Union	1	–	5	–	0	2	–	6	–	0
Ohio Northern	0	–	4	–	0	3	–	4	–	0
Baldwin–Wallace	0	–	7	–	0	1	–	8	–	0
Cincinnati	0	–	4	–	0	0	–	6	–	0
Ohio State *	3	–	0	–	0	8	–	0	–	1
$ – Conference champion; * – did not complete for championship

1918 Ohio Athletic Conference football standings
	Conf.					Overall
Team	W		L		T	W		L		T
Wittenberg $	3	–	0	–	0	4	–	0	–	0
Miami (OH)	4	–	0	–	1	5	–	0	–	1
Mount Union	5	–	1	–	0	6	–	1	–	0
Wooster	5	–	1	–	0	6	–	1	–	0
Western Reserve	5	–	1	–	0	5	–	2	–	0
Ohio	1	–	0	–	1	4	–	0	–	1
Cincinnati	0	–	0	–	2	3	–	0	–	2
Ohio Wesleyan	2	–	2	–	0	3	–	2	–	0
Case	2	–	3	–	2	3	–	5	–	2
Akron	1	–	2	–	1	2	–	2	–	1
Oberlin	1	–	4	–	0	1	–	4	–	0
Baldwin–Wallace	0	–	4	–	1	5	–	4	–	1
Kenyon	0	–	4	–	0	1	–	4	–	0
Ohio Northern	0	–	5	–	0	1	–	5	–	0
Denison	0	–	5	–	0	1	–	6	–	0
Ohio State *	3	–	0	–	0	3	–	3	–	0
$ – Conference champion; * – did not complete for championship

1919 Ohio Athletic Conference football standings
	Conf.					Overall
Team	W		L		T	W		L		T
Wooster $	7	–	0	–	0	8	–	0	–	0
Oberlin	5	–	0	–	0	7	–	1	–	0
Ohio State	2	–	0	–	0	6	–	1	–	0
Miami (OH)	7	–	1	–	0	7	–	1	–	0
Wittenberg	3	–	0	–	2	6	–	0	–	2
Akron	5	–	1	–	1	6	–	1	–	1
Denison	4	–	2	–	1	6	–	2	–	1
Western Reserve	3	–	3	–	0	5	–	4	–	0
Ohio Wesleyan	3	–	3	–	0	4	–	4	–	0
Case	2	–	4	–	1	3	–	6	–	1
Ohio	2	–	4	–	0	3	–	5	–	0
Cincinnati	1	–	3	–	1	3	–	4	–	1
Mount Union	0	–	5	–	0	1	–	7	–	0
Ohio Northern	0	–	6	–	0	1	–	8	–	0
Baldwin–Wallace	0	–	5	–	0	0	–	8	–	0
Kenyon	0	–	7	–	0	0	–	7	–	0
$ – Conference champion

1920 Ohio Athletic Conference football standings
	Conf.					Overall
Team	W		L		T	W		L		T
Wooster $	7	–	0	–	0	9	–	0	–	0
Wittenberg	5	–	0	–	0	8	–	0	–	0
Ohio State	2	–	0	–	0	7	–	1	–	0
Denison	5	–	1	–	1	6	–	1	–	1
Oberlin	5	–	2	–	0	5	–	2	–	0
Heidelberg	3	–	2	–	0	7	–	2	–	0
Cincinnati	3	–	2	–	0	4	–	5	–	0
Miami (OH)	3	–	2	–	1	5	–	2	–	1
Mount Union	3	–	3	–	0	6	–	3	–	0
Ohio Wesleyan	3	–	3	–	0	4	–	3	–	0
Ohio Northern	2	–	3	–	0	3	–	4	–	0
Akron	2	–	4	–	0	4	–	4	–	0
Case	2	–	5	–	1	2	–	8	–	1
Ohio	1	–	3	–	0	4	–	3	–	0
Kenyon	1	–	6	–	1	2	–	5	–	1
Western Reserve	1	–	6	–	0	2	–	8	–	0
Hiram	0	–	6	–	0	0	–	9	–	0
$ – Conference champion

1921 Ohio Athletic Conference football standings
	Conf.					Overall
Team	W		L		T	W		L		T
Miami (OH) $	7	–	0	–	0	8	–	0	–	0
St. Xavier	1	–	0	–	0	6	–	2	–	0
Oberlin	7	–	0	–	1	7	–	0	–	1
Case	6	–	1	–	2	6	–	2	–	2
Wooster	6	–	2	–	0	6	–	2	–	0
Denison	5	–	2	–	0	5	–	3	–	0
Akron	4	–	3	–	0	5	–	3	–	0
Ohio Northern	4	–	3	–	0	5	–	4	–	0
Ohio State	1	–	1	–	0	5	–	2	–	0
Wittenberg	3	–	3	–	2	4	–	3	–	2
Kenyon	1	–	1	–	4	1	–	1	–	5
Ohio	1	–	1	–	0	4	–	4	–	1
Otterbein	1	–	3	–	2	1	–	5	–	2
Western Reserve	2	–	5	–	1	2	–	7	–	1
Hiram	1	–	4	–	2	2	–	4	–	2
Ohio Wesleyan	1	–	6	–	1	1	–	6	–	1
Mount Union	0	–	5	–	1	1	–	6	–	1
Cincinnati	0	–	4	–	0	3	–	6	–	0
Heidelberg	0	–	7	–	0	0	–	7	–	1
$ – Conference champion

1922 Ohio Athletic Conference football standings
	Conf.					Overall
Team	W		L		T	W		L		T
Ohio Wesleyan $	7	–	0	–	0	8	–	1	–	0
Oberlin	5	–	0	–	0	6	–	1	–	0
St. Xavier	2	–	0	–	0	7	–	2	–	0
Wooster	7	–	1	–	0	8	–	1	–	0
Ohio	3	–	1	–	0	5	–	3	–	0
Mount Union	5	–	2	–	0	6	–	2	–	1
Wittenberg	5	–	2	–	1	6	–	2	–	1
Akron	5	–	3	–	0	5	–	3	–	0
Denison	4	–	3	–	0	6	–	3	–	0
Miami (OH)	4	–	3	–	0	4	–	3	–	1
Kenyon	2	–	4	–	0	3	–	5	–	0
Western Reserve	3	–	6	–	0	3	–	7	–	0
Cincinnati	1	–	3	–	1	1	–	7	–	1
Ohio Northern	2	–	5	–	0	4	–	5	–	0
Otterbein	2	–	6	–	0	2	–	6	–	0
Case	2	–	7	–	0	2	–	8	–	0
Muskingum	1	–	4	–	0	4	–	5	–	0
Hiram	1	–	6	–	0	2	–	7	–	0
Heidelberg	1	–	6	–	0	1	–	7	–	0
$ – Conference champion

1923 Ohio Athletic Conference football standings
	Conf.					Overall
Team	W		L		T	W		L		T
Wooster $	8	–	0	–	0	9	–	0	–	0
Ohio Wesleyan	5	–	0	–	0	6	–	2	–	0
Wittenberg	5	–	1	–	0	7	–	1	–	0
Hiram	5	–	2	–	0	5	–	2	–	0
Cincinnati	5	–	2	–	0	6	–	3	–	0
Otterbein	4	–	3	–	0	5	–	3	–	0
Western Reserve	5	–	4	–	0	5	–	4	–	0
Muskingum	3	–	3	–	0	5	–	3	–	0
Oberlin	3	–	3	–	1	4	–	3	–	1
Mount Union	3	–	3	–	0	5	–	4	–	0
Denison	2	–	2	–	2	3	–	3	–	2
Ohio Northern	3	–	4	–	0	6	–	4	–	0
Akron	2	–	3	–	1	4	–	3	–	1
Ohio	2	–	4	–	1	3	–	5	–	1
St. Xavier	1	–	2	–	0	4	–	4	–	0
Miami (OH)	1	–	4	–	1	3	–	4	–	1
Kenyon	1	–	5	–	0	1	–	6	–	0
Heidelberg	0	–	5	–	0	3	–	5	–	0
Case	0	–	8	–	0	0	–	9	–	0
$ – Conference champion

1924 Ohio Athletic Conference football standings
	Conf.					Overall
Team	W		L		T	W		L		T
Oberlin $	8	–	0	–	0	8	–	0	–	0
Wittenberg	6	–	1	–	0	7	–	1	–	0
Ohio Wesleyan	4	–	1	–	0	7	–	2	–	0
Case	6	–	2	–	1	6	–	2	–	1
Wooster	5	–	2	–	1	6	–	2	–	2
Akron	3	–	2	–	0	5	–	3	–	0
Western Reserve	3	–	2	–	2	5	–	2	–	2
Heidelberg	3	–	2	–	2	3	–	3	–	2
Mount Union	4	–	3	–	1	5	–	4	–	1
Ohio Northern	3	–	3	–	1	4	–	3	–	1
St. Xavier	1	–	1	–	1	2	–	5	–	1
Kenyon	3	–	4	–	1	4	–	4	–	1
Denison	3	–	4	–	0	3	–	4	–	1
Ohio	2	–	4	–	0	4	–	4	–	0
Otterbein	2	–	5	–	0	2	–	5	–	0
Muskingum	2	–	5	–	0	2	–	6	–	0
Cincinnati	1	–	4	–	0	2	–	6	–	1
Baldwin–Wallace	1	–	4	–	0	1	–	7	–	0
Miami (OH)	1	–	5	–	0	2	–	6	–	0
Hiram	0	–	7	–	0	1	–	7	–	0
$ – Conference champion

1925 Ohio Athletic Conference football standings
	Conf.					Overall
Team	W		L		T	W		L		T
Ohio Wesleyan $	6	–	0	–	0	7	–	1	–	1
Oberlin	5	–	0	–	1	7	–	0	–	1
Wooster	5	–	1	–	0	6	–	2	–	0
Kenyon	5	–	2	–	0	6	–	2	–	0
St. Xavier	3	–	1	–	1	5	–	2	–	1
Mount Union	4	–	2	–	1	7	–	2	–	1
Baldwin–Wallace	5	–	3	–	0	5	–	3	–	0
Ohio	3	–	2	–	0	6	–	2	–	0
Miami (OH)	3	–	2	–	0	5	–	3	–	0
Muskingum	3	–	3	–	0	4	–	3	–	1
Case	3	–	4	–	2	3	–	4	–	2
Denison	3	–	4	–	0	4	–	4	–	1
Heidelberg	3	–	4	–	0	4	–	4	–	0
Cincinnati	2	–	3	–	0	4	–	5	–	0
Wittenberg	3	–	5	–	1	3	–	5	–	1
Ohio Northern	2	–	4	–	1	3	–	4	–	1
Western Reserve	2	–	5	–	0	3	–	6	–	0
Hiram	0	–	5	–	2	0	–	5	–	3
Akron	1	–	6	–	0	1	–	7	–	0
Otterbein	0	–	5	–	1	0	–	6	–	2
$ – Conference champion

1926 Ohio Athletic Conference football standings
	Conf.					Overall
Team	W		L		T	W		L		T
Muskingum $	7	–	0	–	0	9	–	0	–	0
Dayton	3	–	0	–	0	8	–	2	–	0
St. Xavier	1	–	0	–	0	9	–	1	–	0
Oberlin	6	–	1	–	0	6	–	1	–	0
Wittenberg	4	–	1	–	0	6	–	2	–	0
Ohio Wesleyan	5	–	1	–	1	6	–	2	–	1
Wooster	5	–	2	–	0	6	–	2	–	0
Miami (OH)	4	–	2	–	1	5	–	2	–	1
Ohio	4	–	2	–	1	5	–	2	–	1
Akron	4	–	2	–	2	5	–	2	–	2
Mount Union	5	–	3	–	0	6	–	3	–	0
Case	4	–	2	–	3	4	–	2	–	3
Baldwin–Wallace	3	–	3	–	2	3	–	3	–	2
Western Reserve	3	–	4	–	1	3	–	4	–	1
Heidelberg	2	–	4	–	0	3	–	4	–	0
Cincinnati	2	–	5	–	1	3	–	5	–	1
Denison	2	–	6	–	0	2	–	6	–	1
Otterbein	1	–	5	–	0	2	–	5	–	0
Ohio Northern	1	–	6	–	0	1	–	6	–	0
Kenyon	1	–	6	–	0	1	–	7	–	0
Marietta	1	–	6	–	0	1	–	7	–	0
Hiram	0	–	7	–	0	0	–	7	–	0
$ – Conference champion

1927 Ohio Athletic Conference football standings
	Conf.					Overall
Team	W		L		T	W		L		T
Miami (OH) +	7	–	1	–	0	8	–	1	–	0
Muskingum +	7	–	1	–	0	8	–	1	–	0
Oberlin	6	–	1	–	1	6	–	1	–	1
Mount Union	6	–	1	–	1	6	–	2	–	1
Wittenberg	4	–	1	–	0	8	–	2	–	0
Wooster	5	–	2	–	0	6	–	2	–	0
Dayton	2	–	1	–	0	6	–	3	–	0
Ohio	3	–	1	–	2	4	–	2	–	2
Heidelberg	4	–	2	–	0	4	–	3	–	0
Akron	4	–	3	–	0	5	–	3	–	0
Ohio Wesleyan	2	–	2	–	1	4	–	3	–	2
Denison	3	–	4	–	0	3	–	5	–	0
Marietta	2	–	3	–	1	2	–	3	–	1
Otterbein	2	–	4	–	0	2	–	4	–	1
Ohio Northern	2	–	5	–	0	3	–	6	–	0
Western Reserve	2	–	5	–	0	2	–	6	–	0
Capital	1	–	3	–	0	3	–	4	–	0
Baldwin–Wallace	2	–	6	–	0	2	–	6	–	0
Case	2	–	6	–	0	2	–	6	–	0
Cincinnati	0	–	4	–	2	2	–	5	–	2
Kenyon	1	–	5	–	0	1	–	6	–	1
Hiram	0	–	7	–	0	0	–	7	–	0
St. Xavier *	1	–	0	–	0	8	–	1	–	1
+ – Conference co-champions; * – did not compete for championship

1928 Ohio Athletic Conference football standings
	Conf.					Overall
Team	W		L		T	W		L		T
Heidelberg $	6	–	0	–	1	6	–	0	–	1
Mount Union	4	–	2	–	0	4	–	5	–	0
Muskingum	4	–	2	–	1	4	–	4	–	1
Oberlin	3	–	2	–	1	4	–	3	–	1
Wooster	2	–	2	–	2	2	–	4	–	2
Akron	3	–	4	–	0	5	–	4	–	0
Hiram	3	–	4	–	0	4	–	4	–	0
Otterbein	3	–	4	–	0	3	–	5	–	0
Ohio Northern	2	–	3	–	0	2	–	6	–	1
Case	1	–	4	–	1	2	–	6	–	1
Capital	1	–	5	–	0	1	–	6	–	1
St. Xavier	0	–	1	–	0	7	–	2	–	0
Baldwin–Wallace	0	–	8	–	0	0	–	8	–	0
Kenyon	0	–	5	–	0	0	–	7	–	0
Western Reserve *	8	–	0	–	0	8	–	0	–	0
Marietta *	4	–	0	–	0	4	–	2	–	1
Dayton *	2	–	0	–	0	6	–	3	–	0
$ – Conference champion; * – did not compete for championship

1929 Ohio Athletic Conference football standings
	Conf.					Overall
Team	W		L		T	W		L		T
Muskingum $	5	–	0	–	0	6	–	2	–	0
Heidelberg	2	–	0	–	0	4	–	3	–	0
Dayton	1	–	0	–	0	4	–	5	–	0
Akron	7	–	1	–	0	9	–	1	–	0
Baldwin–Wallace	4	–	1	–	1	6	–	1	–	1
Wooster	5	–	2	–	1	5	–	2	–	1
Mount Union	4	–	2	–	1	5	–	3	–	1
Oberlin	3	–	2	–	0	4	–	4	–	0
Western Reserve	3	–	2	–	0	3	–	6	–	0
Marietta	2	–	2	–	0	3	–	5	–	0
Kenyon	2	–	3	–	0	3	–	6	–	0
Otterbein	3	–	5	–	0	3	–	5	–	0
Case	1	–	6	–	0	2	–	7	–	0
Hiram	1	–	6	–	0	1	–	7	–	0
Ohio Northern	0	–	4	–	1	2	–	6	–	1
St. Xavier	0	–	2	–	0	6	–	4	–	0
Capital	0	–	5	–	0	0	–	5	–	2
$ – Conference champion

1930 Ohio Athletic Conference football standings
	Conf.					Overall
Team	W		L		T	W		L		T
Muskingum $	3	–	0	–	1	6	–	1	–	1
Akron	5	–	1	–	0	7	–	1	–	0
Wooster	4	–	1	–	1	5	–	3	–	1
Xavier	2	–	1	–	0	6	–	4	–	0
Otterbein	3	–	2	–	0	4	–	3	–	1
Case	3	–	3	–	0	5	–	4	–	0
Mount Union	3	–	3	–	0	4	–	5	–	1
Marietta	2	–	2	–	0	3	–	5	–	0
Oberlin	2	–	4	–	0	2	–	6	–	0
Western Reserve	1	–	3	–	0	1	–	7	–	0
Ohio Northern	1	–	4	–	0	3	–	5	–	0
Baldwin–Wallace	1	–	5	–	0	1	–	6	–	0
Kenyon	0	–	4	–	1	1	–	6	–	1
Hiram	0	–	5	–	0	0	–	8	–	0
Heidelberg *	2	–	0	–	0	8	–	0	–	0
Dayton *	2	–	0	–	0	4	–	3	–	2
Capital *	4	–	0	–	1	5	–	1	–	1
$ – Conference champion; * – did not compete for championship

1931 Ohio Athletic Conference football standings
	Conf.					Overall
Team	W		L		T	W		L		T
Muskingum $	4	–	0	–	0	8	–	0	–	0
Western Reserve	3	–	0	–	0	3	–	5	–	1
Baldwin–Wallace	4	–	0	–	1	5	–	0	–	3
Otterbein	5	–	1	–	0	5	–	3	–	0
Mount Union	4	–	1	–	0	7	–	2	–	1
Ohio Northern	3	–	1	–	0	6	–	2	–	0
Case	4	–	1	–	1	4	–	3	–	1
Xavier	1	–	0	–	1	4	–	3	–	1
Heidelberg	2	–	1	–	0	3	–	4	–	0
Dayton	0	–	0	–	1	5	–	3	–	2
Kenyon	3	–	3	–	0	4	–	3	–	0
Oberlin	2	–	3	–	0	3	–	4	–	1
Wooster	2	–	4	–	0	4	–	5	–	0
Ashland	2	–	6	–	0	2	–	6	–	0
Capital	1	–	4	–	0	1	–	5	–	1
Marietta	1	–	4	–	0	1	–	7	–	0
Akron	0	–	6	–	0	1	–	7	–	0
Hiram	0	–	6	–	0	0	–	8	–	0
$ – Conference champion

1932 Ohio Athletic Conference football standings
	Conf.					Overall
Team	W		L		T	W		L		T
Case $	6	–	0	–	0	7	–	2	–	0
Heidelberg	6	–	1	–	0	6	–	1	–	1
Baldwin–Wallace	5	–	1	–	1	6	–	1	–	1
Ohio Northern	3	–	1	–	0	4	–	2	–	1
Toledo	3	–	1	–	0	3	–	4	–	0
Wooster	4	–	1	–	2	5	–	1	–	2
Muskingum	3	–	1	–	1	4	–	3	–	1
Otterbein	4	–	2	–	2	4	–	2	–	2
Marietta	3	–	2	–	1	3	–	2	–	2
John Carroll	3	–	2	–	1	5	–	4	–	1
Dayton	1	–	1	–	0	9	–	2	–	0
Kenyon	2	–	2	–	0	2	–	3	–	1
Akron	1	–	4	–	3	2	–	4	–	3
Capital	1	–	4	–	2	1	–	4	–	2
Oberlin	1	–	3	–	0	2	–	6	–	0
Ashland	1	–	5	–	1	2	–	5	–	1
Hiram	1	–	6	–	0	1	–	6	–	1
Kent State	0	–	5	–	2	0	–	5	–	2
Mount Union	1	–	6	–	0	1	–	8	–	0
Xavier	0	–	1	–	0	3	–	4	–	1
$ – Conference champion

1933 Ohio Athletic Conference football standings
	Conf.					Overall
Team	W		L		T	W		L		T
Dayton $	2	–	0	–	1	8	–	2	–	1
Wooster	7	–	1	–	0	7	–	1	–	1
Akron	5	–	2	–	1	5	–	3	–	1
Case	4	–	2	–	0	5	–	3	–	1
Muskingum	4	–	2	–	1	5	–	2	–	1
Baldwin–Wallace	4	–	2	–	1	5	–	3	–	1
Toledo	3	–	2	–	1	5	–	2	–	1
John Carroll	3	–	2	–	2	5	–	2	–	2
Hiram	2	–	2	–	2	2	–	2	–	3
Kent State	2	–	2	–	3	2	–	2	–	3
Otterbein	3	–	3	–	1	3	–	4	–	1
Mount Union	3	–	4	–	0	3	–	5	–	1
Heidelberg	2	–	3	–	2	2	–	5	–	2
Marietta	2	–	3	–	1	3	–	3	–	1
Ashland	2	–	4	–	1	3	–	4	–	1
Bowling Green	1	–	3	–	2	2	–	3	–	2
Capital	1	–	4	–	2	1	–	4	–	2
Oberlin	1	–	3	–	0	4	–	4	–	0
Kenyon	0	–	4	–	1	1	–	5	–	1
Ohio Northern	0	–	4	–	1	0	–	5	–	2
Xavier *	1	–	0	–	0	5	–	4	–	0
$ – Conference champion; * – did not compete for championship

1934 Ohio Athletic Conference football standings
	Conf.					Overall
Team	W		L		T	W		L		T
Wooster $	8	–	0	–	0	8	–	1	–	0
Baldwin–Wallace	5	–	0	–	0	7	–	1	–	0
Ohio Northern	4	–	0	–	1	6	–	0	–	1
Toledo	4	–	1	–	0	5	–	3	–	0
Xavier	2	–	1	–	0	6	–	2	–	1
Muskingum	4	–	2	–	1	5	–	3	–	1
Mount Union	4	–	3	–	0	4	–	4	–	0
John Carroll	1	–	1	–	2	5	–	2	–	2
Dayton	0	–	0	–	1	4	–	3	–	1
Case	2	–	2	–	1	4	–	3	–	2
Kent State	2	–	3	–	3	2	–	3	–	3
Akron	3	–	4	–	0	3	–	4	–	1
Bowling Green	2	–	3	–	2	2	–	3	–	2
Marietta	1	–	2	–	2	2	–	3	–	2
Oberlin	1	–	2	–	1	2	–	5	–	1
Heidelberg	2	–	4	–	0	3	–	5	–	0
Otterbein	2	–	4	–	0	2	–	7	–	0
Capital	2	–	5	–	0	2	–	5	–	0
Hiram	2	–	5	–	0	2	–	5	–	0
Ashland	1	–	4	–	1	2	–	6	–	1
Kenyon	0	–	5	–	1	0	–	7	–	1
Findlay	0	–	1	–	0	3	–	3	–	0
$ – Conference champion

1935 Ohio Athletic Conference football standings
	Conf.					Overall
Team	W		L		T	W		L		T
Baldwin–Wallace $	8	–	0	–	0	9	–	1	–	0
Mount Union	6	–	1	–	1	7	–	1	–	1
Toledo	3	–	1	–	0	6	–	2	–	1
Capital	4	–	2	–	0	5	–	2	–	0
Akron	6	–	3	–	0	6	–	3	–	0
Marietta	3	–	2	–	0	4	–	4	–	0
Wittenberg	3	–	2	–	0	4	–	5	–	0
Case	3	–	2	–	0	3	–	6	–	0
Ohio Northern	3	–	2	–	1	4	–	3	–	1
Muskingum	3	–	3	–	0	5	–	4	–	0
Kenyon	1	–	1	–	1	3	–	3	–	1
Heidelberg	3	–	3	–	2	3	–	4	–	2
Oberlin	2	–	2	–	1	3	–	4	–	1
Wooster	2	–	3	–	2	3	–	4	–	2
Ashland	2	–	4	–	1	2	–	4	–	1
Kent State	2	–	5	–	0	3	–	5	–	0
Findlay	1	–	3	–	0	4	–	4	–	0
Otterbein	0	–	6	–	1	1	–	6	–	1
Bowling Green	0	–	6	–	0	1	–	6	–	0
John Carroll	0	–	4	–	0	1	–	8	–	0
$ – Conference champion

1936 Ohio Athletic Conference football standings
	Conf.					Overall
Team	W		L		T	W		L		T
Marietta $	4	–	0	–	0	5	–	2	–	0
Baldwin–Wallace	2	–	0	–	0	7	–	1	–	0
Muskingum	5	–	1	–	0	6	–	3	–	0
Case	4	–	1	–	0	5	–	4	–	0
Mount Union	3	–	1	–	0	7	–	1	–	1
Kent State	4	–	2	–	0	5	–	4	–	0
Toledo	2	–	1	–	0	2	–	6	–	0
Ohio Northern	4	–	2	–	1	4	–	2	–	2
Wittenberg	3	–	2	–	0	4	–	5	–	0
Capital	3	–	2	–	1	4	–	2	–	1
Bowling Green	2	–	1	–	3	4	–	2	–	3
Heidelberg	3	–	3	–	1	3	–	4	–	1
Wooster	3	–	4	–	0	3	–	6	–	0
Kenyon	1	–	3	–	0	3	–	4	–	0
Oberlin	1	–	3	–	0	3	–	5	–	0
Ashland	2	–	6	–	0	2	–	6	–	0
John Carroll	1	–	3	–	0	2	–	7	–	0
Otterbein	0	–	7	–	0	1	–	7	–	0
Findlay	0	–	5	–	0	0	–	7	–	0
$ – Conference champion
