= Harry Vaughan (American football) =

American football player and coach (1883–1951)

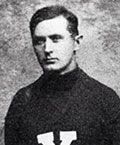

Biographical details
- Born: January 4, 1883; Pennsylvania, U.S.
- Died: September 6, 1951 (aged 68); Martinsburg, West Virginia, U.S.

Playing career
- 1909: Yale
- Position: End

Coaching career (HC unless noted)
- 1911: Ohio State
- 1915: Fordham

Head coaching record
- Overall: 9–7–2

Accomplishments and honors

Championships
- National (1909)

Henry F. Vaughan (January 4, 1883 – September 6, 1951) was an American college football player and coach. He served as the head coach at Ohio State University in 1911 and Fordham University in the 1915, compiling a career record of 9–7–2.

Vaughan was the tenth head coach of the Ohio State Buckeyes football team and served for a single season in 1911. On the recommendation of Ohio State's previous football coach, Howard Jones, the university's athletic board hired Vaughan, an All-American from Yale University. Vaughan resigned after leading Ohio State to a 5–3–2 record and returned to Yale for a law degree. In 1915, he became head coach at Fordham University, staying for only one season and tallying a record of 4–4.

He played college football at Yale and was selected as a second-team All-American end in 1909 by The New York Times.

He died in 1951 and was buried in Arlington National Cemetery.

== Head coaching record ==
Year	Team	Overall	Conference	Standing	Bowl/playoffs
Ohio State Buckeyes (Ohio Athletic Conference) (1911)
1911	Ohio State	5–3–2	4–1–2	4th	
Ohio State:		5–3–2	4–1–2		
Fordham Maroon (Independent) (1915)
1915	Fordham	4–4			
Fordham:		4–4			
Total:		9–7–2			
