= Paul N. MacEachron =

American football and basketball coach (1889–1930)

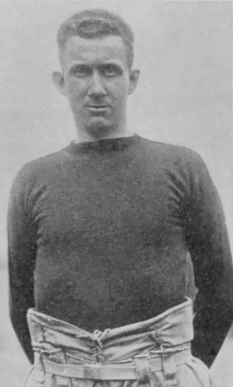

Biographical details
- Born: November 28, 1889; Franklin, Nebraska, U.S.
- Died: June 1, 1930 (aged 40); Oberlin, Ohio, U.S.

Playing career

Football
- 1911: Grinnell

Basketball
- c. 1911: Grinnell

Coaching career (HC unless noted)

Football
- 1922–1924: Grinnell (freshmen)
- 1925–1929: Oberlin

Basketball
- 1923–1924: Grinnell
- 1925–1930: Oberlin

Head coaching record
- Overall: 28–9–3 (football); 25–59 (basketball)

Paul Norton MacEachron (November 28, 1889 – June 1, 1930) was an American college football and college basketball coach. He served as the head football coach at Oberlin College from 1925 to 1929, compiling a record of 28–9–3. He was also the head basketball coach at Oberlin from 1925 to 1930, tallying a mark of 21–45. MacEachron died of a heart attack on June 1, 1930, at Chance Creek, in Oberlin, Ohio.

== Head coaching record ==
=== Football ===
Year	Team	Overall	Conference	Standing	Bowl/playoffs
Oberlin Congregationalists/Yeomen (Ohio Athletic Conference) (1925–1929)
1925	Oberlin	7–0–1	5–0–1	2nd	
1926	Oberlin	7–1	6–1	4th	
1927	Oberlin	6–1–1	6–1–1	T–3rd	
1928	Oberlin	4–3–1	3–2–1	5th	
1929	Oberlin	4–4	3–2	T–8th	
Oberlin:		28–9–3	23–6–3		
Total:		28–9–3			
