= 1927 Miami Redskins football team =

American college football season

1927 Miami Redskins football

OAC co-champion
- Conference: Buckeye Athletic Association, Ohio Athletic Conference
- Record: 8–1 (3–1 BAA, 7–1 OAC)
- Head coach: Chester Pittser (4th season)
- Home stadium: Miami Field

1927 Buckeye Athletic Association football standings
	Conf.					Overall
Team	W		L		T	W		L		T
Wittenberg $	4	–	0	–	0	8	–	2	–	0
Miami (OH)	3	–	1	–	0	8	–	1	–	0
Ohio	1	–	1	–	2	4	–	2	–	2
Ohio Wesleyan	1	–	2	–	1	4	–	3	–	2
Denison	1	–	3	–	0	3	–	5	–	0
Cincinnati	0	–	3	–	1	2	–	5	–	2
$ – Conference champion

1927 Ohio Athletic Conference football standings
	Conf.					Overall
Team	W		L		T	W		L		T
Miami (OH) +	7	–	1	–	0	8	–	1	–	0
Muskingum +	7	–	1	–	0	8	–	1	–	0
Oberlin	6	–	1	–	1	6	–	1	–	1
Mount Union	6	–	1	–	1	6	–	2	–	1
Wittenberg	4	–	1	–	0	8	–	2	–	0
Wooster	5	–	2	–	0	6	–	2	–	0
Dayton	2	–	1	–	0	6	–	3	–	0
Ohio	3	–	1	–	2	4	–	2	–	2
Heidelberg	4	–	2	–	0	4	–	3	–	0
Akron	4	–	3	–	0	5	–	3	–	0
Ohio Wesleyan	2	–	2	–	1	4	–	3	–	2
Denison	3	–	4	–	0	3	–	5	–	0
Marietta	2	–	3	–	1	2	–	3	–	1
Otterbein	2	–	4	–	0	2	–	4	–	1
Ohio Northern	2	–	5	–	0	3	–	6	–	0
Western Reserve	2	–	5	–	0	2	–	6	–	0
Capital	1	–	3	–	0	3	–	4	–	0
Baldwin–Wallace	2	–	6	–	0	2	–	6	–	0
Case	2	–	6	–	0	2	–	6	–	0
Cincinnati	0	–	4	–	2	2	–	5	–	2
Kenyon	1	–	5	–	0	1	–	6	–	1
Hiram	0	–	7	–	0	0	–	7	–	0
St. Xavier *	1	–	0	–	0	8	–	1	–	1
+ – Conference co-champions; * – did not compete for championship

The 1927 Miami Redskins football team was an American football team that represented Miami University as a member of the Buckeye Athletic Association (BAA) and the Ohio Athletic Conference (OAC) during the 1927 college football season. In its fourth season under head coach Chester Pittser, Miami compiled an 8–1 record (3–1 against conference opponents) and finished in second place out of six teams in the BAA.

== Schedule ==
Date	Opponent	Site	Result	Attendance	Source
September 24	Hanover*	Miami Field; Oxford, OH	W 80–0		
October 1	Otterbein	Miami Field; Oxford, OH	W 33–0		
October 8	at Ohio Wesleyan	Delaware, OH	W 35–7		
October 15	Denison	Miami Field; Oxford, OH	W 26–0		
October 22	Oberlin	Miami Field; Oxford, OH	W 23–0		
October 29	Wittenberg	Miami Field; Oxford, OH	L 0–23		
November 5	at Ohio Northern*	Ada, OH	W 34–6		
November 12	at Dayton	Dayton, OH	W 7–6	7,500	
November 24	at Cincinnati	Nippert Stadium; Cincinnati, OH (Victory Bell)	W 17–14		
*Non-conference game
