= 1925 University of Akron football team =

American college football season

1925 Akron football
- Conference: Ohio Athletic Conference
- Record: 1–7 (1–6 OAC)
- Head coach: James W. Coleman (2nd season)
- Captain: Joseph Schoch
- Home stadium: Buchtel Field

1925 Ohio Athletic Conference football standings
	Conf.					Overall
Team	W		L		T	W		L		T
Ohio Wesleyan $	6	–	0	–	0	7	–	1	–	1
Oberlin	5	–	0	–	1	7	–	0	–	1
Wooster	5	–	1	–	0	6	–	2	–	0
Kenyon	5	–	2	–	0	6	–	2	–	0
St. Xavier	3	–	1	–	1	5	–	2	–	1
Mount Union	4	–	2	–	1	7	–	2	–	1
Baldwin–Wallace	5	–	3	–	0	5	–	3	–	0
Ohio	3	–	2	–	0	6	–	2	–	0
Miami (OH)	3	–	2	–	0	5	–	3	–	0
Muskingum	3	–	3	–	0	4	–	3	–	1
Case	3	–	4	–	2	3	–	4	–	2
Denison	3	–	4	–	0	4	–	4	–	1
Heidelberg	3	–	4	–	0	4	–	4	–	0
Cincinnati	2	–	3	–	0	4	–	5	–	0
Wittenberg	3	–	5	–	1	3	–	5	–	1
Ohio Northern	2	–	4	–	1	3	–	4	–	1
Western Reserve	2	–	5	–	0	3	–	6	–	0
Hiram	0	–	5	–	2	0	–	5	–	3
Akron	1	–	6	–	0	1	–	7	–	0
Otterbein	0	–	5	–	1	0	–	6	–	2
$ – Conference champion

The 1925 Akron football team was an American football team that represented the University of Akron in the Ohio Athletic Conference (OAC) during the 1925 college football season. In its second season under head coach James W. Coleman, the team compiled a 1–7 record (1–6 against conference opponents) and was outscored by a total of 150 to 17. Joseph Schoch was the team captain.

== Schedule ==
Date	Opponent	Site	Result	Attendance	Source
September 26	at Wittenberg	Lutheran Stadium; Springfield, OH	L 3–13	8,000	
October 10	at Ohio Wesleyan	Edwards Field; Delaware, OH	L 0–27		
October 17	Case	Buchtel Field; Akron, OH	W 14–7		
October 24	Fordham*	Buchtel Field; Akron, OH	L 0–28		
October 31	Baldwin–Wallace	Buchtel Field; Akron, OH	L 0–6		
November 7	at Xavier	Corcoran Field; Cincinnati, OH	L 0–19		
November 14	Wooster	Buchtel Field; Akron, OH	L 0–20		
November 21	Kenyon	Buchtel Field; Akron, OH	L 0–30		
*Non-conference game
