= 1921 Cincinnati Bearcats football team =

American college football season

1921 Cincinnati Bearcats football
- Conference: Ohio Athletic Conference
- Record: 3–6 (0–4 OAC)
- Head coach: Boyd Chambers (4th season)
- Captain: Frank Crolley
- Home stadium: Carson Field

1921 Ohio Athletic Conference football standings
	Conf.					Overall
Team	W		L		T	W		L		T
Miami (OH) $	7	–	0	–	0	8	–	0	–	0
St. Xavier	1	–	0	–	0	6	–	2	–	0
Oberlin	7	–	0	–	1	7	–	0	–	1
Case	6	–	1	–	2	6	–	2	–	2
Wooster	6	–	2	–	0	6	–	2	–	0
Denison	5	–	2	–	0	5	–	3	–	0
Akron	4	–	3	–	0	5	–	3	–	0
Ohio Northern	4	–	3	–	0	5	–	4	–	0
Ohio State	1	–	1	–	0	5	–	2	–	0
Wittenberg	3	–	3	–	2	4	–	3	–	2
Kenyon	1	–	1	–	4	1	–	1	–	5
Ohio	1	–	1	–	0	4	–	4	–	1
Otterbein	1	–	3	–	2	1	–	5	–	2
Western Reserve	2	–	5	–	1	2	–	7	–	1
Hiram	1	–	4	–	2	2	–	4	–	2
Ohio Wesleyan	1	–	6	–	1	1	–	6	–	1
Mount Union	0	–	5	–	1	1	–	6	–	1
Cincinnati	0	–	4	–	0	3	–	6	–	0
Heidelberg	0	–	7	–	0	0	–	7	–	1
$ – Conference champion

The 1921 Cincinnati Bearcats football team was an American football team that represented the University of Cincinnati as a member of the Ohio Athletic Conference during the 1921 college football season. In their fourth and final season under head coach Boyd Chambers, the Bearcats compiled a 3–6 record (0–4 against conference opponents). Frank Crolley was the team captain. The team played home games at Carson Field in Cincinnati.

== Schedule ==
Date	Opponent	Site	Result	Source
September 24	Toledo*	Carson Field; Cincinnati, OH	W 20–0	
October 1	at West Virginia*	Athletic Field; Morgantown, WV (rivalry)	L 0–50	
October 8	Baldwin–Wallace*	Carson Field; Cincinnati, OH	W 17–7	
October 15	at Pittsburgh*	Forbes Field; Pittsburgh, PA	L 14–21	
October 22	Kentucky Wesleyan*	Carson Field; Cincinnati, OH	W 115–0	
October 29	Wittenberg	Carson Field; Cincinnati, OH	L 2–7	
November 5	at Ohio	Athens, OH	L 6–7	
November 12	Denison	Carson Field; Cincinnati, OH	L 0–7	
November 24	Miami (OH)	Carson Field; Cincinnati, OH (Victory Bell)	L 7–15	
*Non-conference game
