= 1927 St. Xavier Musketeers football team =

American college football season

1927 St. Xavier Musketeers football
- Conference: Ohio Athletic Conference
- Record: 8–1–1 (1–0 OAC)
- Head coach: Joseph A. Meyer (8th season)
- Home stadium: Corcoran Field

1927 Ohio Athletic Conference football standings
	Conf.					Overall
Team	W		L		T	W		L		T
Miami (OH) +	7	–	1	–	0	8	–	1	–	0
Muskingum +	7	–	1	–	0	8	–	1	–	0
Oberlin	6	–	1	–	1	6	–	1	–	1
Mount Union	6	–	1	–	1	6	–	2	–	1
Wittenberg	4	–	1	–	0	8	–	2	–	0
Wooster	5	–	2	–	0	6	–	2	–	0
Dayton	2	–	1	–	0	6	–	3	–	0
Ohio	3	–	1	–	2	4	–	2	–	2
Heidelberg	4	–	2	–	0	4	–	3	–	0
Akron	4	–	3	–	0	5	–	3	–	0
Ohio Wesleyan	2	–	2	–	1	4	–	3	–	2
Denison	3	–	4	–	0	3	–	5	–	0
Marietta	2	–	3	–	1	2	–	3	–	1
Otterbein	2	–	4	–	0	2	–	4	–	1
Ohio Northern	2	–	5	–	0	3	–	6	–	0
Western Reserve	2	–	5	–	0	2	–	6	–	0
Capital	1	–	3	–	0	3	–	4	–	0
Baldwin–Wallace	2	–	6	–	0	2	–	6	–	0
Case	2	–	6	–	0	2	–	6	–	0
Cincinnati	0	–	4	–	2	2	–	5	–	2
Kenyon	1	–	5	–	0	1	–	6	–	1
Hiram	0	–	7	–	0	0	–	7	–	0
St. Xavier *	1	–	0	–	0	8	–	1	–	1
+ – Conference co-champions; * – did not compete for championship

The 1927 St. Xavier Musketeers football team was an American football team that represented St. Xavier College (later renamed Xavier University) in the Ohio Athletic Conference (OAC) during the 1927 college football season. In its eighth season under head coach Joseph A. Meyer, the team compiled an 8–1–1 record (1–0 against OAC opponents) and outscored opponents by a total of 411 to 63. The team played its home games at Corcoran Field in Cincinnati.

== Schedule ==
Date	Opponent	Site	Result	Source
September 24	Morris Harvey*	Corcoran Field; Cincinnati, OH	W 39–6	
October 1	Transylvania*	Corcoran Field; Cincinnati, OH	W 39–0	
October 8	at Western Reserve	Vanhorn Field; Cleveland, OH	W 53–7	
October 15	Lees College*	Corcoran Field; Cincinnati, OH	W 132–0	
October 22	Oglethorpe*	Corcoran Field; Cincinnati, OH	W 35–0	
October 29	Providence*	Corcoran Field; Cincinnati, OH	W 27–6	
November 5	Quantico Marines*	Corcoran Field; Cincinnati, OH	L 13–14	
November 12	Catholic University*	Corcoran Field; Cincinnati, OH	W 26–18	
November 19	West Virginia Wesleyan*	Corcoran Field; Cincinnati, OH	W 41–6	
November 24	Haskell*	Corcoran Field; Cincinnati, OH	T 6–6	
*Non-conference game
