= 1935 Kent State Golden Flashes football team =

American college football season

1935 Kent State Golden Flashes football
- Conference: Ohio Athletic Conference
- Record: 3–5 (3–5 OAC)
- Head coach: Donald Starn (1st season)
- Home stadium: Rockwell Field

1935 Ohio Athletic Conference football standings
	Conf.					Overall
Team	W		L		T	W		L		T
Baldwin–Wallace $	8	–	0	–	0	9	–	1	–	0
Mount Union	6	–	1	–	1	7	–	1	–	1
Toledo	4	–	1	–	0	6	–	2	–	1
Capital	5	–	2	–	0	5	–	2	–	0
Akron	6	–	3	–	0	6	–	3	–	0
Marietta	4	–	2	–	0	4	–	4	–	0
Case	3	–	2	–	0	3	–	6	–	0
Muskingum	4	–	3	–	0	5	–	4	–	0
Ohio Northern	3	–	3	–	1	4	–	3	–	1
Wooster	3	–	3	–	2	3	–	4	–	2
Kenyon	2	–	2	–	1	3	–	3	–	1
Denison	3	–	3	–	0	4	–	5	–	0
Heidelberg	3	–	3	–	2	3	–	4	–	2
Wittenberg	3	–	3	–	0	4	–	5	–	0
Oberlin	2	–	2	–	1	3	–	4	–	1
Kent State	3	–	5	–	0	3	–	5	–	0
Ashland	2	–	4	–	1	2	–	4	–	1
Findlay	1	–	3	–	0	4	–	4	–	0
Otterbein	1	–	6	–	1	1	–	6	–	1
Bowling Green	1	–	6	–	0	1	–	6	–	0
John Carroll	0	–	4	–	0	1	–	8	–	0
Hiram	0	–	6	–	0	0	–	8	–	0
$ – Conference champion

The 1935 Kent State Golden Flashes football team was an American football team that represented Kent State University in the Ohio Athletic Conference (OAC) during the 1935 college football season. In its first season under head coach Donald Starn, Kent State compiled a 3–5 record.

== Schedule ==
Date	Opponent	Site	Result	Attendance	Source
September 27	at Mount Union	Alliance, OH	L 0–19		
October 5	Heidelberg	Rockwell Field; Kent, OH	L 6–21		
October 11	at Akron	Buchtel Field; Akron, OH (rivalry)	L 0–3	3,000	
October 19	Otterbein	Rockwell Field; Kent, OH	W 6–0		
October 26	Bowling Green	Rockwell Field; Kent, OH (rivalry)	W 45–0		
November 2	at Hiram	Hiram, OH	W 45–6		
November 9	at Baldwin–Wallace	Berea, OH	L 18–40		
November 16	at Ashland	Ashland, OH	L 7–19		
