= 1921 Miami Redskins football team =

American college football season

1921 Miami Redskins football

OAC champion
- Conference: Ohio Athletic Conference
- Record: 8–0 (7–0 OAC)
- Head coach: George Little (4th season)
- Home stadium: Miami Field

1921 Ohio Athletic Conference football standings
	Conf.					Overall
Team	W		L		T	W		L		T
Miami (OH) $	7	–	0	–	0	8	–	0	–	0
St. Xavier	1	–	0	–	0	6	–	2	–	0
Oberlin	7	–	0	–	1	7	–	0	–	1
Case	6	–	1	–	2	6	–	2	–	2
Wooster	6	–	2	–	0	6	–	2	–	0
Denison	5	–	2	–	0	5	–	3	–	0
Akron	4	–	3	–	0	5	–	3	–	0
Ohio Northern	4	–	3	–	0	5	–	4	–	0
Ohio State	1	–	1	–	0	5	–	2	–	0
Wittenberg	3	–	3	–	2	4	–	3	–	2
Kenyon	1	–	1	–	4	1	–	1	–	5
Ohio	1	–	1	–	0	4	–	4	–	1
Otterbein	1	–	3	–	2	1	–	5	–	2
Western Reserve	2	–	5	–	1	2	–	7	–	1
Hiram	1	–	4	–	2	2	–	4	–	2
Ohio Wesleyan	1	–	6	–	1	1	–	6	–	1
Mount Union	0	–	5	–	1	1	–	6	–	1
Cincinnati	0	–	4	–	0	3	–	6	–	0
Heidelberg	0	–	7	–	0	0	–	7	–	1
$ – Conference champion

The 1921 Miami Redskins football team was an American football team that represented Miami University as a member of the Ohio Athletic Conference (OAC) during the 1921 college football season. In its fourth and final season under head coach George Little, Miami compiled an 8–0 record (7–0 against conference opponents), shut out six of eight opponents, and won the OAC championship.

== Schedule ==
Date	Opponent	Site	Result	Source
October 1	Dayton*	Miami Field; Oxford, OH	W 55–0	
October 8	Wittenberg	Miami Field; Oxford, OH	W 14–0	
October 15	at Ohio Northern	Ada, OH	W 27–0	
October 22	Ohio Wesleyan	Miami Field; Oxford, OH	W 56–0	
October 29	vs. Denison	Dayton, OH	W 21–6	
November 5	Otterbein	Miami Field; Oxford, OH	W 21–0	
November 12	at Mount Union	Alliance, OHohi	W 29–0	
November 24	at Cincinnati	Carson Field; Cincinnati, OH (Victory Bell)	W 15–7	
*Non-conference game
