= 1911 Ohio Green and White football team =

American college football season

1911 Ohio Green and White football
- Conference: Independent
- Record: 3–3–2
- Head coach: Arthur Hinaman (1st season)

1911 Ohio Athletic Conference football standings
	Conf.					Overall
Team	W		L		T	W		L		T
Oberlin $	4	–	0	–	1	6	–	1	–	1
Case	5	–	1	–	1	5	–	2	–	1
Ohio Wesleyan	6	–	2	–	0	6	–	3	–	0
Ohio State	4	–	1	–	2	5	–	3	–	2
Cincinnati	2	–	1	–	1	6	–	2	–	1
Denison	3	–	2	–	2	6	–	2	–	2
Western Reserve	1	–	3	–	2	4	–	3	–	4
Ohio	1	–	2	–	0	3	–	3	–	2
Miami (OH)	1	–	3	–	1	2	–	4	–	2
Wittenberg	1	–	4	–	0	3	–	6	–	0
Kenyon	0	–	6	–	0	1	–	7	–	1
Wooster	0	–	4	–	0	0	–	6	–	0
$ – Conference champion

The 1911 Ohio Green and White football team represented Ohio University as an independent during the 1911 college football season. Led by first-year head coach Arthur Hinaman, the Green and White compiled a record of 3–3–2.

== Schedule ==
Date	Opponent	Site	Result
October 7	at Ohio Wesleyan	Delaware, OH	L 0–10
October 14	at West Virginia	Morgantown, WV	L 0–3
October 21	Marshall	Athens, OH (rivalry)	T 5–5
October 28	at Otterbein	Westerville, OH	T 11–11
November 4	Kenyon	Athens, OH	W 16–0
November 11	Muskingum		W 50–0
November 18	at Wittenberg	Springfield, OH	L 0–10
November 30	at Marietta	Marietta, OH	W 6–5
