= 1925 Case Scientists football team =

American college football season

1925 Case Scientists football
- Conference: Ohio Athletic Conference
- Record: 3–4–2 (3–4–2 OAC)
- Head coach: Robert H. Fletcher (2nd season)
- Home stadium: Van Horn Field

1925 Ohio Athletic Conference football standings
	Conf.					Overall
Team	W		L		T	W		L		T
Ohio Wesleyan $	6	–	0	–	0	7	–	1	–	1
Oberlin	5	–	0	–	1	7	–	0	–	1
Wooster	5	–	1	–	0	6	–	2	–	0
Kenyon	5	–	2	–	0	6	–	2	–	0
St. Xavier	3	–	1	–	1	5	–	2	–	1
Mount Union	4	–	2	–	1	7	–	2	–	1
Baldwin–Wallace	5	–	3	–	0	5	–	3	–	0
Ohio	3	–	2	–	0	6	–	2	–	0
Miami (OH)	3	–	2	–	0	5	–	3	–	0
Muskingum	3	–	3	–	0	4	–	3	–	1
Case	3	–	4	–	2	3	–	4	–	2
Denison	3	–	4	–	0	4	–	4	–	1
Heidelberg	3	–	4	–	0	4	–	4	–	0
Cincinnati	2	–	3	–	0	4	–	5	–	0
Wittenberg	3	–	5	–	1	3	–	5	–	1
Ohio Northern	2	–	4	–	1	3	–	4	–	1
Western Reserve	2	–	5	–	0	3	–	6	–	0
Hiram	0	–	5	–	2	0	–	5	–	3
Akron	1	–	6	–	0	1	–	7	–	0
Otterbein	0	–	5	–	1	0	–	6	–	2
$ – Conference champion

The 1925 Case football team was an American football team that represented the Case School of Applied Science, now a part of Case Western Reserve University, during the 1925 college football season. In its second season under head coach Robert H. Fletcher, the team compiled a 3–4–2 record. The team played its home games at Van Horn Field in Cleveland.

== Schedule ==
Date	Opponent	Site	Result	Source
September 26	Baldwin–Wallace	Van Horn Field; Cleveland, OH	W 17–7	
October 3	at Wooster	Wooster, OH	L 0–11	
October 10	Otterbein	Van Horn Field; Cleveland, OH	W 9–0	
October 17	at Akron	Akron, OH	L 7–14	
October 24	Oberlin	Van Horn Field; Cleveland, OH	L 0–7	
October 31	at Mount Union	Alliance, OH	L 0–32	
November 7	Ohio Northern	Van Horn Field; Cleveland, OH	T 6–6	
November 14	at Hiram	Hiram, OH	T 14–14	
November 21	at Western Reserve	Shaw Field	W 6–0	
