= 1922 Miami Redskins football team =

American college football season

1922 Miami Redskins football
- Conference: Ohio Athletic Conference
- Record: 4–3–1 (4–3 OAC)
- Head coach: Harry W. Ewing (1st season)
- Home stadium: Miami Field

1922 Ohio Athletic Conference football standings
	Conf.					Overall
Team	W		L		T	W		L		T
Ohio Wesleyan $	7	–	0	–	0	8	–	1	–	0
Oberlin	5	–	0	–	0	6	–	1	–	0
St. Xavier	2	–	0	–	0	7	–	2	–	0
Wooster	7	–	1	–	0	8	–	1	–	0
Ohio	3	–	1	–	0	5	–	3	–	0
Mount Union	5	–	2	–	0	6	–	2	–	1
Wittenberg	5	–	2	–	1	6	–	2	–	1
Akron	5	–	3	–	0	5	–	3	–	0
Denison	4	–	3	–	0	6	–	3	–	0
Miami (OH)	4	–	3	–	0	4	–	3	–	1
Kenyon	2	–	4	–	0	3	–	5	–	0
Western Reserve	3	–	6	–	0	3	–	7	–	0
Cincinnati	1	–	3	–	1	1	–	7	–	1
Ohio Northern	2	–	5	–	0	4	–	5	–	0
Otterbein	2	–	6	–	0	2	–	6	–	0
Case	2	–	7	–	0	2	–	8	–	0
Muskingum	1	–	4	–	0	4	–	5	–	0
Hiram	1	–	6	–	0	2	–	7	–	0
Heidelberg	1	–	6	–	0	1	–	7	–	0
$ – Conference champion

The 1922 Miami Redskins football team was an American football team that represented Miami University as a member of the Ohio Athletic Conference (OAC) during the 1922 college football season. In its second and final season under head coach Harry W. Ewing, Miami compiled a 4–3–1 record (4–3 against conference opponents) and finished in 10th place out of 19 teams in the OAC.

== Schedule ==
Date	Opponent	Site	Result
September 30	Alumni*	Miami Field; Oxford, OH	T 0–0
October 14	Akron	Miami Field; Oxford, OH	W 20–12
October 21	Ohio Northern	Miami Field; Oxford, OH	W 6–0
October 28	vs. Denison	Dayton, OH	L 6–12
November 4	at Ohio Wesleyan	Delaware, OH	L 0–6
November 11	Mount Union	Miami Field; Oxford, OH	W 20–6
November 18	at Oberlin	Oberlin, OH	L 0–3
November 30	at Cincinnati	Nippert Stadium; Cincinnati, OH (Victory Bell)	W 9–6
*Non-conference game
