= 1922 Cincinnati Bearcats football team =

American college football season

1922 Cincinnati Bearcats football
- Conference: Ohio Athletic Conference
- Record: 1–7–1 (1–3–1 OAC)
- Head coach: George McLaren (1st season)
- Captain: Mike Palmer
- Home stadium: Carson Field

1922 Ohio Athletic Conference football standings
	Conf.					Overall
Team	W		L		T	W		L		T
Ohio Wesleyan $	7	–	0	–	0	8	–	1	–	0
Oberlin	5	–	0	–	0	6	–	1	–	0
St. Xavier	2	–	0	–	0	7	–	2	–	0
Wooster	7	–	1	–	0	8	–	1	–	0
Ohio	3	–	1	–	0	5	–	3	–	0
Mount Union	5	–	2	–	0	6	–	2	–	1
Wittenberg	5	–	2	–	1	6	–	2	–	1
Akron	5	–	3	–	0	5	–	3	–	0
Denison	4	–	3	–	0	6	–	3	–	0
Miami (OH)	4	–	3	–	0	4	–	3	–	1
Kenyon	2	–	4	–	0	3	–	5	–	0
Western Reserve	3	–	6	–	0	3	–	7	–	0
Cincinnati	1	–	3	–	1	1	–	7	–	1
Ohio Northern	2	–	5	–	0	4	–	5	–	0
Otterbein	2	–	6	–	0	2	–	6	–	0
Case	2	–	7	–	0	2	–	8	–	0
Muskingum	1	–	4	–	0	4	–	5	–	0
Hiram	1	–	6	–	0	2	–	7	–	0
Heidelberg	1	–	6	–	0	1	–	7	–	0
$ – Conference champion

The 1922 Cincinnati Bearcats football team was an American football team that represented the University of Cincinnati as a member of the Ohio Athletic Conference during the 1922 college football season. In their first season under head coach George McLaren, the Bearcats compiled a 1–7–1 record (1–3–1 against conference opponents). Mike Palmer was the team captain. The team played home games at Carson Field in Cincinnati.

== Schedule ==
Date	Opponent	Site	Result	Attendance	Source
September 30	Pittsburgh*	Carson Field; Cincinnati, OH	L 14–21		
October 7	at Kentucky*	Stoll Field; Lexington, KY	L 0–15		
October 14	at Georgetown*	Griffith Stadium; Washington, DC	L 0–37		
October 21	Ohio Wesleyan	Carson Field; Cincinnati, OH	L 7–14		
October 28	at Case	Cleveland, OH	W 16–0		
November 4	West Virginia*	Carson Field; Cincinnati, OH (rivalry)	L 0–34	2,500	
November 11	Denison	Carson Field; Cincinnati, OH	L 0–22		
November 18	at Wittenberg	Springfield, OH	T 6–6		
November 30	Miami (OH)	Carson Field; Cincinnati, OH (Victory Bell)	L 6–9		
*Non-conference game
