= 1925 Ohio Wesleyan Battling Bishops football team =

American college football season

1925 Ohio Wesleyan Battling Bishops football

OAC champion
- Conference: Ohio Athletic Conference
- Record: 7–1–1 (6–0 OAC)
- Head coach: George Gauthier (5th season)
- Home stadium: Edwards Field

1925 Ohio Athletic Conference football standings
	Conf.					Overall
Team	W		L		T	W		L		T
Ohio Wesleyan $	6	–	0	–	0	7	–	1	–	1
Oberlin	5	–	0	–	1	7	–	0	–	1
Wooster	5	–	1	–	0	6	–	2	–	0
Kenyon	5	–	2	–	0	6	–	2	–	0
St. Xavier	3	–	1	–	1	5	–	2	–	1
Mount Union	4	–	2	–	1	7	–	2	–	1
Baldwin–Wallace	5	–	3	–	0	5	–	3	–	0
Ohio	3	–	2	–	0	6	–	2	–	0
Miami (OH)	3	–	2	–	0	5	–	3	–	0
Muskingum	3	–	3	–	0	4	–	3	–	1
Case	3	–	4	–	2	3	–	4	–	2
Denison	3	–	4	–	0	4	–	4	–	1
Heidelberg	3	–	4	–	0	4	–	4	–	0
Cincinnati	2	–	3	–	0	4	–	5	–	0
Wittenberg	3	–	5	–	1	3	–	5	–	1
Ohio Northern	2	–	4	–	1	3	–	4	–	1
Western Reserve	2	–	5	–	0	3	–	6	–	0
Hiram	0	–	5	–	2	0	–	5	–	3
Akron	1	–	6	–	0	1	–	7	–	0
Otterbein	0	–	5	–	1	0	–	6	–	2
$ – Conference champion

The 1925 Ohio Wesleyan Battling Bishops football team was an American football team that represented Ohio Wesleyan University as a member of the Ohio Athletic Conference (OAC) during the 1925 college football season. In its fifth season under head coach George Gauthier, the team compiled a 7–1–1 record (6–0 against OAC opponents), won the OAC championship, shut out six of nine opponents, and outscored all opponents by a combined score of 219 to 25.

The team was undefeated in games against OAC opponents, sustaining its only loss by a single touchdown to Ohio State and playing Syracuse to a 3–3 tie. The team played its home games at Edwards Field in Delaware, Ohio.

== Schedule ==
Date	Opponent	Site	Result	Attendance	Source
September 26	Capital*	Edwards Field; Delaware, OH	W 41–0		
October 3	at Ohio State*	Ohio Stadium; Columbus, OH	L 3–10	45,000	
October 10	Akron	Edwards Field; Delaware, OH	W 27–0		
October 17	Ohio Northern	Edwards Field; Delaware, OH	W 24–0	2,500	
October 24	at Ohio	Athens, OH	W 26–0		
October 31	Wittenberg	Edwards Field; Delaware, OH	W 28–12		
November 7	at Syracuse*	Archbold Stadium; Syracuse, NY	T 3–3	12,000	
November 14	at Denison	Granville, OH	W 26–0		
November 21	at St. Xavier	Cincinnati, OH	W 41–0	12,000	
*Non-conference game
