= 1935 Baldwin–Wallace Yellow Jackets football team =

American college football season

1935 Baldwin–Wallace Yellow Jackets football

OAC champion
- Conference: Ohio Athletic Conference
- Record: 9–1 (8–0 OAC)
- Head coach: Ray E. Watts (8th season)

1935 Ohio Athletic Conference football standings
	Conf.					Overall
Team	W		L		T	W		L		T
Baldwin–Wallace $	8	–	0	–	0	9	–	1	–	0
Mount Union	6	–	1	–	1	7	–	1	–	1
Toledo	4	–	1	–	0	6	–	2	–	1
Capital	5	–	2	–	0	5	–	2	–	0
Akron	6	–	3	–	0	6	–	3	–	0
Marietta	4	–	2	–	0	4	–	4	–	0
Case	3	–	2	–	0	3	–	6	–	0
Muskingum	4	–	3	–	0	5	–	4	–	0
Ohio Northern	3	–	3	–	1	4	–	3	–	1
Wooster	3	–	3	–	2	3	–	4	–	2
Kenyon	2	–	2	–	1	3	–	3	–	1
Denison	3	–	3	–	0	4	–	5	–	0
Heidelberg	3	–	3	–	2	3	–	4	–	2
Wittenberg	3	–	3	–	0	4	–	5	–	0
Oberlin	2	–	2	–	1	3	–	4	–	1
Kent State	3	–	5	–	0	3	–	5	–	0
Ashland	2	–	4	–	1	2	–	4	–	1
Findlay	1	–	3	–	0	4	–	4	–	0
Otterbein	1	–	6	–	1	1	–	6	–	1
Bowling Green	1	–	6	–	0	1	–	6	–	0
John Carroll	0	–	4	–	0	1	–	8	–	0
Hiram	0	–	6	–	0	0	–	8	–	0
$ – Conference champion

The 1935 Baldwin–Wallace Yellow Jackets football team was an American football team that represented Baldwin–Wallace University as a member of the Ohio Athletic Conference (OAC) during the 1935 college football season. In their eighth year under head coach Ray E. Watts, the Yellow Jackets compiled a 9–1 record (8–0 against conference opponents), won the OAC championship, and outscored opponents by a total of 438 to 57.

With 438 points scored (43.8 points per game), Baldwin-Wallace was the highest scoring team in the nation. The 381-point delta between points scored and points allowed was the highest in Baldwin-Wallace program history.

The team's key players included tackle William Krause and back Kenneth Nobel. Both were selected as first-team players on the 1935 All-Ohio football team.

== Schedule ==
Date	Opponent	Site	Result	Attendance	Source
September 28	at Buffalo*	Buffalo, NY	W 55–0		
October 4	at John Carroll	Cleveland, OH	W 33–6		
October 12	at Bowling Green	Bowling Green, OH	W 41–0		
October 19	at Western Reserve*	League Park; Cleveland, OH	L 14–27	25,000	
October 26	Ashland	Berea, OH	W 60–0		
November 2	at Case	Cleveland, OH	W 33–0		
November 9	Kent State	Berea, OH	W 33–0		
November 16	Findlay	Berea, OH	W 79–0		
November 23	at Wooster	Wooster, OH	W 57–0		
November 28	at Akon	Akron, OH	W 26–6	5,300	
*Non-conference game
