= 1922 St. Xavier Saints football team =

American college football season

1922 St. Xavier Saints football
- Conference: Ohio Athletic Conference
- Record: 6–2–1 (2–0 OAC)
- Head coach: Joseph A. Meyer (3rd season)

1922 Ohio Athletic Conference football standings
	Conf.					Overall
Team	W		L		T	W		L		T
Ohio Wesleyan $	7	–	0	–	0	8	–	1	–	0
Oberlin	5	–	0	–	0	6	–	1	–	0
St. Xavier	2	–	0	–	0	7	–	2	–	0
Wooster	7	–	1	–	0	8	–	1	–	0
Ohio	3	–	1	–	0	5	–	3	–	0
Mount Union	5	–	2	–	0	6	–	2	–	1
Wittenberg	5	–	2	–	1	6	–	2	–	1
Akron	5	–	3	–	0	5	–	3	–	0
Denison	4	–	3	–	0	6	–	3	–	0
Miami (OH)	4	–	3	–	0	4	–	3	–	1
Kenyon	2	–	4	–	0	3	–	5	–	0
Western Reserve	3	–	6	–	0	3	–	7	–	0
Cincinnati	1	–	3	–	1	1	–	7	–	1
Ohio Northern	2	–	5	–	0	4	–	5	–	0
Otterbein	2	–	6	–	0	2	–	6	–	0
Case	2	–	7	–	0	2	–	8	–	0
Muskingum	1	–	4	–	0	4	–	5	–	0
Hiram	1	–	6	–	0	2	–	7	–	0
Heidelberg	1	–	6	–	0	1	–	7	–	0
$ – Conference champion

The 1922 St. Xavier Musketeers Football Team was an American football team that represented St. Xavier College (later renamed Xavier University) at the Ohio Athletic Conference (OAC) during the 1922 college football season. In its third season under head coach Joseph A. Meyer, the team compiled a 6–2–1 record and outscored opponents by a total of 209 to 109.

== Schedule ==
Date	Opponent	Site	Result	Source
October 7	Morris Harvey*	Corcoran Field; Cincinnati, OH	W 45–6	
October 14	Dayton*	Corcoran Field; Cincinnati, OH	W 46–13	
October 21	at St. Ignatius (OH)*	Cleveland, OH	T 19–19	
October 28	Maryville (TN)*	Corcoran Field; Cincinnati, OH	W 25–0	
November 4	at Ohio	Athens, OH	W 13–7	
November 11	at Navy*	Worden Field; Annapolis, MD	L 0–52	
November 18	Franklin (IN)*	Corcoran Field; Cincinnati, OH	W 20–0	
November 25	Otterbein	Corcoran Field; Cincinnati, OH	W 32–0	
November 30	Haskell*	Corcoran Field; Cincinnati, OH	L 9–12	
*Non-conference game
