= 1925 Oberlin Congregationalists football team =

American college football season

1925 Oberlin Congregationalists football
- Conference: Ohio Athletic Conference
- Record: 7–0–1 (5–0–1 OAC)
- Head coach: Paul N. MacEachron (1st season)
- Home stadium: Oberlin Stadium

1925 Ohio Athletic Conference football standings
	Conf.					Overall
Team	W		L		T	W		L		T
Ohio Wesleyan $	6	–	0	–	0	7	–	1	–	1
Oberlin	5	–	0	–	1	7	–	0	–	1
Wooster	5	–	1	–	0	6	–	2	–	0
Kenyon	5	–	2	–	0	6	–	2	–	0
St. Xavier	3	–	1	–	1	5	–	2	–	1
Mount Union	4	–	2	–	1	7	–	2	–	1
Baldwin–Wallace	5	–	3	–	0	5	–	3	–	0
Ohio	3	–	2	–	0	6	–	2	–	0
Miami (OH)	3	–	2	–	0	5	–	3	–	0
Muskingum	3	–	3	–	0	4	–	3	–	1
Case	3	–	4	–	2	3	–	4	–	2
Denison	3	–	4	–	0	4	–	4	–	1
Heidelberg	3	–	4	–	0	4	–	4	–	0
Cincinnati	2	–	3	–	0	4	–	5	–	0
Wittenberg	3	–	5	–	1	3	–	5	–	1
Ohio Northern	2	–	4	–	1	3	–	4	–	1
Western Reserve	2	–	5	–	0	3	–	6	–	0
Hiram	0	–	5	–	2	0	–	5	–	3
Akron	1	–	6	–	0	1	–	7	–	0
Otterbein	0	–	5	–	1	0	–	6	–	2
$ – Conference champion

The 1925 Oberlin Congregationalists football team was an American football team that represented Oberlin College in the Ohio Athletic Conference (OAC) during the 1925 college football season. In their first season under head coach Paul N. MacEachron, the Congregationalists compiled a 7–0–1 record (5–0–1 against OAC opponents), finished in second place in the OAC, shut out five of eight opponents, and outscored all opponents by a total of 92 to 19.

In the season's first game, Oberlin dedicated its new athletic stadium. At that time, the first four sections were opened with seating for 3,000 persons.

== Schedule ==
Date	Opponent	Site	Result	Source
September 26	Albion*	Oberlin Stadium; Oberlin, OH	W 7–0	
October 3	Baldwin–Wallace	Oberlin Stadium; Oberlin, OH	W 9–6	
October 10	at Wooster	Severance Stadium; Wooster, OH	W 13–0	
October 17	Mount Union	Oberlin Stadium; Oberlin, OH	T 0–0	
October 24	Case	Van Horn Field; Cleveland, OH	W 7–0	
October 31	Rochester*	Oberlin Stadium; Oberlin, OH	W 24–0	
November 7	Western Reserve^{†}	Oberlin Stadium; Oberlin, OH	W 14–6	
November 14	at Miami (OH)	Miami Field; Oxford, OH	W 18–7	
*Non-conference game; ^{†}Homecoming
