= 1925 St. Xavier Musketeers football team =

American college football season

1925 St. Xavier Musketeers football
- Conference: Ohio Athletic Conference
- Record: 5–2–1 (3–1–1 OAC)
- Head coach: Joseph A. Meyer (6th season)
- Captain: George Reynolds
- Home stadium: Corcoran Field

1925 Ohio Athletic Conference football standings
	Conf.					Overall
Team	W		L		T	W		L		T
Ohio Wesleyan $	6	–	0	–	0	7	–	1	–	1
Oberlin	5	–	0	–	1	7	–	0	–	1
Wooster	5	–	1	–	0	6	–	2	–	0
Kenyon	5	–	2	–	0	6	–	2	–	0
St. Xavier	3	–	1	–	1	5	–	2	–	1
Mount Union	4	–	2	–	1	7	–	2	–	1
Baldwin–Wallace	5	–	3	–	0	5	–	3	–	0
Ohio	3	–	2	–	0	6	–	2	–	0
Miami (OH)	3	–	2	–	0	5	–	3	–	0
Muskingum	3	–	3	–	0	4	–	3	–	1
Case	3	–	4	–	2	3	–	4	–	2
Denison	3	–	4	–	0	4	–	4	–	1
Heidelberg	3	–	4	–	0	4	–	4	–	0
Cincinnati	2	–	3	–	0	4	–	5	–	0
Wittenberg	3	–	5	–	1	3	–	5	–	1
Ohio Northern	2	–	4	–	1	3	–	4	–	1
Western Reserve	2	–	5	–	0	3	–	6	–	0
Hiram	0	–	5	–	2	0	–	5	–	3
Akron	1	–	6	–	0	1	–	7	–	0
Otterbein	0	–	5	–	1	0	–	6	–	2
$ – Conference champion

The 1925 St. Xavier Musketeers football team was an American football team that represented St. Xavier College (later renamed Xavier University) in the Ohio Athletic Conference (OAC) during the 1925 college football season. In its sixth season under head coach Joseph A. Meyer, the team compiled a 5–2–1 record (3–1–1 against OAC opponents) and finished in fifth place in the OAC. George Reynolds was the team captain. The team played its home games at Corcoran Field in Cincinnati.

The nickname "Musketeers" was adopted for the football team at the start of the 1925 season. The name was chosen by Father F. J. Finn and was announced in the program for the October 3 game against Transylvania.

== Schedule ==
Date	Opponent	Site	Result	Attendance	Source
October 3	Transylvania*	Corcoran Field; Cincinnati, OH	W 20–0	4,000	
October 10	Kentucky Wesleyan*	Corcoran Field; Cincinnati, OH	W 50–0		
October 17	Wittenberg	Corcoran Field; Cincinnati, OH	T 7–7		
October 24	at Ohio Northern	Ada, OH	W 19–0		
October 31	Kenyon	Corcoran Field; Cincinnati, OH	W 6–0		
November 7	Akron	Corcoran Field; Cincinnati, OH	W 19–0		
November 21	Ohio Wesleyan^{†}	Corcoran Field; Cincinnati, OH	L 0–41	12,000	
November 26	Haskell*	Corcoran Field; Cincinnati, OH	L 8–34		
*Non-conference game; ^{†}Homecoming
