= 1927 Ohio Bobcats football team =

American college football season

1927 Ohio Bobcats football
- Conference: Buckeye Athletic Association, Ohio Athletic Conference
- Record: 4–2–2 (1–1–2 BAA, 3–1–2 OAC)
- Head coach: Don Peden (4th season)

1927 Buckeye Athletic Association football standings
| | Conf. | | | | | Overall |
| Team | W | | L | | T | W | | L | | T |
|---|---|---|---|---|---|---|---|---|---|---|
| Wittenberg $ | 4 | – | 0 | – | 0 | 8 | – | 2 | – | 0 |
| Miami (OH) | 3 | – | 1 | – | 0 | 8 | – | 1 | – | 0 |
| Ohio | 1 | – | 1 | – | 2 | 4 | – | 2 | – | 2 |
| Ohio Wesleyan | 1 | – | 2 | – | 1 | 4 | – | 3 | – | 2 |
| Denison | 1 | – | 3 | – | 0 | 3 | – | 5 | – | 0 |
| Cincinnati | 0 | – | 3 | – | 1 | 2 | – | 5 | – | 2 |
$ – Conference champion

1927 Ohio Athletic Conference football standings
| | Conf. | | | | | Overall |
| Team | W | | L | | T | W | | L | | T |
|---|---|---|---|---|---|---|---|---|---|---|
| Miami (OH) + | 7 | – | 1 | – | 0 | 8 | – | 1 | – | 0 |
| Muskingum + | 7 | – | 1 | – | 0 | 8 | – | 1 | – | 0 |
| Oberlin | 6 | – | 1 | – | 1 | 6 | – | 1 | – | 1 |
| Mount Union | 6 | – | 1 | – | 1 | 6 | – | 2 | – | 1 |
| Wittenberg | 4 | – | 1 | – | 0 | 8 | – | 2 | – | 0 |
| Wooster | 5 | – | 2 | – | 0 | 6 | – | 2 | – | 0 |
| Dayton | 2 | – | 1 | – | 0 | 6 | – | 3 | – | 0 |
| Ohio | 3 | – | 1 | – | 2 | 4 | – | 2 | – | 2 |
| Heidelberg | 4 | – | 2 | – | 0 | 4 | – | 3 | – | 0 |
| Akron | 4 | – | 3 | – | 0 | 5 | – | 3 | – | 0 |
| Ohio Wesleyan | 2 | – | 2 | – | 1 | 4 | – | 3 | – | 2 |
| Denison | 3 | – | 4 | – | 0 | 3 | – | 5 | – | 0 |
| Marietta | 2 | – | 3 | – | 1 | 2 | – | 3 | – | 1 |
| Otterbein | 2 | – | 4 | – | 0 | 2 | – | 4 | – | 1 |
| Ohio Northern | 2 | – | 5 | – | 0 | 3 | – | 6 | – | 0 |
| Western Reserve | 2 | – | 5 | – | 0 | 2 | – | 6 | – | 0 |
| Capital | 1 | – | 3 | – | 0 | 3 | – | 4 | – | 0 |
| Baldwin–Wallace | 2 | – | 6 | – | 0 | 2 | – | 6 | – | 0 |
| Case | 2 | – | 6 | – | 0 | 2 | – | 6 | – | 0 |
| Cincinnati | 0 | – | 4 | – | 2 | 2 | – | 5 | – | 2 |
| Kenyon | 1 | – | 5 | – | 0 | 1 | – | 6 | – | 1 |
| Hiram | 0 | – | 7 | – | 0 | 0 | – | 7 | – | 0 |
| St. Xavier * | 1 | – | 0 | – | 0 | 8 | – | 1 | – | 1 |
+ – Conference co-champions; * – did not compete for championship

The 1927 Ohio Bobcats football team was an American football team that represented Ohio University in the Buckeye Athletic Association (BAA) and the Ohio Athletic Conference (OAC) during the 1927 college football season. In their fourth season under head coach Don Peden, the Bobcats compiled a 4–2–2 record and outscored opponents by a total of 85 to 69.

== Schedule ==
| Date | Opponent | Site | Result | Attendance | Source |
|---|---|---|---|---|---|
| September 24 | Rio Grande | Ohio Field; Athens, OH | W 21–0 | | |
| October 1 | at Michigan State | College Field; East Lansing, MI | L 0–27 | | |
| October 8 | Ohio Northern | Ohio Field; Athens, OH | W 25–0 | | |
| October 15 | Marietta | Ohio Field; Athens, OH | W 20–0 | | |
| October 22 | Wittenberg | Ohio Field; Athens, OH | L 0–28 | | |
| November 5 | Denison | Granville, OH | W 12–7 | | |
| November 12 | at Cincinnati | Cincinnati, OH | T 7–7 | | |
| November 19 | Ohio Wesleyan | Ohio Field; Athens, OH | T 0–0 | | |
