= 1927 Dayton Flyers football team =

American college football season

1927 Dayton Flyers football
- Conference: Ohio Athletic Conference
- Record: 6–3 (2–1 OAC)
- Head coach: Harry Baujan (5th season)
- Home stadium: University of Dayton Stadium

1927 Ohio Athletic Conference football standings
	Conf.					Overall
Team	W		L		T	W		L		T
Miami (OH) +	7	–	1	–	0	8	–	1	–	0
Muskingum +	7	–	1	–	0	8	–	1	–	0
Oberlin	6	–	1	–	1	6	–	1	–	1
Mount Union	6	–	1	–	1	6	–	2	–	1
Wittenberg	4	–	1	–	0	8	–	2	–	0
Wooster	5	–	2	–	0	6	–	2	–	0
Dayton	2	–	1	–	0	6	–	3	–	0
Ohio	3	–	1	–	2	4	–	2	–	2
Heidelberg	4	–	2	–	0	4	–	3	–	0
Akron	4	–	3	–	0	5	–	3	–	0
Ohio Wesleyan	2	–	2	–	1	4	–	3	–	2
Denison	3	–	4	–	0	3	–	5	–	0
Marietta	2	–	3	–	1	2	–	3	–	1
Otterbein	2	–	4	–	0	2	–	4	–	1
Ohio Northern	2	–	5	–	0	3	–	6	–	0
Western Reserve	2	–	5	–	0	2	–	6	–	0
Capital	1	–	3	–	0	3	–	4	–	0
Baldwin–Wallace	2	–	6	–	0	2	–	6	–	0
Case	2	–	6	–	0	2	–	6	–	0
Cincinnati	0	–	4	–	2	2	–	5	–	2
Kenyon	1	–	5	–	0	1	–	6	–	1
Hiram	0	–	7	–	0	0	–	7	–	0
St. Xavier *	1	–	0	–	0	8	–	1	–	1
+ – Conference co-champions; * – did not compete for championship

The 1927 Dayton Flyers football team was an American football team that represented the University of Dayton as a member of the Ohio Athletic Conference during the 1927 college football season. In its fifth season under head coach Harry Baujan, the team compiled a 6–3 record.

== Schedule ==
Date	Opponent	Site	Result	Attendance	Source
October 1	Findlay	University of Dayton Stadium; Dayton, OH	W 66–0		
October 8	at Holy Cross	Fitton Field; Worcester, MA	L 0–18	5,000	
October 15	at Cincinnati	Nippert Stadium; Cincinnati, OH	W 9–0	4,000	
October 22	Quantico Marines	University of Dayton Stadium; Dayton, OH	L 0–6		
October 29	Wilmington (OH)	University of Dayton Stadium; Dayton, OH	W 18–7	2,000	
November 5	at Loyola (IL)	Soldier Field; Chicago, IL	W 12–0		
November 12	Miami (OH)	University of Dayton Stadium; Dayton, OH	L 6–7	7,500	
November 19	Haskell	University of Dayton Stadium; Dayton, OH	W 20–14		
November 24	Wittenberg	University of Dayton Stadium; Dayton, OH	W 7–3	11,000	
