= 1927 Akron Zippers football team =

American college football season

1927 Akron Zippers football
- Conference: Ohio Athletic Conference
- Record: 5–3 (4–3 OAC)
- Head coach: Red Blair (1st season)
- Captain: Ben Baldwin
- Home stadium: Buchtel Field

1927 Ohio Athletic Conference football standings
	Conf.					Overall
Team	W		L		T	W		L		T
Miami (OH) +	7	–	1	–	0	8	–	1	–	0
Muskingum +	7	–	1	–	0	8	–	1	–	0
Oberlin	6	–	1	–	1	6	–	1	–	1
Mount Union	6	–	1	–	1	6	–	2	–	1
Wittenberg	4	–	1	–	0	8	–	2	–	0
Wooster	5	–	2	–	0	6	–	2	–	0
Dayton	2	–	1	–	0	6	–	3	–	0
Ohio	3	–	1	–	2	4	–	2	–	2
Heidelberg	4	–	2	–	0	4	–	3	–	0
Akron	4	–	3	–	0	5	–	3	–	0
Ohio Wesleyan	2	–	2	–	1	4	–	3	–	2
Denison	3	–	4	–	0	3	–	5	–	0
Marietta	2	–	3	–	1	2	–	3	–	1
Otterbein	2	–	4	–	0	2	–	4	–	1
Ohio Northern	2	–	5	–	0	3	–	6	–	0
Western Reserve	2	–	5	–	0	2	–	6	–	0
Capital	1	–	3	–	0	3	–	4	–	0
Baldwin–Wallace	2	–	6	–	0	2	–	6	–	0
Case	2	–	6	–	0	2	–	6	–	0
Cincinnati	0	–	4	–	2	2	–	5	–	2
Kenyon	1	–	5	–	0	1	–	6	–	1
Hiram	0	–	7	–	0	0	–	7	–	0
St. Xavier *	1	–	0	–	0	8	–	1	–	1
+ – Conference co-champions; * – did not compete for championship

The 1927 Akron Zippers football team was an American football team that represented the University of Akron in the Ohio Athletic Conference (OAC) during the 1927 college football season. In its first season under head coach Red Blair, the team compiled a 5–3 record (4–3 against conference opponents) and outscored all opponents by a total of 145 to 79. Ben Baldwin was the team captain.

== Schedule ==
Date	Opponent	Site	Result	Source
October 1	Hiram*	Buchtel Field; Akron, OH	W 19–0	
October 8	Ashland	Buchtel Field; Akron, OH	W 19–9	
October 15	at Case	Cleveland, OH	W 7–0	
October 22	Muskingum^{†}	Buchtel Field; Akron, OH	W 20–12	
October 29	at Mount Union	Alliance, OH	L 13–14	
November 5	at Oberlin	Oberlin, OH	L 14–19	
November 12	Baldwin–Wallace	Buchtel Field; Akron, OH	W 46–12	
November 19	Wooster	Buchtel Field; Akron, OH	L 6–13	
*Non-conference game; ^{†}Homecoming
