= 1927 Cincinnati Bearcats football team =

American college football season

1927 Cincinnati Bearcats football
- Conference: Buckeye Athletic Association, Ohio Athletic Conference
- Record: 2–5–2 (0–3–1 BAA, 0–4–2 OAC)
- Head coach: George Babcock (1st season)
- Captain: Joseph Filger
- Home stadium: Nippert Stadium

1927 Buckeye Athletic Association football standings
	Conf.					Overall
Team	W		L		T	W		L		T
Wittenberg $	4	–	0	–	0	8	–	2	–	0
Miami (OH)	3	–	1	–	0	8	–	1	–	0
Ohio	1	–	1	–	2	4	–	2	–	2
Ohio Wesleyan	1	–	2	–	1	4	–	3	–	2
Denison	1	–	3	–	0	3	–	5	–	0
Cincinnati	0	–	3	–	1	2	–	5	–	2
$ – Conference champion

1927 Ohio Athletic Conference football standings
	Conf.					Overall
Team	W		L		T	W		L		T
Miami (OH) +	7	–	1	–	0	8	–	1	–	0
Muskingum +	7	–	1	–	0	8	–	1	–	0
Oberlin	6	–	1	–	1	6	–	1	–	1
Mount Union	6	–	1	–	1	6	–	2	–	1
Wittenberg	4	–	1	–	0	8	–	2	–	0
Wooster	5	–	2	–	0	6	–	2	–	0
Dayton	2	–	1	–	0	6	–	3	–	0
Ohio	3	–	1	–	2	4	–	2	–	2
Heidelberg	4	–	2	–	0	4	–	3	–	0
Akron	4	–	3	–	0	5	–	3	–	0
Ohio Wesleyan	2	–	2	–	1	4	–	3	–	2
Denison	3	–	4	–	0	3	–	5	–	0
Marietta	2	–	3	–	1	2	–	3	–	1
Otterbein	2	–	4	–	0	2	–	4	–	1
Ohio Northern	2	–	5	–	0	3	–	6	–	0
Western Reserve	2	–	5	–	0	2	–	6	–	0
Capital	1	–	3	–	0	3	–	4	–	0
Baldwin–Wallace	2	–	6	–	0	2	–	6	–	0
Case	2	–	6	–	0	2	–	6	–	0
Cincinnati	0	–	4	–	2	2	–	5	–	2
Kenyon	1	–	5	–	0	1	–	6	–	1
Hiram	0	–	7	–	0	0	–	7	–	0
St. Xavier *	1	–	0	–	0	8	–	1	–	1
+ – Conference co-champions; * – did not compete for championship

The 1927 Cincinnati Bearcats football team was an American football team that represented the University of Cincinnati as a member of the Buckeye Athletic Association (BAA) and the Ohio Athletic Conference (OAC) during the 1927 college football season. In their first season under head coach George Babcock, the Bearcats compiled a 2–5–2 record.

== Schedule ==
Date	Opponent	Site	Result	Attendance	Source
September 24	Kentucky Wesleyan*	Nippert Stadium; Cincinnati, OH	L 0–12		
October 1	Hanover*	Nippert Stadium; Cincinnati, OH	W 35–6		
October 8	Wittenberg	Springfield, OH	L 0–45		
October 15	Dayton	Nippert Stadium; Cincinnati, OH	L 0–9	4,000	
October 22	Marietta	Nippert Stadium; Cincinnati, OH	T 6–6		
October 29	Denison	Nippert Stadium; Cincinnati, OH	L 0–3		
November 5	Transylvania*	Nippert Stadium; Cincinnati, OH	W 19–0		
November 12	Ohio	Nippert Stadium; Cincinnati, OH	T 7–7		
November 24	Miami (OH)	Nippert Stadium; Cincinnati, OH (Victory Bell)	L 14–17		
*Non-conference game
