= 1935 Toledo Rockets football team =

American college football season

1935 Toledo Rockets football
- Conference: Ohio Athletic Conference
- Record: 6–2–1 (4–1 OAC)
- Head coach: Jim Nicholson (5th season)
- Captain: Jerry Welling

1935 Ohio Athletic Conference football standings
| | Conf. | | | | | Overall |
| Team | W | | L | | T | W | | L | | T |
|---|---|---|---|---|---|---|---|---|---|---|
| Baldwin–Wallace $ | 8 | – | 0 | – | 0 | 9 | – | 1 | – | 0 |
| Mount Union | 6 | – | 1 | – | 1 | 7 | – | 1 | – | 1 |
| Toledo | 4 | – | 1 | – | 0 | 6 | – | 2 | – | 1 |
| Capital | 5 | – | 2 | – | 0 | 5 | – | 2 | – | 0 |
| Akron | 6 | – | 3 | – | 0 | 6 | – | 3 | – | 0 |
| Marietta | 4 | – | 2 | – | 0 | 4 | – | 4 | – | 0 |
| Case | 3 | – | 2 | – | 0 | 3 | – | 6 | – | 0 |
| Muskingum | 4 | – | 3 | – | 0 | 5 | – | 4 | – | 0 |
| Ohio Northern | 3 | – | 3 | – | 1 | 4 | – | 3 | – | 1 |
| Wooster | 3 | – | 3 | – | 2 | 3 | – | 4 | – | 2 |
| Kenyon | 2 | – | 2 | – | 1 | 3 | – | 3 | – | 1 |
| Denison | 3 | – | 3 | – | 0 | 4 | – | 5 | – | 0 |
| Heidelberg | 3 | – | 3 | – | 2 | 3 | – | 4 | – | 2 |
| Wittenberg | 3 | – | 3 | – | 0 | 4 | – | 5 | – | 0 |
| Oberlin | 2 | – | 2 | – | 1 | 3 | – | 4 | – | 1 |
| Kent State | 3 | – | 5 | – | 0 | 3 | – | 5 | – | 0 |
| Ashland | 2 | – | 4 | – | 1 | 2 | – | 4 | – | 1 |
| Findlay | 1 | – | 3 | – | 0 | 4 | – | 4 | – | 0 |
| Otterbein | 1 | – | 6 | – | 1 | 1 | – | 6 | – | 1 |
| Bowling Green | 1 | – | 6 | – | 0 | 1 | – | 6 | – | 0 |
| John Carroll | 0 | – | 4 | – | 0 | 1 | – | 8 | – | 0 |
| Hiram | 0 | – | 6 | – | 0 | 0 | – | 8 | – | 0 |
$ – Conference champion

The 1935 Toledo Rockets football team was an American football team that represented Toledo University (renamed the University of Toledo in 1967) in the Ohio Athletic Conference (OAC) during the 1935 college football season. In their fifth season under head coach Jim Nicholson, the team compiled a 6–2–1 record, held all opponents to 32 points, and outscored opponents by a combined total of 185 to 32. The team's victories included games against Bowling Green (63–0) and Louisville (41–7). The defense held opponents to 3.6 points per game and allowed only five touchdowns and zero passing touchdowns, each of which remains a program record. The 63-point margin of victory over Bowling Green remains the third largest in program history. The Bowling Green–Toledo football rivalry, dating back to 1919, was terminated after the 1935 season and was not revived until 1948. Jerry Welling was the team captain.

The Rockets' 13–0 victory over Dennison was the first game in program history to be broadcast on radio.

Jim Nicholson resigned as the team's head coach after the 1935 season. He became an "industrialist and civic leader" in Toledo.

== Schedule ==
| Date | Time | Opponent | Site | Result | Source |
|---|---|---|---|---|---|
| September 28 | | Capital | Toledo, OH | L 0–6 | |
| October 5 | 2:00 p.m. | at Boston University* | Nickerson Field; Weston, MA | L 0–6 | |
| October 12 | | Haskell* | Toledo, OH | T 0–0 | |
| October 19 | | at Case | Cleveland, OH | W 18–7 | |
| October 26 | | Denison | Toledo, OH | W 13–0 | |
| November 1 | | Bowling Green | Toledo, OH (rivalry) | W 63–0 | |
| November 9 | | at Louisville* | Louisville, KY | W 41–7 | |
| November 16 | | Buffalo* | Toledo, OH | W 18–6 | |
| November 23 | | Heidelberg | Toledo, OH | W 31–0 | |
*Non-conference game; All times are in Eastern time
