= 1922 University of Akron football team =

American college football season

1922 Akron football
- Conference: Ohio Athletic Conference
- Record: 5–3 (5–3 OAC)
- Head coach: Fred Sefton (8th season)
- Captain: Clarence Bliley
- Home stadium: Buchtel Field

1922 Ohio Athletic Conference football standings
	Conf.					Overall
Team	W		L		T	W		L		T
Ohio Wesleyan $	7	–	0	–	0	8	–	1	–	0
Oberlin	5	–	0	–	0	6	–	1	–	0
St. Xavier	2	–	0	–	0	7	–	2	–	0
Wooster	7	–	1	–	0	8	–	1	–	0
Ohio	3	–	1	–	0	5	–	3	–	0
Mount Union	5	–	2	–	0	6	–	2	–	1
Wittenberg	5	–	2	–	1	6	–	2	–	1
Akron	5	–	3	–	0	5	–	3	–	0
Denison	4	–	3	–	0	6	–	3	–	0
Miami (OH)	4	–	3	–	0	4	–	3	–	1
Kenyon	2	–	4	–	0	3	–	5	–	0
Western Reserve	3	–	6	–	0	3	–	7	–	0
Cincinnati	1	–	3	–	1	1	–	7	–	1
Ohio Northern	2	–	5	–	0	4	–	5	–	0
Otterbein	2	–	6	–	0	2	–	6	–	0
Case	2	–	7	–	0	2	–	8	–	0
Muskingum	1	–	4	–	0	4	–	5	–	0
Hiram	1	–	6	–	0	2	–	7	–	0
Heidelberg	1	–	6	–	0	1	–	7	–	0
$ – Conference champion

The 1922 Akron football team was an American football team that represented the University of Akron in the Ohio Athletic Conference (OAC) during the 1922 college football season. In its eighth season under head coach Fred Sefton, the team compiled a 5–3 record and outscored opponents by a total of 141 to 53. Quarterback Clarence Bliley was the team captain.

== Schedule ==
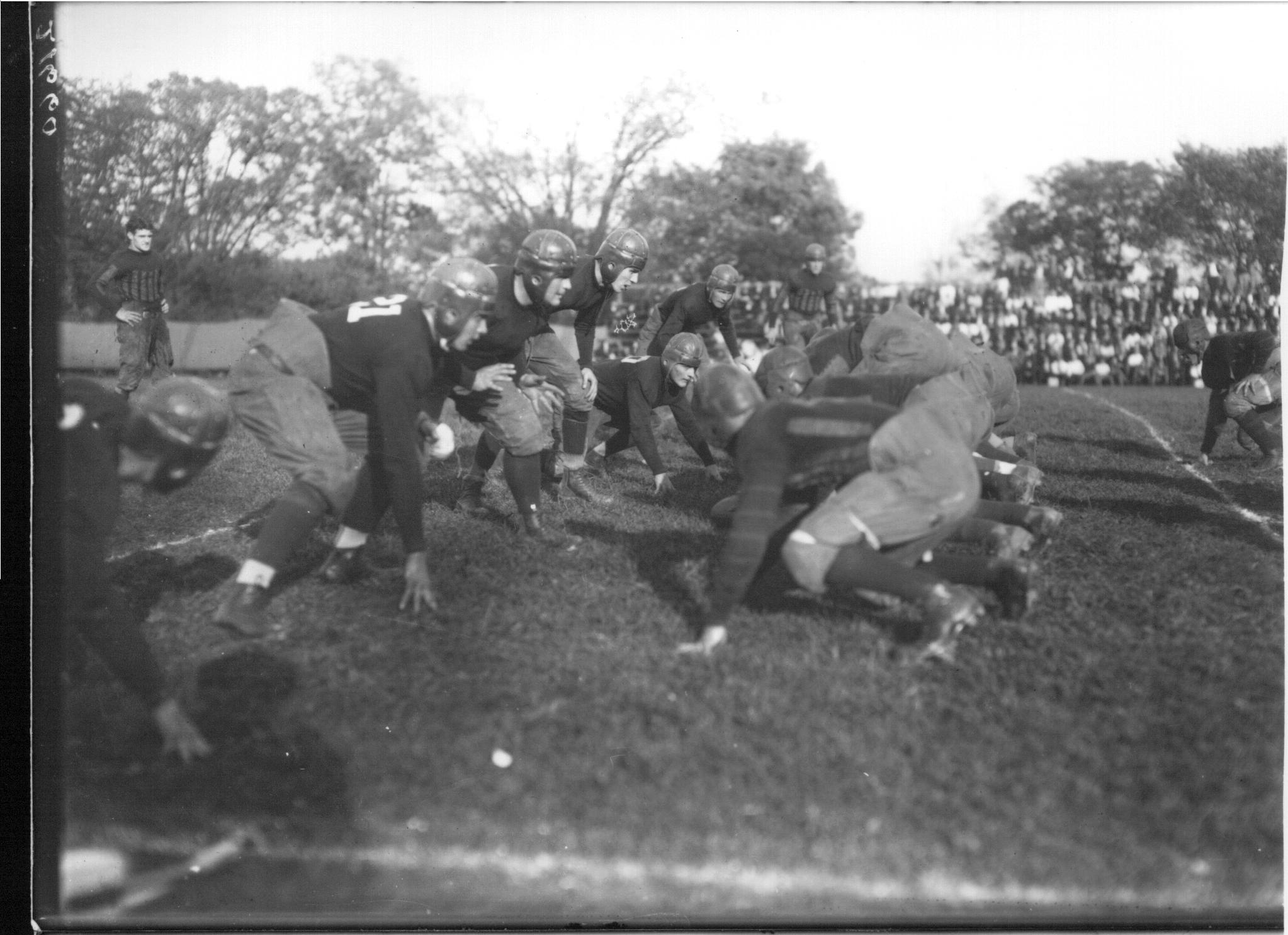
The Akron football team lining up against the 1922 Miami Redskins football team

Date	Opponent	Site	Result	Source
September 30	at Western Reserve	Cleveland, OH	W 45–0	
October 7	Wooster	Buchtel Field; Akron, OH	L 0–14	
October 14	at Miami (OH)	Miami Field; Oxford, OH	L 12–20	
October 21	Case	Buchtel Field; Akron, OH	W 12–0	
October 28	at Mount Union	Alliance, OH	L 7–13	
November 4	Ohio Northern	Buchtel Field; Akron, OH	W 21–6	
November 11	at Heidelberg	Tiffin, OH	W 19–0	
November 18	Hiram	Buchtel Field; Akron, OH	W 25–0	
