= 1922 Ohio Green and White football team =

American college football season

1922 Ohio Green and White football
- Conference: Ohio Athletic Conference
- Record: 5–3 (3–1 OAC)
- Head coach: Russ Finsterwald (3rd season)

1922 Ohio Athletic Conference football standings
	Conf.					Overall
Team	W		L		T	W		L		T
Ohio Wesleyan $	7	–	0	–	0	8	–	1	–	0
Oberlin	5	–	0	–	0	6	–	1	–	0
St. Xavier	2	–	0	–	0	7	–	2	–	0
Wooster	7	–	1	–	0	8	–	1	–	0
Ohio	3	–	1	–	0	5	–	3	–	0
Mount Union	5	–	2	–	0	6	–	2	–	1
Wittenberg	5	–	2	–	1	6	–	2	–	1
Akron	5	–	3	–	0	5	–	3	–	0
Denison	4	–	3	–	0	6	–	3	–	0
Miami (OH)	4	–	3	–	0	4	–	3	–	1
Kenyon	2	–	4	–	0	3	–	5	–	0
Western Reserve	3	–	6	–	0	3	–	7	–	0
Cincinnati	1	–	3	–	1	1	–	7	–	1
Ohio Northern	2	–	5	–	0	4	–	5	–	0
Otterbein	2	–	6	–	0	2	–	6	–	0
Case	2	–	7	–	0	2	–	8	–	0
Muskingum	1	–	4	–	0	4	–	5	–	0
Hiram	1	–	6	–	0	2	–	7	–	0
Heidelberg	1	–	6	–	0	1	–	7	–	0
$ – Conference champion

The 1922 Ohio Green and White football team represented Ohio University as a member of the Ohio Athletic Conference (OAC) during the 1922 college football season. Led by third-year head coach Russ Finsterwald, the Green and White compiled an overall record of 5–3 with a mark of 3–1 in conference play.

== Schedule ==
Date	Opponent	Site	Result	Attendance	Source
October 7	at Baldwin–Wallace*	Berea, OH	W 28–0		
October 14	Denison	Athens, OH	W 7–0		
October 21	at Western Reserve	Cleveland, OH	W 35–0		
November 4	St. Xavier	Athens, OH	L 13–7		
November 11	vs. Bethany (WV)*	Wheeling, WV	L 0–7		
November 18	Otterbein	Athens, OH	W 20–0		
November 25	at West Virginia*	WVU Athletic Field; Morgantown, WV	L 0–28	300	
November 30	at Marietta*	Marietta, OH	W 3–0		
*Non-conference game
