= 1925 Ohio Bobcats football team =

American college football season

1925 Ohio Bobcats football
- Conference: Ohio Athletic Conference
- Record: 6–2 (3–2 OAC)
- Head coach: Don Peden (2nd season)

1925 Ohio Athletic Conference football standings
	Conf.					Overall
Team	W		L		T	W		L		T
Ohio Wesleyan $	6	–	0	–	0	7	–	1	–	1
Oberlin	5	–	0	–	1	7	–	0	–	1
Wooster	5	–	1	–	0	6	–	2	–	0
Kenyon	5	–	2	–	0	6	–	2	–	0
St. Xavier	3	–	1	–	1	5	–	2	–	1
Mount Union	4	–	2	–	1	7	–	2	–	1
Baldwin–Wallace	5	–	3	–	0	5	–	3	–	0
Ohio	3	–	2	–	0	6	–	2	–	0
Miami (OH)	3	–	2	–	0	5	–	3	–	0
Muskingum	3	–	3	–	0	4	–	3	–	1
Case	3	–	4	–	2	3	–	4	–	2
Denison	3	–	4	–	0	4	–	4	–	1
Heidelberg	3	–	4	–	0	4	–	4	–	0
Cincinnati	2	–	3	–	0	4	–	5	–	0
Wittenberg	3	–	5	–	1	3	–	5	–	1
Ohio Northern	2	–	4	–	1	3	–	4	–	1
Western Reserve	2	–	5	–	0	3	–	6	–	0
Hiram	0	–	5	–	2	0	–	5	–	3
Akron	1	–	6	–	0	1	–	7	–	0
Otterbein	0	–	5	–	1	0	–	6	–	2
$ – Conference champion

The 1925 Ohio Bobcats football team was an American football team that represented Ohio University in the Ohio Athletic Conference during the 1925 college football season. In their second season under head coach Don Peden, the Bobcats compiled a 6–2 record and outscored opponents by a total of 95 to 40. Coach Peden was 26 years old during the 1925 season and remained as Ohio's head football coach through the 1946 season.

== Schedule ==
Date	Opponent	Site	Result	Attendance	Source
October 3	Rio Grande*	Athens, OH	W 19–6		
October 10	at Denison	Granville, OH	W 26–0		
October 17	at Toledo*	Toledo, OH	W 7–0		
October 24	Ohio Wesleyan	Athens, OH	L 0–26		
October 31	at Ohio Northern	Ada, OH	L 0–6		
November 7	Marietta*	Athens, OH	W 10–0		
November 14	Cincinnati	Nippert Stadium; Cincinnati, OH	W 13–2	7,000	
November 20	Wittenberg	Athens, OH	W 20–0		
*Non-conference game
