= 1935 Bowling Green Falcons football team =

American college football season

1935 Bowling Green Falcons football
- Conference: Ohio Athletic Conference
- Record: 1–6 (1–6 OAC)
- Head coach: Harry Ockerman (1st season)
- Captain: Jim Greetham

1935 Ohio Athletic Conference football standings
	Conf.					Overall
Team	W		L		T	W		L		T
Baldwin–Wallace $	8	–	0	–	0	9	–	1	–	0
Mount Union	6	–	1	–	1	7	–	1	–	1
Toledo	4	–	1	–	0	6	–	2	–	1
Capital	5	–	2	–	0	5	–	2	–	0
Akron	6	–	3	–	0	6	–	3	–	0
Marietta	4	–	2	–	0	4	–	4	–	0
Case	3	–	2	–	0	3	–	6	–	0
Muskingum	4	–	3	–	0	5	–	4	–	0
Ohio Northern	3	–	3	–	1	4	–	3	–	1
Wooster	3	–	3	–	2	3	–	4	–	2
Kenyon	2	–	2	–	1	3	–	3	–	1
Denison	3	–	3	–	0	4	–	5	–	0
Heidelberg	3	–	3	–	2	3	–	4	–	2
Wittenberg	3	–	3	–	0	4	–	5	–	0
Oberlin	2	–	2	–	1	3	–	4	–	1
Kent State	3	–	5	–	0	3	–	5	–	0
Ashland	2	–	4	–	1	2	–	4	–	1
Findlay	1	–	3	–	0	4	–	4	–	0
Otterbein	1	–	6	–	1	1	–	6	–	1
Bowling Green	1	–	6	–	0	1	–	6	–	0
John Carroll	0	–	4	–	0	1	–	8	–	0
Hiram	0	–	6	–	0	0	–	8	–	0
$ – Conference champion

The 1935 Bowling Green Falcons football team, sometimes known as the "Bee Gees", was an American football team that represented Bowling Green State College (later renamed Bowling Green State University) in the Ohio Athletic Conference (OAC) during the 1935 college football season. In their first season under head coach Harry Ockerman, the Falcons compiled an overall record of 1–6 record with an identical mark in conference play, tying for 19th place in the OAC. Bowling Green was shut out in its first six games, and was outscored in all games by a total of 246 to 25. Jim Greetham was the team captain.

== Schedule ==
Date	Opponent	Site	Result	Attendance	Source
October 5	Capital	Bowling Green, OH	L 0–12		
October 12	Baldwin–Wallace	Bowling Green, OH	L 0–41		
October 19	at Ohio Northern	Ada, OH	L 0–54		
October 26	at Kent State	Kent, OH (rivalry)	L 0–45		
November 1	at Toledo	Toledo, OH (rivalry)	L 0–63		
November 9	Marietta^{†}	Bowling Green, OH	L 0–31	1,500	
November 16	Hiram	Bowling Green, OH	W 25–0		
^{†}Homecoming
