= 1911 Cincinnati football team =

American college football season

1911 Cincinnati football
- Conference: Ohio Athletic Conference
- Record: 6–2–1 (2–1–1 OAC)
- Head coach: Robert Burch (3rd season)
- Captain: Walter Heuck
- Home stadium: Carson Field

1911 Ohio Athletic Conference football standings
	Conf.					Overall
Team	W		L		T	W		L		T
Oberlin $	4	–	0	–	1	6	–	1	–	1
Case	5	–	1	–	1	5	–	2	–	1
Ohio Wesleyan	6	–	2	–	0	6	–	3	–	0
Ohio State	4	–	1	–	2	5	–	3	–	2
Cincinnati	2	–	1	–	1	6	–	2	–	1
Denison	3	–	2	–	2	6	–	2	–	2
Western Reserve	1	–	3	–	2	4	–	3	–	4
Ohio	1	–	2	–	0	3	–	3	–	2
Miami (OH)	1	–	3	–	1	2	–	4	–	2
Wittenberg	1	–	4	–	0	3	–	6	–	0
Kenyon	0	–	6	–	0	1	–	7	–	1
Wooster	0	–	4	–	0	0	–	6	–	0
$ – Conference champion

The 1911 Cincinnati football team was an American football team that represented the University of Cincinnati as a member of the Ohio Athletic Conference (OAC) during the 1911 college football season. Led by Robert Burch in his third and final season as head coach, Cincinnati compiled an overall record of 6–2–1 with a mark of 2–1–1 in conference play, placing fifth in the OAC. Walter Heuck was the team captain. The team played home games at Carson Field in Cincinnati.

== Schedule ==
Date	Time	Opponent	Site	Result	Source
October 7	2:30 p.m.	Transylvania*	Carson Field; Cincinnati, OH	W 16–0	
October 14		Earlham*	Reid Field; Richmond, IN	L 0–9	
October 21	2:30 p.m.	Otterbein*	Carson Field; Cincinnati, OH	W 16–3	
October 28	2:30 p.m.	at Kentucky State College*	Stoll Field; Lexington, KY	W 6–0	
November 4		Butler*	Carson Field; Cincinnati, OH	W 23–11	
November 11	2:30 p.m.	Denison	Carson Field; Cincinnati, OH	T 0–0	
November 18		Miami (OH)	Carson Field; Cincinnati, OH (Victory Bell)	W 11–0	
November 25	2:30 p.m.	Wittenberg	Carson Field; Cincinnati, OH	W 5–0	
November 30	10:00 a.m.	Ohio State	Carson Field; Cincinnati, OH	L 6–11	
*Non-conference game
