= 1925 Cincinnati Bearcats football team =

American college football season

1925 Cincinnati Bearcats football
- Conference: Ohio Athletic Conference
- Record: 4–5 (2–3 OAC)
- Head coach: George McLaren (4th season)
- Captain: John Pease
- Home stadium: Nippert Stadium

1925 Ohio Athletic Conference football standings
	Conf.					Overall
Team	W		L		T	W		L		T
Ohio Wesleyan $	6	–	0	–	0	7	–	1	–	1
Oberlin	5	–	0	–	1	7	–	0	–	1
Wooster	5	–	1	–	0	6	–	2	–	0
Kenyon	5	–	2	–	0	6	–	2	–	0
St. Xavier	3	–	1	–	1	5	–	2	–	1
Mount Union	4	–	2	–	1	7	–	2	–	1
Baldwin–Wallace	5	–	3	–	0	5	–	3	–	0
Ohio	3	–	2	–	0	6	–	2	–	0
Miami (OH)	3	–	2	–	0	5	–	3	–	0
Muskingum	3	–	3	–	0	4	–	3	–	1
Case	3	–	4	–	2	3	–	4	–	2
Denison	3	–	4	–	0	4	–	4	–	1
Heidelberg	3	–	4	–	0	4	–	4	–	0
Cincinnati	2	–	3	–	0	4	–	5	–	0
Wittenberg	3	–	5	–	1	3	–	5	–	1
Ohio Northern	2	–	4	–	1	3	–	4	–	1
Western Reserve	2	–	5	–	0	3	–	6	–	0
Hiram	0	–	5	–	2	0	–	5	–	3
Akron	1	–	6	–	0	1	–	7	–	0
Otterbein	0	–	5	–	1	0	–	6	–	2
$ – Conference champion

The 1925 Cincinnati Bearcats football team was an American football team that represented the University of Cincinnati as a member of the Ohio Athletic Conference (OAC) during 1925 college football season. In its fourth season under head coach George McLaren, the team compiled a 4–5 record (2–3 against OAC opponents).

== Schedule ==
Date	Opponent	Site	Result	Attendance	Source
September 26	Transylvania	Nippert Stadium; Cincinnati, OH	L 15–21		
October 3	Hanover	Nippert Stadium; Cincinnati, OH	W 12–0		
October 10	Georgetown (KY)	Nippert Stadium; Cincinnati, OH	W 12–6		
October 16	at Otterbein	Westerville, OH	W 6–0		
October 24	Denison	Nippert Stadium; Cincinnati, OH	L 12–24		
October 31	Dayton	Nippert Stadium; Cincinnati, OH	L 0–23		
November 7	at Wittenberg	Wittenberg Field; Springfield, OH	W 6–2		
November 14	Ohio	Nippert Stadium; Cincinnati, OH	L 2–13	7,000	
November 26	Miami (OH)	Nippert Stadium; Cincinnati, OH	L 0–33	> 13,000	
