= 1921 St. Xavier Saints football team =

American college football season

1921 St. Xavier Saints football
- Conference: Ohio Athletic Conference
- Record: 6–2 (1–0 OAC)
- Head coach: Joseph A. Meyer (2nd season)

1921 Ohio Athletic Conference football standings
	Conf.					Overall
Team	W		L		T	W		L		T
Miami (OH) $	7	–	0	–	0	8	–	0	–	0
St. Xavier	1	–	0	–	0	6	–	2	–	0
Oberlin	7	–	0	–	1	7	–	0	–	1
Case	6	–	1	–	2	6	–	2	–	2
Wooster	6	–	2	–	0	6	–	2	–	0
Denison	5	–	2	–	0	5	–	3	–	0
Akron	4	–	3	–	0	5	–	3	–	0
Ohio Northern	4	–	3	–	0	5	–	4	–	0
Ohio State	1	–	1	–	0	5	–	2	–	0
Wittenberg	3	–	3	–	2	4	–	3	–	2
Kenyon	1	–	1	–	4	1	–	1	–	5
Ohio	1	–	1	–	0	4	–	4	–	1
Otterbein	1	–	3	–	2	1	–	5	–	2
Western Reserve	2	–	5	–	1	2	–	7	–	1
Hiram	1	–	4	–	2	2	–	4	–	2
Ohio Wesleyan	1	–	6	–	1	1	–	6	–	1
Mount Union	0	–	5	–	1	1	–	6	–	1
Cincinnati	0	–	4	–	0	3	–	6	–	0
Heidelberg	0	–	7	–	0	0	–	7	–	1
$ – Conference champion

The 1921 St. Xavier Musketeers football team was an American football team that represented St. Xavier College (later renamed Xavier University) as in the Ohio Athletic Conference (OAC) during the 1921 college football season. In its second season under head coach Joseph A. Meyer, the team compiled a 6–2 record and outscored opponents by a total of 171 to 49.

== Schedule ==
Date	Opponent	Site	Result	Source
October 1	Morris Harvey*	Corcoran Field; Cincinnati, OH	W 21–7	
October 8	at Dayton*	Varsity Field; Dayton, OH	W 13–0	
October 15	Centre*	Corcoran Field; Cincinnati, OH	L 6–28	
October 22	Rose Polytechnic*	Corcoran Field; Cincinnati, OH	W 49–0	
October 29	Creighton*	Corcoran Field; Cincinnati, OH	L 7–14	
November 5	St. Ignatius (OH)*	Corcoran Field; Cincinnati, OH	W 28–0	
November 12	at Hanover*	Hanover, IN	W 34–0	
November 19	Ohio Northern	Corcoran Field; Cincinnati, OH	W 13–0	
*Non-conference game
