= 1935 Akron Zippers football team =

American college football season

1935 Akron Zippers football
- Conference: Ohio Athletic Conference
- Record: 6–3 (6–3 OAC)
- Head coach: Red Blair (9th season)
- Captain: Earl Hensal
- Home stadium: Buchtel Field

1935 Ohio Athletic Conference football standings
	Conf.					Overall
Team	W		L		T	W		L		T
Baldwin–Wallace $	8	–	0	–	0	9	–	1	–	0
Mount Union	6	–	1	–	1	7	–	1	–	1
Toledo	4	–	1	–	0	6	–	2	–	1
Capital	5	–	2	–	0	5	–	2	–	0
Akron	6	–	3	–	0	6	–	3	–	0
Marietta	4	–	2	–	0	4	–	4	–	0
Case	3	–	2	–	0	3	–	6	–	0
Muskingum	4	–	3	–	0	5	–	4	–	0
Ohio Northern	3	–	3	–	1	4	–	3	–	1
Wooster	3	–	3	–	2	3	–	4	–	2
Kenyon	2	–	2	–	1	3	–	3	–	1
Denison	3	–	3	–	0	4	–	5	–	0
Heidelberg	3	–	3	–	2	3	–	4	–	2
Wittenberg	3	–	3	–	0	4	–	5	–	0
Oberlin	2	–	2	–	1	3	–	4	–	1
Kent State	3	–	5	–	0	3	–	5	–	0
Ashland	2	–	4	–	1	2	–	4	–	1
Findlay	1	–	3	–	0	4	–	4	–	0
Otterbein	1	–	6	–	1	1	–	6	–	1
Bowling Green	1	–	6	–	0	1	–	6	–	0
John Carroll	0	–	4	–	0	1	–	8	–	0
Hiram	0	–	6	–	0	0	–	8	–	0
$ – Conference champion

The 1935 Akron Zippers football team was an American football team that represented the University of Akron in the Ohio Athletic Conference (OAC) during the 1935 college football season. In its ninth and final season under head coach Red Blair, the team compiled a 6–3 record (6–3 in conference), finished fourth in the OAC, and outscored opponents by a total of 81 to 70. Right guard Earl Hensal was the team captain.

== Schedule ==
Date	Opponent	Site	Result	Attendance	Source
September 27	Findlay	Buchtel Field; Akron, OH	W 19–6		
October 4	Otterbein	Buchtel Field; Akron, OH	W 26–0		
October 11	Kent State	Buchtel Field; Akron, OH (rivalry)	W 3–0	3,000	
October 19	Wooster	Buchtel Field; Akron, OH	L 0–7		
October 25	at John Carroll	Cleveland Municipal Stadium; Cleveland, OH	W 7–6		
November 9	Heidelberg	Buchtel Field; Akron, OH	W 7–6		
November 16	Muskingum	Buchtel Field; Akron, OH	L 0–19		
November 23	at Mount Union	Alliance, OH	W 13–0		
November 28	Baldwin–Wallace	Buchtel Field; Akron, OH	L 6–26	5,300	
