= 1925 Miami Redskins football team =

American college football season

1925 Miami Redskins football
- Conference: Ohio Athletic Conference
- Record: 5–3 (3–2 OAC)
- Head coach: Chester Pittser (2nd season)
- Captain: Tom Sharkey
- Home stadium: Miami Field

1925 Ohio Athletic Conference football standings
	Conf.					Overall
Team	W		L		T	W		L		T
Ohio Wesleyan $	6	–	0	–	0	7	–	1	–	1
Oberlin	5	–	0	–	1	7	–	0	–	1
Wooster	5	–	1	–	0	6	–	2	–	0
Kenyon	5	–	2	–	0	6	–	2	–	0
St. Xavier	3	–	1	–	1	5	–	2	–	1
Mount Union	4	–	2	–	1	7	–	2	–	1
Baldwin–Wallace	5	–	3	–	0	5	–	3	–	0
Ohio	3	–	2	–	0	6	–	2	–	0
Miami (OH)	3	–	2	–	0	5	–	3	–	0
Muskingum	3	–	3	–	0	4	–	3	–	1
Case	3	–	4	–	2	3	–	4	–	2
Denison	3	–	4	–	0	4	–	4	–	1
Heidelberg	3	–	4	–	0	4	–	4	–	0
Cincinnati	2	–	3	–	0	4	–	5	–	0
Wittenberg	3	–	5	–	1	3	–	5	–	1
Ohio Northern	2	–	4	–	1	3	–	4	–	1
Western Reserve	2	–	5	–	0	3	–	6	–	0
Hiram	0	–	5	–	2	0	–	5	–	3
Akron	1	–	6	–	0	1	–	7	–	0
Otterbein	0	–	5	–	1	0	–	6	–	2
$ – Conference champion

The 1925 Miami Redskins football team was an American football team that represented Miami University in the Ohio Athletic Conference (OAC) during the 1925 college football season. In its second season under head coach Chester Pittser, Miami compiled a 5–3 record (3–2 against OAC opponents), shut out four of eight opponents, and outscored all opponents by a total of 120 to 55. Tom Sharkey was the team captain.

== Schedule ==
Date	Opponent	Site	Result	Attendance	Source
October 3	Georgetown (KY)*	Miami Field; Oxford, OH	W 19–0		
October 10	Wittenberg	Miami Field; Oxford, OH	W 30–0		
October 17	Transylvania*	Miami Field; Oxford, OH	W 16–0		
October 24	at Indiana*	Memorial Stadium; Bloomington, IN	L 7–25		
October 31	vs. Denison	Athletic Park; Dayton, OH	L 0–6	10,000	
November 7	at Mount Union	Alliance, OH	W 8–6		
November 14	Oberlin^{†}	Miami Field; Oxford, OH	L 7–18		
November 26	at Cincinnati	Nippert Stadium; Cincinnati, OH (Victory Bell)	W 33–0	> 13,000	
*Non-conference game; ^{†}Homecoming
