= 1911 Ohio State Buckeyes football team =

American college football season

1911 Ohio State Buckeyes football
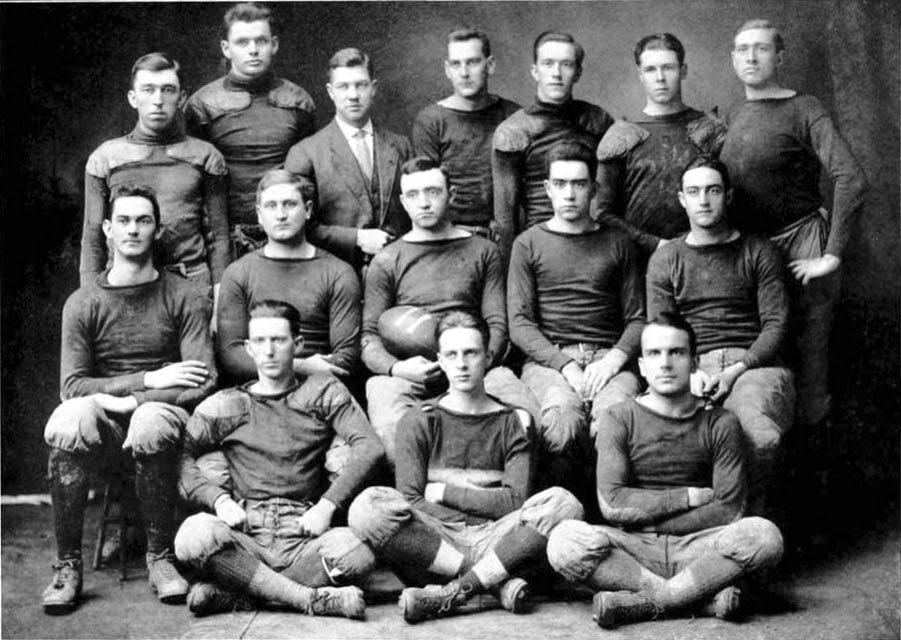
- Conference: Ohio Athletic Conference
- Record: 5–3–2 (4–1–2 OAC)
- Head coach: Harry Vaughan (1st season)
- Home stadium: Ohio Field

1911 Ohio Athletic Conference football standings
	Conf.					Overall
Team	W		L		T	W		L		T
Oberlin $	4	–	0	–	1	6	–	1	–	1
Case	5	–	1	–	1	5	–	2	–	1
Ohio Wesleyan	6	–	2	–	0	6	–	3	–	0
Ohio State	4	–	1	–	2	5	–	3	–	2
Cincinnati	2	–	1	–	1	6	–	2	–	1
Denison	3	–	2	–	2	6	–	2	–	2
Western Reserve	1	–	3	–	2	4	–	3	–	4
Ohio	1	–	2	–	0	3	–	3	–	2
Miami (OH)	1	–	3	–	1	2	–	4	–	2
Wittenberg	1	–	4	–	0	3	–	6	–	0
Kenyon	0	–	6	–	0	1	–	7	–	1
Wooster	0	–	4	–	0	0	–	6	–	0
$ – Conference champion

The 1911 Ohio State Buckeyes football team was an American football team that represented Ohio State University during the 1911 college football season. In their first season under head coach Harry Vaughan, the Buckeyes compiled a 5–3–2 record and outscored their opponents by a combined total of 47 to 42.

== Schedule ==
Date	Time	Opponent	Site	Result	Source
September 30		Otterbein*	Ohio Field; Columbus, OH	W 6–0	
October 7		Miami (OH)	Ohio Field; Columbus, OH	W 3–0	
October 14		Western Reserve	Ohio Field; Columbus, OH	T 0–0	
October 21		at Michigan*	Ferry Field; Ann Arbor, MI (rivalry)	L 0–19	
October 28		Ohio Wesleyan	Ohio Field; Columbus, OH	W 3–0	
November 4		Case	Ohio Field; Columbus, OH	L 0–9	
November 11		Kenyon	Ohio Field; Columbus, OH	W 24–0	
November 18		at Oberlin	Oberlin, OH	T 0–0	
November 25		Syracuse*	Ohio Field; Columbus, OH	L 0–6	
November 30	10:00 a.m.	Cincinnati	Ohio Field; Columbus, OH	W 11–6	
*Non-conference game
