= 1921 Ohio Green and White football team =

American college football season

1921 Ohio Green and White football
- Conference: Ohio Athletic Conference
- Record: 4–4–1 (1–1 OAC)
- Head coach: Russ Finsterwald (2nd season)

1921 Ohio Athletic Conference football standings
	Conf.					Overall
Team	W		L		T	W		L		T
Miami (OH) $	7	–	0	–	0	8	–	0	–	0
St. Xavier	1	–	0	–	0	6	–	2	–	0
Oberlin	7	–	0	–	1	7	–	0	–	1
Case	6	–	1	–	2	6	–	2	–	2
Wooster	6	–	2	–	0	6	–	2	–	0
Denison	5	–	2	–	0	5	–	3	–	0
Akron	4	–	3	–	0	5	–	3	–	0
Ohio Northern	4	–	3	–	0	5	–	4	–	0
Ohio State	1	–	1	–	0	5	–	2	–	0
Wittenberg	3	–	3	–	2	4	–	3	–	2
Kenyon	1	–	1	–	4	1	–	1	–	5
Ohio	1	–	1	–	0	4	–	4	–	1
Otterbein	1	–	3	–	2	1	–	5	–	2
Western Reserve	2	–	5	–	1	2	–	7	–	1
Hiram	1	–	4	–	2	2	–	4	–	2
Ohio Wesleyan	1	–	6	–	1	1	–	6	–	1
Mount Union	0	–	5	–	1	1	–	6	–	1
Cincinnati	0	–	4	–	0	3	–	6	–	0
Heidelberg	0	–	7	–	0	0	–	7	–	1
$ – Conference champion

The 1921 Ohio Green and White football team represented Ohio University as a member of the Ohio Athletic Conference (OAC) during the 1921 college football season. Led by second-year head coach Russ Finsterwald, the Green and White compiled an overall record of 4–4–1 with a mark of 1–1 in conference play.

== Schedule ==
Date	Opponent	Site	Result	Attendance	Source
September 24	Morris Harvey*	Athens, OH	W 40–0		
October 1	at Syracuse*	Archbold Stadium; Syracuse, NY	L 0–38	12,000	
October 8	at Bethany (WV)*	High School field; Bethany, WV	L 0–13		
October 15	at West Virginia*	Morgantown, WV	L 0–7		
October 22	at Denison	Granville, OH	L 7–14		
October 29	Baldwin–Wallace*	Athens, OH	W 35–0		
November 5	Cincinnati	Athens, OH	W 7–6		
November 12	at Columbia*	South Field; New York, NY	W 23–21		
November 24	Marietta*	Athens, OH	T 0–0		
*Non-conference game
