= 1911 Miami Redskins football team =

American college football season

1911 Miami Redskins football
- Conference: Ohio Athletic Conference
- Record: 2–4–2 (1–3–1 OAC)
- Head coach: Edwin Sweetland (1st season)
- Home stadium: Miami Field

1911 Ohio Athletic Conference football standings
	Conf.					Overall
Team	W		L		T	W		L		T
Oberlin $	4	–	0	–	1	6	–	1	–	1
Case	5	–	1	–	1	5	–	2	–	1
Ohio Wesleyan	6	–	2	–	0	6	–	3	–	0
Ohio State	4	–	1	–	2	5	–	3	–	2
Cincinnati	2	–	1	–	1	6	–	2	–	1
Denison	3	–	2	–	2	6	–	2	–	2
Western Reserve	1	–	3	–	2	4	–	3	–	4
Ohio	1	–	2	–	0	3	–	3	–	2
Miami (OH)	1	–	3	–	1	2	–	4	–	2
Wittenberg	1	–	4	–	0	3	–	6	–	0
Kenyon	0	–	6	–	0	1	–	7	–	1
Wooster	0	–	4	–	0	0	–	6	–	0
$ – Conference champion

The 1911 Miami Redskins football team was an American football team that represented Miami University as a member of the Ohio Athletic Conference (OAC) during the 1911 college football season. Led by coach Edwin Sweetland in his first and only year, Miami compiled a 2–4–2 record. The prior season's coach, Harold Iddings, replaced Sweetland as basketball coach at Kentucky. Sweetland was the last head coach to leave Miami with a losing record until 1989 when Tim Rose's contract was not renewed.

== Schedule ==
Date	Opponent	Site	Result	Source
October 2	Wilmington OH)	Lexington, KY	W 35–2	
October 9	at Ohio State	Ohio Field; Columbus, OH	L 0–3	
October 14	Kentucky State College	Oxford, OH	L 0–12	
October 21	at Wittenberg	Springfield, OH	W 6–3	
November 4	at Ohio Wesleyan	Delaware, OH	L 0–11	
November 11	at DePauw	Greencastle, IN	T 0–0	
November 18	at Cincinnati	Carson Field; Cincinnati, OH (Victory Bell)	L 0–11	
November 25	Western Reserve	Oxford, OH	T 5–5	
