= 1921 University of Akron football team =

American college football season

1921 Akron football
- Conference: Ohio Athletic Conference
- Record: 5–3 (4–3 OAC)
- Head coach: Fred Sefton (7th season)
- Captain: Herman Eckert
- Home stadium: Buchtel Field

1921 Ohio Athletic Conference football standings
	Conf.					Overall
Team	W		L		T	W		L		T
Miami (OH) $	7	–	0	–	0	8	–	0	–	0
St. Xavier	1	–	0	–	0	6	–	2	–	0
Oberlin	7	–	0	–	1	7	–	0	–	1
Case	6	–	1	–	2	6	–	2	–	2
Wooster	6	–	2	–	0	6	–	2	–	0
Denison	5	–	2	–	0	5	–	3	–	0
Akron	4	–	3	–	0	5	–	3	–	0
Ohio Northern	4	–	3	–	0	5	–	4	–	0
Ohio State	1	–	1	–	0	5	–	2	–	0
Wittenberg	3	–	3	–	2	4	–	3	–	2
Kenyon	1	–	1	–	4	1	–	1	–	5
Ohio	1	–	1	–	0	4	–	4	–	1
Otterbein	1	–	3	–	2	1	–	5	–	2
Western Reserve	2	–	5	–	1	2	–	7	–	1
Hiram	1	–	4	–	2	2	–	4	–	2
Ohio Wesleyan	1	–	6	–	1	1	–	6	–	1
Mount Union	0	–	5	–	1	1	–	6	–	1
Cincinnati	0	–	4	–	0	3	–	6	–	0
Heidelberg	0	–	7	–	0	0	–	7	–	1
$ – Conference champion

The 1921 Akron football team represented the University of Akron in the 1921 college football season as a part of the Ohio Athletic Conference (OAC). The team was led by seventh-year head coach Fred Sefton. Akron outscored their opponents by a total of 117–69 and finished with a 5–3 record.

== Schedule ==
Date	Opponent	Site	Result
	Western Reserve	Buchtel Field; Akron, OH	W 14–7
	Case	Buchtel Field; Akron, OH	L 0–14
	at Hiram	Hiram, OH	L 0–6
	Heidelberg	Buchtel Field; Akron, OH	W 14–0
	Ohio Northern	Buchtel Field; Akron, OH	W 26–7
	Mount Union	Buchtel Field; Akron, OH	W 28–14
	Muskingum*	Buchtel Field; Akron, OH	W 35–8
	at Wooster	Wooster, OH	L 0–13
*Non-conference game
