= 1911 Missouri Tigers football team =

American college football season

1911 Missouri Tigers football
- Conference: Missouri Valley Conference
- Record: 2–4–2 (0–2–2 MVC)
- Head coach: Chester Brewer (1st season)
- Captain: Glen B. Shuck
- Home stadium: Rollins Field

1911 Missouri Valley Conference football standings
	Conf.					Overall
Team	W		L		T	W		L		T
Iowa State +	2	–	0	–	1	6	–	1	–	1
Nebraska +	2	–	0	–	1	5	–	1	–	2
Kansas	1	–	1	–	1	4	–	2	–	2
Washington University	0	–	0	–	2	4	–	2	–	2
Missouri	0	–	2	–	2	2	–	4	–	2
Drake	0	–	2	–	1	5	–	2	–	1
+ – Conference co-champions

The 1911 Missouri Tigers football team was an American football team that represented the University of Missouri in the Missouri Valley Conference (MVC) during the 1911 college football season. The team compiled a 2–4–2 record (2–1–1 against MVC opponents), finished in fifth place in the conference, and was outscored by all opponents by a combined total of 67 to 61. Chester Brewer was the head coach for his first of three seasons. The team played its home games at Rollins Field in Columbia, Missouri.

== Schedule ==
Date	Time	Opponent	Site	Result	Attendance	Source
September 30		William Jewell*	Rollins Field; Columbia, MO	W 15–0		
October 7		Missouri Mines*	Rollins Field; Columbia, MO	W 29–0		
October 21		at Iowa State	State Field; Ames, IA (rivalry)	L 3–6		
October 28		at Nebraska	Nebraska Field; Lincoln, NE (rivalry)	L 0–34		
November 4		Oklahoma*	Rollins Field; Columbia, MO (rivalry)	L 6–14		
November 11	2:45 p.m.	at Washington University	Francis Field; St. Louis, MO	T 5–5	10,000–12,000	
November 18	2:30 p.m.	at Saint Louis*	University campus; St. Louis, MO	L 0–5	7,500	
November 25		Kansas^{†}	Rollins Field; Columbia, MO (first college football homecoming game, rivalry)	T 3–3	8,000	
*Non-conference game; ^{†}Homecoming
