= 1911 Kansas Jayhawks football team =

American college football season

1911 Kansas Jayhawks football
- Conference: Missouri Valley Conference
- Record: 4–2–2 (1–1–1 MVC)
- Head coach: Ralph W. Sherwin (1st season)
- Captain: Earl Ammons
- Home stadium: McCook Field

1911 Missouri Valley Conference football standings
	Conf.					Overall
Team	W		L		T	W		L		T
Iowa State +	2	–	0	–	1	6	–	1	–	1
Nebraska +	2	–	0	–	1	5	–	1	–	2
Kansas	1	–	1	–	1	4	–	2	–	2
Washington University	0	–	0	–	2	4	–	2	–	2
Missouri	0	–	2	–	2	2	–	4	–	2
Drake	0	–	2	–	1	5	–	2	–	1
+ – Conference co-champions

The 1911 Kansas Jayhawks football team was an American football team that represented the University of Kansas as a member of the Missouri Valley Conference (MVC) during the 1911 college football season. In their first and only season under head coach Ralph W. Sherwin, the Jayhawks compiled a 4–2–2 record (1–1–1 against conference opponents), finished in third place in the MVC, and outscored opponents by a total of 81 to 44. The Jayhawks played their home games at McCook Field in Lawrence, Kansas. Earl Ammons was the team captain.

== Schedule ==
Date	Opponent	Site	Result	Attendance	Source
October 7	Baker*	McCook Field; Lawrence, Kansas	T 0–0	2,500	
October 14	St. Mary's (Kansas)*	McCook Field; Lawrence, Kansas	W 46–0	2,000	
October 21	at Kansas State*	Ahearn Field; Manhattan, Kansas (rivalry)	W 6–0	2,200	
October 28	Drake	McCook Field; Lawrence, Kansas	W 11–3		
November 4	at Washburn*	Topeka, Kansas	W 14–6		
November 11	Oklahoma*	McCook Field; Lawrence, Kansas	L 0–3	1,500	
November 18	Nebraska	McCook Field; Lawrence, Kansas (rivalry)	L 0–29	7,000	
November 25	at Missouri	Rollins Field; Columbia, Missouri (first college football homecoming game, rivalry)	T 3–3	8,000	
*Non-conference game
