= Rock chalk =

Rock chalk may refer to:

- Chalk – commonly found carbonate rock (as opposed to gypsum sidewalk chalk)
- Rock Chalk, Jayhawk – a chant used at University of Kansas Jayhawks sporting events
