= Rock Chalk, Jayhawk =

Chant associated with the University of Kansas Jayhawks

"Rock Chalk, Jayhawk" (a.k.a. the Rock Chalk chant) is a chant used at University of Kansas Jayhawks sporting events. The chant is made up of the phrase "Rock chalk, Jayhawk, KU".

== History ==
The chant was first adopted by the university's science club in 1886. Chemistry professor E.H.S. Bailey and his colleagues were returning by train to Lawrence after a conference. During their travel, they discussed a need of a rousing yell. They came up with "Rah, Rah, Jayhawk, Go KU", repeated three times.

By 1889, "Rock Chalk" had replaced the “Rah, Rah!” Rock Chalk is a transposition of “chalk rock,” a type of limestone that exists in the Cretaceous-age bedrocks of central and western parts of the state and which is similar to the coccolith-bearing chalk of the white cliffs of Dover. (The University itself is located on top of Mount Oread, a ridge of flinty Carboniferous limestone used in some of the buildings.) Those responsible for the change are unknown, with Bailey himself crediting the geology department, and others an English professor.

Kansas troops used it in the Philippine–American War in 1899, the Boxer Rebellion, and World War II. In the 1911 Border War football game, over 1,000 fans gathered in downtown Lawrence to listen to a "broadcast" of the game by telegraph and participated in cheers including the Rock Chalk.

In the 1920 Summer Olympics, Albert I of Belgium asked for a typical American college yell, and gathered athletes replied with the chant.

Former United States President Theodore Roosevelt reportedly called the Rock Chalk chant the best college chant he ever heard.

== Usage ==
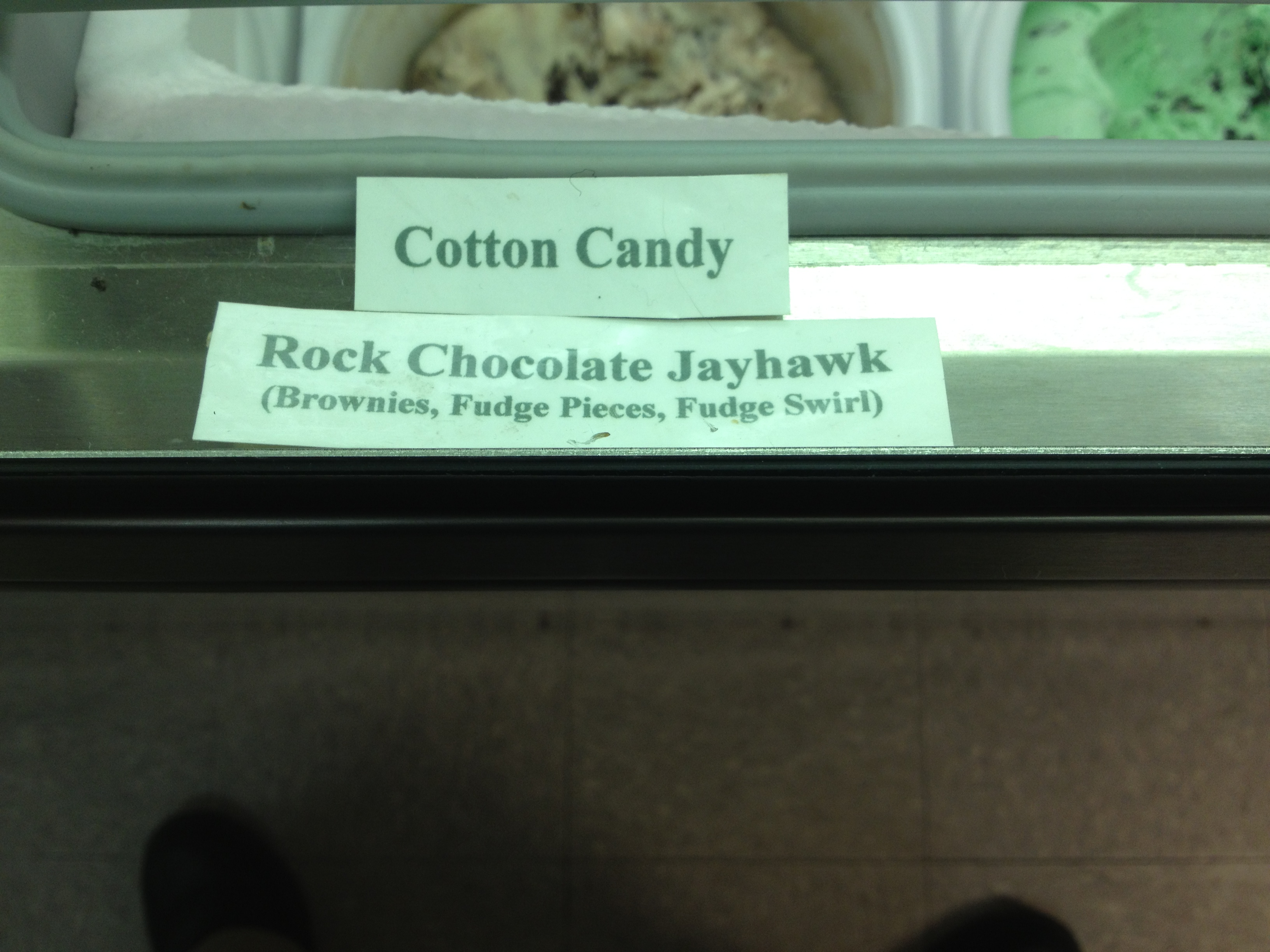
Fans have used the phrase "Rock Chalk" in creative ways, such as Rock "Chocolate" Jayhawk ice cream.

It is best known as being loudly chanted at basketball games at Allen Fieldhouse and football games at University of Kansas Memorial Stadium. During pregame, the refrain of "Rock chalk... Jay-Hawk... KU," is repeated twice slowly, and then three times quickly. It is usually preceded by the Kansas alma mater "Crimson and the Blue,” and followed by the fight song, "I'm a Jayhawk.” Since the early 1990s, Kansas fans have been known to do the slow repetition of "Rock chalk... Jay-Hawk... KU" when the Jayhawks are believed to be safely ahead, and victory is guaranteed.
