= Ralph W. Sherwin =

American football player and coach (1888–1963)

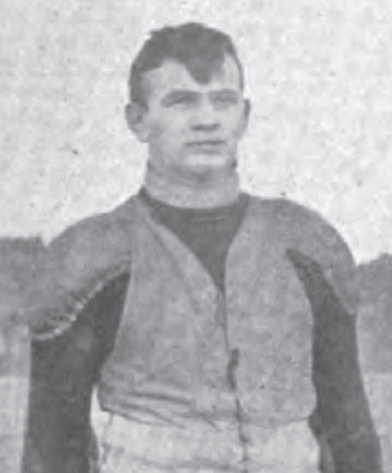
- Sherwin at Dartmouth in 1908

Biographical details
- Born: January 31, 1888; Fitchburg, Massachusetts, U.S.
- Died: May 17, 1963 (aged 75); Dover, New Hampshire, U.S.

Playing career
- 1908–1911: Dartmouth
- Position: Left tackle

Coaching career (HC unless noted)
- 1911: Kansas

Head coaching record
- Overall: 4–2–2

Ralph Waldo Sherwin (January 31, 1888 – May 17, 1963) was an American football player and coach. He played college football at Dartmouth College, playing left tackle. He served as the 14th head coach at the University of Kansas for a single season in 1911, compiling a record of 4–2–2. Sherwin was the head coach of the visiting team in the first American football homecoming game. He died on May 17, 1963, following a short illness, at his home in Dover, New Hampshire.

== Head coaching record ==
Year	Team	Overall	Conference	Standing	Bowl/playoffs
Kansas Jayhawks (Missouri Valley Intercollegiate Athletic Association) (1911)
1911	Kansas	4–2–2	1–1–1	3rd	
Kansas:		4–2–2	1–1–1		
Total:		4–2–2			
