= 1911 Washington University Pikers football team =

American college football season

1911 Washington University Pikers football
- Conference: Missouri Valley Conference
- Record: 4–2–2 (0–0–2 MVC)
- Head coach: Frank Cayou (4th season)
- Captain: Henry Nelson
- Home stadium: Francis Field

1911 Missouri Valley Conference football standings
	Conf.					Overall
Team	W		L		T	W		L		T
Iowa State +	2	–	0	–	1	6	–	1	–	1
Nebraska +	2	–	0	–	1	5	–	1	–	2
Kansas	1	–	1	–	1	4	–	2	–	2
Washington University	0	–	0	–	2	4	–	2	–	2
Missouri	0	–	2	–	2	2	–	4	–	2
Drake	0	–	2	–	1	5	–	2	–	1
+ – Conference co-champions

The 1911 Washington University Pikers football team represented Washington University in St. Louis as a member of the Missouri Valley Conference (MVC) during the 1911 college football season. Led by fourth-year head coach Frank Cayou, the Pikers compiled an overall record of 4–2–2 with a mark of 0–0–2 in conference play, tying for third place in the MVC. Washington University played home games at Francis Field in St. Louis.

== Schedule ==
Date	Time	Opponent	Site	Result	Attendance	Source
October 7	3:00 p.m.	Shurtleff*	Francis Field; St. Louis, MO	W 26–0		
October 14	3:00 p.m.	Cape Girardeau Normal*	Francis Field; St. Louis, MO	W 34–6	1,500	
October 21	3:00 p.m.	Westminster (MO)*	Francis Field; St. Louis, MO	W 12–0		
October 28		at Indiana*	Jordan Field; Bloomington, IN	L 0–12	3,000	
November 4	3:00 p.m.	Knox*	Francis Field; St. Louis, MO	W 10–6		
November 11	2:45 p.m.	Missouri	Francis Field; St. Louis, MO	T 5–5	10,000–12,000	
November 18		at Drake	Drake Stadium; Des Moines, IA	T 6–6	1,500	
November 25	2:45 p.m.	Arkansas*	Francis Field; St. Louis, MO	L 0–3	2,500	
*Non-conference game
