= 1911 Iowa State Cyclones football team =

American college football season

1911 Iowa State Cyclones football

MVC co-champion
- Conference: Missouri Valley Conference
- Record: 6–1–1 (2–0–1 MVC)
- Head coach: Clyde Williams (5th season)
- Captain: E. C. Harte
- Home stadium: State Field

1911 Missouri Valley Conference football standings
	Conf.					Overall
Team	W		L		T	W		L		T
Iowa State +	2	–	0	–	1	6	–	1	–	1
Nebraska +	2	–	0	–	1	5	–	1	–	2
Kansas	1	–	1	–	1	4	–	2	–	2
Washington University	0	–	0	–	2	4	–	2	–	2
Missouri	0	–	2	–	2	2	–	4	–	2
Drake	0	–	2	–	1	5	–	2	–	1
+ – Conference co-champions

The 1911 Iowa State Cyclones football team represented Iowa State College of Agriculture and Mechanic Arts—now known as Iowa State University—as a member of the Missouri Valley Conference (MVC) during the 1911 college football season. Led by fifth-year head coach Clyde Williams, the Cyclones compiled an overall record of 6–1–1 with a mark of 2–0–1 in conference play, sharing the MVC title with Nebraska. Iowa State's only loss of the season came in their season-opener against Minnesota, who finished the season undefeated and won the Western Conference title.

== Schedule ==
Date	Opponent	Site	Result	Attendance	Source
September 30	at Minnesota*	Northrop Field; Minneapolis, MN	L 0–5	3,000	
October 7	Coe*	State Field; Ames, IA	W 25–0		
October 21	Missouri	State Field; Ames, IA (rivalry)	W 6–3		
October 28	at Grinnell*	Grinnell, IA	W 21–6		
November 4	Nebraska	State Field; Ames, IA (rivalry)	T 6–6		
November 11	Cornell (IA)*	State Field; Ames, IA	W 15–0		
November 18	at Iowa*	Iowa Field; Iowa City, IA (rivalry)	W 9–0		
November 25	at Drake	Drake Stadium; Des Moines, IA	W 6–0		
*Non-conference game
