= 1911 Kansas vs. Missouri football game =

College American football game

- First American football homecoming game
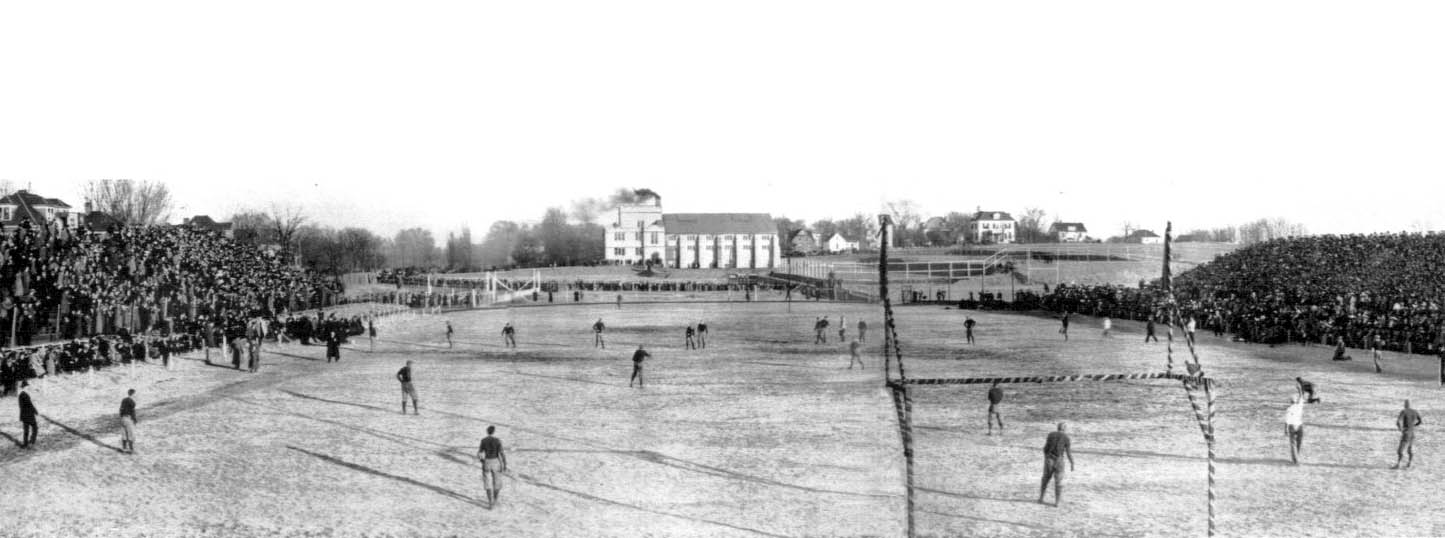
- A moment of the match
Kansas Jayhawks	Missouri Tigers
(4–2–1)	(2–4–1)
Head coach: Ralph W. Sherwin	Head coach: Chester Brewer
- Date: November 25, 1911
- Season: 1911
- Stadium: Rollins Field
- Location: Columbia, Missouri
- Attendance: 10,000+

The 1911 Kansas vs. Missouri football game was a college football game between the University of Kansas and the University of Missouri played on November 25, 1911 at Rollins Field in Columbia, Missouri. It is widely considered, although contested, to be the first college football homecoming game ever played.

The Missouri Tigers, under coach Chester Brewer entered the game with a record of 2 wins, 4 losses, and 1 tie. The Kansas Jayhawks, led by Ralph W. Sherwin brought a record of 4 wins, 2 losses, and 1 tie. The game ended in a 3–3 tie and was the final game of the season for both schools.

More than 1,000 people gathered in downtown Lawrence, Kansas to watch a mechanical reproduction of the game while it was being played. A Western Union telegraph wire was set up direct from Columbia, with information "broadcast" to Lawrence. A group of people then would announce the results of the previous play and used a large model of a football playing field to show the results. Those in attendance would cheer as though they were watching the game live, including the school's Rock Chalk, Jayhawk cheer.

== See also ==
- Border War (Kansas–Missouri rivalry)
- 1911 college football season
- List of historically significant college football games
