= 1911 Nebraska Cornhuskers football team =

American college football season

1911 Nebraska Cornhuskers football
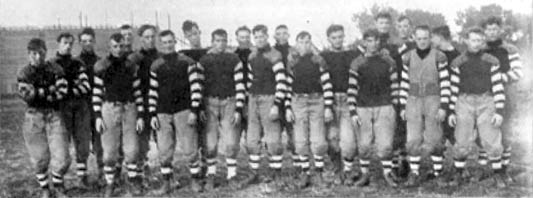

MVC co-champion Nebraska state champion
- Conference: Missouri Valley Conference
- Record: 5–1–2 (2–0–1 MVC)
- Head coach: Ewald O. Stiehm (1st season)
- Home stadium: Nebraska Field

1911 Missouri Valley Conference football standings
	Conf.					Overall
Team	W		L		T	W		L		T
Iowa State +	2	–	0	–	1	6	–	1	–	1
Nebraska +	2	–	0	–	1	5	–	1	–	2
Kansas	1	–	1	–	1	4	–	2	–	2
Washington University	0	–	0	–	2	4	–	2	–	2
Missouri	0	–	2	–	2	2	–	4	–	2
Drake	0	–	2	–	1	5	–	2	–	1
+ – Conference co-champions

The 1911 Nebraska Cornhuskers football team represented the University of Nebraska as a member of Missouri Valley Conference (MVC) during the 1911 college football season. The team was coached by first-year head coach Ewald O. Stiehm and played its home games at Nebraska Field in Lincoln, Nebraska.

Following the retirement of W.C. Cole in 1910, Nebraska hired Stiehm as his replacement. Nicknamed "Jumbo" because of his large feet, Stiehm was a regimented, fiery man who was prone to frequent tirades on the sidelines. Despite this, his first Cornhuskers team, with nine returning starters from 1910, split the MVC championship with Iowa State.

== Schedule ==
Date	Time	Opponent	Site	Result	Attendance	Source
October 7	3:30 p.m.	Kearney Normal*	Nebraska Field; Lincoln, NE	W 117–0		
October 14	3:30 p.m.	Kansas State*	Nebraska Field; Lincoln, NE (rivalry)	W 59–0		
October 21	2:30 p.m.	at Minnesota*	Northrop Field; Minneapolis, MN (rivalry)	L 3–21	10,000	
October 28	3:00 p.m.	Missouri	Nebraska Field; Lincoln, NE (rivalry)	W 34–0		
November 4	2:30 p.m.	at Iowa State	State Field; Ames, IA (rivalry)	T 6–6		
November 11	3:00 p.m.	Doane*	Nebraska Field; Lincoln, NE	W 27–0		
November 18	2:30 p.m.	at Kansas	Central Park; Lawrence, KS (rivalry)	W 29–0	7,000	
November 25	2:30 p.m.	Michigan*^{†}	Nebraska Field; Lincoln, NE	T 6–6		
*Non-conference game; ^{†}Homecoming

== Coaching staff ==
Coach	Position	First year	Alma mater
Ewald O. Stiehm	Head coach	1911	Wisconsin
Jack Best	Trainer	1890	Nebraska

== Roster ==
Anderson, Arthur G
Chauner, Walter E
Elliott, E.B. C
Frank, Ernest HB
Frank, Owen HB
Gibson, J.P. FB
Harman, Dewey RT
Hornberger, Evans G
Lofgren, Gus E
Pearson, Monte T
Potter, Herbert QB
Purdy, Leonard HB
Russell, Richard HB
Shonka, Sylvester LT
Swanson, Caesar LG
Warner, Leon QB

== Game summaries ==
=== Kearney State ===
Kearney State at Nebraska

Team	1	2	Total
Kearney State			0
• Nebraska			117

- Date: October 7, 1911
- Location: Nebraska Field, Lincoln, NE
- Game start: 3:30 p.m.

Stiehm's first game ended in a 117–0 blowout of Kearney State, two points shy of tying the program record of 119 points set in NU's previous game. This was the only meeting between Kearney State and Nebraska.

=== Kansas State ===
Kansas State at Nebraska

Team	1	2	Total
Kansas State			0
• Nebraska			59

- Date: October 14, 1911
- Location: Nebraska Field, Lincoln, NE
- Game start: 3:30 p.m.

Nebraska and Kansas State met for the first time in 1911, though they were not yet in the same conference.

=== At Minnesota ===
Nebraska at Minnesota

Team	1	2	Total
Nebraska			3
• Minnesota			21

- Date: October 21, 1911
- Location: Northrop Field, Minneapolis, MN
- Game start: 2:30 p.m.

Nebraska outgained Minnesota in both rushing and passing yards, but again fell to the Golden Gophers.

=== Missouri ===
Missouri at Nebraska

Team	1	2	Total
Missouri			0
• Nebraska			34

- Date: October 28, 1911
- Location: Nebraska Field, Lincoln, NE
- Game start: 3:00 p.m.

=== At Iowa State ===
Nebraska at Iowa State

Team	1	2	Total
Nebraska			6
Iowa State			6

- Date: November 4, 1911
- Location: State Field, Ames, IA
- Game start: 2:30 p.m.

=== Doane ===
Doane at Nebraska

Team	1	2	Total
Doane			0
• Nebraska			27

- Date: November 11, 1911
- Location: Nebraska Field, Lincoln, NE
- Game start: 3:00 p.m.

With wins against both in-state opponents, Nebraska recorded their eighth unofficial state championship.

=== At Kansas ===
Nebraska at Kansas

Team	1	2	Total
• Nebraska			29
Kansas			0

- Date: November 18, 1911
- Location: Central Park, Lawrence, KS
- Game start: 2:30 p.m.

Nebraska clinched a share of the Missouri Valley championship with a 6–0 win over Kansas.

=== Michigan ===
Michigan at Nebraska

Team	1	2	3	4	Total
Michigan	0	0	6	0	6
Nebraska	0	0	6	0	6

- Date: November 25, 1911
- Location: Nebraska Field, Lincoln, NE
- Game start: 2:30 p.m.
- Referee: Theodore M. Stuart (Michigan)

Michigan stars Stanfield Wells and Miller Pontius were unable to play, prompting the Detroit Free Press to quip that Michigan could claim the "world championship of injuries".

In the third quarter of a scoreless game, Michigan end Frederick L. Conklin blocked a Nebraska punt and returned it 30 yards for a touchdown. The Chicago Daily Tribune wrote: "Conklin broke through, blocked it, turned like lightning and sped without interference across the goal line for Michigan's first touchdown." NU responded on its next drive with two long end runs that took the ball to Michigan's eight-yard line, and halfback Leonard Purdy finished off the drive with a touchdown.

The New York Times called the game "the hardest contest ever witnessed on Nebraska Field."
