= Homecoming =

Tradition of welcoming back alumni of a school

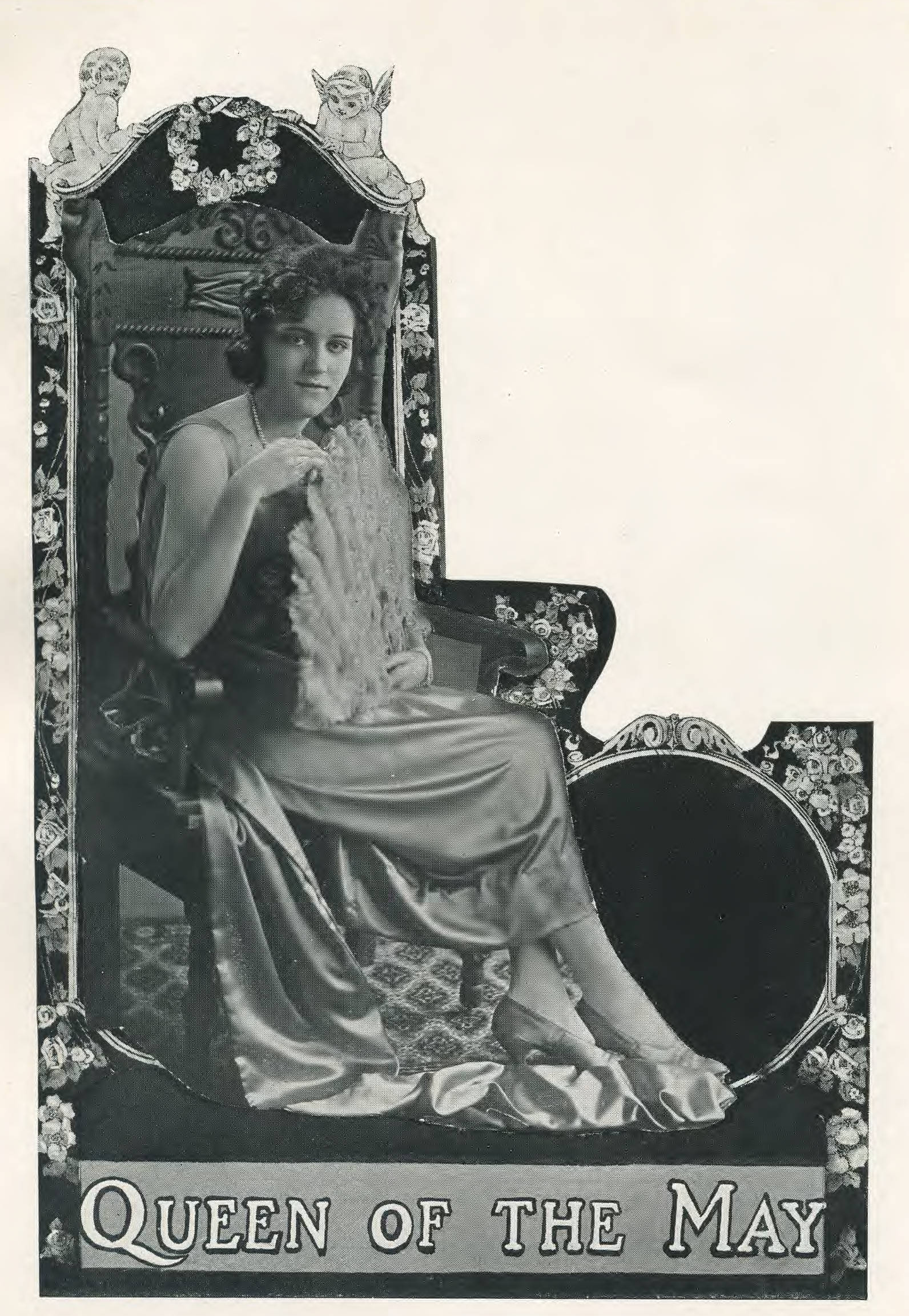
"Queen of the May" East Texas State Normal College in 1921, a predecessor of the modern homecoming queen

Homecoming is the tradition of welcoming back alumni or other former members of an organization to celebrate the organization's existence. It is a tradition in many high schools, colleges, and churches in the United States and Canada.

== United States ==
Homecoming is an annual tradition in the United States. People, towns, high schools and colleges come together, usually in late September or early October, to welcome back former members of the community. It is built around a central event, such as a banquet or dance and, most often, a game of American football, or on occasions, basketball, ice hockey or soccer. When celebrated by schools, the activities vary widely. However, they usually consist of a football game played on a school's home football field, activities for students and alumni, a parade featuring the school's choir, marching band and sports teams, and the coronation of a homecoming queen (and at many schools, a homecoming king). A dance commonly follows the game or takes place the day after the game.

When attached to a football game, homecoming traditionally occurs on the team's return from the longest road trip of the season or the first home game of a season that falls after an away game. The game itself, whether it be football or another sport, will typically feature the home team playing a considerably weaker opponent. The game is supposed to be an "easy win" and thus weaker schools will sometimes play lower-division schools.

=== Origins ===
The 1911 Kansas vs. Missouri football game is one of several claimed to be the first college football homecoming game.

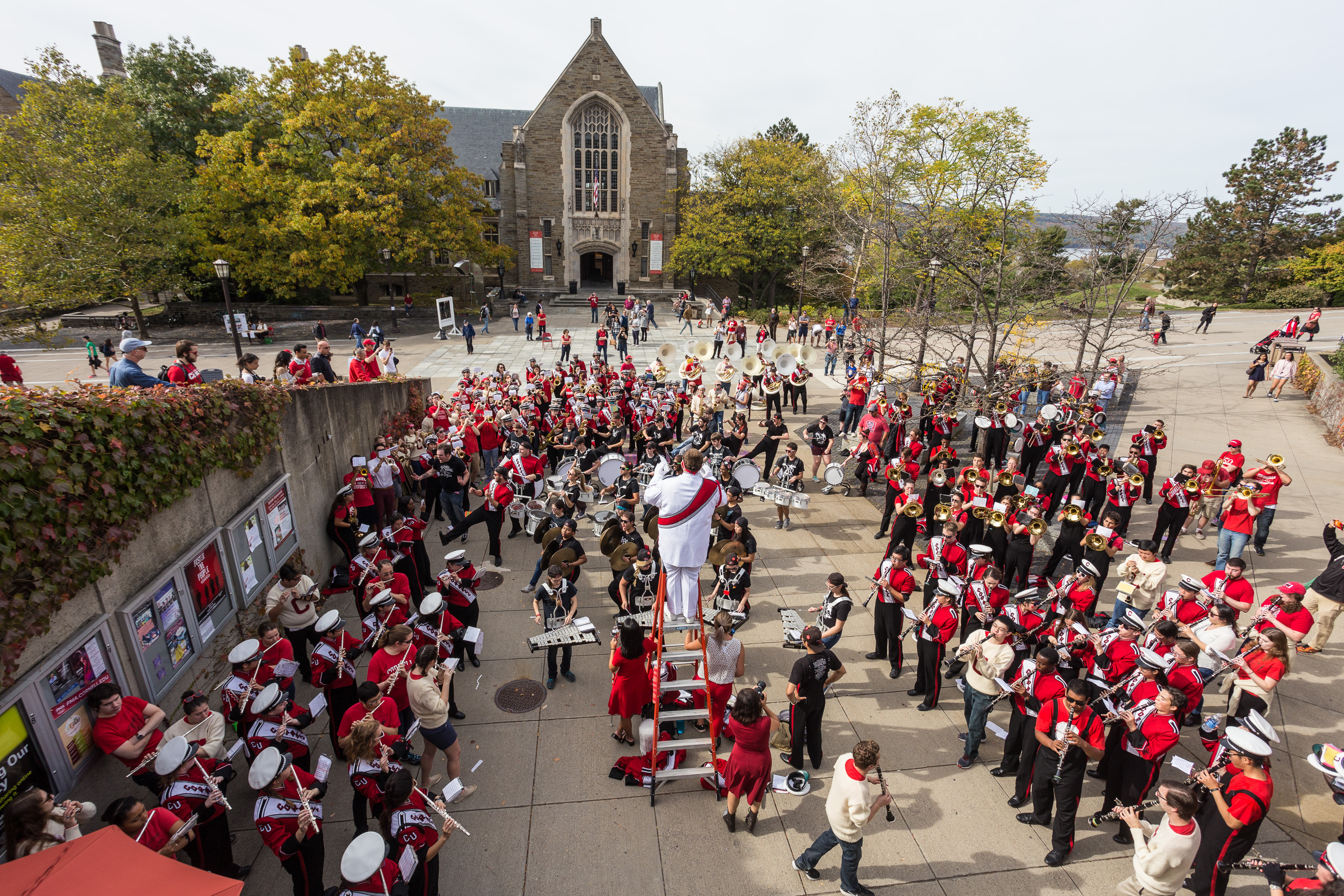
The Cornell Big Red Marching Band celebrates homecoming at Cornell University in Ithaca, New York, in October 2017.

The tradition of homecoming has its origin in alumni football games held at colleges and universities since the 19th century. Many schools including Baylor, the University of Illinois, the University of Missouri and Southwestern have claimed that they began homecoming. According to Trivial Pursuit and Jeopardy!, the first Homecoming was the 1911 game of football that the University of Missouri played against the University of Kansas, during which University of Missouri alumni were encouraged to attend. The 1911 Missouri-Kansas game appears to be the first homecoming event which included both a parade and an intercollegiate football game; such was the response and success that it became an annual event.

In 1891, the Missouri Tigers first faced off against the Kansas Jayhawks in the first installment of the Border War, the oldest college football rivalry west of the Mississippi River. The intense rivalry originally took place at neutral sites, usually in Kansas City, Missouri, until a new conference regulation was announced that required intercollegiate football games to be played on collegiate campuses. To renew excitement in the rivalry, ensure adequate attendance at the new location, and celebrate the first meeting of the two teams on the Mizzou campus in Columbia, Missouri, Mizzou Athletic Director Chester Brewer invited all alumni to "come home" for the game in 1911. Along with the football game, the celebration included a parade and spirit rally with a bonfire. The event was a success, with nearly 10,000 alumni coming home to take part in the celebration and watch the Tigers and Jayhawks play to a 3–3 tie.

Both the Illinois and Missouri annual homecoming celebrations, with their parade and spirit-rally centered on a large football game, are the models that took hold at colleges and high schools across the United States.

At least two colleges claim homecoming intercollegiate football games before the University of Missouri 1911 football game homecoming event: Baylor University, in Waco, Texas, and the University of Illinois in Champaign-Urbana, Illinois.

Baylor's homecoming history dates back to November 1909 and included a parade, reunion parties, and an afternoon football game (the final game of the 1909 season), a tradition that continued and celebrated its 100th anniversary in 2009. There was a gap between 1910 and 1915 when there was no homecoming event; however there has been continuity since 1915.

In 1910, University of Illinois held a weeklong homecoming celebration that concluded with an intercollegiate football game. This tradition has continued every year since then, making it the longest continuous Homecoming celebration in the nation, though, in 1918, because of the influenza pandemic, only the football game took place.

Although it did not initially include an intercollegiate football game, Northern Illinois University (NIU) has one of the longest-celebrated homecoming traditions in the country. The alumni football game played on October 10, 1903, began NIU's homecoming tradition.

Although it did not include an intercollegiate football game, Southwestern held its first Homecoming on Wednesday, April 21, 1909, in San Gabriel Park. Former students raised funds, provided housing, prepared and served a barbecue supper, and decorated the town buildings. Members of the senior class waited tables.

=== Traditions ===
==== Homecoming court ====
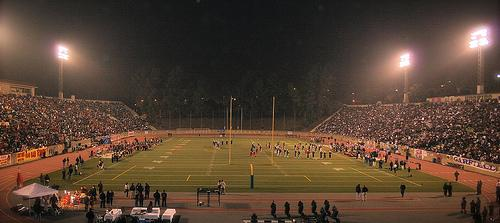
2007 East LA Classic Halftime show the homecoming football game. The Classic is one of the most highly acclaimed and attended high-school football games west of the Mississippi River and has taken place since 1925.

The backings court is a representative group of students that, in a coeducational institution, consists of a king and queen, and possibly prince(s) and princess(es). In 1952, Bates College seniors played a central role in organizing homecoming events, including Friday night assemblies, athletic events, and homecoming dances. These student-led traditions symbolize senior leadership roles and are often associated with homecoming courts at universities in the mid-20th century. In a single-sex institution, the homecoming court will usually consist of only a king and a prince (for an all-male school) or a queen and a princess (for an all-female school), although some schools may choose to join with single-sex schools of the other sex to elect the homecoming court jointly.

Generally, the king and queen are students completing their final years of study at their school (also called "seniors"), while the prince and princess are underclassmen often with a prince/princess for each grade. Recently, some high schools have chosen to add categories, such as Duke and Duchess, to extend the representation of students to include a category in which students with special needs are elected. In high school, 17- or 18-year-old students in their final year are represented by a king or queen; in college, students who are completing their final year of study, usually between 21–23 years old.

Local rules determine when the homecoming king and queen are crowned. Sometimes, the big announcement comes at a pep rally, school assembly, or public ceremony one or more days before the football game. Other schools crown their royalty at the homecoming football game, a dance, or other school events.

Often, the previous year's king and queen are invited back to crown their successors. If they are absent for whatever reason, someone else—usually, another previous king or queen, a popular teacher, or a royal representative—will perform those duties. Usually, the queen is crowned first, followed by the king. The crowning method also varies by school, however, the crown is typically preserved and passed down to each successor.

Homecoming court members who are not crowned king or queen are often called escorts or royalty. They are often expected to participate in the week's activities as well. At some schools, a homecoming prince/princess, duke/duchess, etc. (often underclassmen nominated by their classmates) are crowned along with the king and queen; sometimes, middle school and junior high students may partake in the high school activities

==== Parade ====
Many homecoming celebrations include a parade. Students often select the grand marshal based on a history of service and support to the school and community. The parade includes the school's marching band and different school organizations’ floats created by the classes and organizations and most of the sports get a chance to be in the parade. Every class prepares a float which corresponds with the homecoming theme or related theme of school spirit as assigned by school administrators. In addition, the homecoming court takes part in the parade, often riding together in one or more convertibles as part of the parade. Michigan State University's homecoming parade, with its cheerleaders, marching bands, vehicles decorated for local politicians and corporate sponsors, and participants in student clubs and organizations, speaks well of the school's spirit and community identity. Homecoming courts also often participate in parades, which they do by travelling in open wagons or on foot. Community civic organizations and businesses, area fire departments, and alumni groups often participate as well. The parade is often part of a series of activities scheduled for that specific day, which can also include a pep rally, bonfire, snake dance, and other activities for students and alumni.

==== Tailgate ====
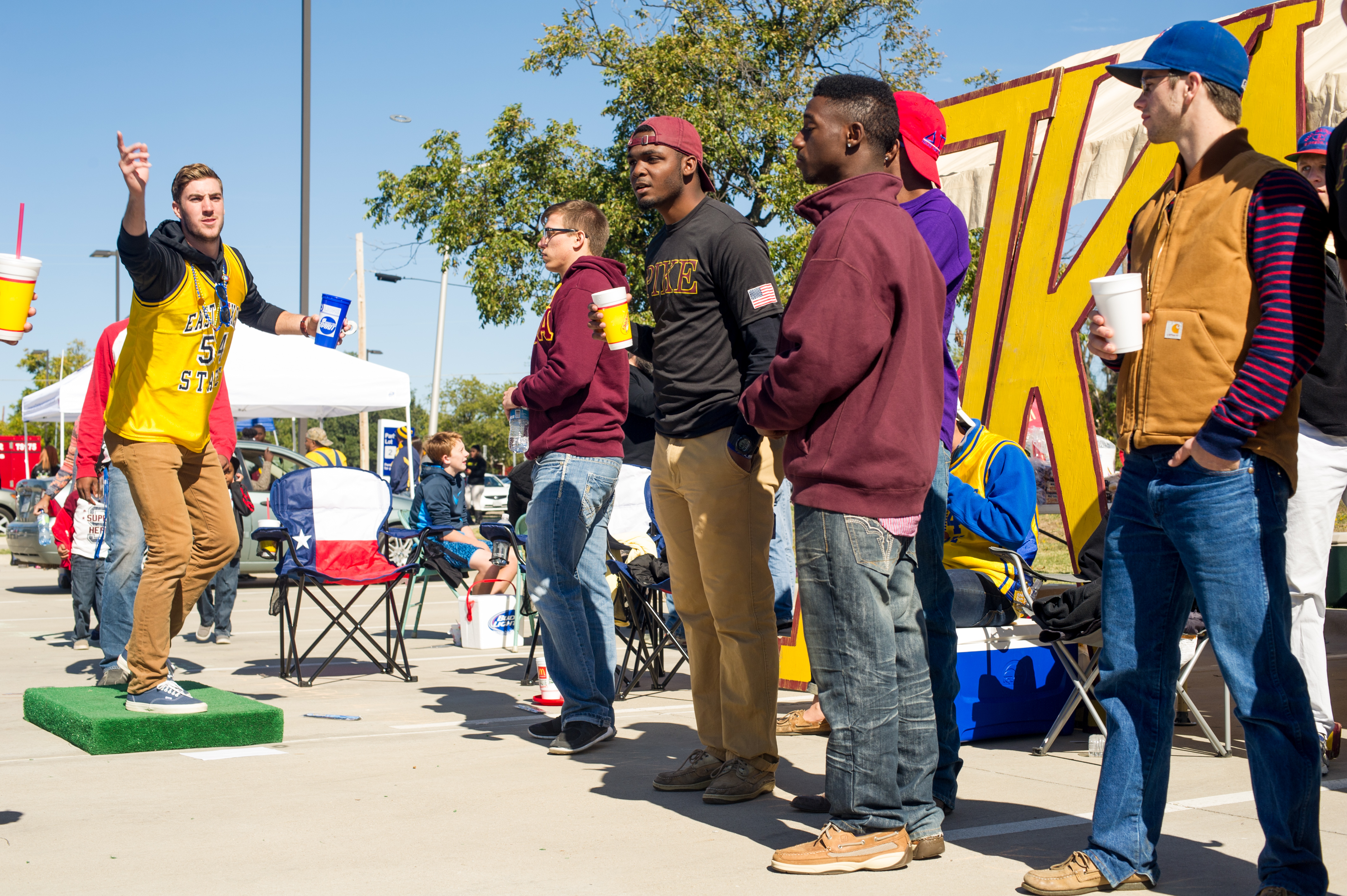
Homecoming tailgate at Texas A&M University–Commerce in 2014

At most major colleges and universities, the football game and preceding tailgate party are the most widely recognized and heavily attended events of the week. Alumni gather from all around the world to return to their alma mater, reconnect with one another, and take part in the festivities. Students, alumni, businesses, and members of the community set up tents in parking lots, fields, and streets near the stadium to cook food, play games, socialize, binge drink, and even enjoy live music in many instances. These celebrations often last straight through the game for those who do not have tickets but still come to take part in the socializing and excitement of the homecoming atmosphere. Most tents even include television or radio feeds of the game for those without tickets.

==== Picnic ====
Sometimes during the school week, a picnic can occur. The picnic is very similar to the tailgate party, but it occurs after school or during the school's lunch period.

==== Dress-up days ====
Throughout the week, many schools (particularly high schools) engage in special dress-up days, sometimes called "Spirit Week", where students are allowed to wear clothing suitable to the theme (e.g., 1980s day, toga day, roll out of bed day, cowboy day, nerd day, pirate day, meme day, Rat Pack Day, flannel Friday, What-not-to-wear Wednesday) leading to the homecoming. Students traditionally wear clothing with their school's name, or clothing and makeup of their school's colors on Friday.

==== Pep rallies ====
Many schools hold a rally during homecoming week, often one or more nights before the game. The events vary, but may include skits, games, introduction of the homecoming court (and coronation of the king and queen if that is the school's tradition), and comments from the football players or coach about the upcoming game.

At some schools, the homecoming rally ends with a bonfire (in which old wood structures, the rival school's memorabilia and other items are burned in a controlled fire). Many colleges and high schools no longer hold bonfires because of accidents that have occurred surrounding these events in the past. The most well known accident took place in 1999, when 12 students were killed and 27 others were injured at Texas A&M University when a 40-foot-tall (12 m) pile of logs that had been assembled for a bonfire collapsed. However, this incident was not associated with homecoming—A&M is one of the few schools that do not organize a homecoming, although it has many unique traditions. The bonfire was associated with the annual rivalry game between A&M and the University of Texas.

==== Alumni band ====
The alumni band consists of former college and university band members who return for homecoming to perform with the current marching band (usually made up of recent graduates to members who graduated years or decades before) either during halftime as a full band or a featured section, e.g. the trumpet section or the tubas and drumline squads, as well as performing with the current band during the post-game concert.

==== Homecoming dance ====
Some high schools and colleges in the United States have homecoming dances as part of their homecoming celebrations. The location of the homecoming dance varies from school to school. At Southwestern Oklahoma State University, for example, proms are held in the student centre, and at many high schools, proms are held in gymnasiums or other large campus venues. While there is no uniform national standard, both school-sponsored documents and the student newspaper mention prom dress requirements. Suggested outfits for boys include slacks, button-up shirts and ties, which strike a balance between casual and formal. Girls can choose cocktail dresses or other short skirts. It is common practice to coordinate colours according to the theme of the ball.

Because football and alumni activities are the focus of homecoming for college students, Prom is often scheduled for the evening. At Southwestern Oklahoma State University, after a full day of parades, alumni bands and football games, the Homecoming dance will be held at 9 p.m. in the Memorial Student Center, marking the culmination of homecoming. In addition, due to the many homecoming events, some colleges will hold homecoming dances the following night. In 1952, Bates College's "Return to Bates" ball on Saturdays from 8:30 p.m. to midnight was performed live by Lloyd Ravenell's orchestra. This organized sequence of events reflects that homecoming is often the most important social event after vibrant parades and athletic events.

=== Competitions ===
At the high school level, students generally compete by grade level in events such as spirit days, parade floats, and powder puff football. Modoc High School 2024 organized events such as a powder puff football competition, a cheerleading competition and a themed dress-up day that reflected competition and school spirit among all grade levels. The competition at the collegiate level is mainly between Greek-letter organizations and, to a lesser degree, residence halls. At most larger schools, fraternities and sororities compete on parade floats, house decorations, skits, talent competitions, and service events such as blood drives or food drives. At Iowa State University, the fraternity has organized lawn displays, campus-wide spiritual gatherings, skits Like "Yell Like Hell" and community service challenges. This homecoming celebration brings everyone together, promotes interaction among students, and enhances competition within the organization and between classes. On coronation night, some schools play games between classes. Such events include the pyramid, three-legged race, pop chug, and tug of war.

=== Smaller school homecomings ===
While most schools schedule their homecoming activities around football, smaller schools that do not have a football team may plan the annual event at another time of the year. In these instances, basketball, ice hockey or soccer serves as the "big boy game" for students and alumni. Often in smaller towns with smaller populations, the parade is omitted. The University of Southern Maine, which has no football team, organized homecoming celebrations around other sports. In 2024, the school became the focus of homecoming events when it hosted a men's ice hockey blue-gold showdown and a hockey game on homecoming weekend.

At schools without athletic programs, the centerpiece event is usually a banquet, where alumni are recognized. This format is also used for alumni events of high schools that have either closed or consolidated with other high schools; the high school classes continue to meet and celebrate their years at their now-defunct alma mater. In 2024, Lafayette College held an annual alumni banquet for the men's hockey program and hosted many alumni games to keep alumni connected and traditions alive. In other cases, alumni of closed schools will participate in the consolidated school's homecoming, where special recognition is often given to alumni of the once-separate schools.

=== Courtwarming ===
In some parts of the United States, high school basketball has gained a homecoming celebration of its own. Often referred to as "court warming" or "winter homecoming", but also referred "hoopcoming", "coronation", "snowcoming", "Colors Day", it usually includes rallies, dress-up days, special dinners, king and queen coronations, and other winter-friendly activities typically associated with football homecoming.

== Canada ==
Canadian homecoming weekends are less common than in the United States, but do take place in some areas.

=== High school ===
Homecomings are rare in Canada, and typically only take place in high schools situated in the east of the country. Newmarket High School, London South Collegiate Institute, Banting Memorial High School, Earl Haig Secondary School and St. Michael's College School are examples of schools in Ontario known to arrange homecomings. Upper Canada College also has a longstanding homecoming tradition, although the event is referred to as "A-Day" (Association Day). St. Thomas More Collegiate in Burnaby, British Columbia, hosts a Homecoming Event on the third Saturday of September and New Westminster Secondary School hosts a Homecoming Event on the fourth Saturday of September.

=== University ===
Some universities in Canada are also known to host Homecomings, although these are rarely as high profile as in the United States. They generally take place in September. Universities such as The University of Guelph, Western University, Concordia University, Queen's University, and The University of British Columbia have hosted homecomings in the past.

Unsanctioned street parties in celebration of Homecoming weekend, known colloquially as "hoco", occur every year at Queen's University, Wilfrid Laurier University, McMaster University, Dalhousie University, and the University of Western Ontario. When the date of homecoming lands on reading week, an unsanctioned party known as "foco", or "fake homecoming" will occur instead.

== Church homecomings ==
The term "homecoming" can also refer to the special services conducted by some religious congregations, particularly by many smaller American Protestant churches, to celebrate church heritage and welcome back former members or pastors. They are often held annually, but are sometimes held as one-time-only events, to celebrate the occasion.

== See also ==
- Decoration Day (tradition)
- May Queen
- Prom
- Winter Formal
