= 1911 Kansas State Aggies football team =

American college football season

1911 Kansas State Aggies football
- Conference: Kansas Collegiate Athletic Conference
- Record: 5–4–1 ( KCAC)
- Head coach: Guy Lowman (1st season)
- Home stadium: Ahearn Field

The 1911 Kansas State Aggies football team represented Kansas State Agricultural College in the 1911 college football season.

== Schedule ==
Date	Time	Opponent	Site	Result	Attendance	Source
September 30		Southwestern (KS)	Ahearn Field; Manhattan, KS	T 6–6		
October 7		Kansas State Normal	Ahearn Field; Manhattan, KS	L 0–3		
October 14		at Nebraska	Nebraska Field; Lincoln, NE (rivalry)	L 0–59		
October 21		Kansas	Ahearn Field; Manhattan, KS (rivalry)	L 0–6	2,200	
October 28		Fairmount	Ahearn Field; Manhattan, KS	W 9–5		
November 4		at Baker	Baldwin City, KS	L 0–3		
November 11		Creighton	Ahearn Field; Manhattan, KS	W 12–0		
November 18	3:00 p.m.	vs. Arkansas	Gordon and Koppel Field; Kansas City, MO	W 3–0		
November 24		Oklahoma A&M	Ahearn Field; Manhattan, KS	W 11–0		
November 30		at Washburn	Topeka, KS	W 6–5		
All times are in Central time
