= Border War (Kansas–Missouri rivalry) =

American college sports rivalry

- Kansas Missouri
- Sport: Multiple
- First meeting: 1891 (football); 1899 (baseball); 1907 (men's basketball)
- Latest meeting: September 11, 2026 (football); Missouri 38-21
- Next meeting: December 6, 2026 (basketball)
- Trophy: Indian War Drum (football); Lamar Hunt Trophy (football)

Locations of the University of Kansas and University of Missouri

The Border War is a rivalry between the athletic programs of the University of Kansas and the University of Missouri. It has been officially named the Border Showdown since 2004, and promoted as the Hy-Vee Hoops Border Showdown for basketball games since 2021. The rivalry is more known for football and men's basketball, though it exists in all sports.

The Kansas Jayhawks and the Missouri Tigers began playing each other in 1891. From 1907 to 2012 both schools were in the same athletic conference and competed annually in all sports. Sports Illustrated described the rivalry as the oldest (Division I) rivalry west of the Mississippi River in 2011, but went dormant after Missouri departed the Big 12 Conference for the Southeastern Conference on July 1, 2012. Despite Missouri wanting to continue athletic competition, no further regular season games were scheduled between the two schools for several years. However, the two schools played an exhibition game in men's basketball on October 22, 2017, with Kansas defeating Missouri 93–87. Proceeds went to four different charities for Hurricane Harvey and Hurricane Maria relief funds. On October 21, 2019, the schools agreed to play six basketball games beginning in 2020, however, due to the COVID-19 pandemic, the renewal was postponed one season. Then, on May 2, the schools made an agreement for football games to be played in 2025, 2026, 2031, and 2032.

The rivalry has historic roots in the often violent relationship between the states of Kansas and Missouri, including guerrilla warfare between the states before and during the American Civil War.

== Background ==
Many believe the rivalry can trace its history to open violence involving anti-slavery and pro-slavery elements that took place in the Kansas Territory and the western frontier towns of Missouri throughout the 1850s. These incidents were attempts by some Missourians (then a slave state) to influence whether Kansas would enter the Union as a free or slave state. The era of political turbulence and violence has been termed Bleeding Kansas. When the Civil War began, the animosity that developed during the Kansas territorial period erupted in particularly vicious fighting. In the opening year of the war, six Missouri towns (the largest being Osceola) and large swaths of western Missouri were plundered and burned by various forces from Kansas generically termed jayhawkers. These attacks led to a retaliatory raid on Lawrence, Kansas two years later (Lawrence Massacre), which led to General Order No. 11 (1863), the forced depopulation of several western Missouri counties. The raid on Lawrence was led by William Quantrill, a Confederate guerrilla born in Ohio who had formed his bushwhacker group at the end of 1861. Quantrill had earlier been a resident of Lawrence, teaching school there until the school closed in 1860. Quantrill also attacked a nearby town of Olathe causing chaos during the civil war.

A recent analysis of the rivalry's history by a University of Kansas professor concludes that historical memories of the Civil War era were not introduced into the athletic rivalry until the 1970s, and the historical angle did not seep into the popular imagination until the 1990s. A rebuttal provided extensive evidence the rivalry "from its start, was influenced by animosity dating to the Border War". Evidence cited included a newspaper article on the 1891 game opening with a reference to the Border War, and a University of Missouri professor stating in 1910, "the annual football game ... is but a continuation of the border warfare of earlier times." Additionally, an article on the rivalry written by Kansas football coach A. R. Kennedy in 1917 stated, "no wonder the border warfare terms of 'Jayhawk' and 'Bushwhacker' were revived, for in many ways football is a worthy successor to war."

The mascots of the two universities were also derived from this time period. The University of Kansas, like many other universities, had no official mascot during the early years of its existence. The football team had used many different independent mascots, including a pig. In the three years preceding and the decades following the Civil War, the term "Jayhawker" was generally an epithet denoting "plundering marauder" both in the Missouri–Kansas region and nationally. However, after Charles Jenison christened the Seventh Kansas Volunteer Cavalry "The Independent Kansas Jayhawkers" in 1861, the term also began to be used as a term for any troops from Kansas, and eventually by Kansans as a term they proudly applied to themselves. By the late 1800s, it had become synonymous with native Kansans, much like Hoosiers in the state of Indiana. According to the University of Kansas, when KU football players first took the field in 1890, they were called the Jayhawkers. The University of Missouri also adopted a Civil War-related name. When the MU football team was first formed in 1890, at a mass meeting of students and interested citizens held to perfect the organization of the team, "Tigers" was unanimously selected as the team name. During the Civil War, the "Tigers" were a "home guard" unit that protected Columbia from guerilla attack. The Tigers militia unit was commanded by James Rollins, upon whom the MU's board of curators later bestowed the title of "Pater Universitatis Missouriensis" (Father of the University of Missouri) in recognition of his "great efforts to promote the posterity, usefulness, and success" of the university. Ironically, they once protected Columbia from attack by a band led by "Bloody Bill" Anderson, who participated in the Burning of Lawrence along with Quantrill.

Over time, even the coaches have gotten into the rivalry. Former Kansas football coach Don Fambrough, when referred to a physician across the state line in Kansas City, Missouri, for treatment, exclaimed "I'll die first!" Not to be outdone, Missouri's former basketball coach Norm Stewart would traditionally have his players stay in Kansas City, Missouri, before playing at Kansas, going so far as to require the team bus to buy its gasoline at a Missouri filling station and reprimanding players who ate in Kansas, as he did not want to put any money into Kansas's economy.

The 2007 football season brought the origins of the rivalry between the two states back into the spotlight. A T-shirt created by a Missouri alumnus gained national attention with its reference to Quantrill's raid of 1863. The Missouri alumnus used the shirt to celebrate Missouri pro-slavery fighters burning the town of Lawrence, Kansas. The residents of Lawrence were largely Jayhawkers. The shirt depicted the burning of Lawrence in 1863 following the raid of William Quantrill and his Bushwhackers. The image of Lawrence burning was paired with the word "Scoreboard" and a Mizzou logo. On the back of the shirts, William Quantrill was quoted, saying "Our cause is just, our enemies many." Some Kansas fans interpreted these shirts as supporting slavery, and in recent years, the epithet "Slavers" has been employed by many KU fans to refer to anything related to Missouri. KU supporters returned fire with a shirt depicting abolitionist John Brown with the words, "Kansas: Keeping America Safe From Missouri Since 1854.

The 2007 Border Showdown logo

=== Name change ===
In 2004 its name was officially changed from Border War to the Border Showdown. KU athletic director Lew Perkins stated, "We feel that in the aftermath of September 11, 2001, and the ensuing events around the world, it is inappropriate to use the term 'war' to describe intercollegiate athletics events." The name change was generally criticized by people on both sides. Players, students, alumni, and fans failed to adopt the new name, and even media outlets such as Sports Illustrated and NBC continued to refer to the rivalry as the Border War.

== Basketball ==
Kansas leads the all-time series, 177–96.

=== Notable games ===
- 1906–07 – Missouri began the basketball border showdown in Columbia against the Jayhawks with a 34–31 triumph, and the following day followed it up with a 34–12 beating. This left Missouri with a 2–0 all-time record against the inventor of basketball, and Kansas's first coach, James Naismith.
- 1909–1910 – Each of the basketball teams had players from the team's football squad (Tommy Johnson for Kansas, and Ted Hackney for Missouri). The players picked up where they left off from the gridiron, playing a rough and tumble style that, some stories say, caused James Naismith to exclaim, when viewing the second contest between the two, "Oh, my gracious! They are murdering my game!" Kansas won both meetings.
- 1922 – Kansas and Missouri split their conference games, tying for the Missouri valley title at 15–1. Although Missouri's committee on intercollegiate athletics challenged Kansas to a one-game playoff at a neutral site, Phog Allen refused to accept, leaving the decision to Kansas's athletic board and Chancellor, who declined. While no national champions were actually crowned until 1938 when the first national tournament was held, in 1936 Kansas was retroactively awarded a Helms Foundation National Championship. The title was again awarded to Kansas for the 1923 season.
- 1951 – In the finals of the Big 7 Holiday Tournament, Kansas center Clyde Lovellette stomped on the stomach of Missouri star Win Wilfong. He was ejected from the game and reprimanded by coach Phog Allen. Missouri coach Wilbur Stalcup worked the microphone to calm down outraged Tigers fans, and in so doing, earned the respect of Allen (the two had previously been enemies). Kansas won the game and the tournament with a 75–65 victory.
- 1961 – During a MU loss to Kansas in Lawrence, a bench-clearing fistfight erupted between the two teams. Afterward, KU athletic director Dutch Lonborg suggested the schools discontinue the rivalry. In the nationally televised return match, won by Missouri, another brawl exploded, this time involving the fans who streamed onto the court after Wayne Hightower threw a punch after being fouled while trying to rebound a missed lay-up. The incidents were seen as a holdover from the 1960 football controversy.
- 1971 – Kansas defeated Missouri, 72–68 in overtime, to win the final game ever played at MU's Brewer Fieldhouse. KU ended up with a record of 25–18 all-time at Brewer. This win brought the Jayhawks one step closer to a perfect Big 8 record (they later beat Nebraska to achieve the 14–0 mark.)
- 1972 – with Kansas having a poor season and Missouri trying for a Big 8 title, Bud Stallworth dropped 50 points on Missouri in the final regular season game of the year in a 93–80 Kansas win at Allen Fieldhouse, handing the conference championship to Kansas State.
- 1987 – MU and KU faced off in the title game of the Big Eight Tournament. KU's Danny Manning elbowed MU's Derrick Chievous in the eye by accident. Chievous nonetheless led his Tigers to the 1987 Big Eight Tournament championship. The year also saw almost-identical game-winning field goals from Mizzou freshman guard Lee Coward at the ends of two games, the regular-season clash at Hearnes and in the Big Eight Tournament final.
- 1989 – Missouri registered the largest victory by a visitor in Allen Fieldhouse, winning 91–66 over Kansas under first-year coach Roy Williams. (Texas would later match Missouri's record during the 2020–21 season with a 25-point win over their own over Kansas in Allen Fieldhouse.)
- 1990 – The two teams met in Allen Fieldhouse, with KU #1 and Mizzou #2. The Tigers win, 77–71. Missouri also defeated KU earlier in the year in a #4 vs. #1 game.
- 1994 – The Tigers twice defeated a higher-ranked Kansas team, sweeping KU on their way to an undefeated conference record.
- 1995 – Kansas became the first visiting team to score 100 points in the Hearnes Center, winning 102–89.
- 1996 – Missouri upset the #3 Jayhawks in Columbia 77–73. This was the first of three straight years that a top 3 or higher ranked KU team lost at MU.
- 1997 – A top-ranked and undefeated Kansas team starring Jacque Vaughn, Paul Pierce, and Raef LaFrentz came into Columbia to face the unheralded Tigers. In a see-saw battle that some have called the greatest MU–KU game ever, Corey Tate's jumper with five seconds left in double overtime handed Kansas its only regular-season loss, 96–94.
- 1998 – With Kansas again ranked in the top 3, and Mizzou clinging to a 74–73 lead at Hearnes with under five seconds left, Paul Pierce rose for what appeared to be the game winning shot on the elbow but Dibi Ray stripped the ball just before the shot to preserve the win for the Tigers.
- 2002 – At Allen Fieldhouse, KU headed to the locker room with a slim 43–42 halftime lead. The second half belonged to the Jayhawks, as they doubled up Mizzou 62–31 in the final 20 minutes en route to a 105–73 win. Kansas would later become the first team to achieve a perfect 16–0 record in the Big 12, concluding the season with a 95–92 win in Columbia.
- 2003 – During halftime of the KU-Texas basketball game, former MU coach Norm Stewart is presented a rocking chair by KU. A common chant in Allen Fieldhouse during the "Stormin' Norman" days with the Tigers was "Sit Down, Norm!" whenever he would jump off the bench to argue a call. For the only time ever, the Fieldhouse crowd told him to "sit down, Norm!" good-naturedly.
- 2004 – Kansas won the final game ever played at Hearnes Center 84–82 on David Padgett's basket with 2 seconds left. Hearnes remains the only venue in which Missouri holds an advantage over Kansas at 18–14 all-time (Kansas has a 5–4 lead in games played in Mizzou Arena following the 2022 matchup between the schools).
- 2006 – Missouri upset Kansas in overtime when KU's Christian Moody misses two straight free throws with 0.4 seconds remaining in regulation. Afterward, however, the Tigers collapse, Quin Snyder resigns as coach, and in the rematch in Lawrence, Kansas crushed MU 79–46.
- 2007 – In Lawrence, KU freshman Sherron Collins came off the bench for 23 points to thwart Missouri's upset bid in an 80–77 win, the first MU-KU game for new Tiger coach Mike Anderson. In Columbia, the Jayhawks' Julian Wright scored a career-best 33 in a 92–74 win, KU's first victory over the Tigers in Mizzou Arena. The game was played on the one-year anniversary of the resignation of Missouri coach Quin Snyder.
- 2009 – In the first meeting since 2003 in which the Tigers and Jayhawks were both ranked, Kansas goes up 30–16 at the half, but a furious Mizzou comeback capped by a Zaire Taylor jumper with 1.3 seconds to play gives Missouri the win in Columbia, 62–60. In the rematch at Allen Fieldhouse, Kansas avenged its loss to Missouri 90–65.
- 2012 – In the final year that the rivalry was an in-conference rivalry before the Tigers departed for the SEC, both teams win at home with remarkable come-from-behind wins. Missouri overcame a late 8-point deficit with less than three minutes to go in the game in Columbia, en route to a 74–71 victory. The Jayhawks return the favor by overcoming a 19-point second half deficit to force overtime in Lawrence, ultimately winning 87–86. In both games, Kansas and Missouri were ranked in the top ten.
- 2017 – Missouri and Kansas played an exhibition game at T-Mobile Center before the 2017–18 NCAA Division I men's basketball season, with proceeds going to hurricane relief. More than $1.75 million was raised from ticket sales, pay-per-view, and text donations. The Jayhawks won the game 93–87.
- 2021 – In the first regular season game since Missouri's departure to the SEC, the 8th-ranked Jayhawks defeated Missouri 102–65, the largest margin of victory by Kansas over Missouri since 1977. Kansas never trailed in the game and outside of the start of the game, the teams were never tied. The game marked the return of the rivalry and is the first of a six game series, to be split between both campuses and the T-Mobile Center. The first game was supposed to be played the previous season but was postponed because of the COVID-19 pandemic.
- 2024 - Missouri and Kansas met in Columbia on December 8, 2024, with Kansas coming into the game ranked #1. The Jayhawks were coming off of a 76–63 defeat from Creighton earlier in the week. The Tigers were coming off of a 98–93 comeback victory over California in the ACC/SEC Challenge. The Tigers would quickly jump out to a commanding 34–17 lead with 3:12 left in the first half, and led 39–25 at the break. The Tigers started the 2nd half strong with a 18–6 run before Kansas went on a 15–0 run. The Jayhawks led once in the game, a 2–0 lead. The closest they would come to the lead was 65–63. The Tigers defeated the #1 Jayhawks 76–67.

=== Basketball game results ===
- Largest KU win: 47 pts (1977)
- Largest MU win: 30 pts (1976)

| Kansas victories | Missouri victories | Tie games |

| No. | Date | Location | Winner | Score |
|---|---|---|---|---|
| 1 | March 11, 1907 | Columbia, MO | Missouri | 34–31 |
| 2 | March 12, 1907 | Columbia, MO | Missouri | 34–12 |
| 3 | February 4, 1908 | Lawrence, KS | Kansas | 21–20 |
| 4 | February 5, 1908 | Lawrence, KS | Kansas | 24–18 |
| 5 | February 17, 1908 | Columbia, MO | Kansas | 30–19 |
| 6 | February 18, 1908 | Columbia, MO | Kansas | 26–22 |
| 7 | February 3, 1909 | Lawrence, KS | Kansas | 24–15 |
| 8 | February 4, 1909 | Lawrence, KS | Kansas | 31–23 |
| 9 | February 12, 1909 | Columbia, MO | Kansas | 24–19 |
| 10 | February 13, 1909 | Columbia, MO | Missouri | 37–21 |
| 11 | February 11, 1910 | Lawrence, KS | Kansas | 29–15 |
| 12 | February 12, 1910 | Lawrence, KS | Kansas | 27–14 |
| 13 | February 21, 1910 | Columbia, MO | Kansas | 25–21 |
| 14 | February 22, 1910 | Columbia, MO | Kansas | 58–22 |
| 15 | January 27, 1911 | Lawrence, KS | Kansas | 34–28 |
| 16 | January 28, 1911 | Lawrence, KS | Kansas | 27–15 |
| 17 | February 17, 1911 | Columbia, MO | Kansas | 32–16 |
| 18 | February 18, 1911 | Columbia, MO | Kansas | 36–25 |
| 19 | February 9, 1912 | Lawrence, KS | Kansas | 27–16 |
| 20 | February 10, 1912 | Lawrence, KS | Kansas | 31–21 |
| 21 | February 21, 1912 | Columbia, MO | Kansas | 39–24 |
| 22 | February 22, 1912 | Columbia, MO | Kansas | 32–26 |
| 23 | February 14, 1913 | Lawrence, KS | Kansas | 22–12 |
| 24 | February 15, 1913 | Lawrence, KS | Kansas | 34–20 |
| 25 | February 26, 1913 | Columbia, MO | Missouri | 26–20 |
| 26 | February 27, 1913 | Columbia, MO | Kansas | 34–26 |
| 27 | February 11, 1914 | Columbia, MO | Kansas | 28–25 |
| 28 | February 12, 1914 | Columbia, MO | Kansas | 27–21 |
| 29 | February 25, 1914 | Lawrence, KS | Kansas | 38–22 |
| 30 | February 26, 1914 | Lawrence, KS | Kansas | 31–18 |
| 31 | February 19, 1915 | Lawrence, KS | Kansas | 44–19 |
| 32 | February 20, 1915 | Lawrence, KS | Kansas | 42–23 |
| 33 | February 24, 1915 | Columbia, MO | Kansas | 33–22 |
| 34 | February 25, 1915 | Columbia, MO | Kansas | 40–26 |
| 35 | February 9, 1916 | Columbia, MO | Missouri | 30–24 |
| 36 | February 10, 1916 | Columbia, MO | Missouri | 42–20 |
| 37 | February 28, 1916 | Lawrence, KS | Missouri | 41–10 |
| 38 | February 29, 1916 | Lawrence, KS | Kansas | 31–19 |
| 39 | February 6, 1917 | Lawrence, KS | Kansas | 24–23 |
| 40 | February 7, 1917 | Lawrence, KS | Missouri | 26–17 |
| 41 | February 21, 1917 | Columbia, MO | Missouri | 24–20 |
| 42 | February 22, 1917 | Columbia, MO | Missouri | 38–15 |
| 43 | February 4, 1918 | Lawrence, KS | Missouri | 36–22 |
| 44 | February 5, 1918 | Lawrence, KS | Missouri | 25–21 |
| 45 | February 20, 1918 | Columbia, MO | Missouri | 39–21 |
| 46 | February 21, 1918 | Columbia, MO | Kansas | 28–23 |
| 47 | January 31, 1919 | Lawrence, KS | Missouri | 43–25 |
| 48 | February 1, 1919 | Lawrence, KS | Missouri | 37–15 |
| 49 | February 19, 1919 | Columbia, MO | Missouri | 34–20 |
| 50 | February 20, 1919 | Columbia, MO | Kansas | 36–29 |
| 51 | January 22, 1920 | Lawrence, KS | Missouri | 32–27 |
| 52 | January 23, 1920 | Lawrence, KS | Missouri | 38–16 |
| 53 | February 18, 1920 | Columbia, MO | Missouri | 36–21 |
| 54 | February 19, 1920 | Columbia, MO | Missouri | 31–13 |
| 55 | January 28, 1921 | Columbia, MO | Missouri | 27–22 |
| 56 | January 29, 1921 | Columbia, MO | Missouri | 28–21 |
| 57 | February 25, 1921 | Lawrence, KS | Missouri | 33–17 |
| 58 | February 26, 1921 | Lawrence, KS | Missouri | 41–30 |
| 59 | January 24, 1922 | Lawrence, KS | Missouri | 35–25 |
| 60 | February 21, 1922 | Columbia, MO | Kansas | 26–16 |
| 61 | January 16, 1923 | Columbia, MO | Kansas | 21–19 |
| 62 | February 28, 1923 | Lawrence, KS | Kansas | 33–20 |
| 63 | January 29, 1924 | Lawrence, KS | Kansas | 16–14 |
| 64 | March 1, 1924 | Columbia, MO | Kansas | 30–17 |
| 65 | March 26, 1924 | Kansas City, MO | Kansas | 15–14 |
| 66 | February 14, 1925 | Columbia, MO | Kansas | 23–22 |
| 67 | February 28, 1925 | Lawrence, KS | Kansas | 33–17 |
| 68 | January 22, 1926 | Lawrence, KS | Kansas | 24–15 |
| 69 | February 22, 1926 | Columbia, MO | Kansas | 27–22 |
| 70 | January 29, 1927 | Columbia, MO | Kansas | 40–23 |
| 71 | March 2, 1927 | Lawrence, KS | Kansas | 36–29 |
| 72 | January 10, 1928 | Lawrence, KS | Missouri | 30–22 |
| 73 | February 21, 1928 | Columbia, MO | Missouri | 49–29 |
| 74 | December 22, 1928 | Kansas City, MO | Missouri | 38–31 |
| 75 | January 15, 1929 | Columbia, MO | Missouri | 34–30 |
| 76 | February 20, 1929 | Lawrence, KS | Missouri | 33–20 |
| 77 | December 21, 1929 | Kansas City, MO | Kansas | 17–12 |
| 78 | February 21, 1930 | Columbia, MO | Missouri | 29–18 |
| 79 | March 5, 1930 | Lawrence, KS | Missouri | 23–18 |
| 80 | December 20, 1930 | Kansas City, MO | Kansas | 40–26 |
| 81 | January 29, 1931 | Lawrence, KS | Kansas | 31–13 |
| 82 | February 27, 1931 | Columbia, MO | Missouri | 26–19 |
| 83 | January 30, 1932 | Columbia, MO | Missouri | 26–22 |
| 84 | February 20, 1932 | Lawrence, KS | Kansas | 24–16 |
| 85 | January 19, 1933 | Lawrence, KS | Kansas | 35–27 |
| 86 | February 11, 1933 | Columbia, MO | Missouri | 21–17 |
| 87 | January 16, 1934 | Columbia, MO | Kansas | 27–25 |
| 88 | March 6, 1934 | Lawrence, KS | Kansas | 23–21 |
| 89 | January 7, 1935 | Lawrence, KS | Kansas | 39–29 |
| 90 | January 8, 1935 | Lawrence, KS | Kansas | 36–27 |
| 91 | March 1, 1935 | Columbia, MO | Missouri | 23–21 |
| 92 | March 2, 1935 | Columbia, MO | Missouri | 21–18 |
| 93 | January 15, 1936 | Columbia, MO | Kansas | 29–25 |
| 94 | March 6, 1936 | Lawrence, KS | Kansas | 51–28 |
| 95 | January 16, 1937 | Lawrence, KS | Kansas | 39–27 |
| 96 | March 4, 1937 | Columbia, MO | Kansas | 39–24 |
| 97 | January 19, 1938 | Columbia, MO | Kansas | 37–32 |
| 98 | March 3, 1938 | Lawrence, KS | Kansas | 56–36 |
| 99 | January 18, 1939 | Lawrence, KS | Kansas | 37–32 |
| 100 | March 2, 1939 | Columbia, MO | Missouri | 53–30 |
| 101 | January 18, 1940 | Columbia, MO | Missouri | 42–31 |
| 102 | March 1, 1940 | Lawrence, KS | Kansas | 42–40 |
| 103 | January 16, 1941 | Lawrence, KS | Kansas | 48–41 |
| 104 | February 21, 1941 | Columbia, MO | Kansas | 35–24 |
| 105 | January 14, 1942 | Columbia, MO | Kansas | 48–34 |
| 106 | March 6, 1942 | Lawrence, KS | Kansas | 67–44 |
| 107 | January 6, 1943 | Lawrence, KS | Kansas | 69–44 |
| 108 | March 2, 1943 | Columbia, MO | Kansas | 47–44 |
| 109 | December 30, 1943 | Kansas City, MO | Kansas | 34–27 |
| 110 | January 8, 1944 | Columbia, MO | Missouri | 35–28 |
| 111 | February 26, 1944 | Lawrence, KS | Kansas | 40–27 |
| 112 | December 23, 1944 | Kansas City, MO | Missouri | 48–39 |
| 113 | January 5, 1945 | Columbia, MO | Kansas | 45–28 |
| 114 | February 24, 1945 | Lawrence, KS | Kansas | 64–33 |
| 115 | December 15, 1945 | Kansas City, MO | Kansas | 59–35 |
| 116 | January 7, 1946 | Lawrence, KS | Kansas | 48–36 |
| 117 | February 22, 1946 | Columbia, MO | Kansas | 50–34 |
| 118 | January 8, 1947 | Lawrence, KS | Missouri | 39–34 |
| 119 | March 7, 1947 | Columbia, MO | Kansas | 48–38 |
| 120 | January 17, 1948 | Columbia, MO | Kansas | 58–46 |
| 121 | February 9, 1948 | Lawrence, KS | Missouri | 42–39 |
| 122 | December 28, 1948 | Kansas City, MO | Kansas | 62–50 |
| 123 | January 11, 1949 | Lawrence, KS | Kansas | 42–35 |
| 124 | February 15, 1949 | Columbia, MO | Kansas | 55–37 |
| 125 | January 14, 1950 | Columbia, MO | Kansas | 48–44 |
| 126 | February 17, 1950 | Lawrence, KS | Kansas | 59–52 |
| 127 | January 8, 1951 | Lawrence, KS | Kansas | 61–46 |
| 128 | February 12, 1951 | Columbia, MO | Missouri | 39–38 |
| 129 | December 30, 1951 | Kansas City, MO | Kansas | 75–65 |
| 130 | January 12, 1952 | Columbia, MO | Kansas | 60–59 |
| 131 | February 25, 1952 | Lawrence, KS | Kansas | 65–54 |
| 132 | December 29, 1952 | Kansas City, MO | Kansas | 66–62 |
| 133 | February 7, 1953 | Lawrence, KS | Kansas | 86–62 |
| 134 | March 12, 1953 | Columbia, MO | Kansas | 69–60 |
| 135 | December 29, 1953 | Kansas City, MO | Kansas | 69–67 |
| 136 | January 9, 1954 | Lawrence, KS | Kansas | 86–69 |
| 137 | March 9, 1954 | Columbia, MO | Missouri | 76–67 |

| No. | Date | Location | Winner | Score |
|---|---|---|---|---|
| 138 | January 4, 1955 | Lawrence, KS | Missouri | 76–65 |
| 139 | March 5, 1955 | Columbia, MO | Missouri | 90–71 |
| 140 | December 29, 1955 | Kansas City, MO | Kansas | 73–56 |
| 141 | January 9, 1956 | Columbia, MO | Missouri | 76–54 |
| 142 | February 6, 1956 | Lawrence, KS | Missouri | 85–78 |
| 143 | January 5, 1957 | Lawrence, KS | Kansas | 92–78 |
| 144 | February 16, 1957 | Columbia, MO | Kansas | 91–58 |
| 145 | January 18, 1958 | Columbia, MO | Kansas | 68–54 |
| 146 | February 17, 1958 | Lawrence, KS | Kansas | 84–69 |
| 147 | December 30, 1958 | Kansas City, MO | Kansas | 84–73 |
| 148 | January 10, 1959 | Columbia, MO | Kansas | 69–62 |
| 149 | February 23, 1959 | Lawrence, KS | Kansas | 85–81 |
| 150 | January 16, 1960 | Lawrence, KS | Kansas | 79–63 |
| 151 | February 27, 1960 | Columbia, MO | Kansas | 85–72 |
| 152 | February 13, 1961 | Lawrence, KS | Kansas | 88–73 |
| 153 | March 11, 1961 | Columbia, MO | Missouri | 79–76 |
| 154 | January 13, 1962 | Columbia, MO | Kansas | 65–54 |
| 155 | February 5, 1962 | Lawrence, KS | Missouri | 79–66 |
| 156 | January 14, 1963 | Columbia, MO | Missouri | 62–56 |
| 157 | March 1, 1963 | Lawrence, KS | Kansas | 72–68 |
| 158 | December 30, 1963 | Kansas City, MO | Missouri | 63–61 |
| 159 | February 4, 1964 | Lawrence, KS | Missouri | 59–58 |
| 160 | February 17, 1964 | Columbia, MO | Missouri | 68–60 |
| 161 | January 9, 1965 | Lawrence, KS | Kansas | 73–66 |
| 162 | February 8, 1965 | Columbia, MO | Kansas | 71–60 |
| 163 | February 5, 1966 | Columbia, MO | Kansas | 77–54 |
| 164 | February 15, 1966 | Lawrence, KS | Kansas | 98–54 |
| 165 | January 14, 1967 | Columbia, MO | Kansas | 70–60 |
| 166 | February 25, 1967 | Lawrence, KS | Kansas | 90–55 |
| 167 | December 30, 1967 | Kansas City, MO | Kansas | 63–47 |
| 168 | January 15, 1968 | Lawrence, KS | Missouri | 67–66 |
| 169 | February 20, 1968 | Columbia, MO | Kansas | 74–65 |
| 170 | January 11, 1969 | Columbia, MO | Missouri | 47–46 |
| 171 | February 15, 1969 | Lawrence, KS | Missouri | 56–55 |
| 172 | January 5, 1970 | Columbia, MO | Missouri | 56–53 |
| 173 | February 23, 1970 | Lawrence, KS | Kansas | 63–45 |
| 174 | December 26, 1970 | Kansas City, MO | Kansas | 96–63 |
| 175 | February 20, 1971 | Lawrence, KS | Kansas | 85–66 |
| 176 | March 8, 1971 | Columbia, MO | Kansas | 71–69 |
| 177 | February 1, 1972 | Columbia, MO | Missouri | 64–60 |
| 178 | February 26, 1972 | Lawrence, KS | Kansas | 93–80 |
| 179 | January 20, 1973 | Columbia, MO | Missouri | 75–72 |
| 180 | February 27, 1973 | Lawrence, KS | Missouri | 79–63 |
| 181 | January 29, 1974 | Columbia, MO | Kansas | 80–67 |
| 182 | March 9, 1974 | Lawrence, KS | Kansas | 112–76 |
| 183 | January 18, 1975 | Lawrence, KS | Kansas | 91–86 |
| 184 | February 19, 1975 | Columbia, MO | Missouri | 87–72 |
| 185 | December 30, 1975 | Kansas City, MO | Missouri | 79–69 |
| 186 | January 17, 1976 | Columbia, MO | Missouri | 99–69 |
| 187 | February 18, 1976 | Lawrence, KS | Missouri | 61–60 |
| 188 | December 30, 1976 | Kansas City, MO | Missouri | 69–65 |
| 189 | January 8, 1977 | Lawrence, KS | Kansas | 77–72 |
| 190 | February 9, 1977 | Columbia, MO | Missouri | 87–79 |
| 191 | December 28, 1977 | Kansas City, MO | Kansas | 96–49 |
| 192 | January 7, 1978 | Columbia, MO | Kansas | 71–67 |
| 193 | February 8, 1978 | Lawrence, KS | Kansas | 72–52 |
| 194 | January 17, 1979 | Lawrence, KS | Missouri | 58–55 |
| 195 | February 7, 1979 | Columbia, MO | Kansas | 88–85 |
| 196 | March 2, 1979 | Kansas City, MO | Kansas | 76–73 |
| 197 | January 9, 1980 | Lawrence, KS | Kansas | 69–66 |
| 198 | February 9, 1980 | Columbia, MO | Missouri | 88–65 |
| 199 | February 29, 1980 | Kansas City, MO | Kansas | 80–71 |
| 200 | January 21, 1981 | Lawrence, KS | Kansas | 63–55 |
| 201 | February 9, 1981 | Columbia, MO | Missouri | 79–65 |
| 202 | March 6, 1981 | Kansas City, MO | Kansas | 75–70 |
| 203 | January 20, 1982 | Columbia, MO | Missouri | 41–35 |
| 204 | February 9, 1982 | Lawrence, KS | Missouri | 42–41 |
| 205 | January 26, 1983 | Lawrence, KS | Missouri | 76–63 |
| 206 | February 17, 1983 | Columbia, MO | Missouri | 74–69 |
| 207 | January 18, 1984 | Lawrence, KS | Kansas | 73–56 |
| 208 | February 18, 1984 | Columbia, MO | Kansas | 72–62 |
| 209 | January 22, 1985 | Lawrence, KS | Kansas | 70–68 |
| 210 | February 12, 1985 | Columbia, MO | Missouri | 62–55 |
| 211 | January 23, 1986 | Columbia, MO | Kansas | 81–77 |
| 212 | February 11, 1986 | Lawrence, KS | Kansas | 100–66 |
| 213 | January 20, 1987 | Lawrence, KS | Kansas | 71–70 |
| 214 | February 11, 1987 | Columbia, MO | Missouri | 63–60 |
| 215 | March 8, 1987 | Kansas City, MO | Missouri | 67–65 |
| 216 | January 9, 1988 | Lawrence, KS | Kansas | 78–74 |
| 217 | February 27, 1988 | Columbia, MO | Kansas | 82–77 |
| 218 | February 1, 1989 | Lawrence, KS | Missouri | 91–66 |
| 219 | February 11, 1989 | Columbia, MO | Missouri | 93–80 |
| 220 | January 20, 1990 | Columbia, MO | Missouri | 95–87 |
| 221 | February 13, 1990 | Lawrence, KS | Missouri | 77–71 |
| 222 | January 19, 1991 | Lawrence, KS | Kansas | 91–64 |
| 223 | February 12, 1991 | Columbia, MO | Kansas | 74–70 |
| 224 | January 13, 1992 | Columbia, MO | Kansas | 92–80 |
| 225 | March 8, 1992 | Lawrence, KS | Kansas | 97–89 |
| 226 | February 1, 1993 | Lawrence, KS | Kansas | 86–69 |
| 227 | February 13, 1993 | Columbia, MO | Kansas | 67–63 |
| 228 | January 31, 1994 | Columbia, MO | Missouri | 79–67 |
| 229 | February 20, 1994 | Lawrence, KS | Missouri | 81–74 |
| 230 | January 9, 1995 | Columbia, MO | Kansas | 102–89 |
| 231 | February 25, 1995 | Lawrence, KS | Kansas | 88–69 |
| 232 | February 10, 1996 | Columbia, MO | Missouri | 77–73 |
| 233 | February 26, 1996 | Lawrence, KS | Kansas | 87–65 |
| 234 | February 4, 1997 | Columbia, MO | Missouri | 96–94 |
| 235 | February 17, 1997 | Lawrence, KS | Kansas | 79–67 |
| 236 | March 9, 1997 | Kansas City, MO | Kansas | 87–60 |
| 237 | January 19, 1998 | Columbia, MO | Missouri | 74–73 |
| 238 | February 8, 1998 | Lawrence, KS | Kansas | 80–70 |
| 239 | January 11, 1999 | Columbia, MO | Kansas | 73–61 |
| 240 | January 24, 1999 | Lawrence, KS | Missouri | 71–63 |
| 241 | January 22, 2000 | Columbia, MO | Missouri | 81–59 |
| 242 | March 5, 2000 | Lawrence, KS | Kansas | 83–82 |
| 243 | January 29, 2001 | Columbia, MO | Missouri | 75–66 |
| 244 | March 4, 2001 | Lawrence, KS | Kansas | 75–59 |
| 245 | January 28, 2002 | Lawrence, KS | Kansas | 105–73 |
| 246 | March 3, 2002 | Columbia, MO | Kansas | 95–92 |
| 247 | February 3, 2003 | Lawrence, KS | Kansas | 76–70 |
| 248 | March 9, 2003 | Columbia, MO | Kansas | 79–74 |
| 249 | March 15, 2003 | Dallas, Texas | Missouri | 68–63 |
| 250 | February 2, 2004 | Lawrence, KS | Kansas | 65–56 |
| 251 | March 7, 2004 | Columbia, MO | Kansas | 84–82 |
| 252 | March 15, 2004 | Dallas, TX | Kansas | 94–69 |
| 253 | January 31, 2005 | Lawrence, KS | Kansas | 73–61 |
| 254 | March 6, 2005 | Columbia, MO | Missouri | 72–68 |
| 255 | January 16, 2006 | Columbia, MO | Missouri | 89–86 |
| 256 | February 18, 2006 | Lawrence, KS | Kansas | 79–46 |
| 257 | January 15, 2007 | Lawrence, KS | Kansas | 80–77 |
| 258 | February 10, 2007 | Columbia, MO | Kansas | 92–74 |
| 259 | January 19, 2008 | Columbia, MO | Kansas | 76–70 |
| 260 | February 4, 2008 | Lawrence, KS | Kansas | 90–71 |
| 261 | February 9, 2009 | Columbia, MO | Missouri | 62–60 |
| 262 | March 1, 2009 | Lawrence, KS | Kansas | 90–65 |
| 263 | January 25, 2010 | Lawrence, KS | Kansas | 84–65 |
| 264 | March 6, 2010 | Columbia, MO | Kansas | 77–56 |
| 265 | February 7, 2011 | Lawrence, KS | Kansas | 103–86 |
| 266 | March 5, 2011 | Columbia, MO | Kansas | 70–66 |
| 267 | February 4, 2012 | Columbia, MO | Missouri | 74–71 |
| 268 | February 25, 2012 | Lawrence, KS | Kansas | 87–86 |
| 269 | December 11, 2021 | Lawrence, KS | Kansas | 102–65 |
| 270 | December 10, 2022 | Columbia, MO | Kansas | 95–67 |
| 271 | December 9, 2023 | Lawrence, KS | Kansas | 73–64 |
| 272 | December 8, 2024 | Columbia, MO | Missouri | 76–67 |
| 273 | December 7, 2025 | Kansas City, MO | Kansas | 80–60 |
Series: Kansas leads 177–96

Upcoming games

| Date | Home team | Away team | Arena |
|---|---|---|---|
| 2026 | Missouri | Kansas | T-Mobile Center |

== Football ==
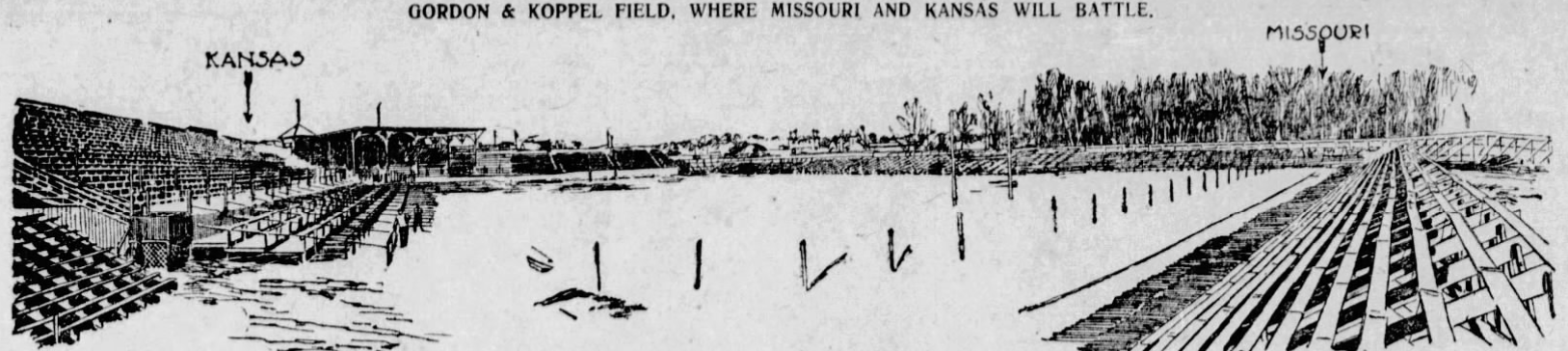
Sketch prior to 1910 game at Gordon and Koppel Field in Kansas City

When the series ended in 2011, it was the second-most-played rivalry in Division I-A (FBS) football history, with 120 games played. It has since fallen behind several other conference rivalries, but still currently is tied for 12th-most played in the FBS. The teams first met on October 31, 1891. After the 1918 game was cancelled due to the 1918 flu pandemic the teams met on the field 93 years in a row, from 1919 to 2011. Missouri leads the series, claiming a 58–54–9 record (as the 1960 game is disputed, Kansas' claimed record is 55–57–9).

- The Tigers and Jayhawks first met on the gridiron on Halloween in 1891 in Kansas City, Missouri. The Jayhawks pulled out a 22–10 win in that first game.
- In 1909–10, both squads entered the game undefeated (Missouri at 6–0–1, and Kansas at 8–0). Two dropkick field goals propelled the Tigers to a 12–6 victory, an undefeated season, and a Missouri Valley title.
- The NCAA recognizes the University of Missouri as the birthplace of homecoming and the 1911 football game in Columbia, Missouri, as the world's first homecoming. The game was "broadcast" by telegraph to over 1,000 fans in Lawrence.
- 19 of the first 20 games were played in Kansas City, with the 1907 contest played in St. Joseph. In 1911, the game began to be played on the respective college campuses, where it would be played (with the exception of 1944 and 1945, when it was played in Kansas City, Missouri) for the next 94 years. The 1911 game was played in Columbia, Missouri, and alumni from MU were asked to "come home" to Rollins Field, giving rise to the tradition of homecoming. That first homecoming game resulted in a 3–3 tie between the schools.
- Kansas held the early advantage in the series, with a 14–4–4 advantage from 1891 through 1922. The Tigers rebounded with a 10–5–1 record in the next 16 years, but Kansas led 5–0–1 during the next 6 years (1939–44), holding the Tigers scoreless each year.
- The Tigers led the series for the next 36 years from 1945 through 1980, holding an advantage over Kansas of 20–13–3. During that period, Kansas had two different 3-game winning streaks, while Missouri held winning streaks of 5 games, 4 games, and 3 games (3 times).
- Since 1981, Kansas led the series over Missouri, holding a 16–14 edge. Since the inception of the Big 12 the series is tied at 7–7. With their 35–7 victory in 2010, Missouri won the latest game.

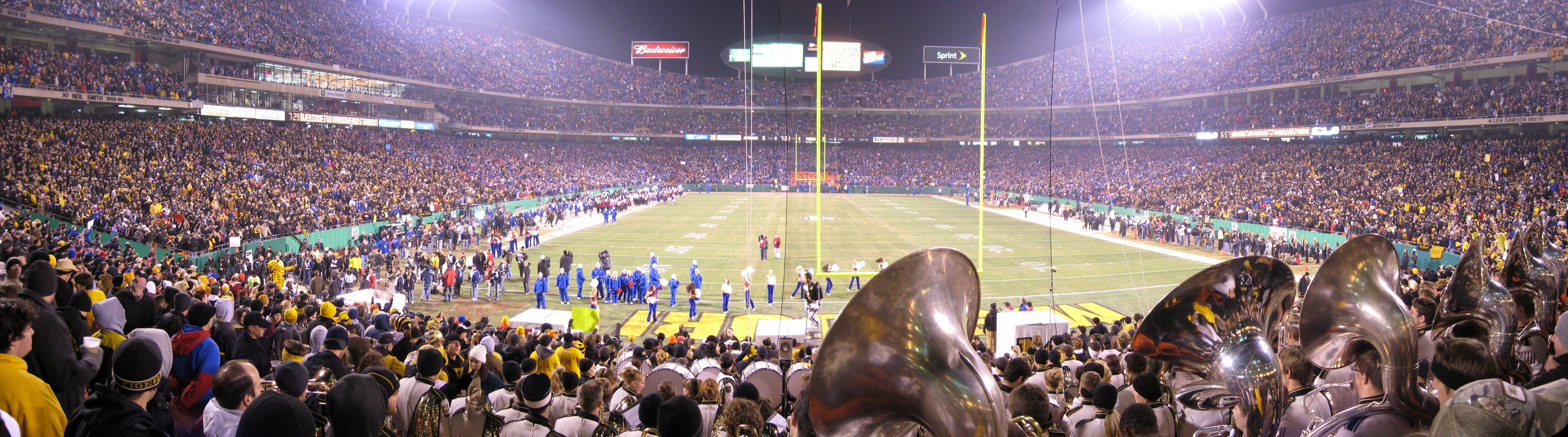
The 2007 Border War game between Missouri and Kansas at Arrowhead Stadium

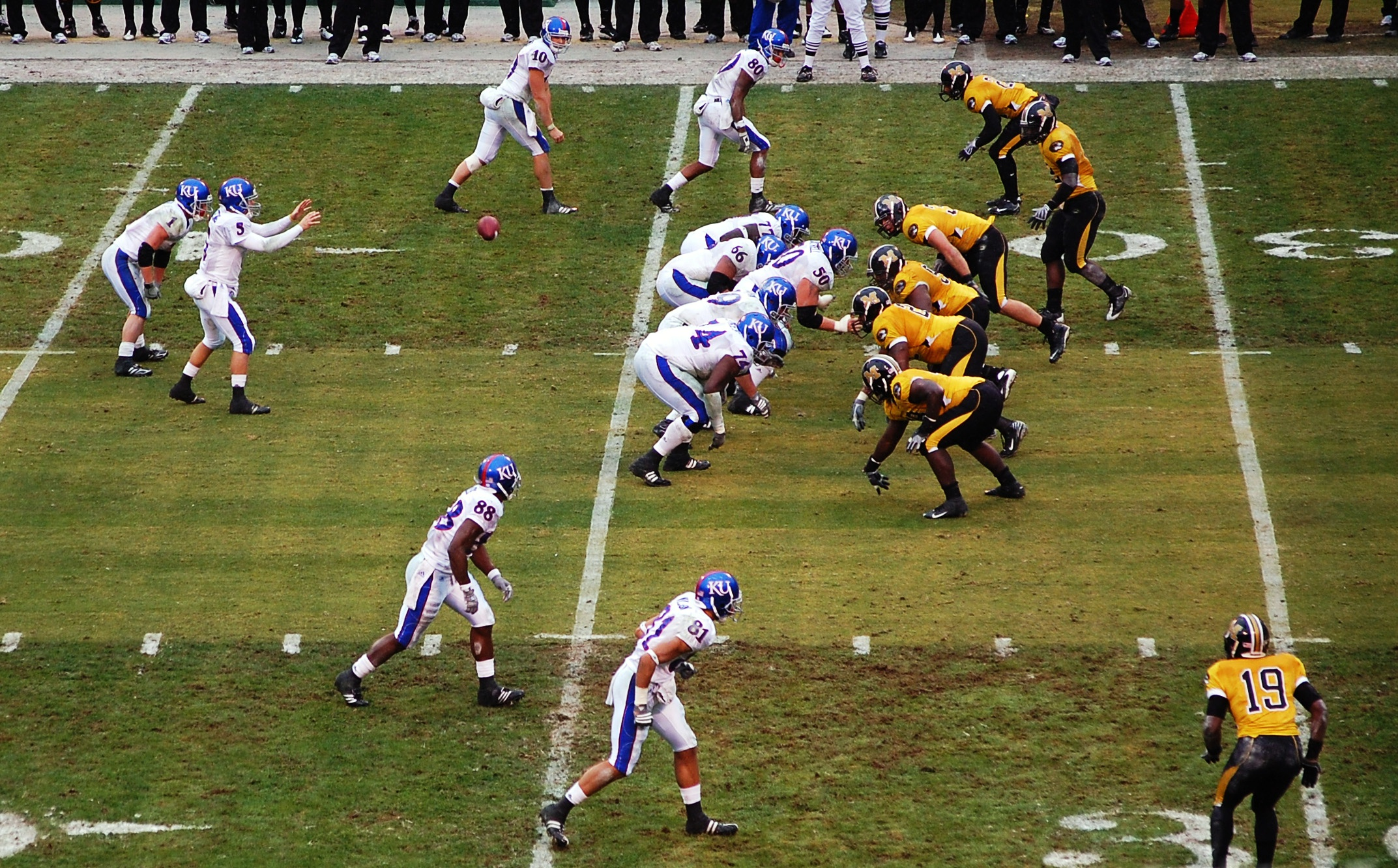
Kansas Jayhawks vs. Missouri Tigers at Arrowhead Stadium on November 29, 2008

- In late 2006, the schools signed a two-year agreement to play the game at Arrowhead Stadium in Kansas City. In 2008 the Arrowhead series was renewed through 2012.
- In the 2007 edition of the game on November 24, 2007, the two teams entered the game ranked in the top five in the nation: Kansas at #2 and Missouri at #3. On the heels of #1 LSU's loss the day before, Missouri won the game 36–28, thereby ending the regular season ranked #1 in the nation in both the Bowl Championship Series and Associated Press polls. The game at Arrowhead Stadium in Kansas City, with a near-record 80,537 people (the second-largest crowd in stadium history) in attendance. As the potential for a top-5 matchup between the two teams seemed probable the game was flexed from day to night so it could be broadcast nationally on ABC's Saturday Night Football. The telecast drew the largest TV audience of any 2007 regular season game.
- On November 26, 2011, the final Border War was played at Arrowhead Stadium as the Missouri Tigers announced that they would be moving to the SEC effective July 1, 2012. Missouri won the final Border War game, 24–10.
- In 2020, an agreement was made for football games to be played in 2025, 2026, 2031, and 2032. Missouri is scheduled to be the home team in odd-numbered years, while Kansas will host in even-numbered years.
- In 2025, the rivalry continued with Missouri beating Kansas 42–31 in Columbia, MO.

=== Indian War Drum ===
The winner of the football game receives the informally arranged Indian War Drum traveling trophy.

The drum trophy originated in 1937 when MU's Kansas City Alumni Association in cooperation with the Kansas University Lettermen's Association decided to present an authentic Native American tom-tom drum each Thanksgiving to the winner of the Kansas-Missouri football game. The decision was finalized at annual Homecoming luncheon of the M Men's Club at Rothwell Gymnasium on November 13, 1937. The MU Kansas City Alumni Association made arrangements for the drum to be built by Osage Indians, because they represented the states more than other tribes. The drum remained in Missouri's possession for the first few years until the trophy was briefly forgotten during wartime. The tradition resumed on an annual basis in 1947, and the MU and KU circles of Omicron Delta Kappa served as caretakers of the drum throughout most of its history.

When the trophy disappeared in the 1980s, the Taos Indians of New Mexico built a new one. The original trophy was later recovered in a Read Hall basement in Columbia under a pile of boxes. It is now located in the College Football Hall of Fame.

In 1999, at Kansas's insistence, the drum was replaced again with a bass drum. The second drum became the property of the Mizzou Alumni Association.

The Kansas and Missouri athletics and alumni associations' logos are on opposite ends. While in Missouri, the Alumni Association Student Board keeps the trophy. While in Kansas, it is kept by the Student Alumni Association in the Booth Family Hall of Fame.

=== Lamar Hunt Trophy ===
Beginning with the 2007 game, the winner also receives the Lamar Hunt Trophy, named in honor of Kansas City Chiefs owner Lamar Hunt, who long envisioned bringing the games to Arrowhead. This should not be confused with the Lamar Hunt Trophy, which is presented to the NFL's AFC champion each year.

=== 1960 controversy ===
While both schools agree that Missouri leads the series, they do not agree on the overall record. Missouri claims an overall lead of 59–54–9, while Kansas claims that Missouri leads 58–55–9 all-time. The dispute centers around the 1960 game. Kansas won the game on the field, but the Big Eight retroactively forfeited the game to Missouri due to Kansas player Bert Coan being voted ineligible following the 1960 season. However, due to an NCAA rule stating that forfeits are not recorded as losses, the NCAA official record books still credit the game to Kansas, and several other publications have followed suit.

Going into the 1960 game, Missouri (9–0, #1 nationally ranked) was known for their very stingy defense that, until giving up 19 points to Oklahoma the week before the Border War match-up, had not allowed a team to reach double digits all season. They boasted three shutouts. Their offense relied heavily on a wide sweep to the right with speedsters Norris Stevenson and Mel West in the backfield. It was run out of a combination of the T-formation and the old Single Wing. The term "student body right" is often used to describe the USC sweep play in the mid to late 1960s, but that phrase was created to describe Missouri's wide sweep. Kansas (6–2, ranked #11, with their 2 losses coming to #1 Syracuse, 14–7, and at #1 Iowa, 21–7) was making history that day by becoming the first team to face three #1 teams in the same season. Kansas had a pretty good defense of their own, surrendering a mere 9.1 points per game with two shutouts that season. Kansas was also loaded in the backfield. Even without Coan, Kansas's backfield consisted of three future NFL draft picks: two-time All-American John Hadl at QB had led the Big 8 in all-purpose yardage as a RB in the 1959 season; halfback Curtis McClinton (three-time All-Big 8), and Doyle Schick at fullback.

On November 19, 1960, in front of a then-record crowd of 43,000 in Columbia, Kansas won the game against Missouri by a score of 23–7. The defenses lived up to their billing, leading to a scoreless tie at the half. Kansas had threatened twice in the first half, but had turned the ball over on downs after Missouri's defense made a formidable goal line stand. Later, after advancing to Missouri's 12, Missouri's defense again tightened, sacking Hadl for a huge loss, and Kansas missed the ensuing FG. Missouri never threatened on offense in the first half. The Kansas defense was keying hard on the sweep. In fact, it wasn't until midway through the 3rd quarter that Missouri was even able to achieve a first down. Even then, Missouri didn't achieve their 2nd first down until the fourth quarter. Kansas scored first in the second half with a field goal. Then, after a Missouri fumble deep in Tiger territory, Hadl hit Coan on a TD pass. Near the end of the 3rd, Kansas went on the games only sustained drive by either team, 69 yards on 13 plays. It was capped with a 2-yard TD run by Coan. Missouri finally got on the board with 5:24 remaining in the game, making the score 17–7. The final Kansas touchdown came after KU picked off a desperation Missouri pass, and then passed for a score with less than a minute left. Coan clearly played a role in the Kansas victory with 2 touchdowns and 67 yards on 9 carries, but many believe it was the Kansas defense that was the deciding factor. Missouri Coach Dan Devine stated "the better team won", but also cited Coan as a key factor in the game.

With the win, Kansas won its first outright Big Six/Seven/Eight title since 1930. They were slated to represent the Big Eight in the 1961 Orange Bowl. However, on December 8, 1960, the Big Eight conference presidents voted Bert Coan ineligible, on a 5–3 vote. As a result, the 1960 Big Eight title, and the Orange Bowl berth, were forfeited to Missouri.

The background to this ruling was as follows. Coan had transferred to KU in the fall of 1959 from TCU after a reported disagreement with the TCU trainer-track coach. At TCU's urging, the NCAA investigated the matter and it was revealed Coan had taken a plane trip to an all-star game in the summer of 1959, paid for by KU donor and AFL co-founder Bud Adams. On October 26, 1960, KU was placed on 1 year NCAA probation because the NCAA declared that KU alumni indulged in illegal recruiting practices consisting of "excessive entertainment" in the recruitment of Coan. Adams denied he took Coan to the game as a recruit. Initially, Coan also denied any impropriety in his transfer to KU, but later in a 2007 interview he admitted he had indeed been illegally recruited by Adams. No KU officials were ever found to be directly involved in the ordeal. While Coan was not ruled ineligible by the NCAA, the NCAA finding triggered questions of Coan's eligibility in light of conference rules. One conference rule banned off-campus recruiting trips; another rule specified that any athlete recruited in violation of the ban would be ineligible. After KU was placed on NCAA probation, KU received a phone call from the University of Nebraska, their next conference opponent, questioning Coan's eligibility. It is alleged Nebraska had earlier received a letter from Missouri's Don Faurot concerning Coan. KU sought to obtain a ruling from the conference at that time, but was instead told the matter would be taken up at the post-season conference meeting. KU took the position that the NCAA had mistakenly concluded Coan was a prospective student-athlete at the time of the trip with Adams and that the coaching staff had not participated in an off-campus recruiting trip and thus had not violated the rule. So KU concluded there had been no infraction of conference rules. Coan did not play in KU's game against Nebraska however, due to injury.

At the post-season conference meeting in December, allegedly at the behest of MU's Don Faurot, but in accordance with the conference's response to KU's inquiry in November, the Big 8 faculty committee took up the issue of Bert Coan. Based upon the NCAA's ruling that a representative of KU's athletic interests, Bud Adams, had transported Coan from his home in Texas to Chicago to view a football all-star game, the conference's members ruled, by a vote of 5–3, that KU had violated a conference ban on off-campus recruiting. By conference rule, any student-athlete that was recruited in violation of this ban was automatically ineligible. The committee accordingly took up the matter of the period in which Coan would be ineligible. The committee initially defeated two separate motions to declare Coan ineligible for the entire 1961 season, before finally declaring him ineligible for a period of one year starting from the date of the NCAA finding by a vote of 6–2. The Big 8 then ordered KU to forfeit the two games in which Coan had played following the NCAA finding (versus Colorado and Missouri). By virtue of the forfeits, the conference championship was awarded to Missouri.

Despite the Big 8's official ruling on the matter, the reactions from many on all sides were not in agreement with the Big 8 committee in the end. When asked at the Look All-America gathering in New York City Missouri All-American, Danny LaRose said, "It'll always be a 9–1 season as far as I'm concerned. And I think the other players will feel that way, too." However, LaRose also expressed his admiration of the Big Eight "for standing up for what was right—enforcing its own rules". Also at the gathering, Colorado All-American guard Joe Romig echoed similar feelings when he said, "I don't care what the NCAA or the Big Eight does. We lost the game at Kansas. Nothing will change that." Meanwhile, Kansas All-American quarterback John Hadl expressed more concern about his teammate when asked at the All-America gathering and had this to say, "He's a good guy. I hope it doesn't hit him too hard." Missouri head coach Dan Devine expressed his apparent disappointment in the process adopted by the Big 8 when he said, "This is the worst thing that could happen in inter-collegiate athletics. I mean the fact that they were playing a boy not knowing he was ineligible. That should have been determined before he played." For his part then executive secretary of the Big 8, Reaves Peters, said the case was the "toughest case to come before us in history".

KU protested the Big 8 conference ruling primarily on the basis that Coan was not recruited during his trip with the KU booster. Despite the fact that Coan later admitted he had been recruited by Adams during the trip, thus invalidating KU's objection, KU continues to defy the conference ruling in claiming the game as a win.

In documenting the game as a win, MU adheres to the Conference determination. KU relies on the actual on the field results of the game as well as the record keeping by the NCAA, which never ruled on the Conference determination one way or the other. Colorado does not count this forfeit as a win in their record books. Kansas fans also cite a 1999 NCAA subcommittee to defend KU's position, where the subcommittee stated, "forfeited contests do not count as a loss and that the game will stand as played on the field." While KU claims the MU game as a win, they do not claim the conference championship that the conference also ordered them to forfeit.

Ultimately the on-field loss to Kansas cost Missouri the 1960 national championship. The final AP poll was released one week after the game (before the Coan decision) and the 8–1 Minnesota Golden Gophers took Missouri's spot at number one in the poll, giving them the AP National Championship. Missouri went on to finish the 1960 season by defeating Navy in the Orange Bowl, giving them a record of 11–0, while Minnesota finished 8–2 with a loss in the Rose Bowl.

=== Football game results ===
- Largest KU win: 32 pts (1930)
- Largest MU win: 48 pts (4 times 1969, 1978, 1979, 1986)

| Kansas victories | Missouri victories | Tie games | Disputed |

| No. | Date | Location | Winner | Score |
|---|---|---|---|---|
| 1 | October 31, 1891 | Kansas City, MO | Kansas | 22–10 |
| 2 | November 24, 1892 | Kansas City, MO | Kansas | 12–4 |
| 3 | November 29, 1893 | Kansas City, MO | Missouri | 12–4 |
| 4 | November 29, 1894 | Kansas City, MO | Kansas | 18–12 |
| 5 | November 28, 1895 | Kansas City, MO | Missouri | 10–6 |
| 6 | November 26, 1896 | Kansas City, MO | Kansas | 30–0 |
| 7 | November 25, 1897 | Kansas City, MO | Kansas | 16–0 |
| 8 | November 24, 1898 | Kansas City, MO | Kansas | 12–0 |
| 9 | November 30, 1899 | Kansas City, MO | Kansas | 34–6 |
| 10 | November 29, 1900 | Kansas City, MO | Tie | 6–6 |
| 11 | November 28, 1901 | Kansas City, MO | Missouri | 18–12 |
| 12 | November 29, 1902 | Kansas City, MO | Kansas | 17–5 |
| 13 | November 26, 1903 | Kansas City, MO | Kansas | 5–0 |
| 14 | November 25, 1904 | Kansas City, MO | Kansas | 29–0 |
| 15 | November 30, 1905 | Kansas City, MO | Kansas | 24–0 |
| 16 | November 29, 1906 | Kansas City, MO | Tie | 0–0 |
| 17 | November 28, 1907 | St. Joseph, MO | Kansas | 4–0 |
| 18 | November 28, 1908 | Kansas City, MO | Kansas | 10–4 |
| 19 | November 25, 1909 | Kansas City, MO | Missouri | 12–6 |
| 20 | November 24, 1910 | Kansas City, MO | Tie | 5–5 |
| 21 | November 25, 1911 | Columbia, MO | Tie | 3–3 |
| 22 | November 23, 1912 | Lawrence, KS | Kansas | 12–3 |
| 23 | November 22, 1913 | Columbia, MO | Missouri | 3–0 |
| 24 | November 21, 1914 | Lawrence, KS | Missouri | 10–7 |
| 25 | November 25, 1915 | Columbia, MO | Kansas | 8–6 |
| 26 | November 30, 1916 | Lawrence, KS | Missouri | 13–0 |
| 27 | November 29, 1917 | Columbia, MO | Kansas | 27–3 |
| 28 | November 29, 1919 | Lawrence, KS | Missouri | 13–6 |
| 29 | November 27, 1920 | Columbia, MO | Missouri | 16–7 |
| 30 | November 24, 1921 | Lawrence, KS | Kansas | 15–9 |
| 31 | November 30, 1922 | Columbia, MO | Missouri | 9–7 |
| 32 | November 29, 1923 | Lawrence, KS | Tie | 3–3 |
| 33 | November 27, 1924 | Columbia, MO | Missouri | 14–0 |
| 34 | November 21, 1925 | Lawrence, KS | Kansas | 10–7 |
| 35 | November 20, 1926 | Columbia, MO | Missouri | 15–0 |
| 36 | November 19, 1927 | Lawrence, KS | Kansas | 14–7 |
| 37 | November 24, 1928 | Columbia, MO | Missouri | 25–6 |
| 38 | November 23, 1929 | Lawrence, KS | Missouri | 7–0 |
| 39 | November 22, 1930 | Columbia, MO | Kansas | 32–0 |
| 40 | November 21, 1931 | Lawrence, KS | Kansas | 14–0 |
| 41 | November 12, 1932 | Columbia, MO | Kansas | 7–0 |
| 42 | November 30, 1933 | Lawrence, KS | Kansas | 27–0 |
| 43 | November 29, 1934 | Columbia, MO | Kansas | 20–0 |
| 44 | November 28, 1935 | Lawrence, KS | Tie | 0–0 |
| 45 | November 26, 1936 | Columbia, MO | Missouri | 19–2 |
| 46 | November 25, 1937 | Lawrence, KS | Tie | 0–0 |
| 47 | November 24, 1938 | Columbia, MO | Missouri | 13–7 |
| 48 | November 25, 1939 | Lawrence, KS | #10 Missouri | 20–0 |
| 49 | November 21, 1940 | Columbia, MO | Missouri | 45–20 |
| 50 | November 22, 1941 | Lawrence, KS | #8 Missouri | 45–6 |
| 51 | November 26, 1942 | Columbia, MO | Missouri | 42–13 |
| 52 | November 20, 1943 | Lawrence, KS | Kansas | 20–9 |
| 53 | November 23, 1944 | Kansas City, MO | Missouri | 28–0 |
| 54 | November 24, 1945 | Kansas City, MO | #16 Missouri | 33–12 |
| 55 | November 28, 1946 | Columbia, MO | Kansas | 20–19 |
| 56 | November 22, 1947 | Lawrence, KS | #17 Kansas | 20–14 |
| 57 | November 25, 1948 | Columbia, MO | Missouri | 21–7 |
| 58 | November 19, 1949 | Lawrence, KS | Missouri | 34–28 |
| 59 | November 23, 1950 | Columbia, MO | Missouri | 20–6 |
| 60 | December 1, 1951 | Lawrence, KS | Kansas | 41–28 |
| 61 | November 22, 1952 | Columbia, MO | Missouri | 20–19 |
| 62 | November 21, 1953 | Lawrence, KS | Missouri | 10–6 |

| No. | Date | Location | Winner | Score |
|---|---|---|---|---|
| 63 | November 20, 1954 | Columbia, MO | Missouri | 41–18 |
| 64 | November 19, 1955 | Lawrence, KS | Kansas | 13–7 |
| 65 | December 1, 1956 | Columbia, MO | Missouri | 15–13 |
| 66 | November 23, 1957 | Lawrence, KS | Kansas | 9–7 |
| 67 | November 22, 1958 | Columbia, MO | Tie | 13–13 |
| 68 | November 21, 1959 | Lawrence, KS | Missouri | 13–9 |
| 69 | November 19, 1960 | Columbia, MO | #1 Missouri | 1–0 |
| 70 | November 25, 1961 | Lawrence, KS | Missouri | 10–7 |
| 71 | November 24, 1962 | Columbia, MO | Tie | 3–3 |
| 72 | November 23, 1963 | Lawrence, KS | Missouri | 9–6 |
| 73 | November 21, 1964 | Columbia, MO | Missouri | 34–14 |
| 74 | November 20, 1965 | Lawrence, KS | #8 Missouri | 44–20 |
| 75 | November 19, 1966 | Columbia, MO | Missouri | 7–0 |
| 76 | November 25, 1967 | Lawrence, KS | Kansas | 17–6 |
| 77 | November 23, 1968 | Columbia, MO | #7 Kansas | 21–19 |
| 78 | November 22, 1969 | Lawrence, KS | #7 Missouri | 69–21 |
| 79 | November 21, 1970 | Columbia, MO | Missouri | 28–17 |
| 80 | November 20, 1971 | Lawrence, KS | Kansas | 7–2 |
| 81 | November 25, 1972 | Columbia, MO | Kansas | 28–17 |
| 82 | November 24, 1973 | Lawrence, KS | #20 Kansas | 14–13 |
| 83 | November 23, 1974 | Columbia, MO | Missouri | 27–3 |
| 84 | November 22, 1975 | Lawrence, KS | Kansas | 42–24 |
| 85 | November 20, 1976 | Columbia, MO | Kansas | 41–14 |
| 86 | November 19, 1977 | Lawrence, KS | Kansas | 24–22 |
| 87 | November 11, 1978 | Columbia, MO | Missouri | 48–0 |
| 88 | November 24, 1979 | Lawrence, KS | Missouri | 55–7 |
| 89 | November 22, 1980 | Columbia, MO | Missouri | 31–6 |
| 90 | November 21, 1981 | Lawrence, KS | Kansas | 19–11 |
| 91 | November 20, 1982 | Columbia, MO | Missouri | 16–10 |
| 92 | November 19, 1983 | Lawrence, KS | Kansas | 37–27 |
| 93 | November 17, 1984 | Columbia, MO | Kansas | 35–21 |
| 94 | November 23, 1985 | Lawrence, KS | Kansas | 34–20 |
| 95 | November 22, 1986 | Columbia, MO | Missouri | 48–0 |
| 96 | November 21, 1987 | Columbia, MO | Missouri | 19–7 |
| 97 | November 19, 1988 | Lawrence, KS | Missouri | 55–17 |
| 98 | November 18, 1989 | Columbia, MO | Kansas | 46–44 |
| 99 | November 17, 1990 | Lawrence, KS | Missouri | 31–21 |
| 100 | November 23, 1991 | Lawrence, KS | Kansas | 53–29 |
| 101 | November 21, 1992 | Columbia, MO | Missouri | 22–17 |
| 102 | November 20, 1993 | Lawrence, KS | Kansas | 28–0 |
| 103 | November 19, 1994 | Columbia, MO | Kansas | 31–14 |
| 104 | November 4, 1995 | Lawrence, KS | #11 Kansas | 42–23 |
| 105 | November 23, 1996 | Columbia, MO | Missouri | 42–25 |
| 106 | September 13, 1997 | Lawrence, KS | Kansas | 15–7 |
| 107 | September 12, 1998 | Columbia, MO | #25 Missouri | 41–23 |
| 108 | October 23, 1999 | Lawrence, KS | Kansas | 21–0 |
| 109 | October 14, 2000 | Columbia, MO | Kansas | 38–17 |
| 110 | October 20, 2001 | Lawrence, KS | Missouri | 38–34 |
| 111 | October 26, 2002 | Columbia, MO | Missouri | 36–12 |
| 112 | September 27, 2003 | Lawrence, KS | Kansas | 35–14 |
| 113 | November 20, 2004 | Columbia, MO | Kansas | 31–14 |
| 114 | October 29, 2005 | Lawrence, KS | Kansas | 13–3 |
| 115 | November 25, 2006 | Columbia, MO | Missouri | 42–17 |
| 116 | November 24, 2007 | Kansas City, MO | #3 Missouri | 36–28 |
| 117 | November 29, 2008 | Kansas City, MO | Kansas | 40–37 |
| 118 | November 28, 2009 | Kansas City, MO | Missouri | 41–39 |
| 119 | November 27, 2010 | Kansas City, MO | #15 Missouri | 35–7 |
| 120 | November 26, 2011 | Kansas City, MO | Missouri | 24–10 |
| 121 | September 6, 2025 | Columbia, MO | Missouri | 42–31 |
| 122 | September 11, 2026 | Lawrence, KS | #23 Missouri | 38–21 |
Series: Missouri leads 59–54–9
† The Big 8 considered the 1960 KU win to be a forfeited loss, while the NCAA recognizes the victory.

Scheduled games

| Date | Home team | Away team | Stadium |
|---|---|---|---|
| September 6, 2031 | Missouri | Kansas | Faurot Field at Memorial Stadium |
| September 11, 2032 | Kansas | Missouri | David Booth Kansas Memorial Stadium |

== Points system ==
Border Showdown
| Missouri (8) | Kansas (2) |
|---|---|
| 2003, 2005; 2007, 2008; 2009, 2010, 2011, 2012 | 2004, 2006 |

Beginning in the 2002–2003 season, the series was memorialized in a sponsored contest, under which points were awarded for athletic contests between the two schools. Only sports where both schools compete are eligible for the contests, and because Kansas fields fewer teams than Missouri, several of Missouri's sports (such as gymnastics, men's swimming and wrestling) do not count in the Border Showdown statistics. Bonus points are awarded for matchups that take place in post-season competition (Big 12 or NCAA tournaments). Between 0.5 and 3.0 points are awarded per matchup, with approximately 24–27 matchups taking place per academic year. The Border Showdown moniker is applied most publicly to the annual football and basketball games. Missouri ended the Showdown series with an 8–2 lead.

The results of the Border Showdown are as follows:

2002–03 MU 32, KU 8.5
2003–04 KU 21.5, MU 18.5
2004–05 MU 22.5, KU 17.5
2005–06 KU 23, MU 17
2006–07 MU 25, KU 14
2007–08 MU 24, KU 15
2008–09 MU 23, KU 17
2009–10 MU 23, KU 16.5
2010–11 MU 23, KU 16
2011–12 MU 31.5, KU 8

== Baseball ==
MU currently leads the baseball series, although the series history is disputed by the two schools. The KU media guide shows that the first game played between the two schools was in 1899, while the first recorded game in the MU media guide was in 1901 (the MU guide lists the entire 1899 season as "unknown"). The KU media guide lists the series with MU ahead 201–137–2 while the MU media guide lists the Tigers ahead 219–129–2. In 2007, the Jayhawks and Tigers added a non-conference game against each other in addition their three-game regular season Big 12 series. The non-conference game was scheduled to be played at Kauffman Stadium in Kansas City, Missouri, home of Major League Baseball's Kansas City Royals. However, the initial meeting was cancelled due to rain. The teams did meet at Kauffman Stadium in 2008, with Kansas winning 3–0. In the 2009 meeting at Kauffman Stadium, Kansas again came away with the victory, 7–3. In the 2010 meeting, Kansas again prevailed, 1–0. In the 2011 meeting, Kansas won, 7–1. The teams met on March 20, 2021, at Hoglund Ballpark in Lawrence. This was their first game since Missouri departed the Big 12. Kansas defeated Missouri 10–9. On the return trip to Columbia later that season, KU again prevailed 9–8. Kansas and Missouri met again in the 2022 season, in which Missouri won 14–6 in Columbia on April 6.

== Post-Big 12 meetings ==
The teams have played against each other twenty-seven times since Missouri moved to the SEC. The most recent matchup was a football game on September 11, 2026, which ended in a Missouri victory. The first matchup as non-conference opponents occurred in 2014 in softball in the 2014 NCAA Division I softball tournament, a game won by Missouri. All subsequent matchups were in tournaments (either postseason or regular season) until the schools' baseball teams played a regular season game in 2021, which was won by Kansas.

| Year | Sport | Home | | Away | | Location | Notes | Ref |
|---|---|---|---|---|---|---|---|---|
| May 17, 2014 | Softball | No. 15 Missouri | 6 | Kansas | 3 | Columbia | 2014 NCAA Division I softball tournament | |
| November 16, 2014 | Soccer | Kansas | 1 | Missouri | 3 | Lawrence | 2014 NCAA Division I Women's Soccer College Cup | |
| May 16, 2015 | Softball | No. 10 Missouri | 5 | Kansas | 3 | Columbia | 2015 NCAA Division I softball tournament | |
| May 17, 2015 | Softball | No. 10 Missouri | 7 | Kansas | 6 | Columbia | 2015 NCAA Division I softball tournament | |
| December 4, 2015 | Volleyball | No. 9 Kansas | 3 | Missouri | 0 | Lawrence | 2015 NCAA Division I women's volleyball tournament | |
| November 13, 2016 | Women's Soccer | Kansas | 1 | Missouri | 0 | Lawrence | 2016 NCAA Division I Women's Soccer Tournament | |
| October 22, 2017 | Men's Basketball | Kansas | 93 | Missouri | 87 | Kansas City | Exhibition (Showdown for Relief) | |
| December 1, 2017 | Volleyball | Kansas | 2 | Missouri | 3 | Wichita | 2017 NCAA Division I women's volleyball tournament | |
| February 10, 2019 | Softball | Kansas | 2 | Missouri | 3 | Tempe | Kajikawa Classic | |
| February 13, 2020 | Softball | Kansas | 0 | Missouri | 8 | Clearwater | St. Peter/Clearwater Invite | |
| March 30, 2021 | Baseball | Kansas | 10 | Missouri | 9 | Lawrence | First regular season meeting in any sport since 2012 | |
| May 18, 2021 | Baseball | Missouri | 8 | Kansas | 9 | Columbia | Return trip of 2-game Home and Home season series | |
| December 11, 2021 | Men's basketball | No. 8 Kansas | 102 | Missouri | 65 | Lawrence | First regular season game since 2012, first of 6 scheduled through 2026. | |
| March 30, 2022 | Softball | Kansas | 11 | Missouri | 7 | Lawrence | Only meeting of the 2022 season | |
| April 6, 2022 | Baseball | Missouri | 14 | Kansas | 6 | Columbia | Only meeting of the 2022 season | |
| September 4, 2022 | Women’s Soccer | Missouri | 2 | Kansas | 1 | Columbia | First regular season match since 2012 | |
| December 10, 2022 | Men's basketball | No. 6 Kansas | 95 | Missouri | 67 | Columbia | First meeting in Columbia since 2012, second of six games scheduled through 2026. | |
| March 20, 2023 | Women's basketball | Kansas | 75 | Missouri | 47 | Lawrence | 2023 Women's NIT, First meeting since 2012 | |
| March 22, 2023 | Baseball | Kansas | 3 | No. 22 Missouri | 8 | Kansas City | Game played as a regular season matchup at Kauffman Stadium | |
| April 19, 2023 | Softball | Missouri | 4 | Kansas | 3 | Columbia | Only matchup of the 2023 season | |
| May 2, 2023 | Baseball | Missouri | 9 | Kansas | 7 | Columbia | Second meeting of 2023 season | |
| September 3, 2023 | Soccer | Kansas | 2 | Missouri | 2 | Lawrence | Second regular season meeting since Missouri left the conference | |
| December 9, 2023 | Men’s Basketball | No. 2 Kansas | 73 | Missouri | 64 | Lawrence | Last meeting in Lawrence for the foreseeable future | |
| March 12, 2024 | Baseball | Kansas | 4 | Missouri | 5 | Lawrence | First meeting of 2024 season | |
| March 19, 2024 | Baseball | Missouri | 3 | Kansas | 4 | Kansas City | Game played as a regular season matchup at Kauffman Stadium and it is the second meeting of 2024 season | |
| March 20, 2024 | Softball | Kansas | 2 | No. 16 Missouri | 3 | Lawrence | Only meeting of the 2024 season | |
| December 8, 2024 | Basketball | Missouri | 76 | No. 1 Kansas | 67 | Columbia | Last meeting in Columbia for the foreseeable future | |
| March 26, 2025 | Softball | Missouri | 0 | Kansas | 3 | Columbia | | |
| April 29, 2025 | Baseball | Kansas | 9 | Missouri | 3 | Lawrence | | |
| May 6, 2025 | Baseball | Missouri | 5 | Kansas | 6 | Columbia | | |
| September 6, 2025 | Football | Missouri | 42 | Kansas | 31 | Columbia | First meeting in football since 2011. | |
| November 15, 2025 | Women's Basketball | Kansas | 82 | Missouri | 77 | Kansas City | First regular season meeting in women's basketball since 2012. | |
| December 7, 2025 | Men's Basketball | Kansas | 80 | Missouri | 60 | Kansas City | | |
| March 18, 2026 | Baseball | Kansas | 10 | Missouri | 0 | Lawrence | | |
| March 31, 2026 | Baseball | Missouri | 8 | Kansas | 11 | Columbia | | |
| April 15, 2026 | Softball | Kansas | 2 | Missouri | 4 | Lawrence | | |
| September 11, 2026 | Football | Kansas | 21 | Missouri | 38 | Lawrence | | |

| Total: | 18–17–1, Mizzou |

Note: For games played at a neutral location, KU is listed as the home team, even though this may not have been the case. This is simply due to lack of information on who was the official home team. Record above does not include exhibition men's basketball game in 2017.

== See also ==
- List of most-played college football series in NCAA Division I
- List of NCAA college football rivalry games
- Timeline of college football in Kansas
