= List of Army Black Knights football seasons =

The following is a list of Army Black Knights football seasons for the football team that represents the United States Military Academy in NCAA competition.

== Seasons ==
Year	Coach	Overall	Conference	Standing	Bowl/playoffs	Coaches^{#}	AP^{°}
Dennis Michie (Independent) (1890)
1890	Dennis Michie	0–1					
Henry L. Williams (Independent) (1891)
1891	Henry L. Williams	4–1–1					
Dennis Michie (Independent) (1892)
1892	Dennis Michie	3–1–1					
Laurie Bliss (Independent) (1893)
1893	Laurie Bliss	4–5					
Harmon S. Graves (Independent) (1894–1896)
1894	Harmon S. Graves	3–2					
1895	Harmon S. Graves	5–2					
1896	Harmon S. Graves	3–2–1					
Herman Koehler (Independent) (1897–1900)
1897	Herman Koehler	6–1–1					
1898	Herman Koehler	3–2–1					
1899	Herman Koehler	4–5					
1900	Herman Koehler	7–3–1					
Leon Kromer (Independent) (1901)
1901	Leon Kromer	5–1–2					
Dennis E. Nolan (Independent) (1902)
1902	Dennis E. Nolan	6–1–1					
Edward Leonard King (Independent) (1903)
1903	Edward Leonard King	6–2–1					
Robert Boyers (Independent) (1904–1905)
1904	Robert Boyers	7–2					
1905	Robert Boyers	4–4–1					
Henry Smither (Independent) (1906–1907)
1906	Henry Smither (Note: Smither was relieved from duty following a 12–0 victory over Tufts in the season opener. Ernest Graves Sr. served as head coach for the remaining eight games of the season, leading Army to a record of 2–5–1.)	3–5–1					
1907	Henry Smither	6–2–1					
Harry Nelly (Independent) (1908–1910)
1908	Harry Nelly	6–1–2					
1909	Harry Nelly	3–2					
1910	Harry Nelly	6–2					
Joseph Beacham (Independent) (1911)
1911	Joseph Beacham	6–1–1					
Ernest Graves Sr. (Independent) (1912)
1912	Ernest Graves Sr.	5–3					
Charles D. Daly (Independent) (1913–1916)
1913	Charles D. Daly	8–1					
1914	Charles D. Daly	9–0					
1915	Charles D. Daly	5–3–1					
1916	Charles D. Daly	9–0					
Geoffrey Keyes (Independent) (1917)
1917	Geoffrey Keyes	7–1					
Hugh Mitchell (Independent) (1918)
1918	Hugh Mitchell	1–0					
Charles D. Daly (Independent) (1919–1922)
1919	Charles D. Daly	6–3					
1920	Charles D. Daly	7–2					
1921	Charles D. Daly	6–4					
1922	Charles D. Daly	8–0–2					
John McEwan (Independent) (1923–1925)
1923	John McEwan	6–2–1					
1924	John McEwan	5–1–2					
1925	John McEwan	7–2					
Biff Jones (Independent) (1926–1929)
1926	Biff Jones	7–1–1					
1927	Biff Jones	9–1					
1928	Biff Jones	8–2					
1929	Biff Jones	6–4–1					
Ralph Sasse (Independent) (1930–1932)
1930	Ralph Sasse	9–1–1					
1931	Ralph Sasse	8–2–1					
1932	Ralph Sasse	8–2					
Garrison H. Davidson (Independent) (1933–1937)
1933	Garrison H. Davidson	9–1					
1934	Garrison H. Davidson	7–3					
1935	Garrison H. Davidson	6–2–1					
1936	Garrison H. Davidson	6–3					
1937	Garrison H. Davidson	7–2					
William H. Wood (Independent) (1938–1940)
1938	William H. Wood	8–2					
1939	William H. Wood	3–4–2					
1940	William H. Wood	1–7–1					
Earl Blaik (Independent) (1941–1958)
1941	Earl Blaik	5–3–1					
1942	Earl Blaik	6–3					
1943	Earl Blaik	7–2–1					11
1944	Earl Blaik	9–0					1
1945	Earl Blaik	9–0					1
1946	Earl Blaik	9–0–1					2
1947	Earl Blaik	5–2–2					11
1948	Earl Blaik	8–0–1					2
1949	Earl Blaik	9–0					4
1950	Earl Blaik	8–1				5	4
1951	Earl Blaik	2–7					
1952	Earl Blaik	4–4–1					
1953	Earl Blaik	7–1–1				16	14
1954	Earl Blaik	7–2				7	7
1955	Earl Blaik	6–3				15	20
1956	Earl Blaik	5–3–1					
1957	Earl Blaik	7–2				13	18
1958	Earl Blaik	8–0–1				3	3
Dale Hall (Independent) (1959–1961)
1959	Dale Hall	4–4–1					
1960	Dale Hall	6–3–1					
1961	Dale Hall	6–4					
Paul Dietzel (Independent) (1962–1965)
1962	Paul Dietzel	6–4					
1963	Paul Dietzel	7–3					
1964	Paul Dietzel	4–6					
1965	Paul Dietzel	4–5–1					
Tom Cahill (Independent) (1966–1973)
1966	Tom Cahill	8–2					
1967	Tom Cahill	8–2					
1968	Tom Cahill	7–3					
1969	Tom Cahill	4–5–1					
1970	Tom Cahill	1–9–1					
1971	Tom Cahill	6–4					
1972	Tom Cahill	6–4					
1973	Tom Cahill	0–10					
Homer Smith (Independent) (1974–1978)
1974	Homer Smith	3–8					
1975	Homer Smith	2–9					
1976	Homer Smith	5–6					
1977	Homer Smith	7–4					
1978	Homer Smith	4–6–1					
Lou Saban (Independent) (1979)
1979	Lou Saban	2–8–1					
Ed Cavanaugh (Independent) (1980–1982)
1980	Ed Cavanaugh	3–7–1					
1981	Ed Cavanugh	3–7–1					
1982	Ed Cavanaugh	4–7					
Jim Young (Independent) (1983–1990)
1983	Jim Young	2–9					
1984	Jim Young	8–3–1			W Cherry		
1985	Jim Young	9–3			W Peach		
1986	Jim Young	6–5					
1987	Jim Young	5–6					
1988	Jim Young	9–3			L Sun		
1989	Jim Young	6–5					
1990	Jim Young	6–5					
Bob Sutton (Independent) (1991–1997)
1991	Bob Sutton	4–7					
1992	Bob Sutton	5–6					
1993	Bob Sutton	6–5					
1994	Bob Sutton	4–7					
1995	Bob Sutton	5–5–1					
1996	Bob Sutton	10–2			L Independence	24	25
1997	Bob Sutton	4–7					
Bob Sutton (Conference USA) (1998–1999)
1998	Bob Sutton	3–8	2–4	T–5th			
1999	Bob Sutton	3–8	1–5	T–7th			
Todd Berry (Conference USA) (2000–2003)
2000	Todd Berry	1–10	1–6	9th			
2001	Todd Berry	3–8	2–5	8th			
2002	Todd Berry	1–11	1–7	10th			
2003	Todd Berry (Note: Todd Berry began the year in his fourth season as the team's head coach. Berry coached the first six games, but was replaced by John Mumford who served as interim head coach for the final seven games.)	0–13	0–8	11th			
Bobby Ross (Conference USA) (2004)
2004	Bobby Ross	2–9	2–6	T–10th			
Bobby Ross (Independent) (2005–2006)
2005	Bobby Ross	4–7					
2006	Bobby Ross	3–9					
Stan Brock (Independent) (2007–2008)
2007	Stan Brock	3–9					
2008	Stan Brock	3–9					
Rich Ellerson (Independent) (2009–2013)
2009	Rich Ellerson	5–7					
2010	Rich Ellerson	7–6			W Armed Forces		
2011	Rich Ellerson	3–9					
2012	Rich Ellerson	2–10					
2013	Rich Ellerson	3–9					
Jeff Monken (Independent) (2014–2023)
2014	Jeff Monken	4–8					
2015	Jeff Monken	2–10					
2016	Jeff Monken	8–5			W Heart of Dallas		
2017	Jeff Monken	10–3			W Armed Forces		
2018	Jeff Monken	11–2			W Armed Forces	20	19
2019	Jeff Monken	5–8					
2020	Jeff Monken	9–3			L Liberty		
2021	Jeff Monken	9–4			W Armed Forces		
2022	Jeff Monken	6–6					
2023	Jeff Monken	6–6					
Jeff Monken (American Conference) (2024–present)
2024	Jeff Monken	12–2	8–0	1st	W Independence	21	21
2025	Jeff Monken	7–6	4–4	T–6th	W Fenway		
2026	Jeff Monken	5–2	4–1				
Total:		751–555–51					
National championship Conference title Conference division title or championship game berth
^{†}Indicates Bowl Coalition, Bowl Alliance, BCS, or CFP / New Years' Six bowl.; ^{#}Rankings from final Coaches Poll.
