= Emory Alvord =

American missionary and agriculturalist

- Born: March 25, 1899; Utah, U.S.
- Died: May 6, 1959 (aged 60); Southern Rhodesia, Federation of Rhodesia and Nyasaland
- Education: Washington State College
- Awards: Officer of the Order of the British Empire
- Scientific career
- Fields: Agricultural Science

Emory Delmont Alvord (March 25, 1899 – May 6, 1959) was an American missionary and agriculturalist. Known for his missionary work in Rhodesia, Alvord's demonstrative methods are credited with revolutionising African agriculture.

== Biography ==
Alvord was born in Utah on March 25, 1899. He studied for a Master of Science degree in agriculture at Washington State College and after graduation worked as a teacher, specialising in agricultural science after 1913. He joined the US Department of Agriculture's Extension Service in 1919. The same year he volunteered to serve as a missionary with the American Board of Commissioners for Foreign Missions (ABCFM) and was sent to the Mount Selinda mission in Chipinge District Rhodesia as an agriculturalist. At Mount Selinda he taught modern agricultural techniques to Africans and introduced terrace farming as a means of preserving soil cover to hillside plots. Some of the European settlers disagreed with Alvord's teachings as they enabled the African population to earn money from cash crops. In 1920 he was asked to help draw up plans for a new state-run agricultural school at Domboshawa. As well as establishing the school Alvord spent some time there training the staff and teaching students about legumes, crop rotation, ploughing, fertilising and row planting.

Alvord's teaching methods, based upon demonstration, were well regarded by the new South Rhodesian state, which sought to increase the output of African-run farms, and in 1926 he was appointed the government's Agriculturalist for the Instruction of Natives. His schools taught Africans modern techniques of irrigation, stock management, soil conservation, village planning and sanitation. There is an often disputed claim that he was the first to introduce the plough to Melsetter District.

In 1944 Alvord became Director of the Department of Native Agriculture. Through this position he was able to implement his demonstrative method throughout the country and promote the centralisation of arable and grazing areas. His influence is regarded as having revolutionised African agriculture. He was recognised by the British state, who appointed him an officer of the Order of the British Empire on June 10, 1948. He retired from government service in 1950 and returned to missionary work with the ABCFM, serving as principal of the Alvord Agricultural School until 1954. From 1954 he was principal of Marandellas School of Agriculture of the Methodist Mission. Alvord died in Southern Rhodesia (then part of the Federation of Rhodesia and Nyasaland) on May 6, 1959.

== Head coaching record ==
Year	Team	Overall	Conference	Standing	Bowl/playoffs
Washington State (Independent) (1918)
1918	Washington State	1–1			
Washington State:		1–1			
Total:		1–1			
