= Dean Cromwell =

American sports coach (1879–1962)

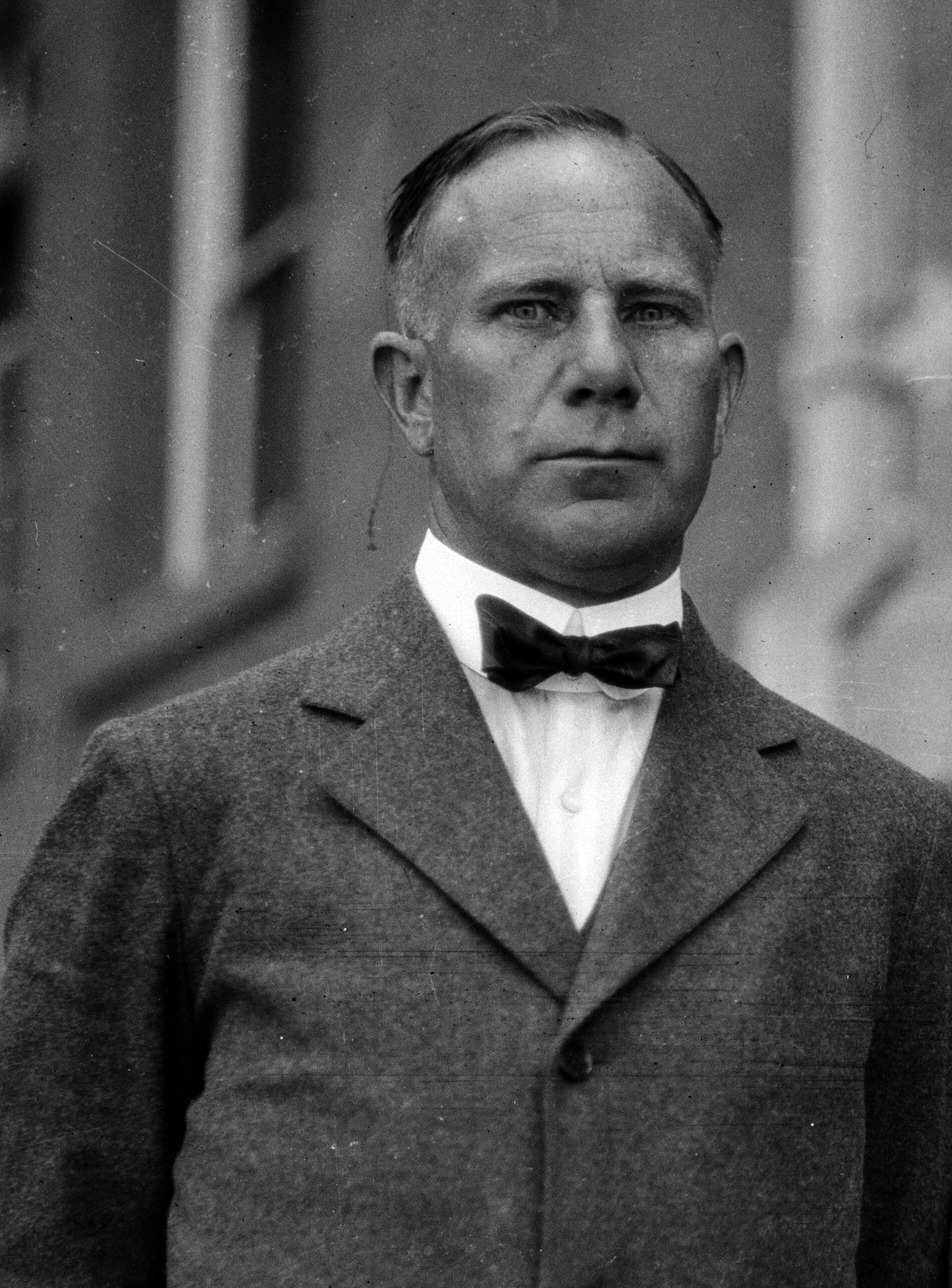
- Cromwell in 1925

Biographical details
- Born: September 20, 1879; Turner, Oregon, U.S.
- Died: August 3, 1962 (aged 82); Los Angeles, California, U.S.
- Education: Occidental College

Coaching career (HC unless noted)

Football
- 1909–1910: USC
- 1916–1918: USC

Basketball
- 1918: USC

Track and field
- 1909–1913: USC
- 1916–1948: [USC

Head coaching record
- Overall: 21–8–6 (football); 0–2 (basketball)

Dean Bartlett Cromwell (September 20, 1879 – August 3, 1962), nicknamed "Maker of Champions", was an American athletic coach in multiple sports, principally at the University of Southern California (USC). He was the head coach of the USC track team from 1909 to 1948, excepting 1914 and 1915, and guided the team to 12 NCAA team national championships (1926, 1930–31, 1935–43) and 34 individual NCAA titles. He was the head coach for the U.S. track team at the 1948 Olympic Games in London, and assistant head coach for the U.S. track team at the 1936 Berlin Olympics.

At the 1936 Berlin Olympics, it is believed he shared some responsibility for the expulsion of the only two Jewish American sprinters (Sam Stoller and Marty Glickman) from the 4x100m relay team, while trying to appease Adolf Hitler.

== Early life ==
Born in Turner, Oregon, Cromwell moved to Southern California with his family as a boy after his father's death, and attended Occidental Prep School and Occidental College, graduating in 1902. While at Occidental, he was a multi-sport standout athlete, playing football and baseball and competing in track and cycling; in 1901 the Helms Athletic Foundation named him the outstanding athlete in Southern California. After college, he worked for the telephone company, also continuing to compete in local amateur sports.

== Career ==
After being hired as USC's track coach, Cromwell became known for his skill in developing star athletes. His many outstanding pupils included Fred Kelly (1912 gold medalist in the 110m hurdles), Charley Paddock (1920 gold medalist in the 100m and 4 × 100 relay), Bud Houser (1924 gold medalist in the shot put and discus; 1928 gold medalist in the discus), Jess Mortensen (1929 NCAA javelin champion, 1931 world record in the decathlon), Frank Wykoff (1928, 1932 and 1936 gold medalist in the 4 × 100 relay), Ken Carpenter (1936 gold medalist in the discus), Earle Meadows (1936 gold medalist in the pole vault), Louis Zamperini (collegiate record-holder in the mile from 1938–53), Wilbur Thompson (1948 gold medalist in the shot put), Cliff Bourland (1948 gold medalist in the 4 × 400 relay), Bill Sefton (two-time world record holder in the pole vault), and Mel Patton (1948 gold medalist in the 200m and 4 × 100 relay). Athletes coached by Cromwell eventually set individual world records in 14 events and relay world records in three others, and won 12 Olympic gold medals during his time at USC.

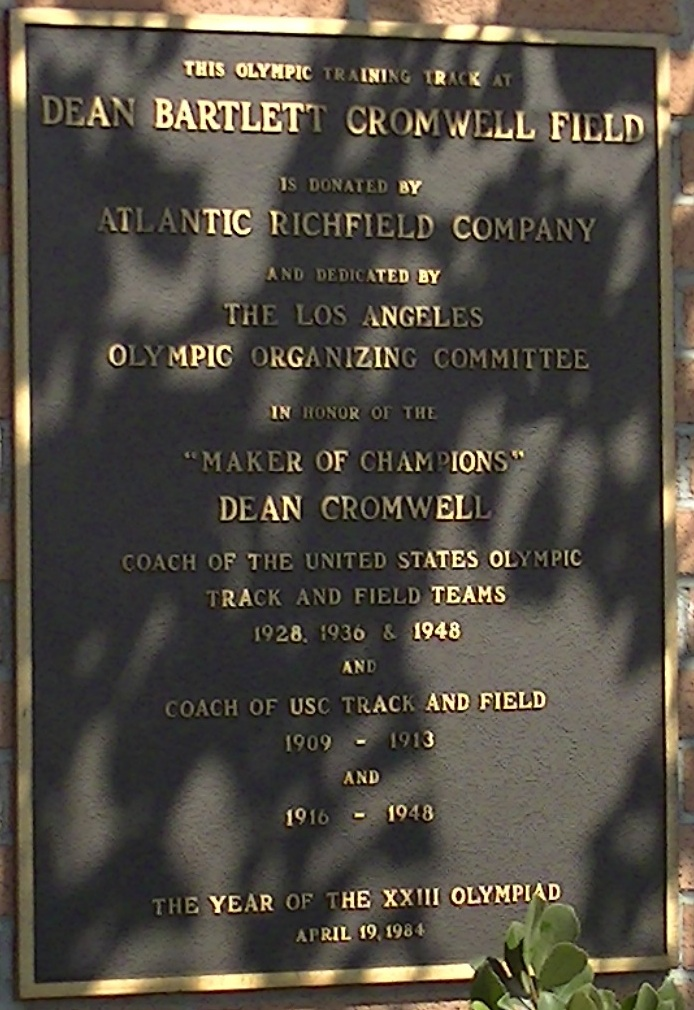
Dean Cromwell plaque at USC's track and field stadium "Cromwell Field"

Cromwell also served as the head coach of the USC Trojans football program from 1909 to 1910, and from 1916 to 1918. His involvement with USC football goes back even farther; he is known to have officiated USC games as early as 1903, and he played (along with the coaches of both teams) for USC opponent Harvard School in a 1905 game due to the weakness of the Harvard roster. In his first term as coach, 1909 to 1910, he posted a record of 10–1–3, but this was exclusively against southern California competition, with no major colleges on the schedule. Like many schools, USC switched from football to rugby, from 1911 to 1913. Cromwell returned as football coach in 1916, by which time USC's teams had begun to be known as the Trojans. By this point, the university was facing competition which more regularly included major colleges such as California, Utah and Stanford, and his relative lack of expertise in the sport was more readily apparent. World War I also depleted the team's ranks in 1917 and 1918. In his final three years his record was still respectable at 11–7–3, though only 4–4–1 against major colleges. In his final season in 1918, USC was 2–2–2. They did not play a home game in Los Angeles until December 14 due to a citywide ban on public gatherings during the Spanish flu epidemic. Cromwell was replaced as head football coach following the season by Gus Henderson. During his tenure, Cromwell compiled a 21–8–6 record. Apart from Sam Barry, who took over the 1941 team in the wake of Howard Jones' death, Cromwell was the last USC football coach for whom it was not his primary sport. He also coached the USC basketball team in 1918, though they only played two games against the Los Angeles Athletic Club, losing both.

After retiring, Cromwell continued to serve as an advisor in track and field, and briefly was the field announcer for the National Football League's Los Angeles Rams. He died at age 82 at his Los Angeles home after suffering a heart attack; he had suffered a previous attack in March of the same year. He was survived by his wife Gertrude and their three sons; his cremated remains were interred at Twin Oaks Cemetery in Turner, Oregon. He was inducted into the National Track & Field Hall of Fame in its inaugural class in 1974, and into the USC Athletic Hall of Fame in its second class in 1995. He is also a member of the Occidental College Track and Field Hall of Fame.

Cromwell can be seen as a contestant on the December 16, 1954 edition of You Bet Your Life (season 5, episode 14).

== Racism and antisemitism ==
In order to curry favor with Avery Brundage, U.S. Olympic Committee Chairman, Cromwell joined the isolationist America First Committee, of which Brundage was a founding member and organizer.

As a coach in Berlin in 1936, Cromwell held the only two Jewish American sprinters — Marty Glickman and Sam Stoller — away from the 4x100m relay team. It is said that he wanted to please Brundage, the head of the United States' National Olympic Committee (NOC), which was then called the American Olympic Committee (AOC), and who was soon the head of the IOC. Brundage was a well-known Nazi supporter, who wanted not to offend Adolf Hitler by being a Jewish emissary. He never regretted his actions.

Despite coaching Jesse Owens in Berlin, Cromwell held racist opinions of African-American athletes. In Championship Technique in Track and Field (1940), he wrote, "The Negro excels in the events he does because he is closer to the primitive than the white man. It was not long ago that his ability to sprint and jump was a life-and-death matter to him in the jungle. His muscles are pliable, and his easygoing disposition is a valuable aid to the mental and physical relaxation that a runner and jumper must have."

USC named its track and field facility Cromwell Field after him, which sparked controversy in 2020. In January 2023, USC announced it would rename the field to Allyson Felix Field, after alumna and 11-time Olympic medalist Allyson Felix.

== Head coaching record ==
=== Football ===
| Year | Team | Overall | Conference | Standing | Bowl/playoffs |
|---|---|---|---|---|---|
USC Methodists (Independent) (1909–1910)
| 1909 | USC | 3–1–2 | | | |
| 1910 | USC | 7–0–1 | | | |
USC Trojans (Independent) (1916–1918)
| 1916 | USC | 5–3 | | | |
| 1917 | USC | 4–2–1 | | | |
| 1918 | USC | 2–2–2 | | | |
| USC: | | 21–8–6 | | | |
| Total: | | 21–8–6 | | | |

== Writings ==
- The High Jump', published in 1939, International Sports, Inc., Indianapolis, Indiana
- Championship Technique In Track And Field, A Book For Athletes, Coaches, And Spectators, written in collaboration with Al Wesson, published in 1941 by Whittlesey House/MaGraw-Hill Book Company, Inc.

== See also ==
- USC Trojans
- List of college football head coaches with non-consecutive tenure
