= Hugh Mitchell =

Hugh Mitchell may refer to:

- Hugh Mitchell (politician) (1907–1996), American politician, U.S. Senator from Washington
- Hugh Mitchell (Scottish footballer) (1849–1937), Scottish member of the Royal Engineers who played in the 1872 FA Cup Final
- Hugh Mitchell (actor) (born 1989), English actor
- Hugh Mitchell (American football) (1890–1967), American football player and coach
- Hugh Mitchell (Australian footballer) (1934–2024), Australian rules footballer and coach
- Hugh Henry Mitchell (1770–1817), British military leader
