= 1918 NYU Violets football team =

American college football season

1918 NYU Violets football
- Conference: Independent
- Record: 0–4
- Head coach: Appleton A. Mason (1st season)
- Home stadium: Ohio Field

1918 Eastern college football independents records
	Conf.			Overall
Team	W	L	T	W		L		T
Bucknell		–		6	–	0	–	0
Princeton		–		3	–	0	–	0
Holy Cross		–		2	–	0	–	0
Army		–		1	–	0	–	0
Buffalo		–		6	–	1	–	0
Columbia		–		5	–	1	–	0
Syracuse		–		5	–	1	–	0
Pittsburgh		–		4	–	1	–	0
Boston College		–		5	–	2	–	0
Rutgers		–		5	–	2	–	0
Franklin & Marshall		–		2	–	1	–	0
Geneva		–		4	–	2	–	0
Swarthmore		–		4	–	2	–	0
Harvard		–		2	–	1	–	0
Fordham		–		4	–	2	–	1
Villanova		–		3	–	2	–	0
Penn		–		5	–	3	–	0
Dartmouth		–		3	–	3	–	0
Lehigh		–		4	–	4	–	0
Washington & Jefferson		–		2	–	2	–	0
New Hampshire		–		2	–	2	–	1
Lafayette		–		3	–	4	–	0
Brown		–		2	–	3	–	0
Tufts		–		2	–	3	–	0
Penn State		–		1	–	2	–	1
Vermont		–		0	–	1	–	1
Drexel		–		0	–	1	–	0
NYU		–		0	–	4	–	0

The 1918 NYU Violets football team was an American football team that represented New York University as an independent during the 1918 college football season. In their first year under head coach Appleton A. Mason, the team compiled a 0–4 record.

== Schedule ==
Date	Opponent	Site	Result	Source
November 2	Camp Merritt	Ohio Field; Bronx, NY	L 0–13	
November 9	Fordham	Ohio Field; Bronx, NY	L 0–7	
November 16	at Maryland State	College Field; College Park, MD	L 3–6	
November 23	at Columbia	South Field; New York, NY	L 0–12	
