= 1918 Princeton Tigers football team =

American college football season

1918 Princeton Tigers football
- Conference: Independent
- Record: 3–0
- Head coach: Keene Fitzpatrick (2nd season)
- Offensive scheme: Short punt
- Home stadium: Palmer Stadium

1918 Eastern college football independents records
	Conf.			Overall
Team	W	L	T	W		L		T
Bucknell		–		6	–	0	–	0
Princeton		–		3	–	0	–	0
Holy Cross		–		2	–	0	–	0
Army		–		1	–	0	–	0
Buffalo		–		6	–	1	–	0
Columbia		–		5	–	1	–	0
Syracuse		–		5	–	1	–	0
Pittsburgh		–		4	–	1	–	0
Boston College		–		5	–	2	–	0
Rutgers		–		5	–	2	–	0
Franklin & Marshall		–		2	–	1	–	0
Geneva		–		4	–	2	–	0
Swarthmore		–		4	–	2	–	0
Harvard		–		2	–	1	–	0
Fordham		–		4	–	2	–	1
Villanova		–		3	–	2	–	0
Penn		–		5	–	3	–	0
Dartmouth		–		3	–	3	–	0
Lehigh		–		4	–	4	–	0
Washington & Jefferson		–		2	–	2	–	0
New Hampshire		–		2	–	2	–	1
Lafayette		–		3	–	4	–	0
Brown		–		2	–	3	–	0
Tufts		–		2	–	3	–	0
Penn State		–		1	–	2	–	1
Vermont		–		0	–	1	–	1
Drexel		–		0	–	1	–	0
NYU		–		0	–	4	–	0

The 1918 Princeton Tigers football team represented Princeton University in the 1918 college football season. The team finished with a 3–0 record under second-year head coach Keene Fitzpatrick, outscoring opponents by a total of 61 to 7 in games against the Navy Pay School, the Government Aero School, and Camp Upton. Princeton quarterback Frank Murrey was selected as a consensus first-team honoree on the 1918 College Football All-America Team.

== Schedule ==
Date	Opponent	Site	Result	Source
October 19	Navy Pay School	Palmer Stadium; Princeton, NJ	W 26–0	
?	Government Aero School	Princeton, NJ	W 7–0	
November 16	Camp Upton	Polo Grounds; New York, NY	W 28–7	
