= Edward Siskind =

American football and basketball coach (1886–1955)

Biographical details
- Born: May 5, 1886; Russian Empire
- Died: July 20, 1955 (aged 69); New Rochelle, New York

Playing career

Football
- 1905–1908: Fordham
- Position: End

Coaching career (HC unless noted)

Football
- 1918: Fordham

Basketball
- 1909–1910: Fordham
- 1918–1919: Fordham

Head coaching record
- Overall: 4–2–1 (football); 40–7 (basketball)

Edward S. Siskind (May 5, 1886 – July 20, 1955) was an American football and basketball coach. After playing end for Fordham's football team, he served as the head football coach at the university in 1918, compiling a record of 16–2–1. Siskind was also the head basketball coach at Fordham in 1909–10 and 1918–19, tallying a mark of 40–7 in two seasons.

== Personal life ==
Siskind ran a sporting goods import store in New York City for 30 years.

== Head coaching record ==
=== Football ===
Year	Team	Overall	Conference	Standing	Bowl/playoffs
Fordham Maroon (Independent) (1918)
1918	Fordham	16–2–1			
Fordham:		16–2–1			
Total:		16–2–1			

=== Basketball ===
Record table
Season	Team	Overall	Conference	Standing	Postseason
Fordham (Independent) (1909–1910)
1909–10	Fordham	16–2			
Fordham (Independent) (1918–1919)
1918–19	Fordham	24–5			
Fordham:		40–7			
Total:		40–7 (.460)			
