= Frank Morrissey =

American football player and coach (1899–1968)

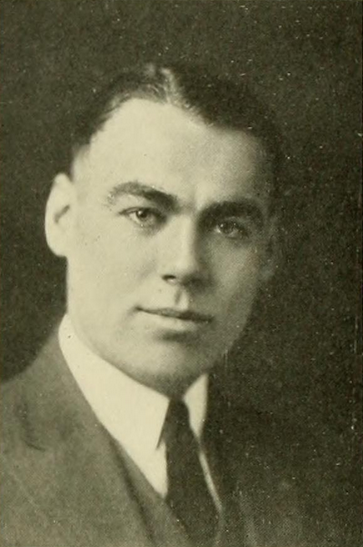
- Morrissey pictured in Sub Turri 1921, Boston College yearbook

Biographical details
- Born: March 11, 1899; Boston, Massachusetts, U.S.
- Died: November 19, 1968 (aged 69); Wynnewood, Pennsylvania, U.S.

Playing career
- 1917–1920: Boston College
- 1921: Tonawanda Kardex
- 1921: Rochester Jeffersons
- 1922–1924: Buffalo All-Americans/Bisons
- 1924: Milwaukee Badgers
- Positions: Guard, tackle

Coaching career (HC unless noted)
- 1918: Boston College
- 1921–1924: Canisius (assistant)

Head coaching record
- Overall: 5–2

Accomplishments and honors

Awards
- Green Bay Press-Gazette 2nd team all-NFL (1923)

Francis Joseph Morrissey (March 11, 1899 – November 19, 1968) was an American football player and coach. He played college football at Boston College from 1917 and 1920 and served as head football coach in 1918.

Morrissey was born in Boston, Massachusetts. After graduating from Medford High School in Medford, Massachusetts, he played football for the Boston College Eagles from 1917 to 1920. Morrissey was the captain of the varsity team from 1918 to 1920 and served as head coach in 1918 when Charles Brickley left BC to join the United States Navy Reserve. Morrissey also played baseball and ice hockey as Boston College.

Morrissey died on November 19, 1968, at Lankenau Hospital in Wynnewood, Pennsylvania.

== Head coaching record ==
Year	Team	Overall	Conference	Standing	Bowl/playoffs
Boston College (Independent) (1918)
1918	Boston College	5–2			
Boston College:		5–2			
Total:		5–2			
