= 1918 Columbia Lions football team =

American college football season

1918 Columbia Lions football
- Conference: Independent
- Record: 5–1
- Head coach: Fred Dawson (1st season)
- Captain: Chester Robb
- Home stadium: South Field

1918 Eastern college football independents records
	Conf.			Overall
Team	W	L	T	W		L		T
Bucknell		–		6	–	0	–	0
Princeton		–		3	–	0	–	0
Holy Cross		–		2	–	0	–	0
Army		–		1	–	0	–	0
Buffalo		–		6	–	1	–	0
Columbia		–		5	–	1	–	0
Syracuse		–		5	–	1	–	0
Pittsburgh		–		4	–	1	–	0
Boston College		–		5	–	2	–	0
Rutgers		–		5	–	2	–	0
Franklin & Marshall		–		2	–	1	–	0
Geneva		–		4	–	2	–	0
Swarthmore		–		4	–	2	–	0
Harvard		–		2	–	1	–	0
Fordham		–		4	–	2	–	1
Villanova		–		3	–	2	–	0
Penn		–		5	–	3	–	0
Dartmouth		–		3	–	3	–	0
Lehigh		–		4	–	4	–	0
Washington & Jefferson		–		2	–	2	–	0
New Hampshire		–		2	–	2	–	1
Lafayette		–		3	–	4	–	0
Brown		–		2	–	3	–	0
Tufts		–		2	–	3	–	0
Penn State		–		1	–	2	–	1
Vermont		–		0	–	1	–	1
Drexel		–		0	–	1	–	0
NYU		–		0	–	4	–	0

The 1918 Columbia Lions football team was an American football team that represented Columbia University as an independent during the 1918 college football season. In his first season, head coach Fred Dawson led the team to a 5–1 record, outscoring opponents 87 to 27.

The team played its home games on South Field, part of the university's campus in Morningside Heights in Upper Manhattan.

== Schedule ==
Date	Opponent	Site	Result	Attendance	Source
October 26	Camp Merritt	South Field; New York, NY	W 7–0		
November 2	Amherst	South Field; New York, NY	W 21–7		
November 9	Union (NY)	South Field; New York, NY	W 33–0		
November 16	Wesleyan	South Field; New York, NY	W 14–0		
November 23	NYU	South Field; New York, NY	W 12–0		
November 28	at Syracuse	Archbold Stadium; Syracuse, NY	L 0–20		
