= 1918 Fordham Maroon football team =

American college football season

1918 Fordham Maroon football
- Conference: Independent
- Record: 16–2–1 / 4–2–1
- Head coach: Edward Siskind (1st season)
- Captain: William Ewing
- Home stadium: Fordham Field

1918 Eastern college football independents records
| | Conf. | | | Overall |
| Team | W | L | T | W | | L | | T |
|---|---|---|---|---|---|---|---|---|
| Bucknell | | – | | 6 | – | 0 | – | 0 |
| Princeton | | – | | 3 | – | 0 | – | 0 |
| Holy Cross | | – | | 2 | – | 0 | – | 0 |
| Army | | – | | 1 | – | 0 | – | 0 |
| Buffalo | | – | | 6 | – | 1 | – | 0 |
| Columbia | | – | | 5 | – | 1 | – | 0 |
| Syracuse | | – | | 5 | – | 1 | – | 0 |
| Pittsburgh | | – | | 4 | – | 1 | – | 0 |
| Boston College | | – | | 5 | – | 2 | – | 0 |
| Rutgers | | – | | 5 | – | 2 | – | 0 |
| Franklin & Marshall | | – | | 2 | – | 1 | – | 0 |
| Geneva | | – | | 4 | – | 2 | – | 0 |
| Swarthmore | | – | | 4 | – | 2 | – | 0 |
| Harvard | | – | | 2 | – | 1 | – | 0 |
| Fordham | | – | | 4 | – | 2 | – | 1 |
| Villanova | | – | | 3 | – | 2 | – | 0 |
| Penn | | – | | 5 | – | 3 | – | 0 |
| Dartmouth | | – | | 3 | – | 3 | – | 0 |
| Lehigh | | – | | 4 | – | 4 | – | 0 |
| Washington & Jefferson | | – | | 2 | – | 2 | – | 0 |
| New Hampshire | | – | | 2 | – | 2 | – | 1 |
| Lafayette | | – | | 3 | – | 4 | – | 0 |
| Brown | | – | | 2 | – | 3 | – | 0 |
| Tufts | | – | | 2 | – | 3 | – | 0 |
| Penn State | | – | | 1 | – | 2 | – | 1 |
| Vermont | | – | | 0 | – | 1 | – | 1 |
| Drexel | | – | | 0 | – | 1 | – | 0 |
| NYU | | – | | 0 | – | 4 | – | 0 |

The 1918 Fordham Maroon football team was an American football team that represented Fordham University as an independent during the 1918 college football season. Fordham claims a 16–2–1 record. College Football Data Warehouse (CFDW) lists the team's record at 4–2–1. Luckyshow also lists the team's record at 4-2-1. Opponents recognized by CFDW are displayed in bold in the schedule chart below.

Edward Siskind, a former Fordham player, was appointed as the head coach.

Left halfback Frankie Frisch, known as "The Fordham Flash", led the team on offense. He later played for 19 years in Major League Baseball from 1919 to 1937 and was inducted into the Baseball Hall of Fame.

== Schedule ==
| Date | Opponent | Site | Result | Source |
|---|---|---|---|---|
| October 30 | **USS Granite State** | Fordham Field; Bronx, NY | W 6–0 | |
| November 2 | **Saint John's (NY)** | Fordham Field; Bronx, NY | W 27–0 | |
| November 9 | at **NYU** | Ohio Field; New York, NY | W 7–0 | |
| November 16 | at **Boston College** | Alumni Field; Chestnut Hill, MA | W 13–0 | |
| November 20 | **Fort Slocum** | Fordham Field; Bronx, NY | T 6–6 | |
| November 23 | at **Camp Merritt** | Hackensack, NJ | L 0–27 | |
| November 28 | **Georgetown** | Fordham Field; Bronx, NY | W 14–0 | |
| | Pelham Bay Naval Reserve | | W 31–7 | |
| | US Training Station, Bayshore | | L 0–10 | |
| | USS Texas | | W 24–0 | |
| | USS Arkansas | | W 30–6 | |
| | USS Wyoming | | W 31–7 | |
| | USS Arkansas | | W 20–0 | |
| | Columbia freshmen | | W 21–14 | |
| | Fordham Prep | | W 10–3 | |
| | Fort HG Wright | | W 7–0 | |
| | New Mexico | | W 28–10 | |
