= 1918 Penn Quakers football team =

American college football season

1918 Penn Quakers football
- Conference: Independent
- Record: 5–3
- Head coach: Bob Folwell (3rd season)
- Captain: James Neylon
- Home stadium: Franklin Field

1918 Eastern college football independents records
	Conf.			Overall
Team	W	L	T	W		L		T
Bucknell		–		6	–	0	–	0
Princeton		–		3	–	0	–	0
Holy Cross		–		2	–	0	–	0
Army		–		1	–	0	–	0
Buffalo		–		6	–	1	–	0
Columbia		–		5	–	1	–	0
Syracuse		–		5	–	1	–	0
Pittsburgh		–		4	–	1	–	0
Boston College		–		5	–	2	–	0
Rutgers		–		5	–	2	–	0
Franklin & Marshall		–		2	–	1	–	0
Geneva		–		4	–	2	–	0
Swarthmore		–		4	–	2	–	0
Harvard		–		2	–	1	–	0
Fordham		–		4	–	2	–	1
Villanova		–		3	–	2	–	0
Penn		–		5	–	3	–	0
Dartmouth		–		3	–	3	–	0
Lehigh		–		4	–	4	–	0
Washington & Jefferson		–		2	–	2	–	0
New Hampshire		–		2	–	2	–	1
Lafayette		–		3	–	4	–	0
Brown		–		2	–	3	–	0
Tufts		–		2	–	3	–	0
Penn State		–		1	–	2	–	1
Vermont		–		0	–	1	–	1
Drexel		–		0	–	1	–	0
NYU		–		0	–	4	–	0

The 1918 Penn Quakers football team represented the University of Pennsylvania as an independent during the 1918 college football season. The 1918 Penn football team was adversely affected by the Spanish flu sweeping through the city. Head coach Bob Folwell was hospitalized. Only 22 of his players were healthy enough to practice at one point in mid-October. Penn's scheduled game against Georgia Tech was canceled. Penn postponed a scheduled game with the Navy Yard's Marines football club. It was rescheduled for October 26 and played at an empty Franklin Field closed to fans to prevent the spread of the virus.

== Schedule ==
Date	Opponent	Site	Result	Attendance	Source
October 19	USS Minnesota	Franklin Field; Philadelphia, PA	W 27–0		
October 26	League Island Marines	Franklin Field; Philadelphia, PA	L 0–7	2,500	
November 2	Swarthmore	Franklin Field; Philadelphia, PA	L 12–20		
November 7	Saint Joseph's	Franklin Field; Philadelphia, PA	W 12–0		
November 9	Lafayette	Franklin Field; Philadelphia, PA	L 34–0		
November 16	at Pittsburgh	Forbes Field; Pittsburgh, PA	L 0–37		
November 23	Swarthmore	Franklin Field; Philadelphia, PA	W 13–7		
November 28	Dartmouth	Franklin Field; Philadelphia, PA	W 21–0		

.
