= 1918 Gonzaga Blue and White football team =

American college football season

1918 Gonzaga Blue and White football
- Conference: Independent
- Record: 0–2–1
- Head coach: C. A. Mullin (1st season)

1918 Western college football independents records
	Conf.			Overall
Team	W	L	T	W		L		T
Hawaii		–		3	–	1	–	0
USC		–		2	–	2	–	2
Washington State		–		1	–	1	–	0
Gonzaga		–		0	–	2	–	1
Saint Mary's		–		0	–	7	–	0

The 1918 Gonzaga Blue and White football team was an American football team that represented Gonzaga University as an independent during the 1918 college football season. In their first and only season under head coach C. A. Mullin, the Blue and White compiled a 0–2–1 record.

== Schedule ==
Date	Opponent	Site	Result	Source
November 16	at Idaho SATC	Moscow, ID	L 7–12	
November 23	Idaho SATC	Spokane, WA	T 7–7	
November 28	at Washington State	Pullman, WA	L 6–20	
