= 1918 Holy Cross football team =

American college football season

1918 Holy Cross football
- Conference: Independent
- Record: 2–0
- Head coach: Bart Sullivan (1st season)
- Captain: None
- Home stadium: Fitton Field

1918 Eastern college football independents records
	Conf.			Overall
Team	W	L	T	W		L		T
Bucknell		–		6	–	0	–	0
Princeton		–		3	–	0	–	0
Holy Cross		–		2	–	0	–	0
Army		–		1	–	0	–	0
Buffalo		–		6	–	1	–	0
Columbia		–		5	–	1	–	0
Syracuse		–		5	–	1	–	0
Pittsburgh		–		4	–	1	–	0
Boston College		–		5	–	2	–	0
Rutgers		–		5	–	2	–	0
Franklin & Marshall		–		2	–	1	–	0
Geneva		–		4	–	2	–	0
Swarthmore		–		4	–	2	–	0
Harvard		–		2	–	1	–	0
Fordham		–		4	–	2	–	1
Villanova		–		3	–	2	–	0
Penn		–		5	–	3	–	0
Dartmouth		–		3	–	3	–	0
Lehigh		–		4	–	4	–	0
Washington & Jefferson		–		2	–	2	–	0
New Hampshire		–		2	–	2	–	1
Lafayette		–		3	–	4	–	0
Brown		–		2	–	3	–	0
Tufts		–		2	–	3	–	0
Penn State		–		1	–	2	–	1
Vermont		–		0	–	1	–	1
Drexel		–		0	–	1	–	0
NYU		–		0	–	4	–	0

The 1918 Holy Cross football team was an American football team that represented the College of the Holy Cross in the 1918 college football season.

In its first and only year under head coach Bart Sullivan, the team compiled a 2–0 record. No team captain was named.

Amid the second-wave Spanish flu outbreak in late summer 1918, Holy Cross started the fall season with no scheduled intercollegiate football games for the first time in more than two decades. Like many New England colleges, Holy Cross did not even organize a football team until mid-October.

Holy Cross played only two games in 1918, with a schedule set by the United Way War Work Fund, and proceeds benefitting the World War I effort.

Holy Cross played both of its games at home, at Fitton Field on the college campus in Worcester, Massachusetts.

== Schedule ==
Date	Opponent	Site	Result	Source
November 16	Worcester Polytechnic	Fitton Field; Worcester, MA	W 27–7	
November 23	Tufts	Fitton Field; Worcester, MA	W 21–7	
