= 1918 Bucknell football team =

American college football season

1918 Bucknell football
- Conference: Independent
- Record: 6–0
- Head coach: Edgar Wingard (1st season)

1918 Eastern college football independents records
	Conf.			Overall
Team	W	L	T	W		L		T
Bucknell		–		6	–	0	–	0
Princeton		–		3	–	0	–	0
Holy Cross		–		2	–	0	–	0
Army		–		1	–	0	–	0
Buffalo		–		6	–	1	–	0
Columbia		–		5	–	1	–	0
Syracuse		–		5	–	1	–	0
Pittsburgh		–		4	–	1	–	0
Boston College		–		5	–	2	–	0
Rutgers		–		5	–	2	–	0
Franklin & Marshall		–		2	–	1	–	0
Geneva		–		4	–	2	–	0
Swarthmore		–		4	–	2	–	0
Harvard		–		2	–	1	–	0
Fordham		–		4	–	2	–	1
Villanova		–		3	–	2	–	0
Penn		–		5	–	3	–	0
Dartmouth		–		3	–	3	–	0
Lehigh		–		4	–	4	–	0
Washington & Jefferson		–		2	–	2	–	0
New Hampshire		–		2	–	2	–	1
Lafayette		–		3	–	4	–	0
Brown		–		2	–	3	–	0
Tufts		–		2	–	3	–	0
Penn State		–		1	–	2	–	1
Vermont		–		0	–	1	–	1
Drexel		–		0	–	1	–	0
NYU		–		0	–	4	–	0

The 1918 Bucknell football team was an American football team that represented Bucknell University as an independent during the 1918 college football season. In its first and only season under head coach Edgar Wingard, the team compiled a 6–0 record, shut out five of six opponents, and outscored all opponents by a total of 236 to 7.

== Schedule ==
Date	Opponent	Site	Result	Attendance	Source
October 12	at Bellefonte Academy	Lewisburg, PA	W 31–0		
November 2	Mount St. Mary's		W 47–0		
November 9	vs. Villanova	Sunbury, PA	W 40–0		
November 16	vs. Gettysburg	Island Park; Harrisburg, PA	W 27–0		
November 23	Susquehanna	Sunbury, PA	W 47–7		
November 28	Dickinson	Lewisburg, PA	W 44–0		
