= 1918 Lehigh Brown and White football team =

American college football season

1918 Lehigh Brown and White football
- Conference: Independent
- Record: 4–4
- Head coach: Tom Keady (7th season)
- Home stadium: Taylor Stadium

1918 Eastern college football independents records
	Conf.			Overall
Team	W	L	T	W		L		T
Bucknell		–		6	–	0	–	0
Princeton		–		3	–	0	–	0
Holy Cross		–		2	–	0	–	0
Army		–		1	–	0	–	0
Buffalo		–		6	–	1	–	0
Columbia		–		5	–	1	–	0
Syracuse		–		5	–	1	–	0
Pittsburgh		–		4	–	1	–	0
Boston College		–		5	–	2	–	0
Rutgers		–		5	–	2	–	0
Franklin & Marshall		–		2	–	1	–	0
Geneva		–		4	–	2	–	0
Swarthmore		–		4	–	2	–	0
Harvard		–		2	–	1	–	0
Fordham		–		4	–	2	–	1
Villanova		–		3	–	2	–	0
Penn		–		5	–	3	–	0
Dartmouth		–		3	–	3	–	0
Lehigh		–		4	–	4	–	0
Washington & Jefferson		–		2	–	2	–	0
New Hampshire		–		2	–	2	–	1
Lafayette		–		3	–	4	–	0
Brown		–		2	–	3	–	0
Tufts		–		2	–	3	–	0
Penn State		–		1	–	2	–	1
Vermont		–		0	–	1	–	1
Drexel		–		0	–	1	–	0
NYU		–		0	–	4	–	0

The 1918 Lehigh Brown and White football team was an American football team that represented Lehigh University as an independent during the 1918 college football season. In its seventh season under head coach Tom Keady, the team compiled a 4–4. Lehigh played home games at Taylor Stadium in Bethlehem, Pennsylvania.

== Schedule ==
Date	Opponent	Site	Result	Source
October 12	League Island Marines	Taylor Stadium; Bethlehem, PA	W 6–0	
October 19	Quantico Marines	Taylor Stadium; Bethlehem, PA	W 6–0	
October 26	at Rutgers	Neilson Field; New Brunswick, NJ	L 0–39	
November 2	League Island Marines	Taylor Stadium; Bethlehem, PA	L 3–14	
November 10	at Muhlenberg	Taylor Stadium; Bethlehem, PA	W 54–0	
November 16	Penn State	Taylor Stadium; Bethlehem, PA	L 6–7	
November 23	at Lafayette	March Field; Easton, PA (rivalry)	W 17–0	
November 28	Army Ambulance Corps	Taylor Stadium; Bethlehem, PA	L 0–12	
