= 1918 New Hampshire football team =

American college football season

1918 New Hampshire football
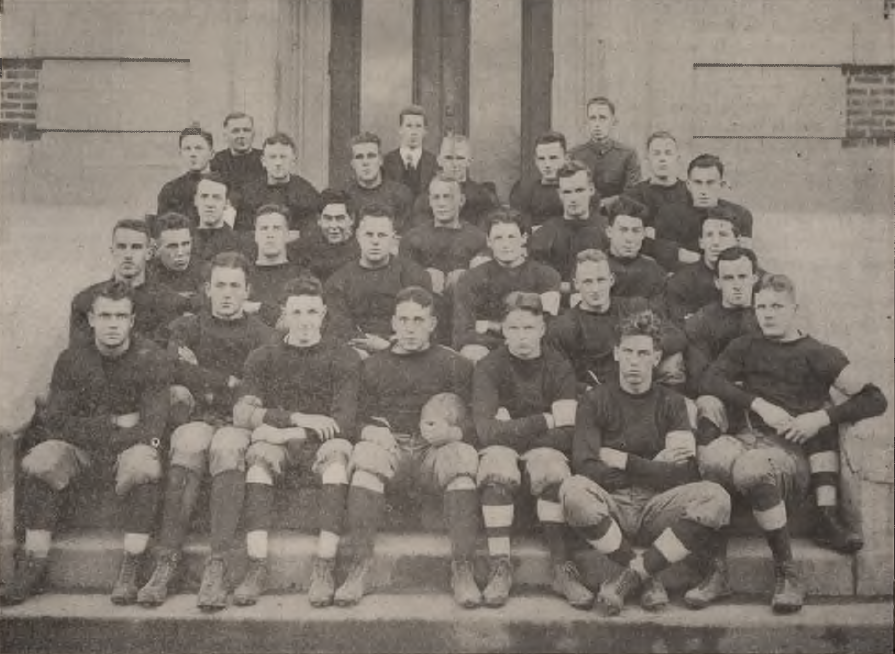
- SATC team, from The New Hampshire student newspaper in November 1918
- Conference: Independent
- Record: varsity: season cancelled SATC: 2–2–1
- Head coach: Edson D. Sanborn (SATC)
- Captain: White (SATC)
- Home stadium: College Oval (Note: College Oval (also known as College Field) was New Hampshire's home field through the 1920 season; Memorial Field, dedicated in 1921, was built in the same location.)

1918 Eastern college football independents records
	Conf.			Overall
Team	W	L	T	W		L		T
Bucknell		–		6	–	0	–	0
Princeton		–		3	–	0	–	0
Holy Cross		–		2	–	0	–	0
Army		–		1	–	0	–	0
Buffalo		–		6	–	1	–	0
Columbia		–		5	–	1	–	0
Syracuse		–		5	–	1	–	0
Pittsburgh		–		4	–	1	–	0
Boston College		–		5	–	2	–	0
Rutgers		–		5	–	2	–	0
Franklin & Marshall		–		2	–	1	–	0
Geneva		–		4	–	2	–	0
Swarthmore		–		4	–	2	–	0
Harvard		–		2	–	1	–	0
Fordham		–		4	–	2	–	1
Villanova		–		3	–	2	–	0
Penn		–		5	–	3	–	0
Dartmouth		–		3	–	3	–	0
Lehigh		–		4	–	4	–	0
Washington & Jefferson		–		2	–	2	–	0
New Hampshire		–		2	–	2	–	1
Lafayette		–		3	–	4	–	0
Brown		–		2	–	3	–	0
Tufts		–		2	–	3	–	0
Penn State		–		1	–	2	–	1
Vermont		–		0	–	1	–	1
Drexel		–		0	–	1	–	0
NYU		–		0	–	4	–	0

The 1918 New Hampshire football team (Note: The school did not adopt the Wildcats nickname until February 1926; before then, they were generally referred to as "the blue and white".) was an American football team slated to represent New Hampshire College of Agriculture and the Mechanic Arts (Note: The school was often referred to as New Hampshire College or New Hampshire State College in newspapers of the era.) during the 1918 college football season—the school became the University of New Hampshire in 1923. However, due to World War I, the varsity season was cancelled. The school did field a team composed of Student Army Training Corps (SATC) personnel, which played a five-game schedule.

== Varsity ==
New Hampshire's varsity team had an eight-game schedule planned, which was released in March 1918. None of the games were played, and by mid-October the season was abandoned, as head coach William "Butch" Cowell was commissioned in the United States Army. (Note: Cowell was discharged from the Army in December 1918.) The team would have been captained by E. Dewey Graham; he later captained the 1919 varsity team.

Varsity schedule (cancelled)
Date	Opponent	Site
October 5	Fort McKinley	Durham, NH
October 12	Bates	Durham, NH
October 19	Rhode Island State	Durham, NH
October 26	Boston University	Durham, NH
November 2	at Dartmouth	Hanover, NH
November 9	Massachusetts	Durham, NH
November 16	at Worcester Tech	Worcester, MA
November 23	(Note: The final game of the varsity schedule was listed as "pending".)	

== SATC ==
By early November, the Student Army Training Corps (SATC) had selected a 35-man roster and was holding practices. The team was coached by Edson D. "Chuck" Sanborn, who had been captain of the 1908 New Hampshire football team. Five games with other teams were organized, most being played after the Armistice with Germany.

Date	Opponent	Site	Result	Attendance	Source
November 9	Bates SATC	Central Park; Dover, NH	W 6–0		
November 16	Fort McKinley	College Oval; Durham, NH	W 15–0	400	
November 23	vs. Maine SATC	Bayside Park; Portland, ME	L 0–20		
November 28	vs. Worcester Tech	Textile Field; Manchester, NH	T 0–0	700	
November 30	vs. MIT	Playstead; Haverhill, MA	L 3–6	300	

These games do not appear in New Hampshire's media guide, as this was not a varsity team.
