= 1918 Lafayette football team =

American football club

1918 Lafayette football
- Conference: Independent
- Record: 3–4
- Head coach: Lewis A. Cobbett (1st season)
- Captain: Grant Scott
- Home stadium: March Field

1918 Eastern college football independents records
	Conf.			Overall
Team	W	L	T	W		L		T
Bucknell		–		6	–	0	–	0
Princeton		–		3	–	0	–	0
Holy Cross		–		2	–	0	–	0
Army		–		1	–	0	–	0
Buffalo		–		6	–	1	–	0
Columbia		–		5	–	1	–	0
Syracuse		–		5	–	1	–	0
Pittsburgh		–		4	–	1	–	0
Boston College		–		5	–	2	–	0
Rutgers		–		5	–	2	–	0
Franklin & Marshall		–		2	–	1	–	0
Geneva		–		4	–	2	–	0
Swarthmore		–		4	–	2	–	0
Harvard		–		2	–	1	–	0
Fordham		–		4	–	2	–	1
Villanova		–		3	–	2	–	0
Penn		–		5	–	3	–	0
Dartmouth		–		3	–	3	–	0
Lehigh		–		4	–	4	–	0
Washington & Jefferson		–		2	–	2	–	0
New Hampshire		–		2	–	2	–	1
Lafayette		–		3	–	4	–	0
Brown		–		2	–	3	–	0
Tufts		–		2	–	3	–	0
Penn State		–		1	–	2	–	1
Vermont		–		0	–	1	–	1
Drexel		–		0	–	1	–	0
NYU		–		0	–	4	–	0

The 1918 Lafayette football team was an American football team that represented Lafayette College as an independent during the 1918 college football season. In its first and only season under head coach Lewis A. Cobbett, the team compiled a 3–4 record. Grant Scott was the team captain. The team played its home games at March Field in Easton, Pennsylvania.

== Schedule ==
Date	Opponent	Site	Result	Source
October 19	Ursinus	March Field; Easton, PA	W 17–0	
October 26	Muhlenberg	March Field; Easton, PA	L 0–7	
November 9	at Penn	Franklin Field; Philadelphia, PA	L 0–34	
November 18	Franklin & Marshall	March Field; Easton, PA	W 13–0	
November 23	Lehigh	March Field; Easton, PA (rivalry)	L 0–17	
November 28	Garden City Aviation	March Field; Easton, PA	L 0–21	
December 2	Saint Joseph's	March Field; Easton, PA	W 18–13	
