= 1918 Swarthmore Quakers football team =

American college football season

1918 Swarthmore Quakers football
- Conference: Independent
- Record: 4–2
- Head coach: Leroy Mercer (2nd season)
- Home stadium: Swarthmore Field

1918 Eastern college football independents records
	Conf.			Overall
Team	W	L	T	W		L		T
Bucknell		–		6	–	0	–	0
Princeton		–		3	–	0	–	0
Holy Cross		–		2	–	0	–	0
Army		–		1	–	0	–	0
Buffalo		–		6	–	1	–	0
Columbia		–		5	–	1	–	0
Syracuse		–		5	–	1	–	0
Pittsburgh		–		4	–	1	–	0
Boston College		–		5	–	2	–	0
Rutgers		–		5	–	2	–	0
Franklin & Marshall		–		2	–	1	–	0
Geneva		–		4	–	2	–	0
Swarthmore		–		4	–	2	–	0
Harvard		–		2	–	1	–	0
Fordham		–		4	–	2	–	1
Villanova		–		3	–	2	–	0
Penn		–		5	–	3	–	0
Dartmouth		–		3	–	3	–	0
Lehigh		–		4	–	4	–	0
Washington & Jefferson		–		2	–	2	–	0
New Hampshire		–		2	–	2	–	1
Lafayette		–		3	–	4	–	0
Brown		–		2	–	3	–	0
Tufts		–		2	–	3	–	0
Penn State		–		1	–	2	–	1
Vermont		–		0	–	1	–	1
Drexel		–		0	–	1	–	0
NYU		–		0	–	4	–	0

The 1918 Swarthmore Quakers football team was an American football team that represented Swarthmore College as an independent in the 1918 college football season. In their second season under head coach Leroy Mercer, the Quakers compiled a 4–2 record and outscored opponents by a total of 116 to 38.

== Schedule ==
Date	Opponent	Site	Result	Source
October 26	Ursinus	Swarthmore Field; Swarthmore, PA	W 51–7	
November 2	at Penn	Franklin Field; Philadelphia, PA	W 20–12	
November 9	League Island Navy Yard	Swarthmore Field; Swarthmore, PA	L 2–6	
November 16	at Delaware	Swarthmore Field; Swarthmore, PA	W 29-0	
November 23	Penn	Franklin Field; Philadelphia, PA	L 7–13	
November 28	at Pennsylvania Military	Chester, PA	W 7–0	
