= 1918 Rutgers Queensmen football team =

American college football season

1918 Rutgers Queensmen football
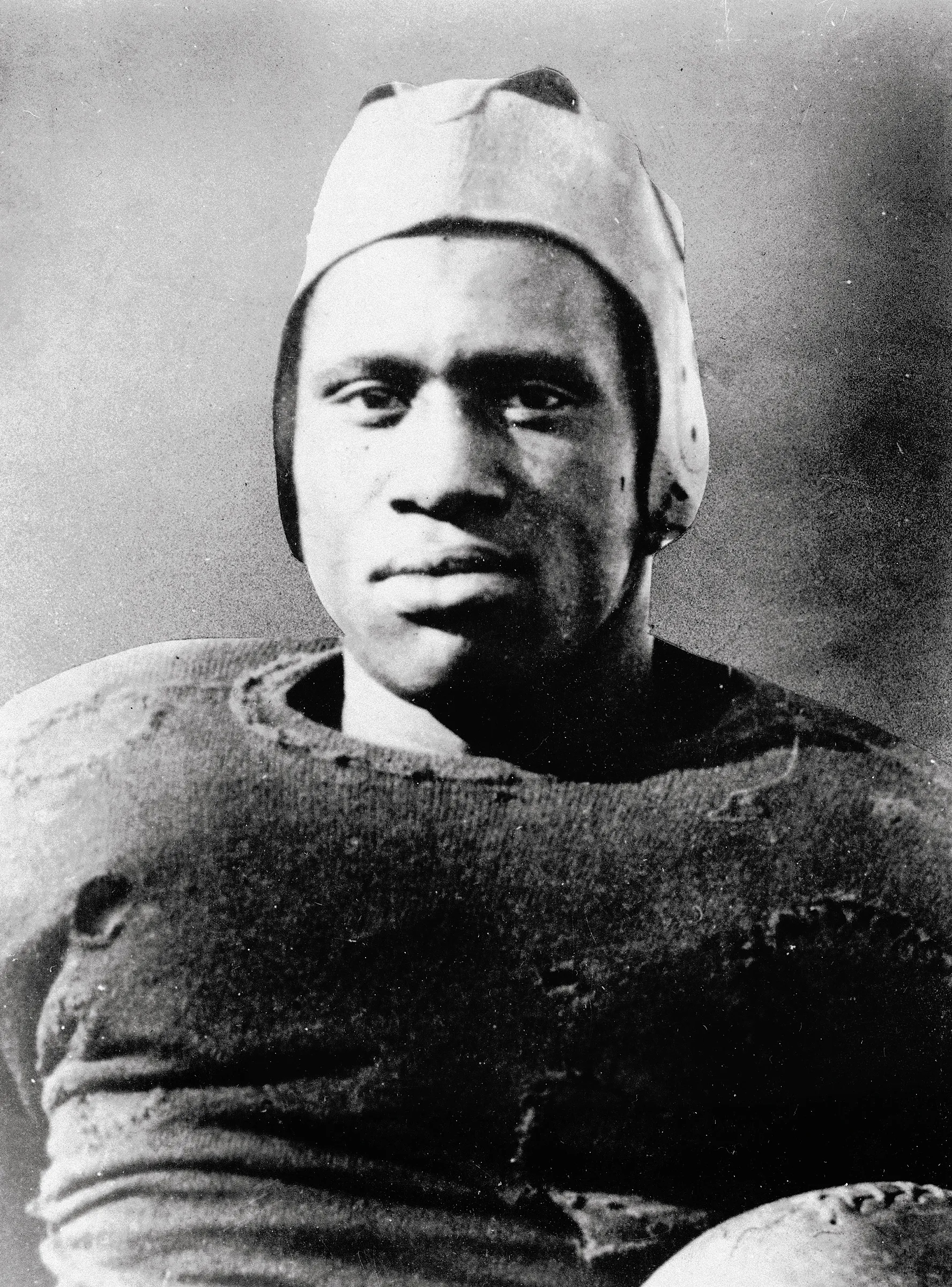
- Rutgers' All-American end Paul Robeson
- Conference: Independent
- Record: 5–2
- Head coach: George Sanford (6th season)
- Home stadium: Neilson Field

1918 Eastern college football independents records
	Conf.			Overall
Team	W	L	T	W		L		T
Bucknell		–		6	–	0	–	0
Princeton		–		3	–	0	–	0
Holy Cross		–		2	–	0	–	0
Army		–		1	–	0	–	0
Buffalo		–		6	–	1	–	0
Columbia		–		5	–	1	–	0
Syracuse		–		5	–	1	–	0
Pittsburgh		–		4	–	1	–	0
Boston College		–		5	–	2	–	0
Rutgers		–		5	–	2	–	0
Franklin & Marshall		–		2	–	1	–	0
Geneva		–		4	–	2	–	0
Swarthmore		–		4	–	2	–	0
Harvard		–		2	–	1	–	0
Fordham		–		4	–	2	–	1
Villanova		–		3	–	2	–	0
Penn		–		5	–	3	–	0
Dartmouth		–		3	–	3	–	0
Lehigh		–		4	–	4	–	0
Washington & Jefferson		–		2	–	2	–	0
New Hampshire		–		2	–	2	–	1
Lafayette		–		3	–	4	–	0
Brown		–		2	–	3	–	0
Tufts		–		2	–	3	–	0
Penn State		–		1	–	2	–	1
Vermont		–		0	–	1	–	1
Drexel		–		0	–	1	–	0
NYU		–		0	–	4	–	0

The 1918 Rutgers Queensmen football team was an American football team that represented Rutgers University as an independent during the 1918 college football season. In their sixth season under head coach George Sanford, the team compiled a 5–2 record, shut out its first four opponents, and outscored all opponents by a total of 192 to 78.

Paul Robeson played at the end position for the 1917 and 1918 Rutgers teams, was selected by Frank G. Menke as a first-team All-American in both 1917 and 1918, and was inducted into the College Football Hall of Fame in 1995. Sanford was inducted into the College Football Hall of Fame in 1971.

== Schedule ==
Date	Opponent	Site	Result	Source
September 28	Ursinus	Neilson Field; New Brunswick, NJ	W 66–0	
October 19	Pelham Bay Naval Station	Neilson Field; New Brunswick, NJ	W 7–0	
October 26	Lehigh	Neilson Field; New Brunswick, NJ	W 39–0	
November 5	Brickley's Naval Transport Service	Neilson Field; New Brunswick, NJ	W 40–0	
November 9	at Penn State	State College, PA	W 26–3	
November 16	vs. Great Lakes Navy	Ebbets Field; Brooklyn, NY	L 14–54	
November 30	vs. Syracuse	Polo Grounds; New York, NY	L 0–21	
