= 1918 Washington State football team =

American college football season

1918 Washington State football
- Conference: Independent
- Record: 1–1
- Head coach: Emory Alvord (1st season)
- Captain: None
- Home stadium: Rogers Field

1918 Western college football independents records
	Conf.			Overall
Team	W	L	T	W		L		T
Hawaii		–		3	–	1	–	0
USC		–		2	–	2	–	2
Washington State		–		1	–	1	–	0
Gonzaga		–		0	–	2	–	1
Saint Mary's		–		0	–	7	–	0

The 1918 Washington State football team was an American football team that represented Washington State College as an independent during the 1918 college football season, after being a member of the Pacific Coast Conference (PCC) in 1917. The team competed under head coach Emory Alvord, compiling a record of 1–1. The team rejoined the PCC in 1919. The 1919 team also notably adopted the "Cougars" nickname.

== Schedule ==
Date	Opponent	Site	Result
November 28	Gonzaga	Rogers Field; Pullman, WA	W 20–6
December 7	at Idaho SATC	MacLean Field; Moscow, ID (rivalry)	L 6–7
