= 1918 USC Trojans football team =

American college football season

1918 USC Trojans football
- Conference: Independent
- Record: 2–2–2
- Head coach: Dean Cromwell (5th season)
- Captains: Harold Galloway; Keith Hunter
- Home stadium: Bovard Field

1918 Western college football independents records
	Conf.			Overall
Team	W	L	T	W		L		T
Hawaii		–		3	–	1	–	0
USC		–		2	–	2	–	2
Washington State		–		1	–	1	–	0
Gonzaga		–		0	–	2	–	1
Saint Mary's		–		0	–	7	–	0

The 1918 USC Trojans football team represented the University of Southern California (USC) in the 1918 college football season. In their fifth and final year under head coach Dean Cromwell, the Trojans compiled a 2–2–2 record, scored 61 points, and allowed 61 points.

== Schedule ==
Date	Opponent	Site	Result	Attendance	Source
November 23	vs. Stanford	Tournament Park; Pasadena, CA (rivalry)	W 25–8		
November 30	at Whittier	Hadley Field; Whittier, CA	T 13–13		
December 7	at Pomona	Pomona, CA	T 0–0		
December 14	California	Bovard Field; Los Angeles, CA	L 7–33	10,000	
December 21	Occidental	Bovard Field; Los Angeles, CA	L 6–7		
December 25	Redlands	Bovard Field; Los Angeles, CA	W 10–0		
