= 1918 Harvard Crimson football team =

American college football season

1918 Harvard Crimson football
- Conference: Independent
- Record: 2–1
- Head coach: Pooch Donovan (1st season)
- Home stadium: Harvard Stadium

1918 Eastern college football independents records
	Conf.			Overall
Team	W	L	T	W		L		T
Bucknell		–		6	–	0	–	0
Princeton		–		3	–	0	–	0
Holy Cross		–		2	–	0	–	0
Army		–		1	–	0	–	0
Buffalo		–		6	–	1	–	0
Columbia		–		5	–	1	–	0
Syracuse		–		5	–	1	–	0
Pittsburgh		–		4	–	1	–	0
Boston College		–		5	–	2	–	0
Rutgers		–		5	–	2	–	0
Franklin & Marshall		–		2	–	1	–	0
Geneva		–		4	–	2	–	0
Swarthmore		–		4	–	2	–	0
Harvard		–		2	–	1	–	0
Fordham		–		4	–	2	–	1
Villanova		–		3	–	2	–	0
Penn		–		5	–	3	–	0
Dartmouth		–		3	–	3	–	0
Lehigh		–		4	–	4	–	0
Washington & Jefferson		–		2	–	2	–	0
New Hampshire		–		2	–	2	–	1
Lafayette		–		3	–	4	–	0
Brown		–		2	–	3	–	0
Tufts		–		2	–	3	–	0
Penn State		–		1	–	2	–	1
Vermont		–		0	–	1	–	1
Drexel		–		0	–	1	–	0
NYU		–		0	–	4	–	0

The 1918 Harvard Crimson football team represented Harvard University as an independent during he 1918 college football season. Led by Pooch Donovan in his first and only season as head coach, Crimson compiled a record of 2–1. Walter Camp did not select any Harvard players as first-team members of his 1918 College Football All-America Team.

== Schedule ==
Date	Opponent	Site	Result
November 9	Tufts	Harvard Stadium; Boston, MA	W 7–0
November 23	Boston College	Harvard Stadium; Boston, MA	W 14–6
November 30	Brown	Harvard Stadium; Boston, MA	L 3–6
