= 1918 Boston College football team =

American college football season

1918 Boston College football
- Conference: Independent
- Record: 5–2
- Head coach: Frank Morrissey (1st season)
- Captain: Frank Morrissey
- Home stadium: Alumni Field, Braves Field

1918 Eastern college football independents records
	Conf.			Overall
Team	W	L	T	W		L		T
Bucknell		–		6	–	0	–	0
Princeton		–		3	–	0	–	0
Holy Cross		–		2	–	0	–	0
Army		–		1	–	0	–	0
Buffalo		–		6	–	1	–	0
Columbia		–		5	–	1	–	0
Syracuse		–		5	–	1	–	0
Pittsburgh		–		4	–	1	–	0
Boston College		–		5	–	2	–	0
Rutgers		–		5	–	2	–	0
Franklin & Marshall		–		2	–	1	–	0
Geneva		–		4	–	2	–	0
Swarthmore		–		4	–	2	–	0
Harvard		–		2	–	1	–	0
Fordham		–		4	–	2	–	1
Villanova		–		3	–	2	–	0
Penn		–		5	–	3	–	0
Dartmouth		–		3	–	3	–	0
Lehigh		–		4	–	4	–	0
Washington & Jefferson		–		2	–	2	–	0
New Hampshire		–		2	–	2	–	1
Lafayette		–		3	–	4	–	0
Brown		–		2	–	3	–	0
Tufts		–		2	–	3	–	0
Penn State		–		1	–	2	–	1
Vermont		–		0	–	1	–	1
Drexel		–		0	–	1	–	0
NYU		–		0	–	4	–	0

The 1918 Boston College football team was an American football team that represented Boston College as an independent during the 1918 college football season. Led by Frank Morrissey in his first and only season as head coach, Boston College compiled a record of 5–2.

== Schedule ==
Date	Time	Opponent	Site	Result	Attendance	Source
October 26		Camp Devens	Braves Field; Boston, MA	W 13–0		
November 2		Norwich	Alumni Field; Chestnut Hill, MA	W 6–0	1,200	
November 9		Camp Bumkin	Alumni Field; Chestnut Hill, MA	W 38–7		
November 16		Fordham	Alumni Field; Chestnut Hill, MA	L 0–14		
November 23		at Harvard	Harvard Stadium; Boston, MA	L 6–14		
November 30	2:00 p.m.	Tufts	Alumni Field; Chestnut Hill, MA	W 54–0		
December 17		Minneola Aviation Station	Braves Field; Boston, MA	W 25–0		
All times are in Eastern time
