= 1918 Hawaii Deans football team =

American college football season

1918 Hawaii Deans football
- Conference: Independent
- Record: 3–1
- Head coach: David L. Crawford (2nd season)

1918 Western college football independents records
	Conf.			Overall
Team	W	L	T	W		L		T
Hawaii		–		3	–	1	–	0
USC		–		2	–	2	–	2
Washington State		–		1	–	1	–	0
Gonzaga		–		0	–	2	–	1
Saint Mary's		–		0	–	7	–	0

The 1918 Hawaii Deans football team represented the College of Hawaiʻi—now known as the University of Hawaiʻi at Mānoa—as an independent during the 1918 college football season. In their second season under head coach David L. Crawford, the Deans compiled a 3–1 record.

== Schedule ==
Date	Opponent	Site	Result
November 9	Aero Squadron		W 21–0
November 16	1st Infantry (Ft. Shafter)		L 7–34
November 23	Aero Squadron		W 27–7
November 28	Signal Corps		W 7–6
