= 1918 Brown Bears football team =

American college football season

1918 Brown Bears football
- Conference: Independent
- Record: 2–3
- Head coach: Edward N. Robinson (17th season)
- Home stadium: Andrews Field

1918 Eastern college football independents records
	Conf.			Overall
Team	W	L	T	W		L		T
Bucknell		–		6	–	0	–	0
Princeton		–		3	–	0	–	0
Holy Cross		–		2	–	0	–	0
Army		–		1	–	0	–	0
Buffalo		–		6	–	1	–	0
Columbia		–		5	–	1	–	0
Syracuse		–		5	–	1	–	0
Pittsburgh		–		4	–	1	–	0
Boston College		–		5	–	2	–	0
Rutgers		–		5	–	2	–	0
Franklin & Marshall		–		2	–	1	–	0
Geneva		–		4	–	2	–	0
Swarthmore		–		4	–	2	–	0
Harvard		–		2	–	1	–	0
Fordham		–		4	–	2	–	1
Villanova		–		3	–	2	–	0
Penn		–		5	–	3	–	0
Dartmouth		–		3	–	3	–	0
Lehigh		–		4	–	4	–	0
Washington & Jefferson		–		2	–	2	–	0
New Hampshire		–		2	–	2	–	1
Lafayette		–		3	–	4	–	0
Brown		–		2	–	3	–	0
Tufts		–		2	–	3	–	0
Penn State		–		1	–	2	–	1
Vermont		–		0	–	1	–	1
Drexel		–		0	–	1	–	0
NYU		–		0	–	4	–	0

The 1918 Brown Bears football team represented Brown University as an independent during the 1918 college football season. Led by 17th-year head coach Edward N. Robinson, Brown compiled a record of 2–3.

== Schedule ==
Date	Opponent	Site	Result	Source
November 2	Camp Devens	Andrews Field; Providence, RI	L 7–20	
November 10	at Syracuse	Archbold Stadium; Syracuse, NY	L 0–53	
November 16	at League Island Marines	Franklin Field; Philadelphia, PA	L 7–23	
November 23	vs. Dartmouth	Braves Field; Boston, MA	W 28–0	
November 28	at Harvard	Harvard Stadium; Boston, MA	W 6–3	
