= 1918 Buffalo Bisons football team =

American college football season

1918 Buffalo Bisons football
- Conference: Independent
- Record: 6–1
- Head coach: Art Powell (3rd season)
- Captain: J. H. "Jake Wolf"
- Home stadium: Buffalo Baseball Park, Lafayette Field

1918 Eastern college football independents records
| | Conf. | | | Overall |
| Team | W | L | T | W | | L | | T |
|---|---|---|---|---|---|---|---|---|
| Bucknell | | – | | 6 | – | 0 | – | 0 |
| Princeton | | – | | 3 | – | 0 | – | 0 |
| Holy Cross | | – | | 2 | – | 0 | – | 0 |
| Army | | – | | 1 | – | 0 | – | 0 |
| Buffalo | | – | | 6 | – | 1 | – | 0 |
| Columbia | | – | | 5 | – | 1 | – | 0 |
| Syracuse | | – | | 5 | – | 1 | – | 0 |
| Pittsburgh | | – | | 4 | – | 1 | – | 0 |
| Boston College | | – | | 5 | – | 2 | – | 0 |
| Rutgers | | – | | 5 | – | 2 | – | 0 |
| Franklin & Marshall | | – | | 2 | – | 1 | – | 0 |
| Geneva | | – | | 4 | – | 2 | – | 0 |
| Swarthmore | | – | | 4 | – | 2 | – | 0 |
| Harvard | | – | | 2 | – | 1 | – | 0 |
| Fordham | | – | | 4 | – | 2 | – | 1 |
| Villanova | | – | | 3 | – | 2 | – | 0 |
| Penn | | – | | 5 | – | 3 | – | 0 |
| Dartmouth | | – | | 3 | – | 3 | – | 0 |
| Lehigh | | – | | 4 | – | 4 | – | 0 |
| Washington & Jefferson | | – | | 2 | – | 2 | – | 0 |
| New Hampshire | | – | | 2 | – | 2 | – | 1 |
| Lafayette | | – | | 3 | – | 4 | – | 0 |
| Brown | | – | | 2 | – | 3 | – | 0 |
| Tufts | | – | | 2 | – | 3 | – | 0 |
| Penn State | | – | | 1 | – | 2 | – | 1 |
| Vermont | | – | | 0 | – | 1 | – | 1 |
| Drexel | | – | | 0 | – | 1 | – | 0 |
| NYU | | – | | 0 | – | 4 | – | 0 |

The 1918 Buffalo Bisons football team was an American football team that represented the University at Buffalo as an independent during the 1918 college football season. In its third season under head coach Art Powell, the team compiled a 6–1 record, shut out four of seven opponents, and outscored all opponents by a total of 234 to 40.

== Schedule ==
| Date | Opponent | Site | Result | Attendance | Source |
|---|---|---|---|---|---|
| October 12 | Curtiss Aeroplane and Motor Company | Buffalo Baseball Park; Buffalo, NY | W 6–0 | | |
| October 19 | Naval Artificers | Buffalo Baseball Park; Buffalo, NY | W 40–0 | | |
| November 2 | Niagara | Buffalo Baseball Park; Buffalo, NY | W 41–0 | | |
| November 9 | Rochester | Buffalo Baseball Park; Buffalo, NY | W 19–6 | | |
| November 16 | Hobart | Lafayette Field; Buffalo, NY | W 81–0 | 1,500 | |
| November 23 | Naval Artificers | Buffalo Baseball Park; Buffalo, NY | W 47–6 | | |
| November 28 | at Cornell SATC | Schoellkopf Field; Ithaca, NY | L 0–28 | | |
