= 1918 Syracuse Orangemen football team =

American college football season

1918 Syracuse Orangemen football
- Conference: Independent
- Record: 5–1
- Head coach: Frank "Buck" O'Neill (7th season)
- Captains: Doc Alexander; Joe Schwarzer
- Home stadium: Archbold Stadium

1918 Eastern college football independents records
	Conf.			Overall
Team	W	L	T	W		L		T
Bucknell		–		6	–	0	–	0
Princeton		–		3	–	0	–	0
Holy Cross		–		2	–	0	–	0
Army		–		1	–	0	–	0
Buffalo		–		6	–	1	–	0
Columbia		–		5	–	1	–	0
Syracuse		–		5	–	1	–	0
Pittsburgh		–		4	–	1	–	0
Boston College		–		5	–	2	–	0
Rutgers		–		5	–	2	–	0
Franklin & Marshall		–		2	–	1	–	0
Geneva		–		4	–	2	–	0
Swarthmore		–		4	–	2	–	0
Harvard		–		2	–	1	–	0
Fordham		–		4	–	2	–	1
Villanova		–		3	–	2	–	0
Penn		–		5	–	3	–	0
Dartmouth		–		3	–	3	–	0
Lehigh		–		4	–	4	–	0
Washington & Jefferson		–		2	–	2	–	0
New Hampshire		–		2	–	2	–	1
Lafayette		–		3	–	4	–	0
Brown		–		2	–	3	–	0
Tufts		–		2	–	3	–	0
Penn State		–		1	–	2	–	1
Vermont		–		0	–	1	–	1
Drexel		–		0	–	1	–	0
NYU		–		0	–	4	–	0

The 1918 Syracuse Orangemen football team represented Syracuse University as an independent during the 1918 college football season.

== Schedule ==
Date	Opponent	Site	Result	Attendance	Source
October 26	Navy Transport	Archbold Stadium; Syracuse, NY	W 13–0	6,000	
November 2	vs. Dartmouth	Pratt Field; Springfield, MA	W 34–6		
November 10	Brown	Archbold Stadium; Syracuse, NY	W 53–0	5,000	
November 16	at Michigan	Ferry Field; Ann Arbor, MI	L 0–15		
November 28	Columbia	Archbold Stadium; Syracuse, NY	W 20–0	1,000	
November 30	vs. Rutgers	Polo Grounds; New York, NY	W 21–0		
