= 1918 Geneva Covenanters football team =

American college football season

1918 Geneva Covenanters football
- Conference: Independent
- Record: 4–2
- Head coach: Philip Henry Bridenbaugh (2nd season)
- Captains: Samuel A. Steele; Stewart
- Home stadium: Geneva Field

1918 Eastern college football independents records
	Conf.			Overall
Team	W	L	T	W		L		T
Bucknell		–		6	–	0	–	0
Princeton		–		3	–	0	–	0
Holy Cross		–		2	–	0	–	0
Army		–		1	–	0	–	0
Buffalo		–		6	–	1	–	0
Columbia		–		5	–	1	–	0
Syracuse		–		5	–	1	–	0
Pittsburgh		–		4	–	1	–	0
Boston College		–		5	–	2	–	0
Rutgers		–		5	–	2	–	0
Franklin & Marshall		–		2	–	1	–	0
Geneva		–		4	–	2	–	0
Swarthmore		–		4	–	2	–	0
Harvard		–		2	–	1	–	0
Fordham		–		4	–	2	–	1
Villanova		–		3	–	2	–	0
Penn		–		5	–	3	–	0
Dartmouth		–		3	–	3	–	0
Lehigh		–		4	–	4	–	0
Washington & Jefferson		–		2	–	2	–	0
New Hampshire		–		2	–	2	–	1
Lafayette		–		3	–	4	–	0
Brown		–		2	–	3	–	0
Tufts		–		2	–	3	–	0
Penn State		–		1	–	2	–	1
Vermont		–		0	–	1	–	1
Drexel		–		0	–	1	–	0
NYU		–		0	–	4	–	0

The 1918 Geneva Covenanters football team was an American football team that represented Geneva College as an independent during the 1918 college football season. Led by second-year head coach Philip Henry Bridenbaugh, the team compiled a record of 4–2, outscoring its opponents 63 to 36. Samuel A. Steele, who played at guard, was the team's captain at the outset of the season, but he died of pneumonia induced by the Spanish flu in October, after the team's opening game against The Kiski School. Stewart, who played at center, served as captain when the team resumed play in November.

== Schedule ==
Date	Opponent	Site	Result	Source
October 5	The Kiski School	Beaver Falls, PA	L 0–7	
November 2	Westminster (PA)	Beaver Falls, PA	W 21–0	
November 16	Washington & Jefferson	Beaver Falls, PA	W 3–0	
November 23	Allegheny	Beaver Falls, PA	W 10–9	
November 30	Hiram	Beaver Falls, PA	W 27–0	
December 7	Wissahickon Barracks	Geneva Field; Beaver Falls, PA	L 6–20	
