= 1918 Penn State Nittany Lions football team =

American college football season

1918 Penn State Nittany Lions football
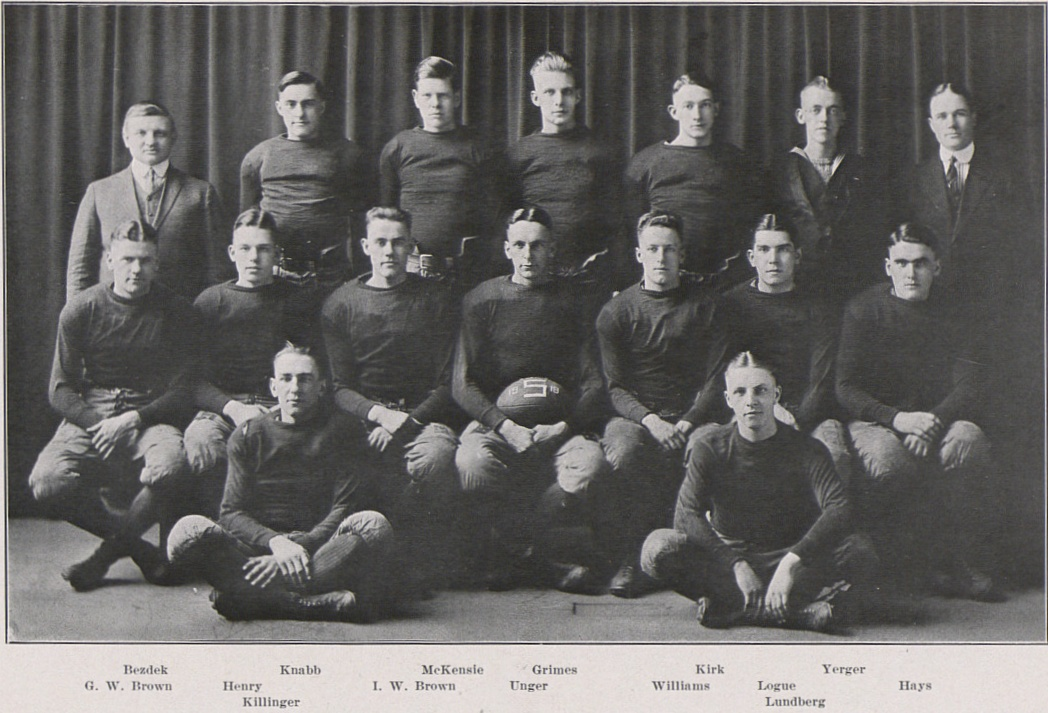
- Conference: Independent
- Record: 1–2–1
- Head coach: Hugo Bezdek (1st season)
- Captains: Harry Robb; Frank Unger
- Home stadium: New Beaver Field

1918 Eastern college football independents records
	Conf.			Overall
Team	W	L	T	W		L		T
Bucknell		–		6	–	0	–	0
Princeton		–		3	–	0	–	0
Holy Cross		–		2	–	0	–	0
Army		–		1	–	0	–	0
Buffalo		–		6	–	1	–	0
Columbia		–		5	–	1	–	0
Syracuse		–		5	–	1	–	0
Pittsburgh		–		4	–	1	–	0
Boston College		–		5	–	2	–	0
Rutgers		–		5	–	2	–	0
Franklin & Marshall		–		2	–	1	–	0
Geneva		–		4	–	2	–	0
Swarthmore		–		4	–	2	–	0
Harvard		–		2	–	1	–	0
Fordham		–		4	–	2	–	1
Villanova		–		3	–	2	–	0
Penn		–		5	–	3	–	0
Dartmouth		–		3	–	3	–	0
Lehigh		–		4	–	4	–	0
Washington & Jefferson		–		2	–	2	–	0
New Hampshire		–		2	–	2	–	1
Lafayette		–		3	–	4	–	0
Brown		–		2	–	3	–	0
Tufts		–		2	–	3	–	0
Penn State		–		1	–	2	–	1
Vermont		–		0	–	1	–	1
Drexel		–		0	–	1	–	0
NYU		–		0	–	4	–	0

The 1918 Penn State Nittany Lions football team represented the Pennsylvania State University as an independent during the 1918 college football season. The team was coached by Hugo Bezdek and played its home games in New Beaver Field in State College, Pennsylvania.

== Schedule ==
Date	Opponent	Site	Result	Attendance	Source
November 2	Wissahickon Barracks	New Beaver Field; State College, PA	T 6–6		
November 9	Rutgers	New Beaver Field; State College, PA	L 3–26		
November 16	at Lehigh	Taylor Stadium; Bethlehem, PA	W 7–6		
November 28	at Pittsburgh	Forbes Field; Pittsburgh, PA (rivalry)	L 6–28	6,000	
