= 1918 Washington & Jefferson Red and Black football team =

American college football season

1918 Washington & Jefferson Red and Black football
- Conference: Independent
- Record: 2–2
- Head coach: Ralph Hutchinson (1st season)

1918 Eastern college football independents records
	Conf.			Overall
Team	W	L	T	W		L		T
Bucknell		–		6	–	0	–	0
Princeton		–		3	–	0	–	0
Holy Cross		–		2	–	0	–	0
Army		–		1	–	0	–	0
Buffalo		–		6	–	1	–	0
Columbia		–		5	–	1	–	0
Syracuse		–		5	–	1	–	0
Pittsburgh		–		4	–	1	–	0
Boston College		–		5	–	2	–	0
Rutgers		–		5	–	2	–	0
Franklin & Marshall		–		2	–	1	–	0
Geneva		–		4	–	2	–	0
Swarthmore		–		4	–	2	–	0
Harvard		–		2	–	1	–	0
Fordham		–		4	–	2	–	1
Villanova		–		3	–	2	–	0
Penn		–		5	–	3	–	0
Dartmouth		–		3	–	3	–	0
Lehigh		–		4	–	4	–	0
Washington & Jefferson		–		2	–	2	–	0
New Hampshire		–		2	–	2	–	1
Lafayette		–		3	–	4	–	0
Brown		–		2	–	3	–	0
Tufts		–		2	–	3	–	0
Penn State		–		1	–	2	–	1
Vermont		–		0	–	1	–	1
Drexel		–		0	–	1	–	0
NYU		–		0	–	4	–	0

The 1918 Washington & Jefferson Red and Black football team represented Washington & Jefferson College as an independent during the 1918 college football season. Led by Ralph Hutchinson in his first and only year as head coach, Washington & Jefferson compiled a record of 2–2.

== Schedule ==
Date	Time	Opponent	Site	Result	Attendance	Source
October 5	4:00 p.m.	Indiana Normal (PA)	Washington, PA	W 7–0		
October 19	3:30 p.m.	Camp Sherman	Washington, PA	W 68–0		
November 9	2:30 p.m.	at Pittsburgh	Forbes Field; Pittsburgh, PA	L 0–34	16,000–18,000	
November 16		at Geneva	Beaver Falls, PA	L 0–3		
All times are in Eastern time
