= 1918 Army Cadets football team =

American college football season

1918 Army Cadets football
- Conference: Independent
- Record: 1–0
- Head coach: Hugh Mitchell (1st season)
- Captain: Eugene Luther Vidal
- Home stadium: The Plain

1918 Eastern college football independents records
	Conf.			Overall
Team	W	L	T	W		L		T
Bucknell		–		6	–	0	–	0
Princeton		–		3	–	0	–	0
Holy Cross		–		2	–	0	–	0
Army		–		1	–	0	–	0
Buffalo		–		6	–	1	–	0
Columbia		–		5	–	1	–	0
Syracuse		–		5	–	1	–	0
Pittsburgh		–		4	–	1	–	0
Boston College		–		5	–	2	–	0
Rutgers		–		5	–	2	–	0
Franklin & Marshall		–		2	–	1	–	0
Geneva		–		4	–	2	–	0
Swarthmore		–		4	–	2	–	0
Harvard		–		2	–	1	–	0
Fordham		–		4	–	2	–	1
Villanova		–		3	–	2	–	0
Penn		–		5	–	3	–	0
Dartmouth		–		3	–	3	–	0
Lehigh		–		4	–	4	–	0
Washington & Jefferson		–		2	–	2	–	0
New Hampshire		–		2	–	2	–	1
Lafayette		–		3	–	4	–	0
Brown		–		2	–	3	–	0
Tufts		–		2	–	3	–	0
Penn State		–		1	–	2	–	1
Vermont		–		0	–	1	–	1
Drexel		–		0	–	1	–	0
NYU		–		0	–	4	–	0

The 1918 Army Cadets football team was an American football team that represented the United States Military Academy as an independent during the 1918 college football season. In their only season under head coach Hugh Mitchell, the Cadets played just one game, on campus at West Point. Eugene Luther Vidal, played fullback and was the team captain.

On September 28, Army played its only game of the season, defeating the airmen of Mitchel Field by a score of 20 to 0.

The season was shortened by World War I. In a first step, the War Department issued an order prohibiting overnight trips prior to November 1; the edict forced the cancellation of road games against Boston College and Syracuse. A second order issued on October 4 directed that all upper classmen would be graduated on November 1, leaving the academy with only the members of the plebe class that arrived during the summer. The move left the academy unable to field "a representative Army eleven," and the scheduled game on October 5 with Boston College was cancelled.

== Schedule ==
Date	Opponent	Site	Result
September 28	Mitchel Field	The Plain; West Point, NY	W 20–0

== Roster ==
- Earl Blaik
