= Hugh Mitchell (American football) =

American football player and coach (1890–1967)

Biographical details
- Born: August 5, 1890; Ohio, U.S.
- Died: September 10, 1967 (aged 77); Fort Gordon, Georgia, U.S.

Playing career
- 1914–1916: Army

Coaching career (HC unless noted)
- 1918: Army

Head coaching record
- Overall: 1–0

Hugh Mitchell (August 5, 1890 – September 10, 1967) was an American college football player and coach. He served as the head football coach at the United States Military Academy in 1918, compiling a record of 1–0.

== Head coaching record ==
Year	Team	Overall	Conference	Standing	Bowl/playoffs
Army Cadets (Independent) (1918)
1918	Army	1–0			
Army:		1–0			
Total:		1–0			
