= Domboshava =

Residential area in Mashonaland East, Zimbabwe

Coordinates: 17°36′S 31°08′E

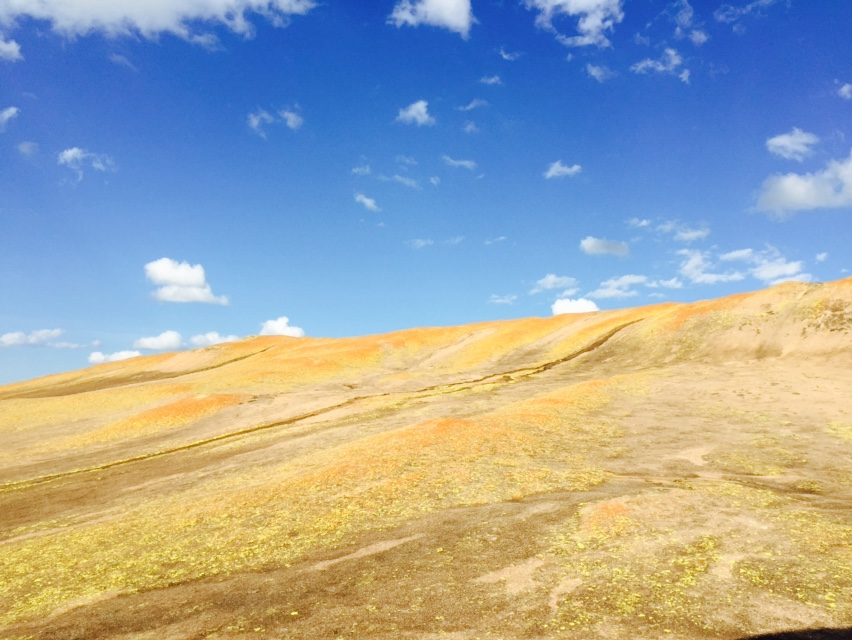
Domboshava rock

Domboshava (also Domboshawa) is a peri-urban residential area in the province of Mashonaland East, Zimbabwe. It is located in an area of granite hills about 27 km (17 mi) north of Harare and is named after the large granite hills. The name is derived from Dombo meaning rock and Shava translating to light brown. The clan name Shava is a reference to the light brown colour of the Eland or Mhofu in Shona.

The most prominent and famous granite hill in Domboshava is called Ngoma Kurira which directly translates to the drum sounds/drumming. This site attracts hundreds of both local and international travellers each year. The granite hill is a National Monument of Zimbabwe and has some examples of cave paintings which date back almost 6000 years. The majority of these paintings can be found in a cave which is some walk from the rock formations at the top of the hill.

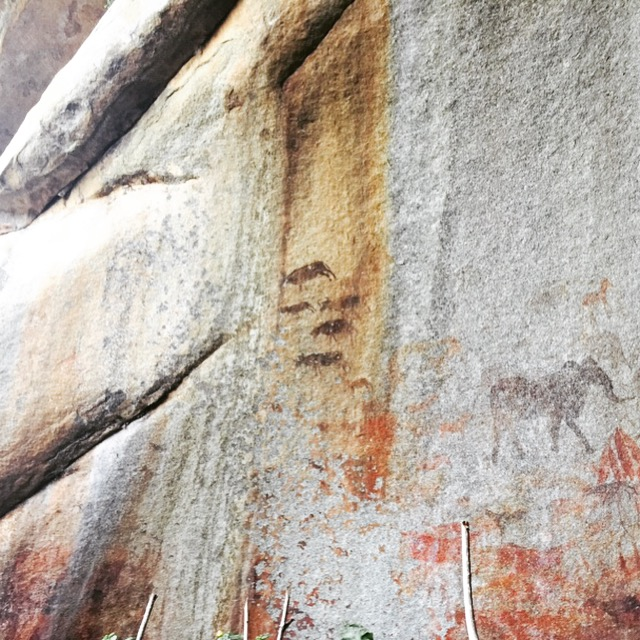
Cave paintings at Domboshava

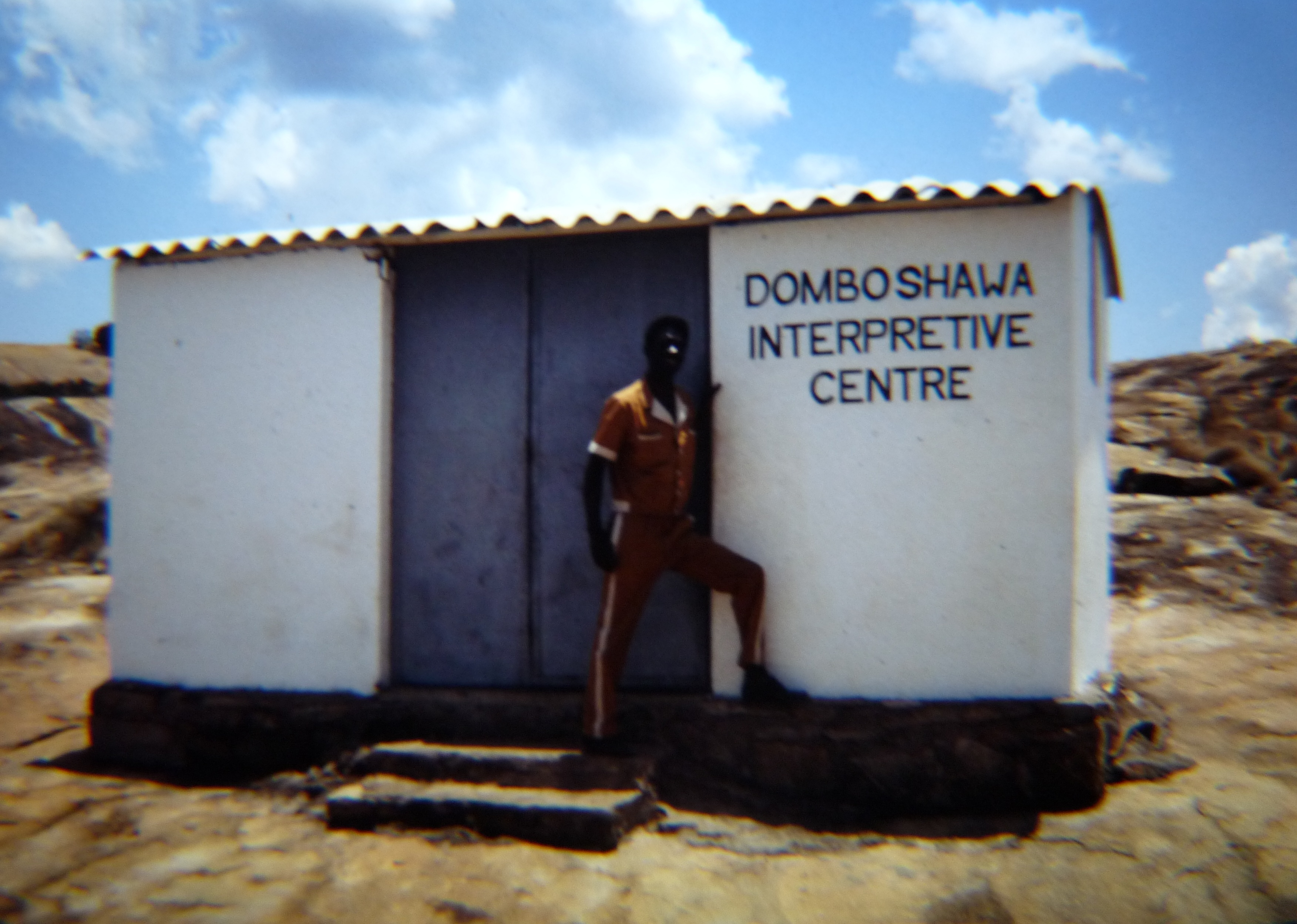
Domboshawa Interpretive Centre

The three largest shopping centres (commonly known as grocery points in Zimbabwe) are Mverechena, Mungate and Showground. These centres have become areas of large economic activity and growth for Domboshava. For many years, primarily in the later 20th-century, Domboshawa was a major location of market gardening for the markets of Harare. Since the start of the 21st-century Domboshava's economy has seen a rise in pottery production and horticulture.
