= Frank Murrey =

American football player and track athlete

Profile
- Position: Quarterback

Personal information
- Born: July 27, 1900; Nashville, Tennessee, U.S.
- Died: February 14, 1977 (aged 76); Franklin, Tennessee, U.S.

Career information
- College: Princeton (1918–1920)

Awards and highlights
- Consensus All-American (1918); Princeton's All-Century Team 1900-99

Frank Lester Murrey (July 27, 1900 – February 14, 1977) was an American college football player, track athlete, and banker. He played football at Princeton University from 1918 to 1920 and was selected by Walter Camp as the first-team quarterback on the 1918 All-America college football team.

== Early life ==
Murrey was born in Nashville, Tennessee. He attended the Tabox School and at The Webb School in Bell Buckle, Tennessee. He played sandlot football in Nashville and at The Webb School.

== Princeton ==
Murrey played quarterback for Princeton University from 1918 to 1921. As a freshman, he was selected by both Walter Camp and the Frank Menke Syndicate as a first-team player on the 1918 All-America college football team. Murrey was a prominent athlete and won the British AAA Championships title in the javelin event at the 1920 AAA Championships.

Also in 1920, Murrey ran 77 yards for a touchdown in Princeton's 14–0 victory over Navy. The New York Times described the run as a "nerve-tingling moment" and a "dazzling serpentine gallop." He was also rated as "one of the all-time great dropkickers." He reportedly once converted 50 consecutive field goals from a distance of 40 yards. In 2000, Murrey was named as one of the backs on Princeton's All-Century Team 1900–99.

In 1921, he won the Elks Grand Prix, a 600-meter special invitation race featuring the nine top college stars.

== Later life ==
Murphy served in the military during World War I. He also worked for a banking house in New York and then returned to Tennessee where he worked for Rogers Caldwell Co. He later worked for an investment banking firm in Chicago and then returned to Tennessee where he worked as president of Franklin Industrial Corp., founded the Dixie Poultry Processing Company, and finally worked as a public relations director for Harpeth National Bank until retiring in 1972. He died on February 14, 1977, after a lengthy illness at age 76, at Williamson County Memorial Hospital in Franklin, Tennessee.

Murrey was married to Mary Farr Denton. They had two children, Lale and Betty.
