= Camp Merritt, New Jersey =

Military base in New Jersey, United States

Coordinates: 40.9413°N 73.9768°W

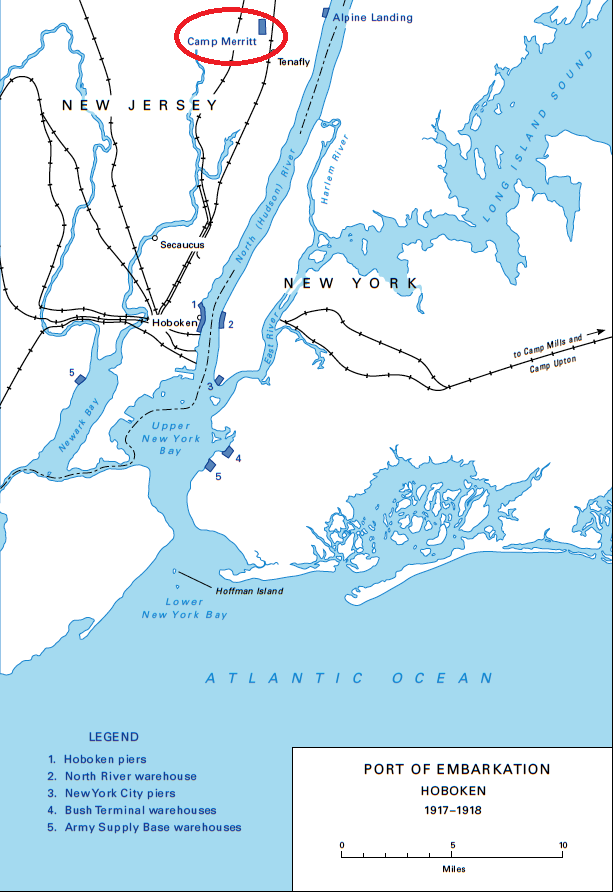
Camp Merritt's location within Port of Embarkation Hoboken (1917–1918)

Camp Merritt was a military base in Dumont and Cresskill, in Bergen County, New Jersey, United States, that was activated for use in World War I. It had a capacity for 38,000 transient troops and was one of three camps directly under the control of the New York Port of Embarkation. Two routes were used to transport troops, the first being local railroads which would carry the men South. The alternate route involved marching in contingents of two to three thousand men to the North-East and descending the Palisades. These men marched for an hour to board ferryboats at Old Closter Dock, Alpine Landing that took them to the piers at Hoboken, New Jersey, to board troop transports for Europe. Contingents would leave the camp for the landing at half hour intervals to board the ferries for the two hour trip to the embarkation piers where several transports might be loading simultaneously. There they would be joined by troops from Camp Mills and Camp Upton arriving by train at a terminal on Long Island for final transport by ferry to the embarkation piers. Approximately four million troops were sent to the Western Front during World War I, and about one million of them passed through Camp Merritt. Camp Merritt was decommissioned in 1919.

== Origin of the camp ==
=== From Camp Tenafly to Camp Merritt ===
Camp Merritt was originally named Camp Tenafly. The camp was first named Camp Tenafly because all previous communication and negotiations concerning the building of the military post were completed in the town of Tenafly, New Jersey. The camp was later named in honor of Major General Wesley Merritt. General Merritt from New York State dedicated most of his life to the armed services. General Merritt served the United States throughout the Civil War, Indian campaigns, and the Spanish War. He participated in several major battles, including the Battle of Gettysburg, the Battle of Yellow Tavern, the Battle of Hall's Shop, the Battle of Winchester, and the Five Fork's. At the age of 27 he was made a full Major General of volunteers, after making his way through the ranks and receiving high positions including Superintendent of the Military Academy at West Point, Governor General of the Philippines, and other prestigious positions. Wesley retired from his long reign in the military in 1900. Ten years later General Merritt died and was buried at West Point with full military honors.

=== Selection of the site ===
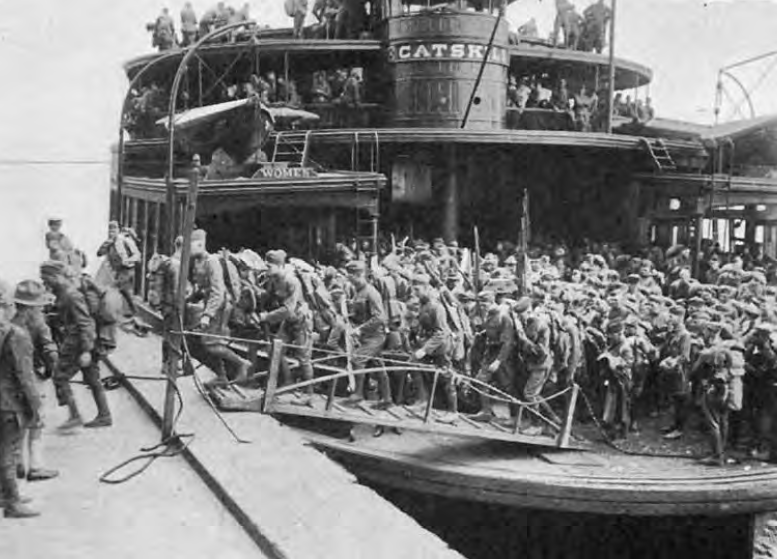
Troops disembarking at Hoboken piers

The United States army needed a location to assemble and for the deployment of troops to the Western Front during World War I. In 1917, Brigadier-General William Wright, Commanding General of the New York Port of Embarkation, chose the location in Bergen County on Knickerbocker road and Grant Avenue. Camp Merritt was strategically situated approximately ten miles from New York City. The camp was located between Cresskill and Dumont, New Jersey. The camp was conveniently located between the Erie Railroad in Cresskill and the West Shore Railroad in Dumont. Some of the resourceful aspects of the area include the easy method of the sewerage, water supply, lighting, and railroad connections. The owners of the property on the site agreed to lease their property to the government on terms which the government deemed reasonable. The location of Camp Merritt was ideal because of the easy access to Hoboken from where the soldiers would be embarking on the transports. Troops were transported to Hoboken by ferryboat from Alpine Landing, over an hour's march from the camp, where contingents of 2,000–3,000 men would assemble to board the ferry to the embarkation piers from which they would board the transports for Europe.

=== Construction of the camp ===
Construction of Camp Merritt began on August 20, 1917. The original plans called for seven regiments of infantry, six warehouses, miscellaneous buildings, and a post hospital with a capacity of five hundred beds. The plans were authorized four months later on December 20, 1917. The selected contractors for the job were MacArthur Brothers Company of engineers and contractors of New York. There were many local carpenters, electricians, and tradesmen who were hired to work on the camp as well. The camp cost about $11 million to build. Camp Merritt was 770 acres in size, and had a capacity of 42,000 men. There were approximately 1,300 buildings on the site.

== Buildings in the camp ==
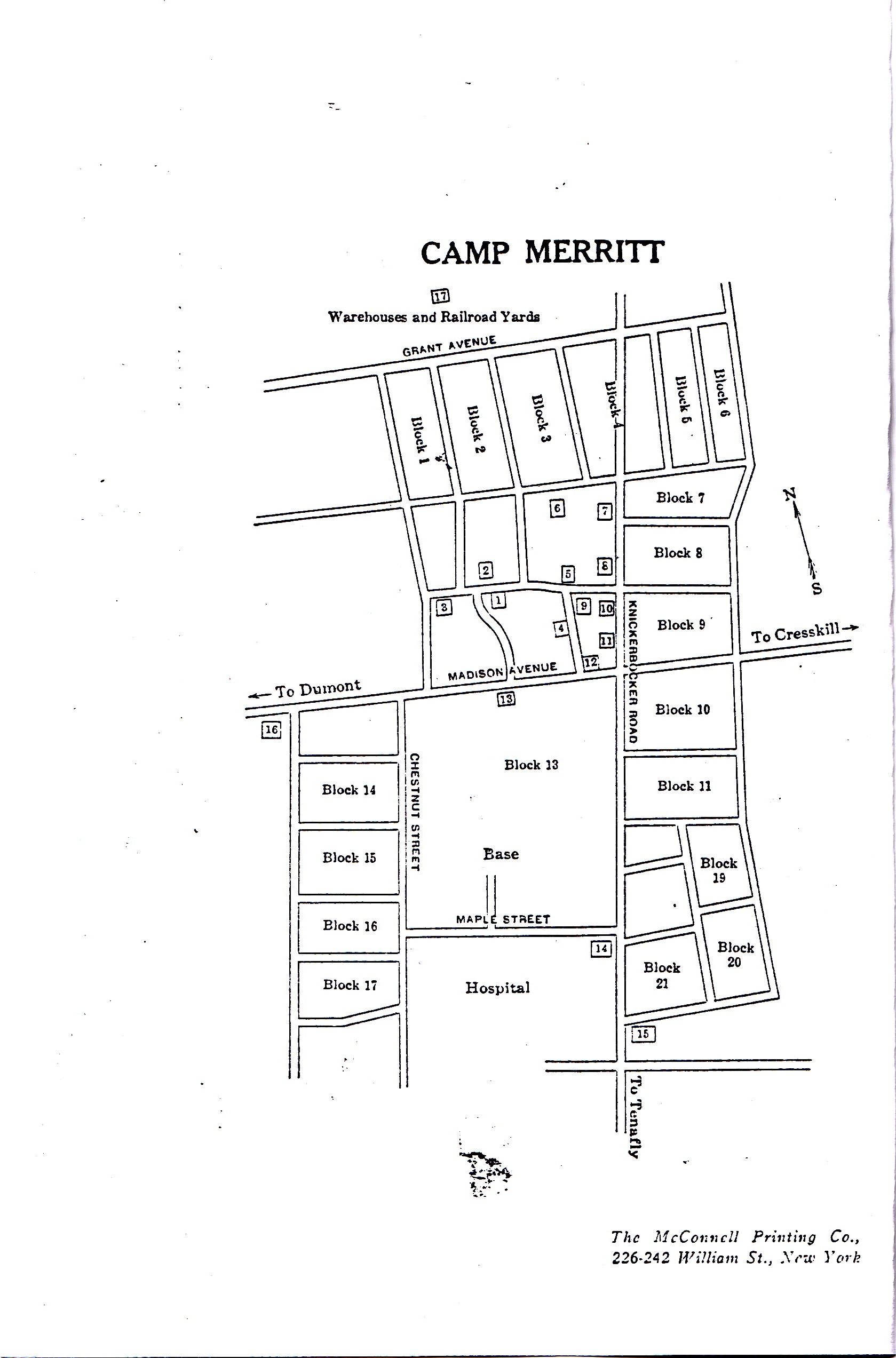
Map of Camp Merritt

On the 770 acres camp there were a total of 1,302 buildings. The soldier's barracks totaled 611 two-story buildings in which 60 men could reside in. Camp Merritt had 165 mess halls, 40 military officer’ quarters, 27 administration buildings, 4 fire stations, 93 hospital buildings, and many more. Also on the camp were four YMCA buildings and American Red Cross buildings. In the spring of 1918 the Liberty Theatre opened on the camp for the entertainment of the soldiers while staying at Merritt. In addition, Merritt Hall the large soldier's club on the camp opened on January 30, 1918. Major General David C. Shanks called Merritt Hall “the finest soldiers club in America.”

=== The post hospital ===
On January 9, 1918, the post hospital was opened. The post hospital had a staff of about 300 nurses who treated over 55,000 soldiers. The nurses and doctors treated various cases including anthrax, pneumonia, measles, scarlet fever, mumps, and particularly the influenza virus. In the fall of 1918 the influenza epidemic reached Camp Merritt and caused devastation.

==== The 1918 influenza pandemic ====
The first person in New Jersey to be diagnosed with influenza was a soldier at Fort Dix. From Fort Dix, the disease spread across the state. By the end of the 1919 wave of influenza approximately 675,000 Americans were dead due to the disease. The influenza pandemic at Camp Merritt began in September 1918. On September 19 fifty-eight soldiers were admitted to the post hospital due to influenza. Three weeks later, there were approximately 1,000 cases of influenza at Camp Merritt. In addition, there were already 265 deaths. Owing to the increasing number of cases some soldiers were sent to local hospitals. Many soldiers became sick during the time they left camp as they prepared to go to Europe.

== Units ==
- Hoboken Casual Company (often shortened to Hob Cas Co). A series of numbered casual companies formed at Camp Merritt.

== The closing of the camp ==
Camp Merritt officially closed in January 1920. The last troops to arrive to Camp Merritt from overseas while it was still active were on January 26, 1920. Following, the decision to close the camp the U.S. military ordered the camp to be dismantled. The remainder of troops was then sent to Fort Dix. The bidding process of Camp Merritt was opened at Washington, D.C., on December 22, 1919. There were many bids from various companies and corporations. The entire camp was eventually sold to the Harris Brothers Company of Chicago for $552, 524.

=== Fire in the camp ===
After Camp Merritt was dismantled for almost a year the camp underwent a series of three devastating fires. The reason for the three fires are still undetermined although there were various rumors and speculations to how they were started. The fire started in Block 17 and destroyed over 150 buildings in that particular area. Over eighteen fire companies attended to the fire including three from New York City. There were two reports of dynamite explosion because there was some stored for use in the wrecking of the camp. There were no reported injuries due to the fire, but what was left of the Camp was destroyed.

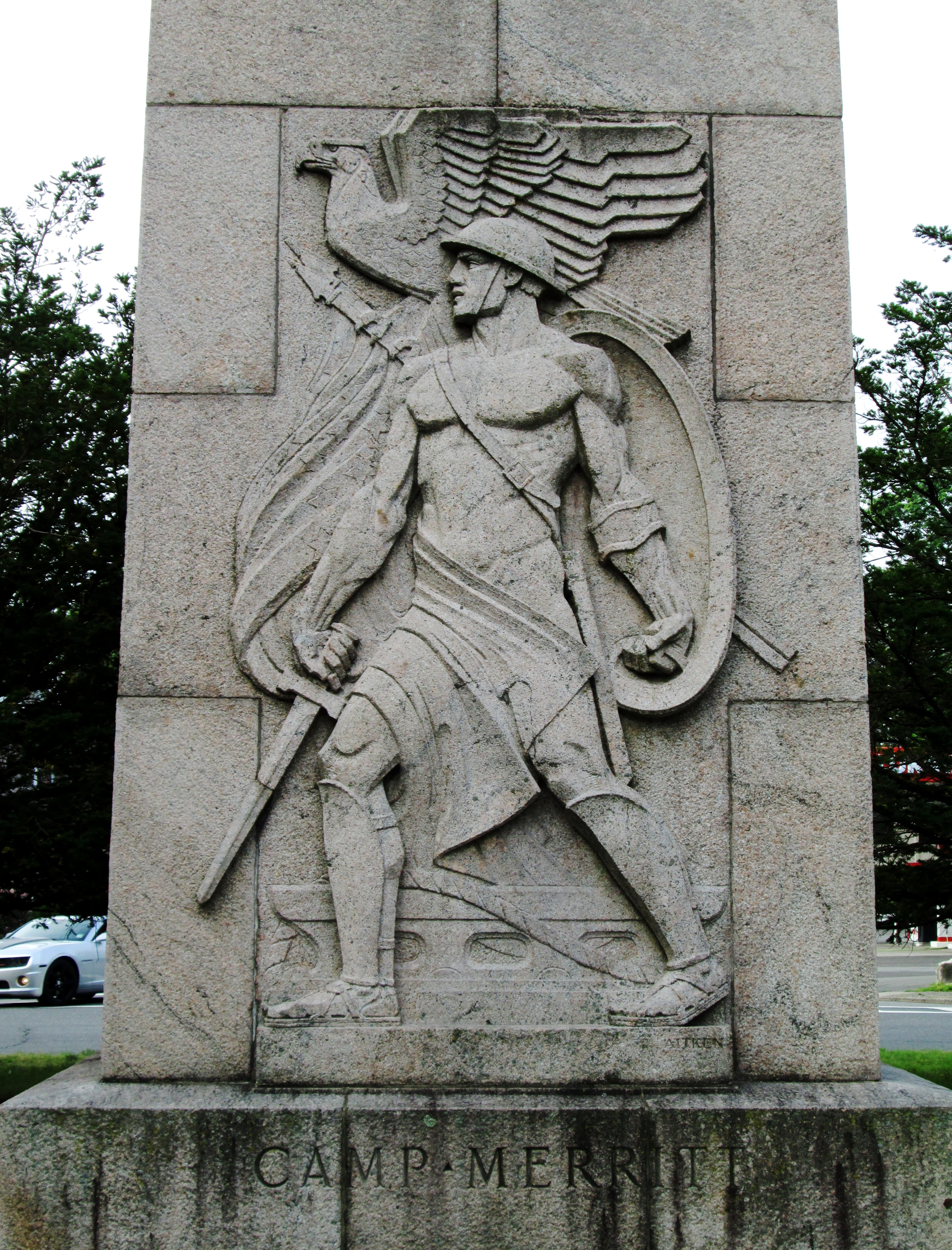
Robert Ingersoll Aitken's relief at the base of the monument

== Camp Merritt Memorial Monument ==
To honor those who passed through Camp Merritt, a monument was erected at the intersection of Madison Avenue and Knickerbocker Road at the border of Cresskill and Dumont. The 66.6-foot (20.3 m) tall granite obelisk, modeled after the Washington Monument is inscribed with the names of the 578 people who died at the camp during the war due to the worldwide influenza epidemic of 1918. Robert Ingersoll Aitken sculpted the relief sculpture of a helmeted soldier on the one side of the base of the monument. The monument was dedicated on Memorial Day, May 30, 1924, with General John J. Pershing giving the dedication address to a crowd estimated at 20,000 people.

== See also ==
- Camp Shanks
- Camp Merritt, California
