= 1918 college football season =

American college football season

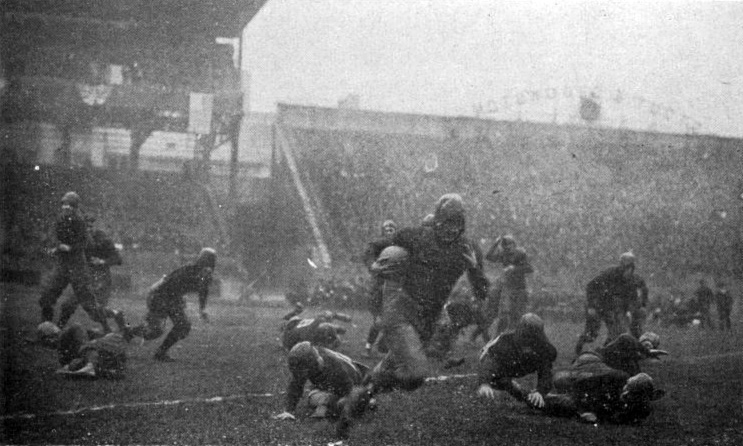
- Pitt's Tom Davies running on Georgia Tech.
- Number of bowls: 1
- Champion(s): Michigan; Pittsburgh

The 1918 college football season was a season of college football in the United States. There was no consensus champion, with the Official NCAA Division I Football Records Book listing Michigan and Pittsburgh as national champions.

World War I's impact on colleges in the country, and the Spanish flu pandemic of 1918 eliminated most of that year's scheduled college football games. However, to boost morale of the troops, many military organizations fielded teams to play against collegiate programs. This is exemplified no more strongly than in a letter published in the Spalding Guide from US president Woodrow Wilson:

"It would be difficult to over-estimate the value of football experience as a part of a soldier's training. The army athletic directors and the officers in charge of special training schools in the cantoments have derived excellent results from the use of elementary football and other personal contact games as an aid in developing the aggressiveness, initiative and determination of recruits, and the ability to carry on in spite of bodily hurts or physical discomforts. These qualities, as you well know, were the outstanding characteristics of the American soldier." -Woodrow Wilson (1919 letter)

A huge military offensive was planned by the Allied countries in the spring of 1919, so all able-bodied men of ages 18 to 20 were scheduled to be drafted in the fall of 1918. As an alternative, the men were offered the option of enlisting in the Student Army Training Corps, known as SATC, which would give them a chance to pursue (or continue pursuing) their educations at the same time as they participated in a 12-week war-training session. This was essentially an alternative to boot camp. The colleges were paid by the government to train the future soldiers, which enabled many of them to avoid closure. The program began on October 1, 1918. Most of the students who were potential football players were under the auspices of the War Department's SATC program.

In an early September meeting between college and War Department officials in Plattsburg, Missouri it became clear that the training regimen envisioned for the soldiers could be incompatible with participation in intercollegiate athletics. On September 13, 1918, newspapers around the country reported that the War Department had asked colleges to reexamine their football schedules. In August and September, athletics backers successfully argued that athletics training was an important part of military training, and the season was back on.

The influenza outbreak was colloquially called Spanish flu. Most flu outbreaks disproportionately kill juvenile, elderly, or already weakened patients, but the 1918 pandemic predominantly killed previously healthy young adults. To maintain morale, wartime censors minimized early reports of illness and mortality in Germany, the United Kingdom, France, and the United States. Papers were free to report the epidemic's effects in neutral Spain (such as the grave illness of King Alfonso XIII). This created a false impression of Spain as especially hard hit, thereby giving rise to the pandemic's nickname, "Spanish Flu". By the end of the pandemic, between three and five percent of the world population had died as a result, making it one of the deadliest natural disasters in human history.

== Conference and program changes ==
| School | 1917 Conference | 1918 Conference |
|---|---|---|
| Carlisle Indians | Independent | School closed |
| Southern Methodist Mustangs | Independent | Southwest |

== Season summary ==
Perhaps the highest profile game was a highly publicized War Charities benefit staged at Forbes Field in Pittsburgh in front of many of the nation's top sports writers, including Walter Camp. The game pitted John Heisman's undefeated, unscored upon, and defending national champion Georgia Tech Yellow Jackets against "Pop" Warner's Pittsburgh Panthers who were sitting on a 30-game win streak. Pitt defeated Georgia Tech 32–0.

== Rose Bowl ==
The Rose Bowl, then the only bowl game, pitted the Mare Island Marines of California and the Great Lakes Navy from Illinois. It was a celebration of victory following the end of fighting in World War I on November 11, 1918. Great Lakes Navy defeat Mare Island, 17–7.

== Conference standings ==
=== Major conference standings ===
1918 Big Ten Conference football standings
| | Conf. | | | | | Overall |
| Team | W | | L | | T | W | | L | | T |
|---|---|---|---|---|---|---|---|---|---|---|
| Michigan + | 2 | – | 0 | – | 0 | 5 | – | 0 | – | 0 |
| Illinois + | 4 | – | 0 | – | 0 | 5 | – | 2 | – | 0 |
| Purdue + | 1 | – | 0 | – | 0 | 3 | – | 3 | – | 0 |
| Iowa | 2 | – | 1 | – | 0 | 6 | – | 2 | – | 1 |
| Minnesota | 2 | – | 1 | – | 0 | 5 | – | 2 | – | 1 |
| Northwestern | 1 | – | 1 | – | 0 | 2 | – | 2 | – | 1 |
| Wisconsin | 1 | – | 2 | – | 0 | 3 | – | 3 | – | 0 |
| Indiana | 0 | – | 0 | – | 0 | 2 | – | 2 | – | 0 |
| Ohio State | 0 | – | 3 | – | 0 | 3 | – | 3 | – | 0 |
| Chicago | 0 | – | 5 | – | 0 | 4 | – | 6 | – | 1 |
$ – Conference champion

1918 Missouri Valley Conference football standings
| Drake | – | 3 | – | 2 | – | 0 |
| Iowa State | – | 0 | – | 3 | – | 0 |
| Kansas | – | 2 | – | 2 | – | 0 |
| Kansas State | – | 4 | – | 1 | – | 0 |
| Missouri | – | 0 | – | 0 | – | 0 |
| Nebraska | – | 2 | – | 3 | – | 1 |
| Washington University | – | 6 | – | 0 | – | 0 |
Due to events related to World War I and the 1918 flu pandemic, the Missouri Valley Intercollegiate Athletic Association did not schedule any official conference games, recorded no standings, and awarded no title for 1918. Additionally, Missouri canceled their season.

1918 Pacific Coast Conference football standings
| | Conf. | | | | | Overall |
| Team | W | | L | | T | W | | L | | T |
|---|---|---|---|---|---|---|---|---|---|---|
| California $ | 2 | – | 0 | – | 0 | 7 | – | 2 | – | 0 |
| Oregon | 2 | – | 1 | – | 0 | 4 | – | 2 | – | 0 |
| Washington | 1 | – | 1 | – | 0 | 1 | – | 1 | – | 0 |
| Oregon Agricultural | 0 | – | 2 | – | 0 | 2 | – | 4 | – | 0 |
$ – Conference champion

1918 Rocky Mountain Conference football standings
| | Conf. | | | | | Overall |
| Team | W | | L | | T | W | | L | | T |
|---|---|---|---|---|---|---|---|---|---|---|
| Colorado Mines $ | 2 | – | 0 | – | 0 | 4 | – | 0 | – | 0 |
| Denver | 3 | – | 1 | – | 0 | 3 | – | 2 | – | 0 |
| Colorado | 1 | – | 2 | – | 0 | 2 | – | 3 | – | 0 |
| Colorado College | 1 | – | 2 | – | 0 | 1 | – | 2 | – | 0 |
| Colorado Agricultural | 0 | – | 2 | – | 0 | 0 | – | 2 | – | 0 |
$ – Conference champion

1918 South Atlantic Intercollegiate Athletic Association football standings
| | Conf. | | | | | Overall |
| Team | W | | L | | T | W | | L | | T |
|---|---|---|---|---|---|---|---|---|---|---|
| VPI $ | 3 | – | 0 | – | 0 | 7 | – | 0 | – | 0 |
| Davidson | 2 | – | 0 | – | 0 | 2 | – | 1 | – | 1 |
| Richmond | 1 | – | 0 | – | 0 | 3 | – | 1 | – | 1 |
| Maryland State | 2 | – | 0 | – | 1 | 4 | – | 1 | – | 1 |
| Johns Hopkins | 0 | – | 0 | – | 1 | 0 | – | 0 | – | 1 |
| NC State | 0 | – | 1 | – | 0 | 1 | – | 3 | – | 0 |
| St. John's (MD) | 0 | – | 1 | – | 0 | 0 | – | 1 | – | 0 |
| William & Mary | 0 | – | 1 | – | 0 | 0 | – | 2 | – | 0 |
| VMI | 0 | – | 2 | – | 0 | 1 | – | 3 | – | 0 |
| Washington and Lee | 0 | – | 2 | – | 0 | 1 | – | 2 | – | 0 |
| Georgetown | 0 | – | 0 | – | 0 | 3 | – | 2 | – | 0 |
$ – Conference champion

1918 Southern Intercollegiate Athletic Association football standings
| | Conf. | | | | | Overall |
| Team | W | | L | | T | W | | L | | T |
|---|---|---|---|---|---|---|---|---|---|---|
| Georgia Tech $ | 3 | – | 0 | – | 0 | 6 | – | 1 | – | 0 |
| Vanderbilt | 2 | – | 0 | – | 0 | 4 | – | 2 | – | 0 |
| Mississippi A&M | 2 | – | 0 | – | 0 | 3 | – | 2 | – | 0 |
| Clemson | 3 | – | 1 | – | 0 | 5 | – | 2 | – | 0 |
| South Carolina | 2 | – | 1 | – | 1 | 2 | – | 1 | – | 1 |
| Furman | 1 | – | 3 | – | 0 | 3 | – | 5 | – | 1 |
| Sewanee | 0 | – | 1 | – | 0 | 3 | – | 2 | – | 0 |
| The Citadel | 0 | – | 1 | – | 1 | 0 | – | 2 | – | 1 |
| Auburn | 0 | – | 2 | – | 0 | 2 | – | 5 | – | 0 |
| Ole Miss | 0 | – | 2 | – | 0 | 1 | – | 3 | – | 0 |
| Wofford | 0 | – | 2 | – | 0 | 0 | – | 3 | – | 0 |
$ – Conference champion; There were several SIAA schools that did not field a team due to World War I.

1918 Southwest Conference football standings
| | Conf. | | | | | Overall |
| Team | W | | L | | T | W | | L | | T |
|---|---|---|---|---|---|---|---|---|---|---|
| Texas | 4 | – | 0 | – | 0 | 9 | – | 0 | – | 0 |
| Oklahoma | 2 | – | 0 | – | 0 | 6 | – | 0 | – | 0 |
| Texas A&M | 1 | – | 1 | – | 0 | 6 | – | 1 | – | 0 |
| Rice | 1 | – | 1 | – | 0 | 1 | – | 5 | – | 1 |
| SMU | 1 | – | 2 | – | 0 | 4 | – | 2 | – | 0 |
| Arkansas | 0 | – | 1 | – | 0 | 3 | – | 2 | – | 0 |
| Oklahoma A&M | 0 | – | 2 | – | 0 | 4 | – | 2 | – | 0 |
| Baylor | 0 | – | 2 | – | 0 | 0 | – | 6 | – | 0 |
No champion recognized; Rankings from AP Poll

=== Independents ===
1918 military service football records
| | Conf. | | | Overall |
| Team | W | L | T | W | | L | | T |
|---|---|---|---|---|---|---|---|---|
| Camp Greenleaf | | – | | 9 | – | 0 | – | 0 |
| Chicago Naval Reserve | | – | | 7 | – | 0 | – | 0 |
| Mare Island Marines | | – | | 10 | – | 1 | – | 0 |
| Great Lakes Navy | | – | | 7 | – | 0 | – | 2 |
| League Island Marines | | – | | 7 | – | 1 | – | 0 |
| Cleveland Naval Reserve | | – | | 5 | – | 1 | – | 0 |
| Camp Hancock | | – | | 4 | – | 1 | – | 2 |
| Camp Upton | | – | | 4 | – | 1 | – | 2 |
| Camp Taylor | | – | | 3 | – | 1 | – | 1 |
| Camp Lewis | | – | | 7 | – | 2 | – | 0 |
| Camp Devens | | – | | 4 | – | 2 | – | 0 |
| Mather Field | | – | | 2 | – | 1 | – | 0 |
| Camp Dodge | | – | | 2 | – | 1 | – | 1 |
| Camp Grant | | – | | 3 | – | 3 | – | 0 |
| Camp Dix | | – | | 1 | – | 2 | – | 2 |
| Camp Gordon | | – | | 2 | – | 4 | – | 0 |
| Camp Perry | | – | | 2 | – | 4 | – | 0 |
| Georgia Eleventh Cavalry | | – | | 0 | – | 1 | – | 0 |
| Mineola Aviation Station | | – | | 0 | – | 3 | – | 0 |

1918 Eastern college football independents records
| | Conf. | | | Overall |
| Team | W | L | T | W | | L | | T |
|---|---|---|---|---|---|---|---|---|
| Bucknell | | – | | 6 | – | 0 | – | 0 |
| Princeton | | – | | 3 | – | 0 | – | 0 |
| Holy Cross | | – | | 2 | – | 0 | – | 0 |
| Army | | – | | 1 | – | 0 | – | 0 |
| Buffalo | | – | | 6 | – | 1 | – | 0 |
| Columbia | | – | | 5 | – | 1 | – | 0 |
| Syracuse | | – | | 5 | – | 1 | – | 0 |
| Pittsburgh | | – | | 4 | – | 1 | – | 0 |
| Boston College | | – | | 5 | – | 2 | – | 0 |
| Rutgers | | – | | 5 | – | 2 | – | 0 |
| Franklin & Marshall | | – | | 2 | – | 1 | – | 0 |
| Geneva | | – | | 4 | – | 2 | – | 0 |
| Swarthmore | | – | | 4 | – | 2 | – | 0 |
| Harvard | | – | | 2 | – | 1 | – | 0 |
| Fordham | | – | | 4 | – | 2 | – | 1 |
| Villanova | | – | | 3 | – | 2 | – | 0 |
| Penn | | – | | 5 | – | 3 | – | 0 |
| Dartmouth | | – | | 3 | – | 3 | – | 0 |
| Lehigh | | – | | 4 | – | 4 | – | 0 |
| Washington & Jefferson | | – | | 2 | – | 2 | – | 0 |
| New Hampshire | | – | | 2 | – | 2 | – | 1 |
| Lafayette | | – | | 3 | – | 4 | – | 0 |
| Brown | | – | | 2 | – | 3 | – | 0 |
| Tufts | | – | | 2 | – | 3 | – | 0 |
| Penn State | | – | | 1 | – | 2 | – | 1 |
| Vermont | | – | | 0 | – | 1 | – | 1 |
| Drexel | | – | | 0 | – | 1 | – | 0 |
| NYU | | – | | 0 | – | 4 | – | 0 |

1918 Midwestern college football independents records
| | Conf. | | | Overall |
| Team | W | L | T | W | | L | | T |
|---|---|---|---|---|---|---|---|---|
| Detroit Junior College | | – | | 4 | – | 0 | – | 0 |
| Central Michigan | | – | | 1 | – | 0 | – | 0 |
| Marquette | | – | | 2 | – | 0 | – | 1 |
| Heidelberg | | – | | 5 | – | 1 | – | 0 |
| Lincoln (MO) | | – | | 3 | – | 1 | – | 0 |
| St. Xavier | | – | | 4 | – | 1 | – | 1 |
| Notre Dame | | – | | 3 | – | 1 | – | 2 |
| Butler | | – | | 2 | – | 1 | – | 1 |
| Western State Normal | | – | | 3 | – | 2 | – | 0 |
| Saint Louis | | – | | 3 | – | 2 | – | 1 |
| Michigan Agricultural | | – | | 4 | – | 3 | – | 0 |
| Akron | | – | | 2 | – | 2 | – | 1 |
| St. Mary's (OH) | | – | | 1 | – | 1 | – | 0 |
| Toledo | | – | | 1 | – | 1 | – | 0 |
| Nebraska | | – | | 2 | – | 3 | – | 1 |
| Michigan State Normal | | – | | 1 | – | 2 | – | 0 |
| Iowa State Teachers | | – | | 1 | – | 3 | – | 0 |
| Wabash | | – | | 1 | – | 3 | – | 0 |
| Fairmount | | – | | 1 | – | 4 | – | 0 |
| Haskell | | – | | 1 | – | 4 | – | 0 |
| Lake Forest | | – | | 0 | – | 1 | – | 0 |
| Detroit | | – | | 0 | – | 2 | – | 0 |

1918 Southern college football independents records
| | Conf. | | | Overall |
| Team | W | L | T | W | | L | | T |
|---|---|---|---|---|---|---|---|---|
| Centre | | – | | 4 | – | 0 | – | 0 |
| Presbyterian | | – | | 2 | – | 0 | – | 0 |
| Navy | | – | | 4 | – | 1 | – | 0 |
| Kentucky | | – | | 2 | – | 1 | – | 0 |
| Southwest Texas State | | – | | 4 | – | 2 | – | 1 |
| Tennessee (SATC) | | – | | 3 | – | 2 | – | 0 |
| Oglethorpe | | – | | 5 | – | 3 | – | 0 |
| Delaware | | – | | 1 | – | 2 | – | 2 |
| North Texas State Normal | | – | | 1 | – | 2 | – | 1 |
| Wake Forest | | – | | 1 | – | 2 | – | 0 |
| West Tennessee State Normal | | – | | 2 | – | 4 | – | 0 |
| Florida | | – | | 0 | – | 1 | – | 0 |

1918 Western college football independents records
| | Conf. | | | Overall |
| Team | W | L | T | W | | L | | T |
|---|---|---|---|---|---|---|---|---|
| Hawaii | | – | | 3 | – | 1 | – | 0 |
| USC | | – | | 2 | – | 2 | – | 2 |
| Washington State | | – | | 1 | – | 1 | – | 0 |
| Gonzaga | | – | | 0 | – | 2 | – | 1 |
| Saint Mary's | | – | | 0 | – | 7 | – | 0 |

=== Minor conferences ===
| Conference | Champion(s) | Record |
|---|---|---|
| Central Intercollegiate Athletics Association | No champion | — |
| Inter-Normal Athletic Conference of Wisconsin | No champion | — |
| Kansas Collegiate Athletic Conference | College of Emporia | — |
| Michigan Intercollegiate Athletic Association | No champion | — |
| Nebraska Intercollegiate Conference | Unknown | — |
| Ohio Athletic Conference | Wittenberg | 3–0 |
| Oklahoma Intercollegiate Conference | No champion | — |
| Southern California Intercollegiate Athletic Conference | No champion | — |
| Southern Intercollegiate Athletic Conference | Talladega | — |

=== Minor conference standings ===
1918 Colored Intercollegiate Athletic Association football standings
| | Conf. | | | | | Overall |
| Team | W | | L | | T | W | | L | | T |
|---|---|---|---|---|---|---|---|---|---|---|
| Lincoln (PA) | 2 | – | 0 | – | 0 | 5 | – | 0 | – | 0 |
| Virginia Union | 1 | – | 0 | – | 1 | 1 | – | 0 | – | 1 |
| Hampton | 1 | – | 1 | – | 1 | 1 | – | 1 | – | 1 |
| Howard | 0 | – | 3 | – | 0 | 0 | – | 3 | – | 0 |

1918 Illinois Intercollegiate Athletic Conference football standings
| | Conf. | | | | | Overall |
| Team | W | | L | | T | W | | L | | T |
|---|---|---|---|---|---|---|---|---|---|---|
| Carthage | 0 | – | 1 | – | 0 | 1 | – | 2 | – | 0 |

1918 Ohio Athletic Conference football standings
| | Conf. | | | | | Overall |
| Team | W | | L | | T | W | | L | | T |
|---|---|---|---|---|---|---|---|---|---|---|
| Wittenberg $ | 3 | – | 0 | – | 0 | 4 | – | 0 | – | 0 |
| Miami (OH) | 4 | – | 0 | – | 1 | 5 | – | 0 | – | 1 |
| Mount Union | 5 | – | 1 | – | 0 | 6 | – | 1 | – | 0 |
| Wooster | 5 | – | 1 | – | 0 | 6 | – | 1 | – | 0 |
| Western Reserve | 5 | – | 1 | – | 0 | 5 | – | 2 | – | 0 |
| Ohio | 1 | – | 0 | – | 1 | 4 | – | 0 | – | 1 |
| Cincinnati | 0 | – | 0 | – | 2 | 3 | – | 0 | – | 2 |
| Ohio Wesleyan | 2 | – | 2 | – | 0 | 3 | – | 2 | – | 0 |
| Case | 2 | – | 3 | – | 2 | 3 | – | 5 | – | 2 |
| Akron | 1 | – | 2 | – | 1 | 2 | – | 2 | – | 1 |
| Oberlin | 1 | – | 4 | – | 0 | 1 | – | 4 | – | 0 |
| Baldwin–Wallace | 0 | – | 4 | – | 1 | 5 | – | 4 | – | 1 |
| Kenyon | 0 | – | 4 | – | 0 | 1 | – | 4 | – | 0 |
| Ohio Northern | 0 | – | 5 | – | 0 | 1 | – | 5 | – | 0 |
| Denison | 0 | – | 5 | – | 0 | 1 | – | 6 | – | 0 |
| Ohio State * | 3 | – | 0 | – | 0 | 3 | – | 3 | – | 0 |
$ – Conference champion; * – did not complete for championship

== Awards and honors ==
=== All-Americans ===
The consensus All-America team included:

| Position | Name | Height | Weight (lbs.) | Class | Hometown | Team |
|---|---|---|---|---|---|---|
| QB | Frank Murrey | | | So. | | Princeton |
| HB | Tom Davies | 5'8" | 158 | Fr. | Gas City, Indiana | Pittsburgh |
| HB | Wolcott Roberts | 5'7" | 160 | So. | Elmwood, Illinois | Navy |
| FB | Tank McLaren | | 185 | Sr. | Pittsburgh, Pennsylvania | Pittsburgh |
| E | Paul Robeson | 6'3" | 219 | Sr. | Princeton, New Jersey | Rutgers |
| T | Pete Henry | 5'10" | 230 | Jr. | Mansfield, Ohio | Washington & Jefferson |
| T | Lou Usher | | | Jr. | Chicago, Illinois | Syracuse |
| G | Doc Alexander | 5'11" | 210 | So. | Silver Creek, New York | Syracuse |
| C | Bum Day | 5'10" | 190 | Fr. | Nashville, Georgia | Georgia Tech |
| C | Jack Depler | 5'10" | 220 | So. | Lewistown, Illinois | Illinois |
| G | Lyman Perry | | | Sr. | Andover, Ohio | Navy |
| T | Leonard Hilty | | | Sr. | Pittsburgh, Pennsylvania | Pittsburgh |
| T | Joe Guyon | 5'11" | 184 | Sr. | Magdalena, New Mexico | Georgia Tech |
| E | Bill Fincher | 6'0" | 182 | So. | Atlanta, Georgia | Georgia Tech |

=== Statistical leaders ===
- Receptions leader: Bernard Kirk, Notre Dame, 7
