= 1918 All-Eastern football team =

American all-star college football team

The 1918 All-Eastern football team consists of American football players chosen by various selectors as the best players at each position among the Eastern colleges and universities during the 1918 college football season.

== All-Eastern selections ==
=== Quarterbacks ===
- Skip Gougler, Pittsburgh (RK-1)
- Bill Ingram, Navy (RK-2)

=== Halfbacks ===
- Tom Davies, Pittsburgh (RK-1)
- Bill Butler, Navy (RK-1)

=== Fullbacks ===
- George McLaren, Pittsburgh (RK-1)

=== Ends ===
- Paul Robeson, Rutgers (RK-1)
- Bud Hopper, Penn (RK-1)

=== Tackles ===
- Leonard Hilty, Pittsburgh (RK-1)
- Lou Usher, Syracuse (RK-1)
- Jim Neylon, Penn (RK-2)
- Pard Larkin, Swarthmore (RK-2)

=== Guards ===
- Jake Stahl, Pittsburgh (RK-1)
- Doc Alexander, Syracuse (RK-1)
- Lyman Perry, Navy (RK-2)

=== Centers ===
- Sam Arthur, Navy (RK-1)
- Herb Stein, Pittsburgh (RK-2)

== Key ==
- RK = Ross E. Kauffman

== See also ==
- 1918 College Football All-America Team
