= Sterk =

Sterk is a Dutch descriptive surname meaning "strong". A variant form is Sterck. The Hungarian surname Sterk and the Slavic surname Šterk may have independent origins. It may refer to:

- Claire E. Sterk (born 1957), Dutch anthropologist, provost of Emory University
- Jane Sterk (born 1947), Canadian psychologist, businesswoman, academic, and politician
- Jim Sterk (born 1956), College athletic director
- Károly Sterk (1881–1946), Hungarian chess master
- Katalin Sterk (born 1961), Hungarian high jumper
- Maria Sterk (born 1979), Dutch marathon speed skater
- Marijn Sterk (born 1987), Dutch football defender
- Mieke Sterk (1946–2026), Dutch pentathlete and Labour Party politician
- Mirjam Sterk (born 1973), Dutch politician, civil servant, RTV editor and educator
- Rafael Sterk (born 1978), Australian water polo player
- Stewart Sterk (born 1952), American legal scholar
- Valerie Sterk (born 1975), American volleyball player
- Wilhelm Sterk (1880–1944), Hungarian-born Austrian librettist
- Yuri Sterk (born 1962), Bulgarian diplomat, Ambassador, Permanent Representative to UN Office in Geneva

Sterck

- Joachim Sterck van Ringelbergh (c.1499–c.1531), Flemish humanist, mathematician and astrologer
- Marita de Sterck (born 1955), Flemish writer
- Thomas Sterck (1900–1970), American football player

Stêrk

- Nisti Stêrk (born 1977), Swedish-Kurdish actress and comedian

Šterk

- Jure Šterk (1937–2009), Slovenian long-distance sailor and author
- Vladimir Šterk (1891–1941), Croatian architect

== See also ==
- Stark (surname), equivalent German surname
- Sterk Door Combinatie Putten, known as SDC Putten, is a football club from Putten, the Netherlands
- Door Oefening Sterk or VV DOS, football club from Utrecht, Netherlands
- Door Wilskracht Sterk or AFC DWS, a Dutch football club from Amsterdam
- Jeanette Sterke (born 1933), Czech-born British actress
- Sterkh
- Sterkia
- Sterksel
- Sterky
- Sterków
