= 1918 Pittsburgh Panthers football team =

American college football season

1918 Pittsburgh Panthers football
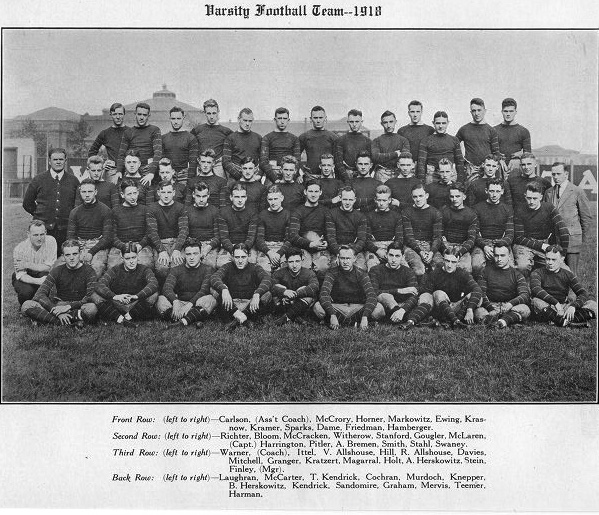

National champion (Helms, Houlgate) Co-national champion (NCF)
- Conference: Independent
- Record: 4–1
- Head coach: Pop Warner (4th season)
- Offensive scheme: Double wing
- Captain: George McLaren
- Home stadium: Forbes Field

1918 Eastern college football independents records
	Conf.			Overall
Team	W	L	T	W		L		T
Bucknell		–		6	–	0	–	0
Princeton		–		3	–	0	–	0
Holy Cross		–		2	–	0	–	0
Army		–		1	–	0	–	0
Buffalo		–		6	–	1	–	0
Columbia		–		5	–	1	–	0
Syracuse		–		5	–	1	–	0
Pittsburgh		–		4	–	1	–	0
Boston College		–		5	–	2	–	0
Rutgers		–		5	–	2	–	0
Franklin & Marshall		–		2	–	1	–	0
Geneva		–		4	–	2	–	0
Swarthmore		–		4	–	2	–	0
Harvard		–		2	–	1	–	0
Fordham		–		4	–	2	–	1
Villanova		–		3	–	2	–	0
Penn		–		5	–	3	–	0
Dartmouth		–		3	–	3	–	0
Lehigh		–		4	–	4	–	0
Washington & Jefferson		–		2	–	2	–	0
New Hampshire		–		2	–	2	–	1
Lafayette		–		3	–	4	–	0
Brown		–		2	–	3	–	0
Tufts		–		2	–	3	–	0
Penn State		–		1	–	2	–	1
Vermont		–		0	–	1	–	1
Drexel		–		0	–	1	–	0
NYU		–		0	–	4	–	0

The 1918 Pittsburgh Panthers football team represented the University of Pittsburgh in the 1918 college football season. In a season cut short by the Spanish flu pandemic, coach Pop Warner led the Panthers in a schedule played all in one month, including a convincing victory in a highly publicized game over defending national champion and unscored-upon Georgia Tech. A highly controversial loss ended the season and snapped a 32-game Pitt winning streak, but the Panthers outscored opponents 140–16 in that short season and were retroactively selected as the national champion by the Helms Athletic Foundation and Houlgate System and as a co-national champion with Michigan by the National Championship Foundation.

== Schedule ==
Date	Opponent	Site	Result	Attendance	Source
November 9	Washington & Jefferson	Forbes Field; Pittsburgh, PA	W 34–0	16,000–18,000	
November 16	Penn	Forbes Field; Pittsburgh, PA	W 37–0		
November 23	Georgia Tech	Forbes Field; Pittsburgh, PA	W 32–0	30,000	
November 28	Penn State	Forbes Field; Pittsburgh, PA (rivalry)	W 28–6	6,000	
November 30	at Cleveland Naval Reserve	League Park; Cleveland, OH	L 9–10	15,000	

== Preseason ==
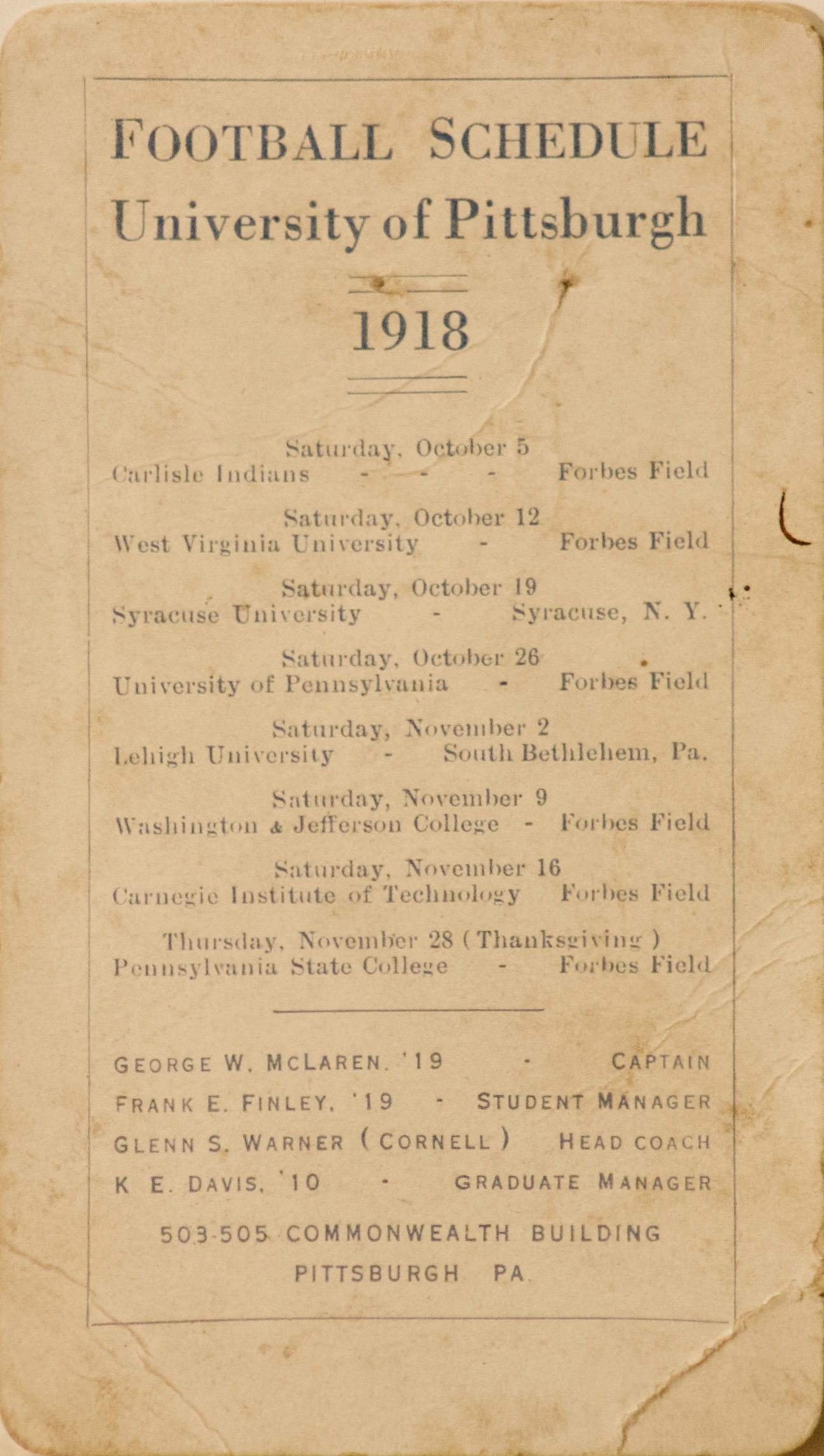
1918 Pitt football pocket schedule

"Although 1918 was a war year, and many problems threatened from time to time to put an end to college athletics., Pitt stuck manfully to the ship and 'Kept the Home Fires Burning'. With the exception of baseball, which was abolished due to lack of interest, hardly directly chargeable to war conditions, the other major sports—football, basketball and track—were kept going." "Football had a hard row to hoe in 1918." Only five games were actually played due to the war and pandemic sweeping the nation. "The usual training trip to 'Camp Hamilton,' Windber, Pa. was dispensed with." The one year residence rule was called off by all the big schools, which helped bolster their rosters since the army had depleted them. After numerous shifts were made to the schedule, due to the government imposed quarantine, only three of the original games scheduled were played -Washington & Jefferson, Penn and Penn State. Georgia Tech was played for the benefit of the War Charities, and was the highlight of the season. $25,000 was donated from the proceeds of the game. Pitt played a post season game against the Cleveland Naval Reserves and lost by one point. "It was a most unsatisfactory game in many ways and marred Pitt's record of straight victories started in 1915."

In the May 1st issue of The Pitt Weekly Karl E. Davis, Graduate Manager of Athletics, informed the students and alumni of the plans for the 1918 football season. "THE UNIVERSITY WILL BE REPRESENTED BY A FOOTBALL TEAM THIS FALL, unless something entirely "unforeseen" happens between now and then. We will have Glenn Warner back with us; we will send the team to Windber for training September 15, and we have enough tried material in school to develop a good team...Football training is the greatest training imaginable for war...All other college sports at Pitt depend for their finances on the football receipts." At this time Mr. Davis had an eight game schedule booked.(see photo)

The following timetable shows the "unforeseen" headlines that led up to the 1918 football season at Pitt:

July 14 – Pitt Football Plans For Coming Season Are Now Complete – "First game October 5 against Carlisle."

July 18 – Carlisle Indian School Permanently Abandoned - "The Carlisle (Pa.) Indian School has been permanently abandoned and turned over to the War Department...and its 700 students transferred to other Indian schools."

September 8 – Great Lakes Naval Training Eleven Will Open Local Season at Forbes Field - "Their meeting with the (Great Lakes) Naval Training team takes the place of the game originally scheduled with the Carlisle Indians."

September 9 – Authorities Await Word From Washington About The Future of Football - "There is danger of the game being abolished for the term of the war. As a consequence of these changes in the program, athletic authorities at Pitt have decided not to have training season at its famous camp. All male students, physically fit, over 18 years of age, will be under the control of the Students Army Training Corps and they will therefore be subject to military discipline. They will live in a barracks and draw the pay of a private. They will devote 42 hours to academic work and 13 to military each week. These 55 hours will take up all their time, and it remains to be seen whether the War Department will permit the commanding officer at the institution sanctioning football. What will apply to one college will apply to all."

September 13 – War Department Advises Institutions Not to Make Plans For Coming Season - "There will be no Intercollegiate football this fall, judging from a Washington dispatch late yesterday afternoon, which stated that the War Department had advised colleges and universities with student army training corps 'not to make plans for football schedules this fall'."

September 14 – Problem is Put Up to Commandants at Camps to Solve, Says War Dispatch – "The War Department in Washington yesterday announced that football programs at colleges and universities with Army student training corps units would not be interrupted except where they would actually interfere with the military training. Indications are that Pitt, Tech, and W. & J. will surely play, as the commandants at these places are said to have expressed approval of the schedules being carried out."

September 15 – Pitt Gridders Eager for First Game with Team From Great Lakes – "It is believed by Athletic Director Charles S. Miller and other members of the athletic committee that it will be possible to go through with all the games scheduled and still meet the requirements of Uncle Sam as to the scholastic and military drilling to be done by every man who is enrolled under the Students' Army Training Corps."

September 28 – October Football is Banned – "Col. R. L. Reese of the army general staff, who is in supreme charge of the student army training corps, has announced that during the month of October football players would not be allowed to leave the universities except on Saturday afternoon, and that only this period can be devoted to the gridiron sport, which means that it will be impossible to play contests requiring out of town travel. During the month of November the men playing football will be permitted to leave their universities on Friday evening, but must return Sunday night." The opening game against the Great Lakes Naval team could probably be played.

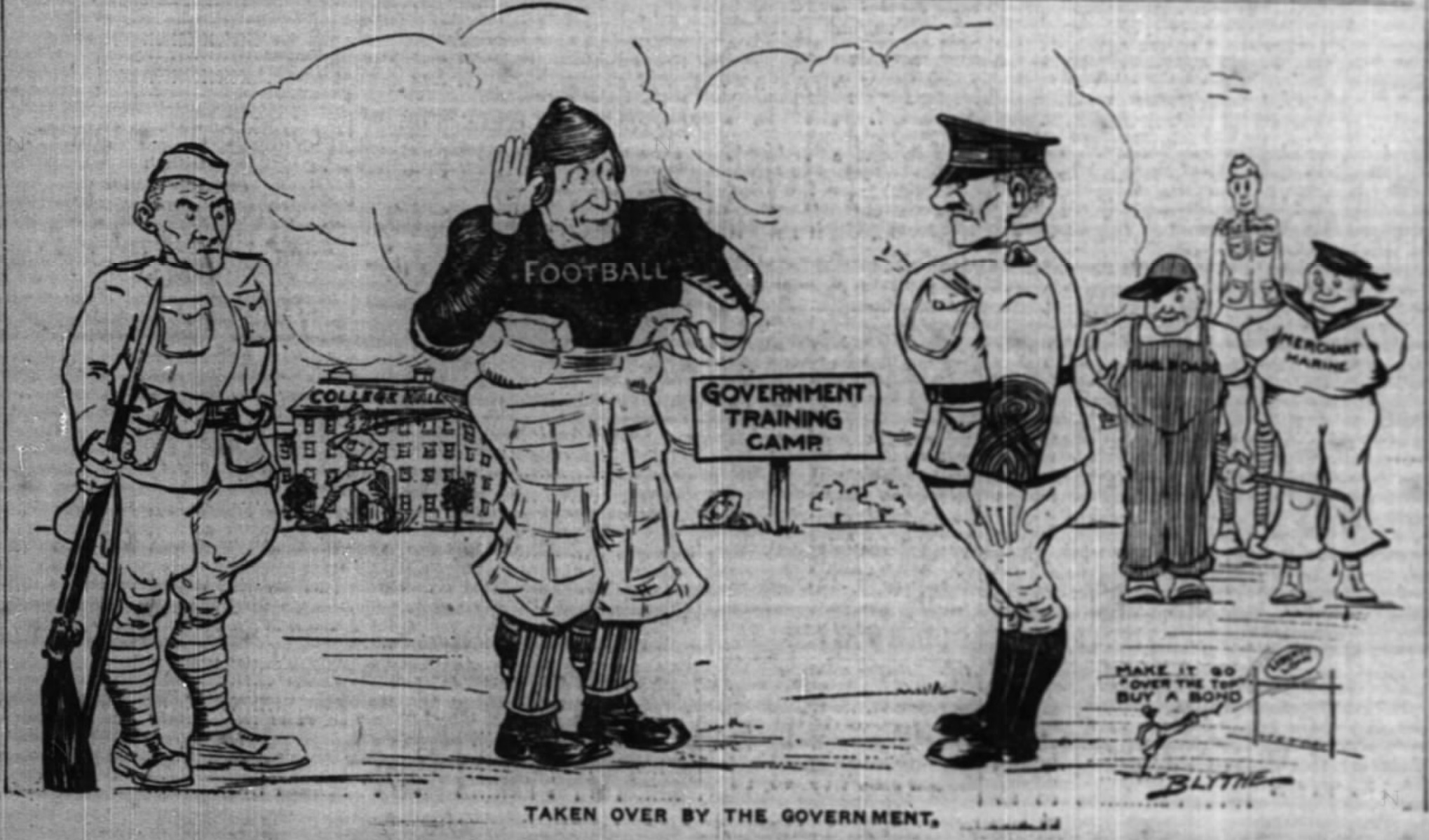
Cartoon showing Government involvement in college football 1918 during war and pandemic

October 1 – Over 3500 Men Inducted In S.A.T.C. – "I pledge allegiance to my flag and the Republic for which it stands; one nation indivisible, with Liberty and Justice for all. At high noon on Tuesday more than 3500 young men took this oath of allegiance in unison and became members of the Students' Army Training Corps of the University of Pittsburgh. Simultaneously at 500 colleges and universities in all parts of the United States took that same pledge of loyalty and approximately 150,000 young men began the course which is expected to prepare them for commissions as officers."

October 2 – All-Star Sailor Team to Arrive Here Friday: Interest is Widespread – "Word was received last night by Graduate manager of Athletics K. E. Davis of the University of Pittsburgh that the (Great Lakes) Jackies in charge of Lieut. Commander Kauffman and Coach Herman Olcott will arrive in this city on Friday for their game with the Panthers at Forbes Field on Saturday."

October 2 – Shifts Made in Schedule – "Pitt authorities are still in the dark regarding the ruling by Col. Rees against October football trips. Meanwhile, Manager Davis has gone quietly about the rearrangement of his schedule. New Pitt Schedule = Oct. 5 – Great Lakes at home; Oct. 12 – West Virginia at home; Oct. 19 – Detroit Naval Training Station at home; Oct. 26 – Carnegie Tech at home; Nov. 2 – Lehigh University at South Bethlehem; Nov. 9 – University of Pennsylvania at home; Nov. 16 – Syracuse University at Syracuse, NY; Nov.23 – W. & J. at home; Nov. 28 – Penn State at home."

October 3 – Players Eliminated by Federal Official's Order; But 37 of 60 Survive – "Coach Warner last night cut down his Pitt football squad from 60 to 37 men. This was done by government order. Harman and Graham are too young to be enrolled in the S.A.T.C., and can therefore be carried in addition to 35 others." Also, the graduate manager received the formal copy of football activities permissible during October from Col. Rees.

October 5 – Pitt and Great Lakes Won't Play Because of the Influenza Epidemic – "The Pitt football team will have to wait until a later date, next Saturday perhaps with West Virginia, to open its 1918 football season, for the scheduled game with the Great Lakes team for this afternoon, was called off yesterday afternoon on account of the influenza epidemic throughout the state. Most of the Pitt players are in quarantine in their barracks.”

October 8 – Authorities Won't Permit Eleven to Come Here Next Saturday to Play Pitt – The Pitt-West Virginia football game scheduled to be played at Pittsburgh next Saturday was definitely cancelled today by receipt of a ruling from the Committee on Education to the effect that the West Virginia team must leave Morgantown not earlier than noon on Saturday and return before taps."

October 10 – Panthers Will Not Go to Beaver Falls For Contest Next Saturday – "A proposal to play a football game at Beaver falls next Saturday was received a few days ago by the University of Pittsburgh football authorities from the manager of the team at Geneva (College). The opinion of the army officers was that the game should not be played, and Manager Davis, therefore, called everything off, as he has been careful all along to abide by the spirit as well as the letter of every ruling made by Col. Wolf and his staff."

October 13 – Plaid Authorities Decide Game as Collegiate Sport Unwise Now – "Carnegie Tech has suspended its football activities for the present season at least."

October 17 – Pitt Cancels Game With Sailors Next Saturday Due to Influenza Ban – "There will be no football game in Pittsburgh next Saturday (Oct. 19). Karl E. Davis, last night notified the manager of the Detroit Naval Training Station team, which was scheduled to meet the Panthers at Forbes Field, that the game had been cancelled."

October 18 – Warner and his Squad to See W. - J. Play – "This afternoon all the members of the Panther squad who are not in quarantine will go to Washington, Pa., to witness the game there between Washington & Jefferson college and the Camp Sherman team from Chillicothe, O. The influenza epidemic is not raging very furiously at Washington, and the health authorities there have not banned football games, holding that the crowds who gather outdoors at such spectacles are doing the best thing to keep influenza away.”

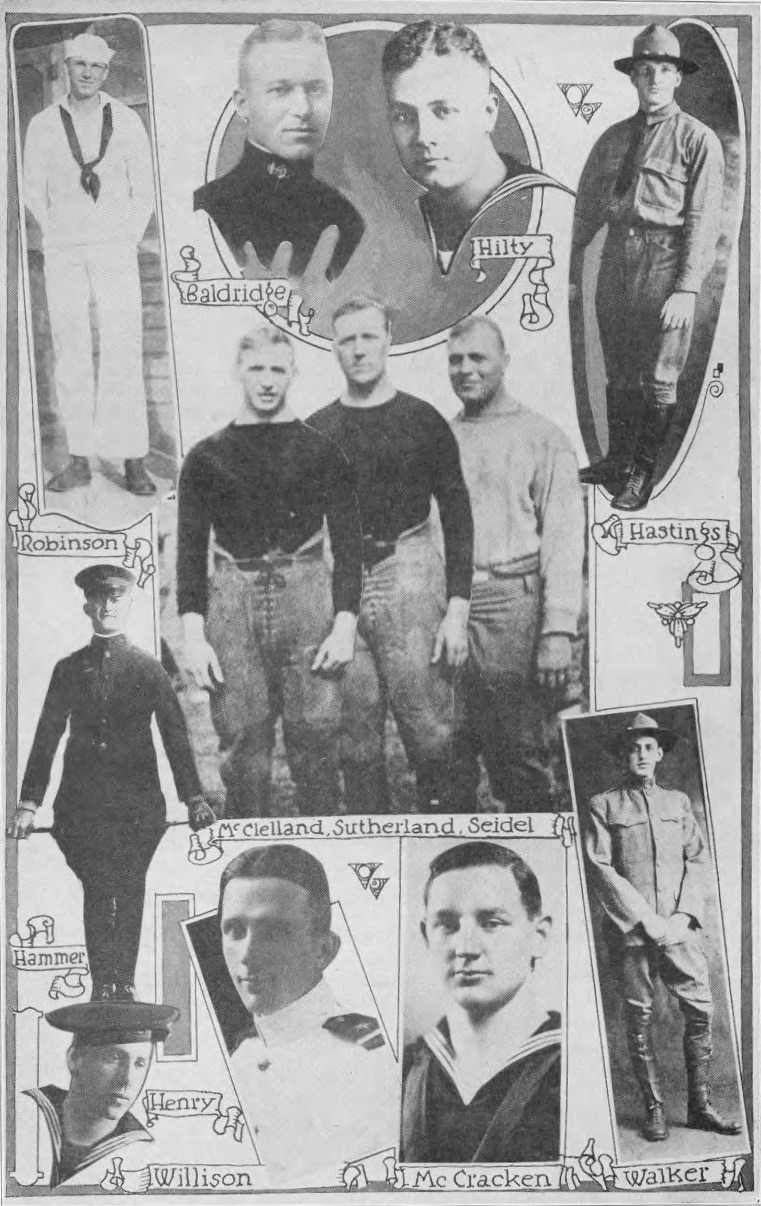
Lettermen in the Service 1918

October 20 – Pitt Will Have Good Game Here Next Saturday if City Health Ban Is Soon Lifted – “Concerning the report from New York yesterday that Pitt would play a game with Georgia Tech's 'Golden Tornado' at Forbes Field on Monday, November 11, the proceeds to go to the United War Work Committee's athletic fund, the Pitt authorities said last night they knew nothing of any proposed contest."

October 26 – War Fund Committee Arranges for the Big Contest at Forbes Field – "The Georgia Tech football team will come to Forbes Field Saturday, November 23, to play Pitt." The telegram from W.S. Langford, chairman of the football committee and W. W. Roper, secretary of the national sports committee stated: "Your letter received. We are arranging to have Georgia Tech play in Pittsburgh November 23 for the benefit of the United War Work Fund. Have wired Syracuse to release your game and arrange another for them. Georgia Tech anxious to play. Have unqualified approval of War Department."

October 29 – Pitt Loses Services of Karl Davis – "Karl E. Davis, graduate manager of athletics at the University of Pittsburgh, left last night to enter the officers' training camp of the United States Army Motor transport Corps at Camp Joseph E. Johnson, Jacksonville, Fla."

October 30 – Charley Miller is Asked to Arrange for Game at Forbes Field Next Tuesday – "Charles S. Miller, director of athletics at Pitt, received a wire yesterday morning from W. S. Langford, chairman of the football committee of the United War Work campaign drive for funds, asking if the local team would play Rutgers in Pittsburgh Tuesday of next week. Miller ...wired back that it would be impossible for Pitt to take on the game."

November 1 – Game is Called Off as Influenza Ban Still On; Panthers Sixth Cancellation – "The Pitt team will not depart for South Bethlehem tonight to play Lehigh tomorrow in Taylor Field, as per schedule. Coach Reiter of Lehigh called Director Miller at Pitt over the long-distance telephone yesterday and told him the ban on public gatherings was still in force in South Bethlehem, and therefore it was out of the question to consider the game...tomorrow will be the sixth idle Saturday for the Panthers this fall."

November 9 — Royer Lifts Grip Ban on Pittsburgh; Effective Noon Today — "Formal permission was given yesterday by Dr. B. Franklin Royer, acting state commissioner of health, for lifting of the influenza ban at noon today in Pittsburgh."

November 9 — Pitt Tackles Red and Black — "So far as football fans are concerned, all roads lead to Forbes Field, where the celebrated Pitt Panthers will pry off the lid with the Washington & Jefferson college team as their opponent."

November 11 — War is Over Truce is Signed — "The world war ended this morning at 6 o'clock Washington time, 11 o'clock Paris time."

== Coaching staff ==
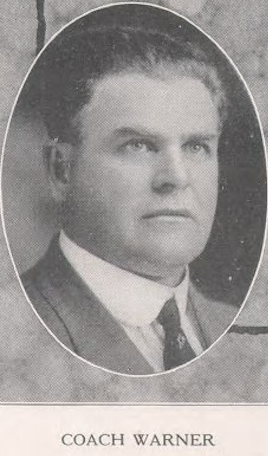
Glenn Warner

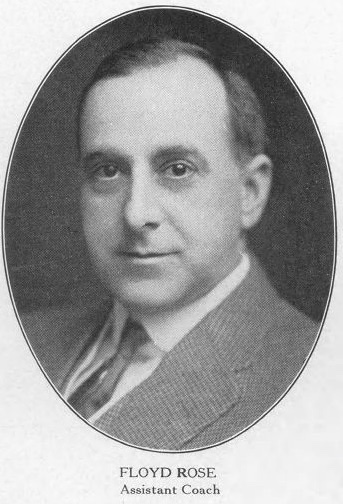
Floyd Rose

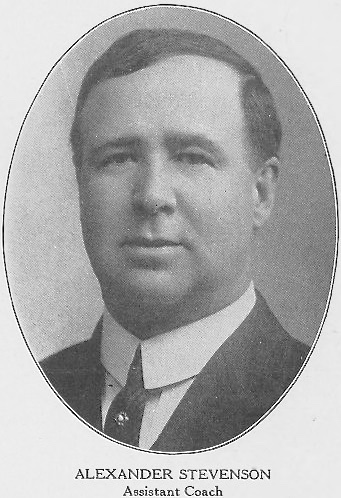
Alexander Stevenson

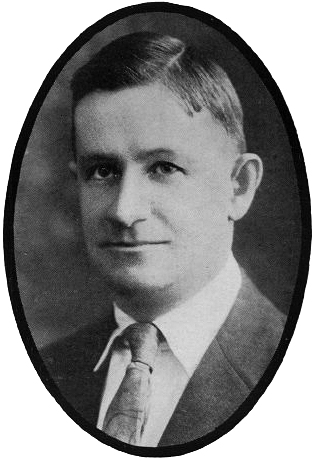
Andrew Kerr

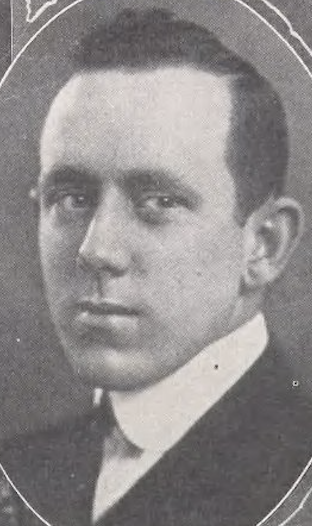
Frank E. Finley

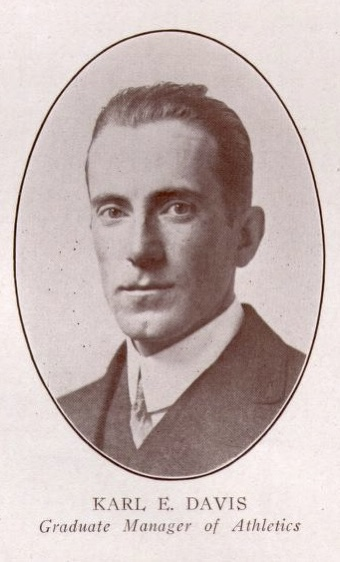
Karl E. Davis

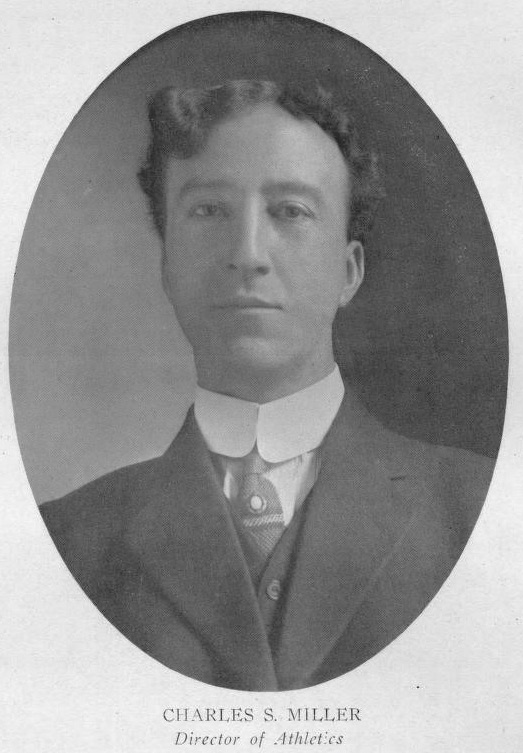
Charles S. Miller

1918 Pittsburgh Panthers football staff
Coaching staff: Glenn "Pop" Warner – Head coach; Floyd Rose – Assistant coach; Alexander Stevenson – Assistant coach; Andrew Kerr – Freshman Coach	Support staff: Frank E. Finley – Student football manager; Karl E. Davis – Graduate manager of athletics; Charles S. Miller – Director of athletics

== Roster ==
1918 Pittsburgh Panthers football roster
Player	Position	Games	Height	Weight	Class	Prep School	Degree	Residence
George McClaren*	fullback	4	5' 9"	174	1919	Peabody H.S.	Economics	Pittsburgh, PA
Roy A. Easterday*	halfback	4	5' 8"	148	1919	Lisbon H. S. (Ohio)	Economics	Lisbon, OH
Skip Gougler*	quarterback	5	5' 8"	156	1919	Harrisburg H. S.	College	Harrisburg, PA
William E. Harrington*	end	4	5' 8"	155	1918	Conway Hall	Associate Economics	Bentlyville, PA
Leonard F. Hilty*	tackle	5	5' 10"	183	1918	Peabody H. S.	Economics	Pittsburgh, PA
Thomas R. Kendrick Jr.*	center	3	5' 8"	178	1918	Duquesne H. S.	College	Duquesne, PA
Edward A. Stahl*	guard	4	5' 11"	184	1919	Bellefonte Academy	Economics	Scranton, PA
Clyde Mitchell*	tackle	1	5' 10"	155	1919	Vandergrift H. S.	Dental School	Mahaffey, PA
Leland Stanford*	guard	2	5' 10"	175	1919	Bellefonte Academy	Dental School	Sheffield, PA
Charles V. Allshouse*	center	4	5' 11"	195	1919	Allegheny College	Dental School	Versailles, PA
George R. Allshouse*	end	5	6'	176	1919	Tarentum H.S.	Dental School	Versailles, PA
F. M. Ewing	end	3	5' 9"	160	1921	The Kiski School	Dental School	Saltsburg, PA
Herbert McCracken*	quarterback	4	5' 8"	166	1921	Sewickley H. S.	Economics	Sewickley, PA
Thomas Davies*	halfback	5	5' 8"	153	1921	The Kiski School	Economics	Washington, PA
Harry C. McCarter*	end	4	5' 10"	160	1920	Beaver Falls H. S.	Medical School	Beaver Falls, PA
Louis Mervis*	tackle	5	5' 6"	175	1921	Braddock H. S.	Economics	Braddock, PA
David Pitler*	quarterback	2	5' 7"	140	1919	Fifth Avenue H. S.	Dental School	Pittsburgh, PA
Louis Markowitz	guard	2	5' 7"	188	1921	McKees Rocks H. S.	Dental School	McKees Rocks, PA
Herb Stein*	center	4	5' 11"	182	1921	The Kiski School	Economics	Niles, OH
Braden H. Swaney	tackle	1	5' 9"	178	1921	Uniontown H.S.	Dental School	Uniontown, PA
W. W. Horner*	quarterback	3	5' 8"	157	1921	New Castle H. S.	Dental School	New Castle, PA
T. J. Hamburger	fullback	3	5' 6"	161	1921	Lock Haven H. S.	Dental School	Lock Haven, PA
A. Herskowitz	tackle	1	5' 10"	160	1921	Wilkinsburg H. S.	Dental School	Wilkinsburg, PA
Bernard Sandomire	halfback	1	5' 7"	152	1921	Indiana Normal		
C. Teemer	guard	1	5' 11"	173	1921	McKeesport H. S.		McKeesport, PA
Henry Magarrall	center	1	5' 10"	162	1921	Westinghouse H.S.	Chemistry	Pittsburgh, PA
Alex Meanor	guard	1	6'	193	1921	Fifth Avenue H. S.	Economics	Pittsburgh, PA
Harvey Harman*	tackle	2	5' 11"	189	1921	Peabody H. S.	College	Pittsburgh, PA
Ben Breman	tackle	0	5' 8"	161	1921	Peabody H. S.	Dental School	Pittsburgh, PA
A. J. Breman	fullback	0	5' 9"	174	1921	Indiana Normal	College	Pittsburgh, PA
Davis Graham	guard	0	6' 1"	178	1921	McKees Rocks H. S.	College	McKees Rocks
Nathan Friedman	halfback	0	5' 5"	153	1921	McKeesport H. S.	Medical School	McKeesport, PA
W. F. Murdoch	tackle	0	5' 11"	165	1921	Peabody H. S.	Engineering	Pittsburgh, PA
Oscar Kratzert	tackle	0	5' 10"	173	1921	Woodlawn H. S.	Dental School	Woodlawn, PA
John McCrory	end	0	5' 11"	159	1921	Wilkinsburg H. S.	Dental School	Wilkinsburg, PA
John Laughran	halfback	0	5' 9"	150	1921	Braddock H. S.	Economics	Rankin, PA
W. V. Campbell	halfback	0	5' 10"	157	1921	Homestead H. S.		Homestead, PA
Louis Hill	end	0	5' 8"	154	1921	Mercersburg Academy		
F. E. Finley*	manager	0			1919	Wilkinsburg H. S.	Economics	Wilkinsburg, PA
* Letterman

== Game summaries ==
=== Washington & Jefferson ===
Game 1: Washington & Jefferson at Pitt

Team	1	2	3	4	Total
W. & J.	0	0	0	0	0
• Pitt	14	13	7	0	34

- Date: November 9, 1918
- Location: Forbes Field
  Pittsburgh, PA
- Game start: 2:30 p.m.
- Game attendance: 16,000 – 18,000
- Referee: Robert W. Maxwell (Swarthmore)

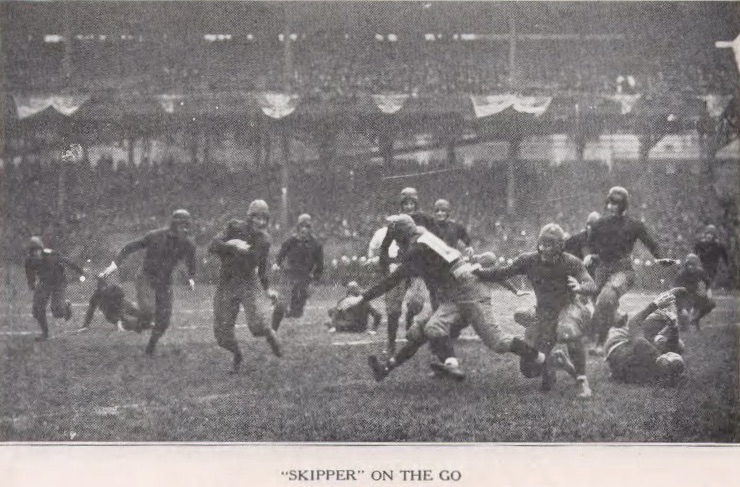
Pitt halfback "Skip" Gougler, 1918 game action

On November 9, Harry Keck of The Pittsburgh Post noted: "The war may not be over just yet, but the flu ban is or will be at noon today, and the Pitt football team's period of idleness halts at 2:30 p. m., so that about evens up matters."

The Red and Black were led by first-year coach Ralph Hutchinson and sported a 2–0 record. Tackle Pete Henry and end John Tressel were named to the Walter Camp All-American team.

"Both teams are in the best of shape. Two more fit Pitt and Wash-Jeff teams never took the field than those that will trot out this afternoon. Having had lots of time, they have been able to prime well for the meeting."

Ralph Davis of The Pittsburg Press reported: "The Pitt Panthers opened their curtailed football season yesterday at Forbes Field with a one-sided victory over the Washington & Jefferson college team, the final score being 34 to 0. Thus, for the fourth time in succession the Panthers have won the gridiron championship of Western Pennsylvania. They established a new record yesterday, for it was the first time in the history of athletic relations between the two schools that the locals have taken four games in a row from the Red and Black. Yesterday's victory was the twenty-ninth in succession for the Pittites, who have not been defeated since W. & J. under Coach Bob Folwell, turned the trick five years ago."

Richard Guy of The Gazette Times noted: "There was not one feature in which the players from Washington showed to better advantage than did Pitt's, and it was therefore a comparatively easy matter for Glenn Warner's charges to score the 34 points, distributed throughout the first three periods: 14 in the first, 13 in the second and 7 in the third. They represented touchdowns by Easterday, twice; McLaren, twice; and Davies once; with four resultant goals, two each by Gougler and Davies."

Harry Keck of The Pittsburgh Sunday Post was impressed: "It was the initial contest of the season for the Panthers and, for them, an impressive opening indeed. The game was anything but impressive from a Wash-Jeff viewpoint. If there are any players on his squad whom Pop Warner did not press into service before the final whistle was blown, they must have been hiding under the bench. He gave his entire string the once over in action. On the whole, the Pitt team this season looks every bit as strong as last year's eleven, and by the time the Georgia Tech game rolls around it should be much better."

The New York Times set the tone for the rest of November: “Glenn Warner's Pittsburgh Panthers came out of obscurity for the first time this season and ably demonstrated the usual Pittsburgh power and dash by smothering Washington and Jefferson by 34 to 0....Pittsburgh again seeks gridiron laurels of the highest. The showing of the Panthers was such as to raise the hopes of football followers for a battle pre-eminent when Pittsburgh and Georgia Tech get together later this month in a game for the War Work Fund....The Tech-Pittsburgh contest should develop into one of the greatest gridiron feasts ever concocted.”

The Pitt lineup for the game against Washington & Jefferson was Harry McCarter (left end), Leonard Hilty (left tackle), Edward Stahl (left guard), Herb Stein (center), Vance Allshouse (right guard), Lou Mervis (right tackle), William Harrington (right end), William Horner (quarterback), Roscoe Gougler (left halfback), Roy Easterday (right halfback) and George McLaren (fullback). Substitutes appearing in the game for Pitt were Fred Ewing, Ray Allshouse, David Pitler, Clyde Mitchell, Leland Stanford, Harvey Harman, Thomas Kendrick, Herb McCracken, Bernard Sandomire, Tom Davies, Braden Swaney, T. Hamburger, A. Herskowitz, Louis Markowitz, C. Teemer, Alex Meanor and Henry Maggarrall. The game was played in 15-minute quarters.

=== Penn ===
Game 2: Penn at Pitt

Team	1	2	3	4	Total
Penn	0	0	7	0	7
• Pitt	9	14	7	7	37

- Date: November 16, 1918
- Location: Forbes Field
  Pittsburgh, PA
- Game start: 2:30 p.m.
- Referee: Nathan Tufts (Brown)

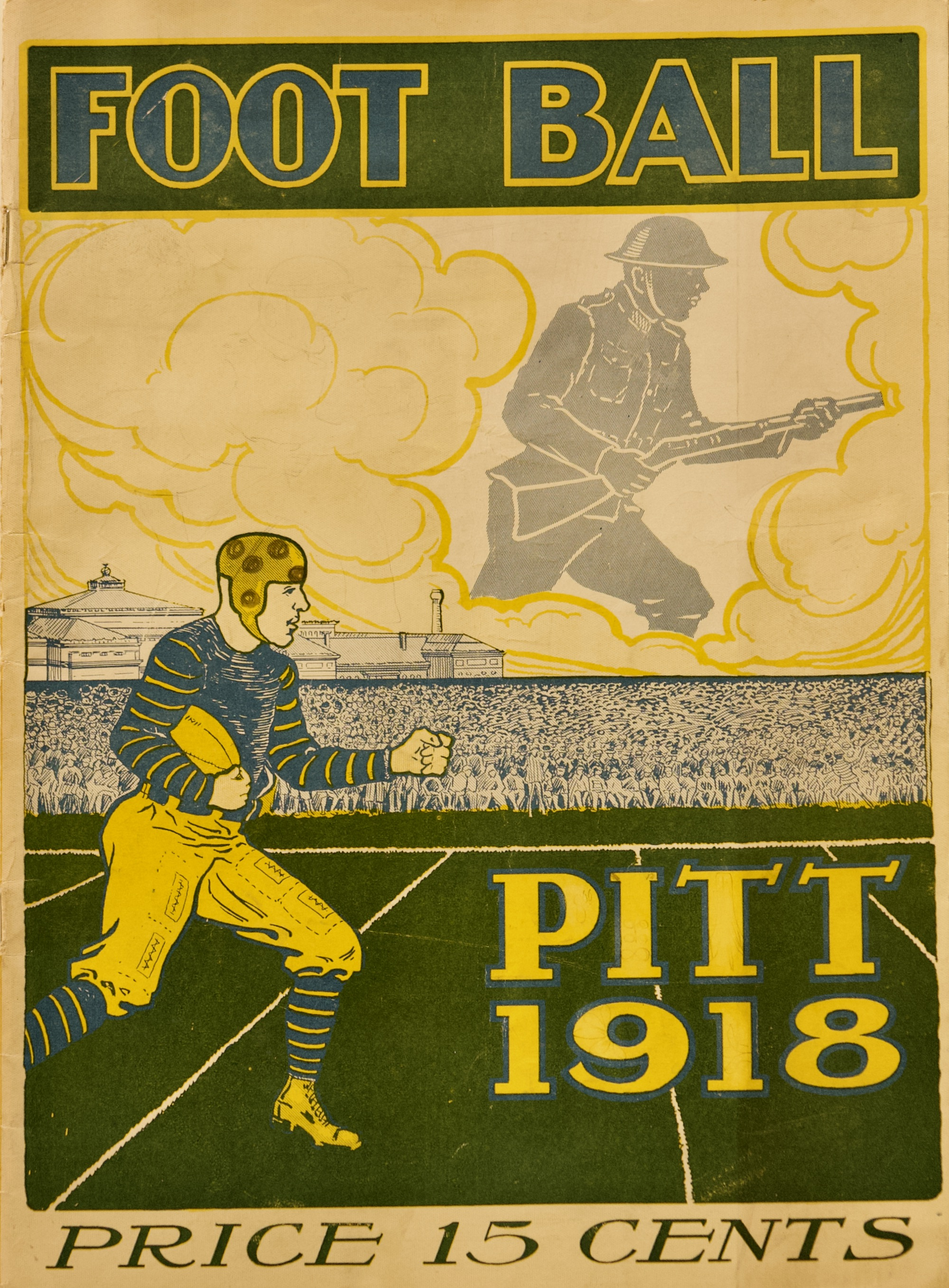
1918 University of Pittsburgh ninth annual football yearbook used for home game programs

On Friday, November 15, Harry Keck of The Pittsburgh Post reported: "Two Pitt first-string players were dropped from the squad yesterday for alleged infractions of the training rules. They are Dave Pitler, quarterback candidate, and Bill Harrington, varsity end. Coach Warner made the following statement 'Football ethics and discipline come ahead of winning games at Pitt, and men who are guilty of infractions of the rules will be dropped....Discipline must be maintained, even if we have to weaken our team to maintain it'."

The 1918 Penn Quakers were coached by both Bob Folwell and Bill Hollenback and had a 3–2 record. The Quakers right end Robert Hopper was named to Walter Camp's 1918 first team All-American squad. The Pittsburg Press reported that Penn was confident. "'Penn is going out to Pittsburg determined to win on Saturday'. This is the message which Graduate Manager of Athletics Edward R. Bushnell, of the University of Pennsylvania football team, has sent to Pittsburg."

Robert W. Maxwell of the Evening Ledger (Philadelphia) wrote "The only things which interfered with Penn's weekend visit to Pittsburgh were the University of Pittsburgh football team, five touchdowns, four goals and a goal from field, all of which totaled 37 points. This constituted the margin of victory, or something like that, and sent the Red and Blue off the field with the fourth defeat in as many years. Outside of that, however, a good time was had by all."

Harry Keck of The Pittsburgh Sunday Post was impressed: "The Pitt Panther juggernaut ran roughshod over another foe at Forbes Field yesterday. The Hollenback-Folwell coached University of Pennsylvania eleven was the victim and the steam-rollering was accomplished to the tune of 37–0. A fumble by a Pitt substitute halfback on the three-yard line late in the fourth quarter prevented another touchdown being added to the total. Penn did not make a single first down in the game, either by rushing or aided by Pitt penalties. A small crowd witnessed the game, the devotees evidently saving up their appetites and loose coin for the Georgia Tech War Fund attraction next Saturday."

"Pitt scored a touchdown five minutes after the game began after Easterday's gains had carried the ball to the one-yard line, and then over. Gougler missed goal. The visiting team held pretty well for a while, and Pitt could not get nearer the goal line than the 32-yard line, from where Davies kicked a field goal." First quarter score: Pitt 9 to Penn 0.

Early in the second quarter, Davies, McCracken and Gougler advanced the ball to the Penn one-yard line "and then McCracken bucked over. Davies kicked the goal." Pitt forced the Quakers to punt. A few plays later, "Davies got tired of fooling around. He carried the ball into the line, was stopped, and, as previously recorded, wriggled his way clear and ran over the goal line after a 37 yard dash. He also kicked goal." Pitt missed two field goals to close out the half and led 23 to 0.

Mid-third quarter Pitt gained possession on the Penn 49-yard line. "A forward pass, McCracken to Gougler, gained 21 yards of the distance for first down on the 15, and Gougler lugged the ball over on three straight plays, after which he nonchalantly kicked 'gool'." Pitt 30 to Penn 0. Late third quarter, "Hamburger intercepted one of Penn's forward passes on his 37–yard line. Short gains by Pitt brought the ball to midfield and another forward pass, McCracken to Gougler, netted 18 more for Pitt. Gougler, McCracken and Hamburger carried the ball to Penn's nine-yard line before the quarter ended. McCarter got five and then Hamburger went over. Gougler kicked goal. Score, 37–0."

The Pitt lineup for the game against Penn was Harry McCarter (left end), Leonard Hilty (left tackle), Edward Stahl (left guard), Herb Stein (center), Vance Allshouse (right guard), Lou Mrevis (right tackle), Ray Allshouse (right end), Roscoe Gougler (quarterback), Tom Davies (left Halfback), Roy Easterday (right halfback) and Herb McCracken (fullback). Substitutes appearing in the game for Pitt were Louis Markowitz, William Horner, T. J. Hamburger, Thomas Kendrick, Nathan Friedman and Clyde Mitchell. The game was played in 12-minute quarters.

=== Georgia Tech ===
Game 3: Georgia Tech at Pittsburgh

Team	1	2	3	4	Total
Ga. Tech	0	0	0	0	0
• Pitt	7	7	12	6	32

- Date: November 23
- Location: Forbes Field
  Pittsburgh, PA
- Game start: 2:30 p.m.
- Game attendance: 30,000
- Referee: Tufts (Brown)

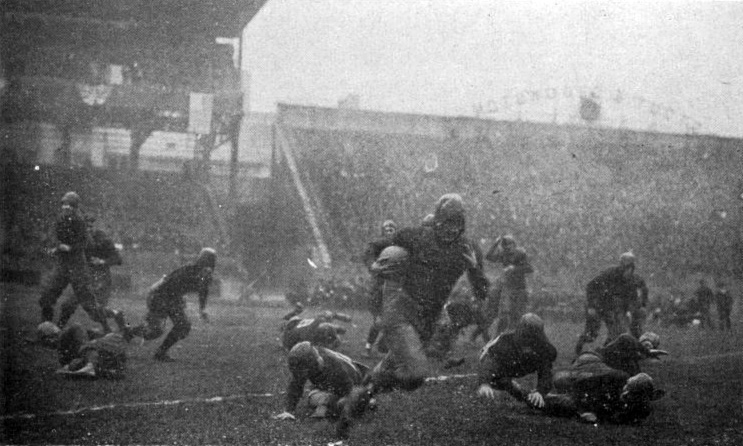
Pitt's Tom Davies runs against undefeated and unscored upon Georgia Tech in the 1918 game at Forbes Field. Pitt won the game 32–0 and is considered by many to be that season's national champion.

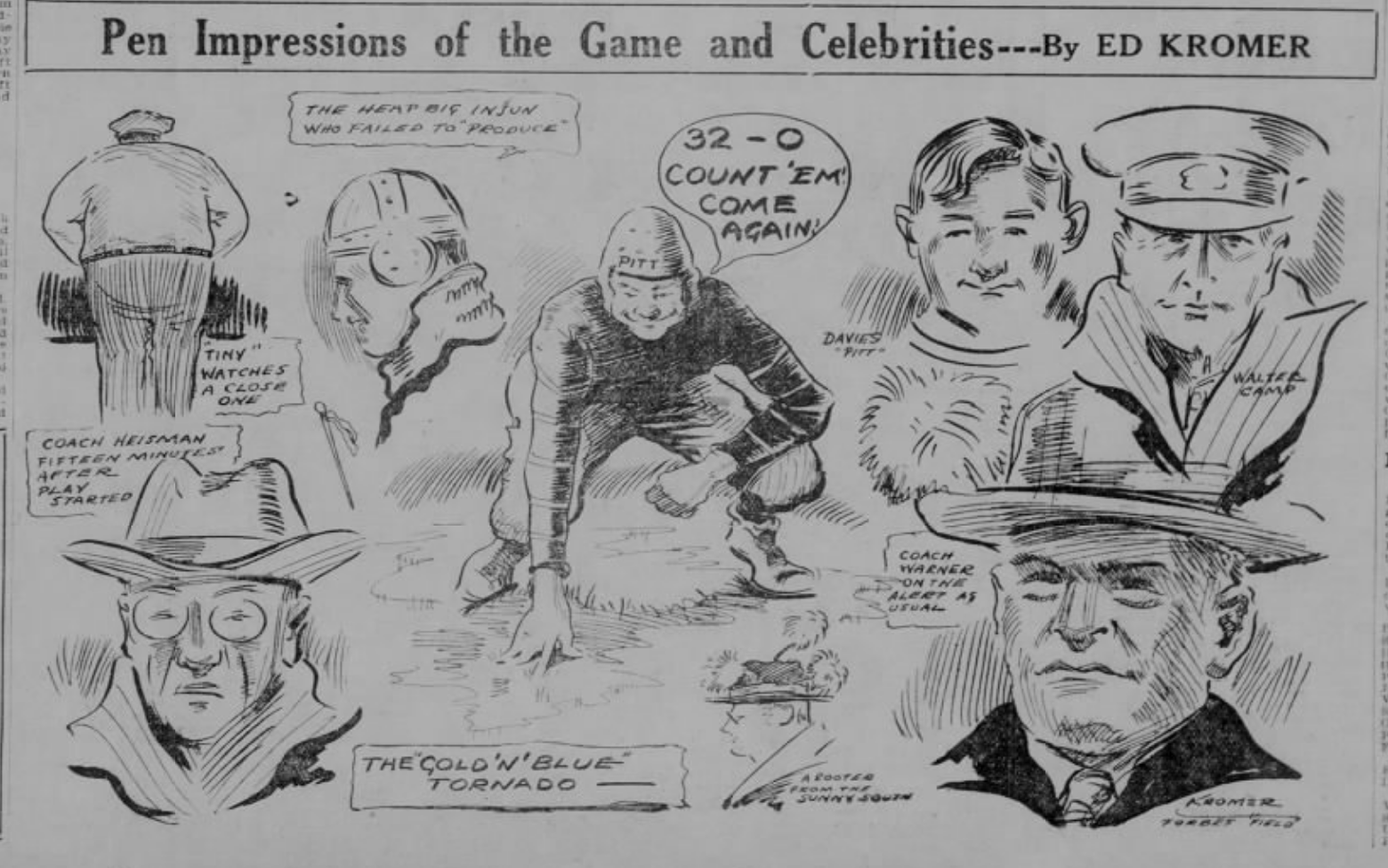
Cartoonist's impressions of the 1918 Pitt vs. Georgia Tech game

"Never before in the history of football in Pittsburgh has so much interest been evinced in a single game. According to Joe Donnelly, of Spalding's, the crowds which flocked to that agency for tickets when the advance sale opened was the greatest he has ever known... They (Panthers) realize that the eyes of the entire football world will be upon them, and they are depended upon by lovers of the sport all over this section of the country to uphold the honor of the north against the south."

Dick Jemison of The Atlanta Constitution was excited: "The Jackets are set, ready for the whistle, in the best possible condition that careful nursing can put them in and with as much football crammed into their respective and collective beans as it is possible to cram into a green aggregation. The Young Tornado is as fit as one season of football can make it. About the proudest and happiest man in the bunch (going north) will be the writer. He is going along to endeavor to tell the readers of The Constitution in Sunday morning's paper how the green Yellow Jackets of 1918 upheld the traditions of Georgia Tech and trampled the colors of the veteran Panthers in the dust."

On November 23, John Heisman, on a 33-game winning streak, brought his undefeated (5–0) 1918 Georgia Tech Golden Tornadoes north for the United Work War Fund game against the Panthers, owning a 30-game winning streak of their own. The Golden Tornadoes had out-scored their opponents 425–0 in their previous five games. But Coach Heisman was not optimistic according to the Daily Post interview: "We do not expect to beat Pitt, and, in fact, if we should win, I would be the most amazed man on the field. Last year we had a great team and might have won from your Pittsburgh team, but not now. We realize that we have been invited North to play for the War Work Fund merely on the strength of our 1917 reputation. We are willing to do anything to help along the good cause, and, for that reason, if need be, will take a beating and stand to have our long string of victories broken. ...We will fight Pitt to the last ditch and hope for the best...While my boys are husky, they are green – not ripe for a meeting with such a team as Pitt....This is the first time they have ever played off their home field." In spite of being a “green” team, four members of the Yellow Jackets received All-American honors at the conclusion of the season: Bill Fincher (end), Joe Guyon (tackle), Bum Day (center) and Buck Flowers (halfback).

The Pittsburgh Post reported that: "Bill Harrington, varsity end, and David Pitler, one of the first string backs, who were dropped from the squad last week...had been reinstated....Their reinstatement was the result of a petition gotten up by the other players on the squad." "The Pitt players are all in good shape for the big test today. The men who were on the crippled list have been carefully nursed and have been brought back to the pink of condition. 'Katy' Easterday had two bothersome legs for several days, but he was given special treatment and is o.k. now. Capt. McClaren is absolutely fit, and the same holds true of Tom Davies, Pitt's latest wizard, and 'Skip' Gougler, the other dependables in Pitt's backfield."

Coach Warner in 1928 recalled: "The Georgia Tech - Pittsburgh game was arranged as a charity affair and the southerners came to Pittsburgh with a beating of drums and a great blare of trumpets. They brought their band with them, together with a large delegation of rooters, and they fully expected to clean up on Pittsburgh."

Pitt dismantled Georgia Tech 32–0 in front of many of the nation's top sports writers including Walter Camp, ending Tech's 33-game streak without a loss.

Warner historian Francis Powers wrote:

At Forbes Field, the dressing rooms of the two teams were separated only by a thin wall. As the Panthers were sitting around, awaiting Warner's pre-game talk, Heisman began to orate in the adjoining room. In his charge to the Tech squad, Heisman became flowery and fiery. He brought the heroes of ancient Greece and the soldier dead in his armor among the ruins of Pompeii. It was terrific and the Panthers sat, spellbound. When Heisman had finished, Warner chortled and quietly said to his players: 'Okay, boys. There's the speech. Now go out and knock them off.'

Pitt's first score came on a pass from Tom Davies to Katy Easterday. The next score came soon after the start of the second quarter, when Davies returned a punt 50 yards for a touchdown. A double pass got the next score. The fourth touchdown was a 6 yard touchdown by George McLaren. "Guyon and Flowers were very clever at intercepting forward passes, which in a measure made up for the fumbling in an early part of the game." A 55 yard touchdown run by Davies was the final score.

The New York Times was not pleased with the Golden Tornado: "The Southern football menace, which for the last three years has been exciting followers of the sport throughout other sections of the country, has been wiped out and flung aside almost in the twinkling of an eye. The enviable football record achieved by dint of hard work by Georgia Tech failed to stand up under the wrecking methods adopted by Glenn Warner's Pittsburgh Panthers. In one game, Georgia Tech becomes only a team which basked in the limelight of its own supporters and failed miserably when crowded out into the open and given battle by another of mightier mien."

The starting lineup was Harry McCarter (left end), Leonard Hilty (left tackle), Edward Stahl (left guard), Herb Stein (center), Vance Allshouse (right guard), Lou Mervis (right tackle), William Harrington (right end), Roscoe Gougler (quarterback), Roy Easterday (left halfback), Tom Davies (right halfback) and George McLaren (fullback). Coach Warner made only one substitution - Ray Allshouse for Harry McCarter at left end. The game was played in 15-minute quarters.

=== Penn State ===
Game 4: Penn State at Pitt

Team	1	2	3	4	Total
Penn State	6	0	0	0	6
• Pitt	7	7	14	0	28

- Date: November 28, 1918
- Location: Forbes Field
  Pittsburgh, PA
- Game start: 2:30 p.m.
- Game attendance: 6,000
- Referee: J. A. Evans (Williams)

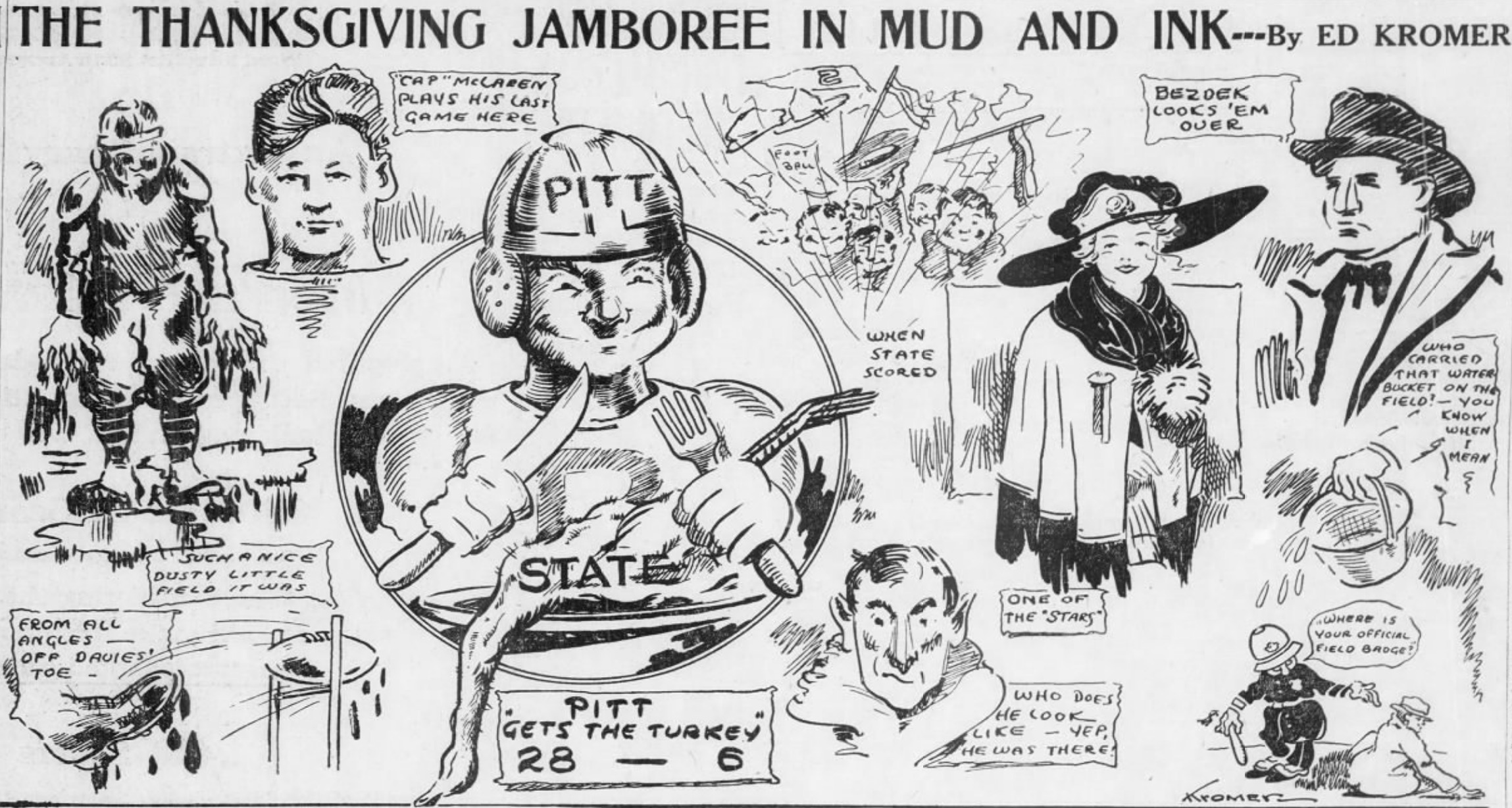
Cartoonist's reactions to the 1918 Pitt vs. State game

On November 28, first year coach Hugo Bezdek brought his Penn State contingent to Forbes Field on Thanksgiving for the annual tussle with Pitt. The Lions were 1–1–1 for the season with their lone victory a 7–6 squeaker over Lehigh on November 16. "The Pitt game is the one big game on their schedule this fall. They can forget all about the other defeats they sustained if they can make a respectable showing against the team which crushed Georgia Tech's hopes, and humbled Penn and W. & J. Today Bezdek's men are in grand fettle, brimful of confidence in their ability to give their celebrated Thanksgiving Day opponents a genuine fight for honors. State may be defeated, but they will not be disgraced nor outclassed."

Pitt was not in as grand fettle as their opponent. Some players (Harry McCarter, Edward Stahl, Herb Stein, Vance Allshouse and Roy Easterday) were nursing injuries from the Georgia Tech game. The starting lineup had Ray Allshouse at end, Harvey Harman and Leland Stanford at guard, Thomas Kendrick at center and Herb McCracken at halfback.

Florent Gibson of The Pittsburgh Post noted: "Pitt and Penn State had one of the smallest crowds that has attended one of their games in years to entertain yesterday afternoon, and one of the sloppiest fields extant on which to stage their annual melee. The field was slippery and as heavy as lead, balking all efforts at fast, snappy football, and handicapping both teams considerably."

Harry Keck of The Pittsburgh Post praised Penn State: "The final score was 28 to 6 in Pitt's favor, and those six points by State represented a touchdown – scored before Pitt itself broke into the tallying column! Incidentally, they were the first points scored against Pitt this season. And, incidentally, too, as a result of having shoved over that touchdown in the first quarter, the green State team completed a record of having scored in every game in which it has participated this fall...Further it was a big boost for Hugo Bezdek, coach of the Blue and White, who in the summer time is manager of the Pittsburgh Pirates...Only two of the men who faced Pitt yesterday are players from last year's squad. Bezdek has turned out a wonderful team."

The New York Tribune had the facts: "The visitors scored after a few minutes of play when they secured the ball on a poor kick by McLaren, the ball being covered in mud. Line smashing sent Captain Unger over for the touchdown, but C.W. Brown failed in his kick at goal. After that play the home team played superior football throughout and scored four touchdowns, Davies kicking four goals." Captain George McLaren scored three touchdowns in his final game at Forbes Field and Tom Davies added one. Coach Warner replaced Davies, McLaren and Gougler for the final period.

The Pitt lineup for the game against Penn State was Ray Allshouse (left end), Leonard Hilty (left tackle), Harvey Harmon (left guard), Thomas Kendrick (center), Leland Stanford (right guard), Lou Mervis (right tackle), William Harrington (right end), Roscoe Gougler (quarterback), Tom Davies (left halfback), Herb McCracken (right halfback) and George McLaren (fullback). Substitutes appearing in the game for Pitt were Fred Ewing, William Horner, David Pitler and T. J. Hamburger. The game was played in 15-minute quarters.

=== Cleveland Naval Reserve ===
Game 5: Pitt at Cleveland Naval Reserves

Team	1	2	3	4	Total
Pitt	6	0	0	3	9
• Cleveland Naval	0	3	0	7	10

- Date: November 30, 1918
- Location: League Park
  Cleveland, OH
- Game attendance: 15,000
- Referee: J. G. Durfee (Williams)

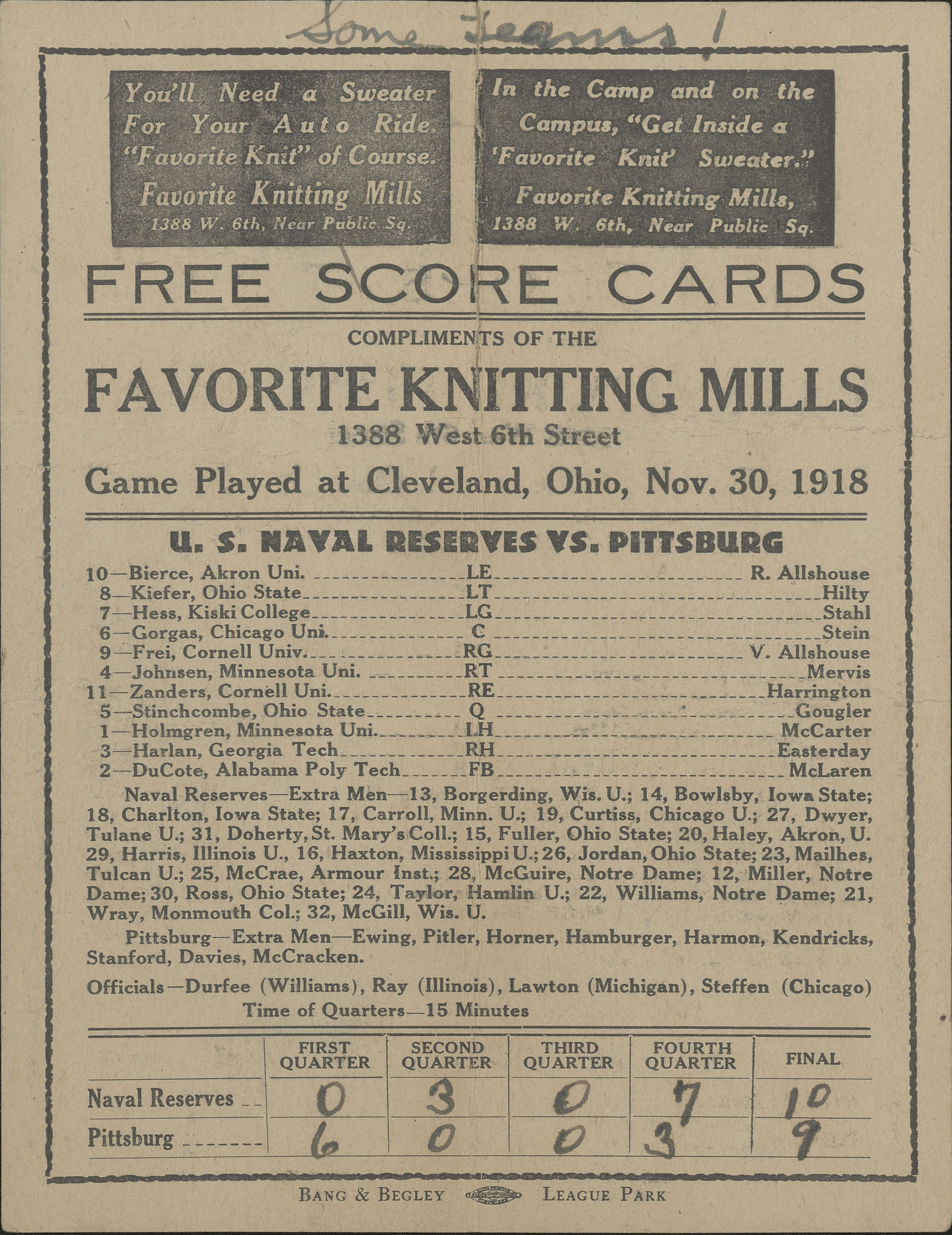
Scorecard for the 1918 Cleveland Naval Reserve vs. Pitt game

The Pitt Panthers opted to play a postseason game against the Cleveland Naval Reserve team two days after their annual battle with Penn State. The Naval Reserves were coached by former Penn State assistant Xen C. Scott and had a respectable 4–1 record against other military teams.

The final game of the season at Cleveland Naval Reserve resulted in "Pop" Warner's first loss at Pitt and is one of the most controversial in school history. Warner, along with some reporters covering the game, insisted Pitt was robbed by the officials who, claiming the official timekeeper's watch was broken, arbitrarily ended the first half before Pitt was able to score and then allowed the Reserves extra time in the fourth quarter to pull ahead 10–9 before calling an end to the game.

Coach Warner was livid: "We were robbed outright, and that is all there is to it. I can take a beating when it is fairly administered, as well as anyone, but I never liked to be cheated, and Pitt was certainly cheated at Cleveland. There was no attempt at fairness on the part of the officials. We hadn't a chance in the world." Thirty years later, Oct. 2, 1948, a seventy-seven year old Warner returned to Pitt as guest of honor for the Pitt versus Notre Dame football game. Al Abrams of the Post-Gazette reminisced with Warner and recalled how he had come to Pitt and led the Panthers to four unbeaten campaigns. Warner corrected him "No, we lost one," he recalls with a grim laugh. "We got rooked out of a victory in a postseason game with Great Lakes one of those years. That was the rawest bit of officiating I ever saw."

Robert W. “Tiny” Maxwell, football official and sports editor of the Philadelphia Evening Ledger, did not witness the game but was concerned about the controversy and gathered partisan reports:

“There always are two sides to a story, and Cleveland now comes to bat with a yarn of its own regarding the Naval Reserve – Pitt football upset of last Saturday. According to Jim Lanyon, sports editor of the Plain Dealer, who is known throughout the land as a fair and competent critic, Pitt was not handed the worst of it, so far as he could see, but was beaten by a better team. 'Not only myself, but experts like Xen Scott and Henry Edwards also declare that Pitt has no kick to make over the game last Saturday,' wires Lanyon. 'Pitt was treated fairly and squarely and that's all there is to it.' I still maintain that Pittsburgh went into the game entirely too confident and beat themselves. The team is too good and too well coached to be beaten by any service or college team in the country if conditions are normal.”

Judy Harlan, formerly of Georgia Tech, and Moon Ducote, formerly of Auburn starred for the Cleveland Naval Reserves. Ducote kicked the winning field goal. Warner declared him "the greatest football player I ever saw". Harlan stated: "I intercepted a pass and returned it to midfield in the fourth quarter. I felt I at least had evened up some of the losses we had at Tech."

The Pitt lineup for the game against the Naval Reserves was Harry McCarter (left end), Leonard Hilty (left tackle), Edward Stahl (left guard) Herb Stein (center), Vance Allshouse (right guard), Lou Mervis (right tackle), William Harrington (right end), Roscoe Gougler (quarterback), Tom Davies (left halfback), Roy Easterday (right halfback) and George McLaren (fullback). Substitutes appearing in the game for Pitt were Harvey Harman and David Pitler. The game was played in 15-minute quarters.

== Scoring summary ==
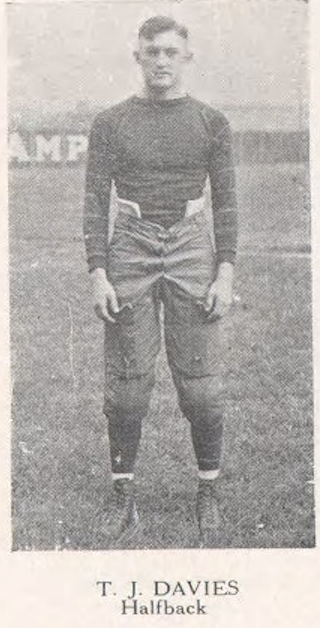
Tom Davies

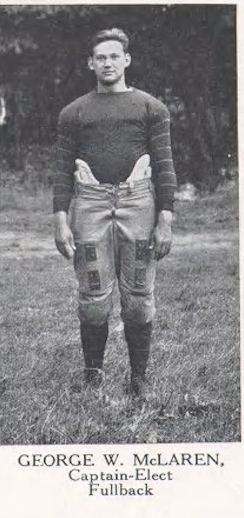
George McLaren

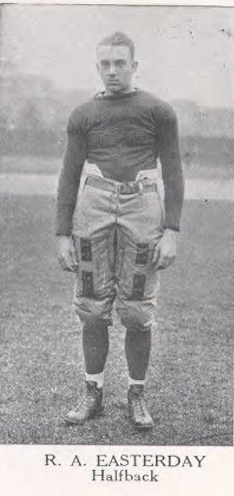
Roy Easterday

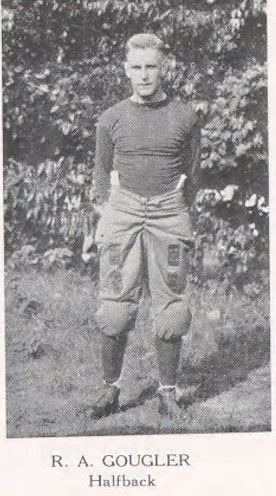
Roscoe Gougler

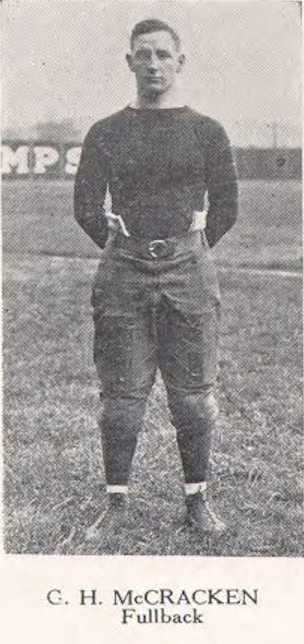
Herb McCracken

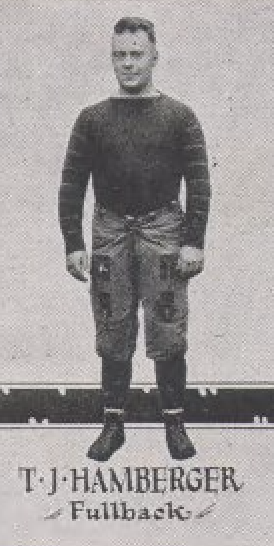
T. J. Hamberger

1918 Pittsburgh Panthers scoring summary
Player	Touchdowns	Extra points	Field goals	Safety	Points
Tom Davies	5	10	1	0	43
George McClaren	7	0	0	0	42
Roy Easterday	5	0	0	0	30
Roscoe Gougler	1	4	1	0	13
Herb McCracken	1	0	0	0	6
T. J. Hamberger	1	0	0	0	6
Totals	20	14	2	0	140

== Postseason ==
Despite the loss, the 4–1 Panthers of 1918 were named as a national champion for that season by multiple selectors, several of which are considered to be "major" selections by the official NCAA records book.

The following players received their letter: Captain George McLaren, Harry McCarter, Edward Stahl, Herb Stein, Vance Allshouse, Lou Mervis, William Harrington, Roscoe Gougler, Tom Davies, Roy Easterday, Leonard Hilty, William Horner, Ray Allshouse, David Pitler, Thomas Kendrick, Leland Stanford, Herb McCracken, Clyde Mitchell, Harvey Harman plus student manager Fred. E. Finley.

Karl E. Davis returned from Camp Joseph E. Johnston, where he was in the Officer's Training School for Quartermaster's service, to his position as Graduate Manager of Athletics.

=== List of national championship selectors ===
The 1918 team was selected or recognized as national champions by multiple selectors, several of which are listed as "major" (i.e. national in scope) by the official NCAA football records book. College Football Data Warehouse also recognizes Pitt as a national champion in 1918. Among the eight teams that all selectors chose retrospectively as national champions for 1918, these selectors determined Pitt to be national champions.

- 1st-N-Goal
- Alexander Weyand
- Angelo Louisa
- Bill Libby
- Bob Kirlin
- Bob Royce
- Century Football Index
- College Football USA
- George Trevor
- Harry Frye
- Helms Athletic Foundation*
- Houlgate System*
- James Whalen
- Jim Koger
- Loren Maxwell
- National Championship Foundation* (co-champions)
- Nutshell Sports Football Ratings
- Patrick Premo

* A "major" selector that was "national in scope" according to the official NCAA football records book.

=== All-American selections ===
- **Tom Davies**, halfback (1st team Walter Camp; Frank Menke Syndicate, by Frank G. Menke; 1st team Robert "Tiny" Maxwell, of the Philadelphia Public Ledger)
- **Leonard Hilty**, tackle (1st team Walter Camp; 2nd team Tiny Maxwell)
- **George McLaren**, fullback (2nd team Walter Camp [hb]; Menke Syndicate; 1st team Tiny Maxwell)
- Katy Easterday, halfback (1st team Tiny Maxwell)
- Skip Gougler, halfback (2nd team Tiny Maxwell)
- William E. Harrington, end (2nd team Tiny Maxwell)
- Jake Stahl, guard (2nd team Walter Camp; 2nd team Tiny Maxwell)

*Bold - Consensus All-American

== Bibliography ==
- Powers, Francis J. (1969). Life Story of Glen S. (Pop) Warner, Gridiron's Greatest Strategist. Chicago, IL: The Athletic Institute.
