= Commodore Perry =

Commodore Perry may refer to:

- Commodore Matthew Perry (1794–1858), United States Navy officer
- Commodore Oliver Hazard Perry (1785–1819), United States Navy officer
- Commodore Perry Owens (1852–1919), American gunfighter
- USS Commodore Perry (1859), a United States Navy steamship
- Lyman Perry (1897–1975), United States Navy officer with rank of commodore and All-American football player
