= Jock Sutherland =

American football player and coach (1889–1948)

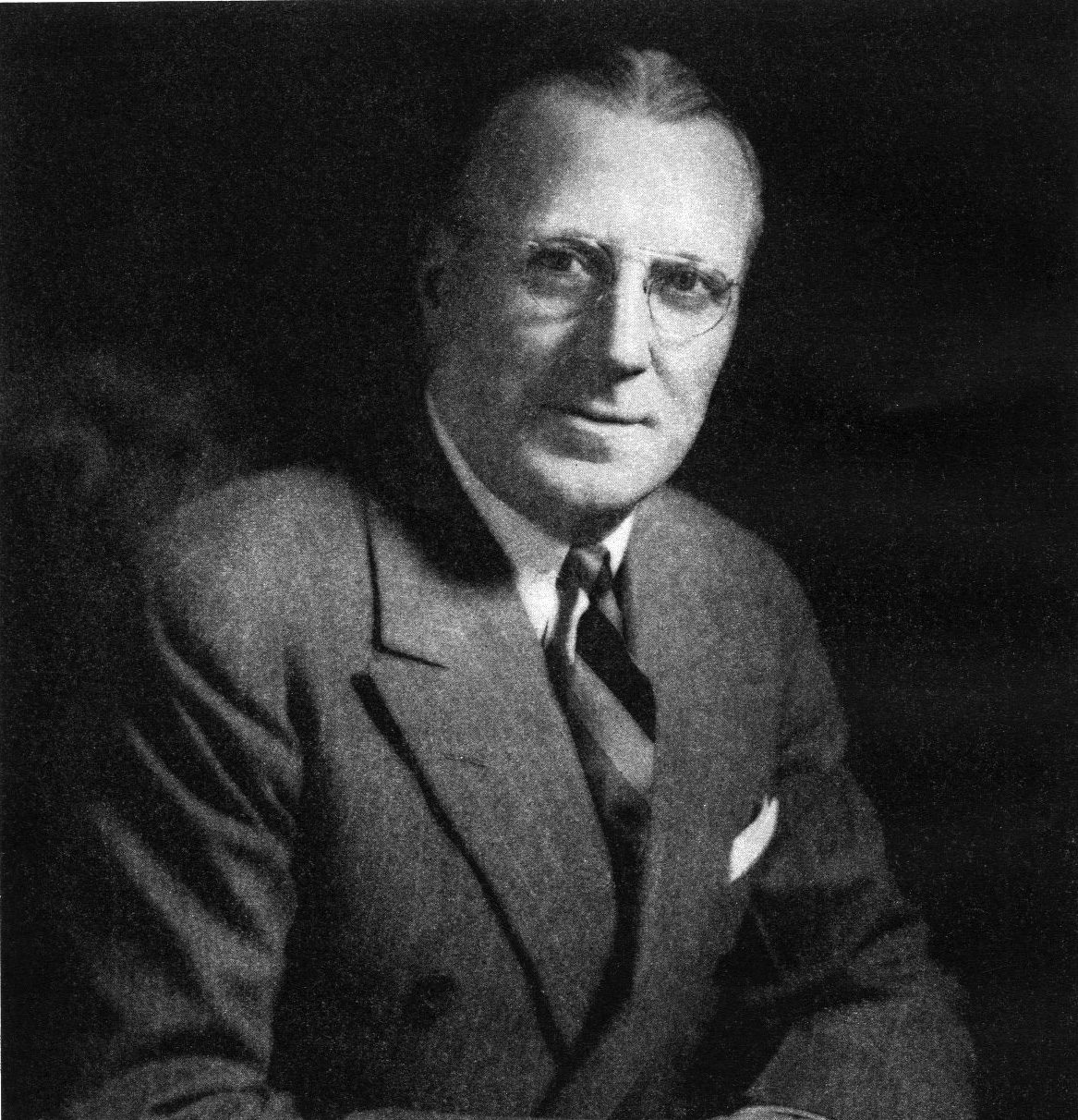
- Sutherland pictured in the 1939 Owl, Pitt's annual student yearbook

Profile
- Position: End

Personal information
- Born: March 21, 1889; Coupar Angus, Scotland
- Died: April 11, 1948 (aged 59); Pittsburgh, Pennsylvania, U.S.

Career information
- College: Pittsburgh

Career history

Playing
- Pittsburgh (1915–1917); Massillon Tigers (1919)

Coaching
- Lafayette (1919–1923); Pittsburgh (1924–1938); Brooklyn Dodgers (1940–1941); Pittsburgh Steelers (1946–1947)

Operations
- Pittsburgh Steelers (1946–1947)

Awards and highlights
- Consensus All-American (1917); Career coaching record: 144–28–14 (NCAA) 28–16–1 (NFL); Career bowl game record: 1–3; Meritorious Service Medal of the State of Pennsylvania; 6× National champion (1921, 1929, 1931, 1934, 1936, 1937); 7× Eastern football champion (1925, 1927, 1929, 1931, 1934, 1936, 1937)
- Military career
- Allegiance: United States
- Branch: U.S. Navy
- Service years: 1941–46
- Rank: Lt. Commander
- Conflicts: World War II
- Coaching profile at Pro Football Reference
- College Football Hall of Fame

John Bain Sutherland (March 21, 1889 – April 11, 1948) was a Scottish-American football player and coach. He coached college football at Lafayette College (1919–1923) and the University of Pittsburgh (1924–1938) and professional football for the Brooklyn Dodgers (1940–1941) and Pittsburgh Steelers (1946–1947). He was inducted into the College Football Hall of Fame in 1951.

== Biography ==
A native of Coupar Angus in Scotland, Sutherland got his start in football by playing end at the University of Pittsburgh, commonly known as Pitt, under legendary coach Glenn Scobey "Pop" Warner. Sutherland was named an All-American and played on Pitt's national championship teams in 1915 and 1916.

Sutherland also played on Pitt's undefeated 1917 team. The 1917 team was known as "The Fighting Dentists" because on occasion every position was filled by dental students. The dental students on the 1917 team included Sutherland, Katy Easterday, Skip Gougler, "Tank" McLaren and "Jake" Stahl. Sutherland also lettered in wrestling and captained the track and field team at Pitt for which he specialized in the hammer throw, discus, and shot put. He was also a member of the Sigma Chi fraternity, Psi Omega national dental fraternity, Omicron Delta Kappa, and the Druids Society, a secret society at the university. Sutherland graduated from the University of Pittsburgh's School of Dentistry, where he also held a professorship in the instruction of bridge and crown.

=== Coaching ===
In 1919, Sutherland played in a few games with the Massillon Tigers of the Ohio League, which was the direct predecessor to the modern National Football League. However, he soon left the team and began his head coaching career at Lafayette College from 1919 to 1923, leading the Leopards to the 1921 Eastern Collegiate Championship.

==== University of Pittsburgh ====
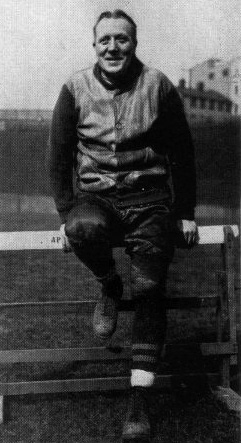
Sutherland in 1937

In 1924, Sutherland replaced "Pop" Warner, his former coach and mentor, as head coach at Pitt. Sutherland, who was described as "a national hero" in a Saturday Evening Post article, became a highly admired and influential coach at the university while compiling a record of 111–20–12. On offense, he ran a double-wing formation known as the "Sutherland Scythe". He was known for his calm and direct demeanor, never shouting or ranting to motivate his team.

During his tenure, Sutherland's teams were named Eastern football champions seven times including 1925, 1927, 1929, 1931, 1934, 1936, and 1937. During this time, Pitt appeared in four Rose Bowl games (1928, 1930, 1933, and 1937) and turned down a bid for the 1938 Rose Bowl. Sutherland's teams were named "National Champions" by various selectors for nine different seasons including 1925, 1927, 1929, 1931, 1933, 1934, 1936, 1937, and 1938. Of these, the University of Pittsburgh officially recognizes five of those years as national championship seasons (1929, 1931, 1934, 1936, and 1937), while one of them, 1937, includes the Associated Press national championship designation which, at the time, was only the second instance in which the AP poll had been published. Sutherland coached the famed "Dream Backfield" of John Chickerneo, Dick Cassiano, Harold Stebbins, and Marshall Goldberg, which at the time was considered to be the best backfield in history by some, including Don Miller, a member of The Four Horsemen of Notre Dame.

After years of struggling with the university for sustained financial support, Sutherland resigned in 1938 because the school's Chancellor, John Gabbert Bowman, instituted a policy of de-emphasis for the football program, eliminating athletic scholarships, student athlete stipends, and the recruiting funds. Bowman's moves, which resulted in Sutherland's departure, were controversial among students and supporters of the football program.

As of 2009, his career coaching record of 144–28–14 in 20 seasons at the collegiate level, an .812 winning percentage, is the 25th best winning percentage in all divisions of college football and 11th best among coaches from the top division, currently known as the Division I FBS. His .812 winning percentage is also the 5th best such mark during the first 20 years of any coaches' career. He is also tied for the 23rd fewest games to reach 100 victories, accomplished in his 132nd game as coach.

==== Professional football and military service ====
Sutherland later coached in the National Football League with the Brooklyn Dodgers for two seasons, 1940–41, before leaving the team to serve the United States during World War II.

During the war, Sutherland served in the United States Navy and achieved the rank of Lieutenant commander.

Upon returning to the United States, Sutherland landed with the Pittsburgh Steelers, where he was head coach and team vice president. He led the Steelers to their first playoff appearance in 1947.

=== Sudden illness and death ===
While on a scouting trip for the Steelers in April 1948, Sutherland was found in his car in Bandana, Kentucky, where he was experiencing confusion and was then taken to a hospital in Cairo, Illinois, where he was initially diagnosed with "nervous exhaustion". He was flown back to Pittsburgh for further treatment. An exploratory surgery was required to determine whether he was suffering from a hemorrhage or a tumor. Sutherland died in Pittsburgh on April 11, 1948, following surgery to remove a malignant brain tumor. He is interred in Pittsburgh's Homewood Cemetery.

== Honors ==
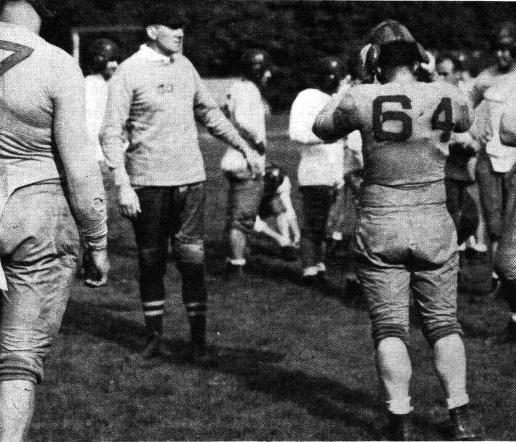
Sutherland running a practice at Pitt in 1935

Sutherland was inducted into the College Football Hall of Fame in 1951 as a coach. He is memorialized on the Pitt campus with a street, Sutherland Drive, and the student residence Sutherland Hall.

== Head coaching record ==
=== College ===
| Year | Team | Overall | Conference | Standing | Bowl/playoffs | AP^{#} |
|---|---|---|---|---|---|---|
Lafayette (Independent) (1919–1923)
| 1919 | Lafayette | 6–2 | | | | |
| 1920 | Lafayette | 5–3 | | | | |
| 1921 | Lafayette | 9–0 | | | | |
| 1922 | Lafayette | 7–2 | | | | |
| 1923 | Lafayette | 6–1–2 | | | | |
| Lafayette: | | 33–8–2 | | | | |
Pittsburgh Panthers (Independent) (1924–1938)
| 1924 | Pittsburgh | 5–3–1 | | | | |
| 1925 | Pittsburgh | 8–1 | | | | |
| 1926 | Pittsburgh | 5–2–2 | | | | |
| 1927 | Pittsburgh | 8–1–1 | | | L Rose | |
| 1928 | Pittsburgh | 6–2–1 | | | | |
| 1929 | Pittsburgh | 9–1 | | | L Rose | |
| 1930 | Pittsburgh | 6–2–1 | | | | |
| 1931 | Pittsburgh | 8–1 | | | | |
| 1932 | Pittsburgh | 8–1–2 | | | L Rose | |
| 1933 | Pittsburgh | 8–1 | | | | |
| 1934 | Pittsburgh | 8–1 | | | | |
| 1935 | Pittsburgh | 7–1–2 | | | | |
| 1936 | Pittsburgh | 8–1–1 | | | W Rose | 3 |
| 1937 | Pittsburgh | 9–0–1 | | | | 1 |
| 1938 | Pittsburgh | 8–2 | | | | 8 |
| Pittsburgh: | | 111–20–12 | | | | |
| Total: | | 144–28–14 | | | | |
National championship Conference title Conference division title or championship game berth
^{#}Rankings from final AP Poll.

*The Pittsburgh Panthers claim a share of the 1934 national championship per a 1970 Sports Illustrated study on national championships that the school has used since its publication as the basis of its claims. However, this championship is not included in the Official NCAA Records Book's list of national champions.
