= Skip Gougler =

American football player and coach (1894–1962)

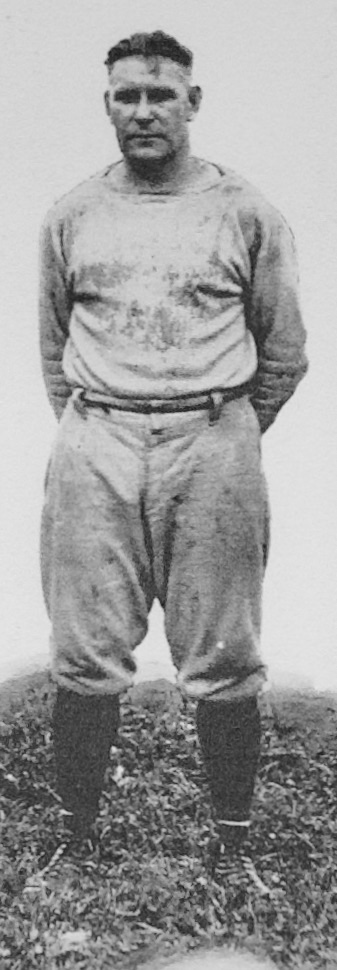

Profile
- Positions: Halfback, quarterback

Personal information
- Born: August 11, 1894; Harrisburg, Pennsylvania, U.S.
- Died: July 16, 1962 (aged 67); Pittsburgh, Pennsylvania, U.S.

Career information
- College: Pittsburgh

Career history

Playing
- 1919: Massillon Tigers

Coaching
- 1920: Duquesne (assistant)
- 1921–1923: Lafayette (assistant)
- 1924–1934: Pittsburgh (assistant)

Awards and highlights
- 3× National champion (1915, 1916, 1918); Second-team All-American Philadelphia Inquirer (1918)

Roscoe A. "Skip" Gougler (August 11, 1894 – July 16, 1962) was an American football player and coach, dentist, and professor of dentistry. He played at the halfback and quarterback positions for the Pittsburgh Panthers football teams from 1914 to 1918. He was selected as a second-team All-American in 1918. He also played two years of professional football, including the 1919 season with the Massillon Tigers of the Ohio League. He later coached football and became a member of the faculty at the University of Pittsburgh's dentistry school.

== Biography ==
Gougler was raised in Harrisburg, Pennsylvania. He played quarterback for the Harrisburg Central High School football team, where he developed a reputation as "a most illusive [sic] sidestepper."

After one year at Conway Hall, Gougler enrolled at the University of Pittsburgh where he played four years of football under coach "Pop" Warner. Gougler was a member of the Pitt Panthers football teams from 1915-1918. He played halfback and quarterback at Pitt. During Gougler's four seasons at Pitt, the Panthers were undefeated and ran up a 33-game winning streak before losing to Syracuse by a score of 24-3 in 1919. As a senior in 1918, Gougler was selected as a second-team All-American by Robert (Tiny) Maxwell, sports editor of the Philadelphia Inquirer.

Pitt's undefeated 1917 team was known as "The Fighting Dentists" because on occasion every position was filled by dental students. The dental students on the 1917 team included Gougler, "Tank" McLaren Katy Easterday, "Jake" Stahl. and Jock Sutherland.

Gougler signed with the Massillon Tigers to play professional football in 1919. Gougler proved to be a key player on the 1919 Massillon team. Early in the season, Gougler kicked three field goals to account for all of the team's scoring in a key 9-6 win over the Akron Indians. Gougler's third field goal came with only seconds left in the game. In a rematch against Akron later in the year, Gougler again scored all of Massillon's points in a 13-6 win. On Armistice Day in 1919, Massillon lost to Cleveland Tigers, 3-0, as Gougler missed five field goal attempts, including three from inside the 20-yard line.

In 1920, Gougler completed his education in dentistry. While completing his studies, he began his coaching career as an assistant coach at Duquesne University in Pittsburgh. In July 1921, he was hired as an assistant football coach at Lafayette College in Easton, Pennsylvania. At Lafayette, Gougler worked as an assistant to his former Pitt teammate Jock Sutherland. In 1924, Sutherland became the head football coach at Pitt, and Gougler followed him from Lafayette. Gougler again became an assistant football coach under Sutherland. He remained a member of the Pitt coaching staff until 1934.

Gougler later served as a member of Pitt's Dental School faculty.

Gougler died at Shadyside Hospital in Pittsburgh at age 67 in 1962.
