= 1918 All-America college football team =

Official list of the best college football players of 1918

The 1918 All-America college football team consists of American football players selected to the All-America college football teams selected by various organizations for the 1918 college football season.

== All-Americans of 1918 ==
=== Ends ===
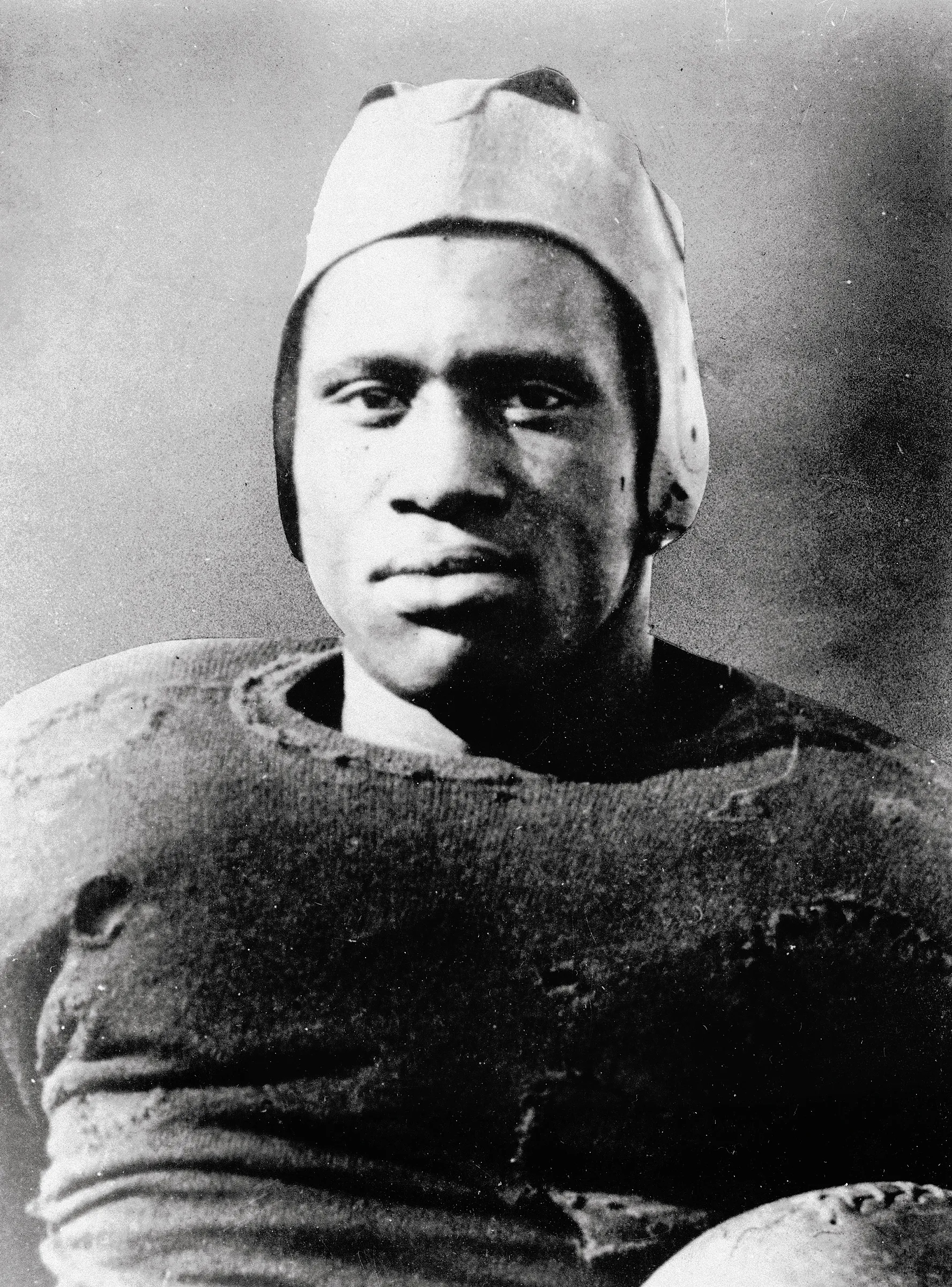
Paul Robeson.

- **Paul Robeson**, Rutgers (WC-1; MS; TM-1)
- **Bill Fincher**, Georgia Tech (MS; TM-1, WC-2)
- Robert Hopper, Penn (WC-1; MS; TM-2)
- William E. Harrington, Pittsburgh (TM-2)
- Josh Weeks, Brown (WC-2)
- Joe Schwarzer, Syracuse (WC-3)
- John Tressel, Washington & Jefferson (WC-3)

=== Tackles ===
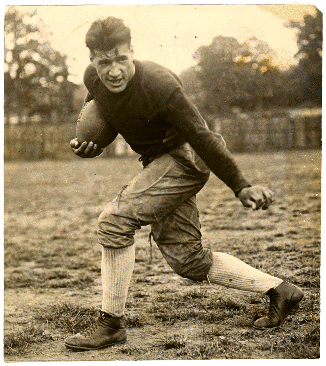
Joe Guyon.

- **Pete Henry**, Washington & Jefferson (College and Pro Football Hall of Fame) (WC-2; MS; TM-1)
- **Leonard Hilty**, Pittsburgh (WC-1; TM-2)
- **Lou Usher**, Syracuse (WC-1; TM-2)
- **Joe Guyon**, Georgia Tech (MS)
- Pard Larkin, Swarthmore (TM-1)
- John Ripple, North Carolina A&M (WC-2)
- Angus Goetz, Michigan (WC-3)
- James Neylon, Penn (WC-3)

=== Guards ===
- **Doc Alexander**, Syracuse (College Football Hall of Fame) (WC-1; MS; TM-1)
- **Lyman Perry**, Navy (WC-1; MS; TM-1)
- Jake Stahl, Pittsburgh (WC-2; TM-2)
- Alfred Neuschaefer, Rutgers (TM-2)
- Tommy Scaffe, Navy (WC-2)
- Fred Huggins, Brown (WC-3)
- Walter A. Gordon, California (WC-3)

=== Centers ===
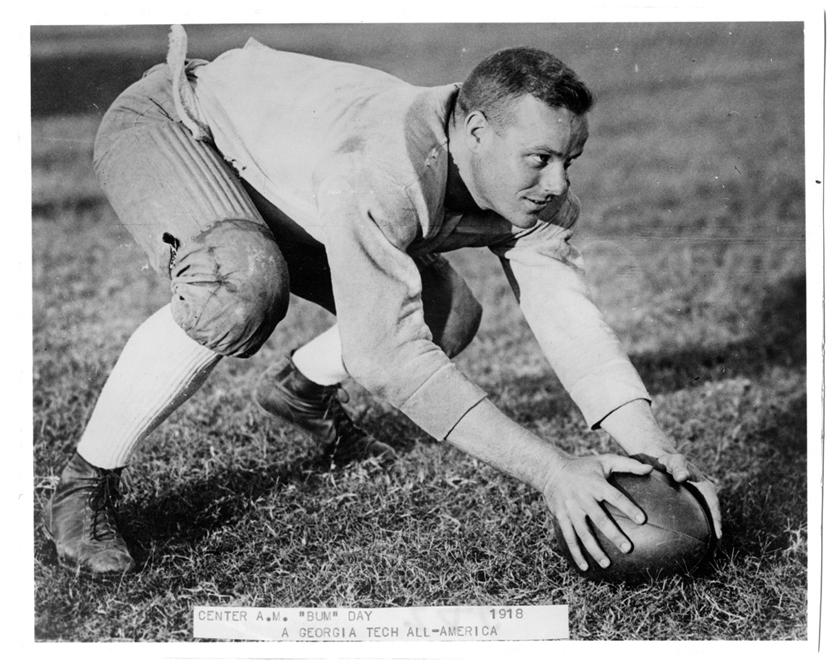
Bum Day.

- **Bum Day**, Georgia Tech (WC-1)
- **Jack Depler**, Illinois (WC-2; MS)
- Thomas Sterck, Washington & Jefferson (TM-1)
- Sam Arthur, Navy (TM-2)
- Tim Callahan, Princeton (WC-3)

=== Quarterbacks ===
- **Frank Murrey**, Princeton (WC-1; MS)
- Willard Ackley, Syracuse (WC-3; TM-1)
- Bill Ingram, Navy (TM-2)
- Robb, California (WC-2)

=== Halfbacks ===
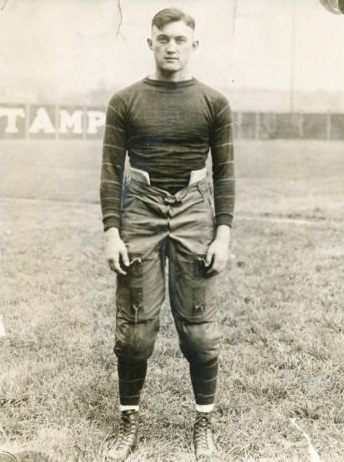
Tom Davies.

- **Tom Davies**, Pittsburgh (WC-1; MS; TM-1)
- **Wolcott Roberts**, Navy (WC-1; MS)
- Katy Easterday, Pittsburgh (TM-1)
- Buck Flowers, Georgia Tech (WC-2 [fb]; TM-2)
- Skip Gougler, Pittsburgh (TM-2)
- Frankie Frisch, Fordham (WC-2)
- Gus Eckberg, Minnesota (WC-3)
- Frank Kelley, Rutgers (WC-3)

=== Fullbacks ===
- Frank Steketee, Michigan (WC-1; TM-2)
- **George McLaren**, Pittsburgh (WC-2 [hb]; MS; TM-1)
- William Butler, Navy (WC-3)

=== Key ===
NCAA recognized selectors for 1918

- WC = Walter Camp for Collier's: The National Weekly
- MS = Frank Menke Syndicate, by Frank G. Menke

Other selectors

- TM = Robert "Tiny" Maxwell, of the Philadelphia Public Ledger

Bold = Consensus All-American

- 1 – First-team selection
- 2 – Second-team selection
- 3 – Third-team selection

== See also ==
- 1918 All-Big Ten Conference football team
- 1918 All-Pacific Coast football team
