= Jake Stahl (American football) =

American football player and coach (1891–1966)

Profile
- Positions: Guard, tackle

Personal information
- Born: January 16, 1891; Scranton, Pennsylvania, U.S.
- Died: October 8, 1966 (aged 75); Pittsburgh, Pennsylvania, U.S.
- Listed height: 5 ft 11 in (1.80 m)
- Listed weight: 185 lb (84 kg)

Career information
- High school: Greensburg, Salem (Greensburg, Pennsylvania) Bellefonte Academy (Bellefonte, Pennsylvania)
- College: Pittsburgh

Career history

Playing
- Cleveland Tigers (1920–1921); Dayton Triangles (1921)

Coaching
- Duquesne (1920–1921) Head coach

Awards and highlights
- National champion (1918); Second-team All-American (1918)

Edward Adam "Jake" Stahl (January 16, 1891 – October 8, 1966) was an American football player and coach. He played guard and tackle positions for the Pittsburgh Panthers football teams from 1915 to 1918. He was selected as a second-team All-American in 1918. He also played professional football from 1920 to 1921. Stahl served as the head football coach at Duquesne University from 1920 to 1921, compiling a record of 3–7–2.

== Biography ==
Stahl was born in Scranton, Pennsylvania. He played high school football in Greensburg, Pennsylvania, and at Bellefonte Academy in Bellefonte, Pennsylvania.

Stahl enrolled at the University of Pittsburgh, where he played four years of football under coach Pop Warner. Stahl was a member of the Pittsburgh Panthers football teams from 1915 to 1918. During Stahl's time at Pitt, the Panthers were undefeated and ran up a 33-game winning streak before losing to Syracuseby a score of 24–3 in 1919.

Pitt's undefeated 1917 team was known as "The Fighting Dentists" because on occasion every position was filled by dental students. The dental students on the 1917 team included Stahl, Katy Easterday, Skip Gougler, "Tank" McLaren, and Jock Sutherland.

In 1918, Stahl was selected as a second-team All-American by Walter Camp and Robert "Tiny" Maxwell.

After graduating from Pitt, Stahl played professional football for the Cleveland Tigers (1920–1921) and the Dayton Triangles (1921) of the American Professional Football Association (APFA)—now known as the National Football League (NFL).

After retiring as a player, Stahl became the head football coach at Duquesne University in Pittsburgh. In 1922, The New York Times reported that Stahl "has had charge of the Duquesne University teams here for the last two seasons with satisfactory results." Stahl's Duquesne Dukes teams compiled records of 3–3–1 in 1920 and 0–4–1 in 1921.

After retiring from coaching, Stahl practiced dentistry in Hampton, Pennsylvania. He also officiated at high school and college football games for 40 years and was a member of the Eastern Intercollegiate Football Officials Association. Stahl was also a member or the Elks and the Butler Country Club.

Stahl died in October 1966 at Allegheny General Hospital in Pittsburgh. He was survived by two brothers and was buried at St. Mary Cemetery in Hampton, Pennsylvania.

== Head coaching record ==
Year	Team	Overall	Conference	Standing	Bowl/playoffs
Duquesne Dukes (Independent) (1920–1921)
1920	Duquesne	3–3–1			
1921	Duquesne	0–4–1			
Duquesne:		3–7–2			
Total:		3–7–2			
