= Thomas Sterck =

American football player (1900–1970)

Thomas Richard Sterck
Washington & Jefferson Presidents
- Position: Center

Personal information
- Born: June 20, 1900
- Died: September 1970 (age 70)

Career information
- College: Washington & Jefferson (1918–1920)

Awards and highlights
- All-American (1918)

Thomas Richard Sterck (June 20, 1900 – September 1970) was an American football player.

Sterck was born in 1900 and attended Peabody High School in Pittsburgh. He was a star athlete at Peabody, participating in football and track. He set the school record in the discus.

At age 18, and with World War I underway, Sterck joined the students' army and was assigned to Washington & Jefferson College. At Washington & Jefferson, he played at the center position, and was also tried as a guard, on the 1918 Washington & Jefferson Red and Black football team. At the end of the 1918 season, he was selected by Tiny Maxwell as a first-team center on his 1918 College Football All-America Team.

Sterck missed the 1919 football season with a broken leg. He returned to the football team in 1920 and also played on the Washington & Jefferson basketball team.

Sterck later worked in the advertising business.
