= Leonard Hilty =

American football player (1896–1978)

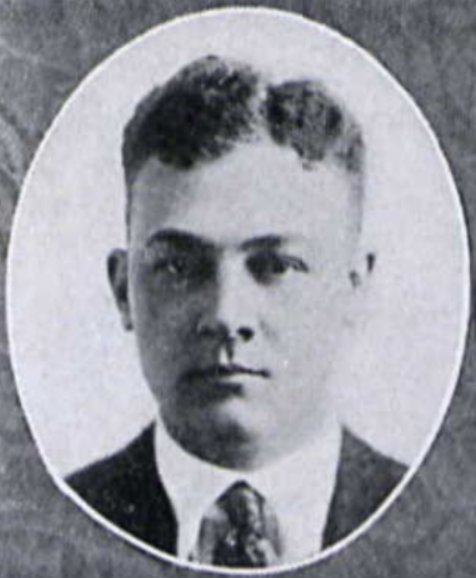
- Hilty from The Owl (1918)

Pittsburgh Panthers
- Position: Tackle

Personal information
- Born: September 5, 1896; Pittsburgh, Pennsylvania, U.S.
- Died: January 9, 1978 (aged 81); Brenham, Texas, U.S.

Career information
- High school: Peabody
- College: Pitt (1918)

Awards and highlights
- National champion (1918); Consensus All-American (1918)

Leonard Franklin Hilty (September 5, 1896 – January 9, 1978) was an American football player. He played college football for the University of Pittsburgh and was a consensus selection at the tackle position on the 1918 College Football All-America Team.

Hilty was raised in Pittsburgh, Pennsylvania, and attended Peabody High School. He enrolled at the University of Pittsburgh where he was a member of the Sigma Alpha Epsilon fraternity. He was also a member of the Pittsburgh Panthers football team and was selected as a consensus first-team All-American in 1918.

After graduating from Pitt, Hilty moved to Houston, Texas, by 1920. He lived there with his wife, a Texas native, and their two children. He was employed for many years as a salesman for a paper company, L.S. Bosworth Co. Hilty died in 1978 at Brenham, Texas, at age 81.
