= Tom Davies (American football) =

American football player and coach (1896–1972)

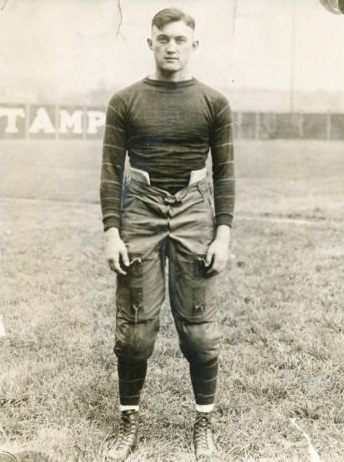
- Davies in 1921

Biographical details
- Born: October 14, 1896; Pittsburgh, Pennsylvania, U.S.
- Died: February 29, 1972 (aged 75); Pittsburgh, Pennsylvania, U.S.

Playing career
- 1918–1921: Pittsburgh
- Position: Halfback

Coaching career (HC unless noted)
- 1922: Penn (assistant)
- 1923: Geneva
- 1924–1925: Allegheny
- 1926–1934: Rochester (NY)
- 1935: Carnegie Tech (freshmen)
- 1936: Kiski Prep (PA)
- 1937–1939: St. Thomas/Scranton
- 1941–1947: Western Reserve

Head coaching record
- Overall: 96–52–11 (college)

Accomplishments and honors

Championships
- National (1918)

Awards
- Consensus All-American (1918); 2× First-team All-American (1920, 1921)
- College Football Hall of Fame; Inducted in 1970 (profile)

Thomas J. Davies (October 14, 1896 – February 29, 1972) was an American football player and coach. He played as a halfback at the University of Pittsburgh and was a consensus All-American in 1918 and 1920. After retiring as a player, Davies worked as a football coach for the next 26 years, including stints at the University of Pennsylvania, Geneva College, Allegheny College, the University of Rochester, the Carnegie Institute of Technology, the University of Scranton, and Western Reserve University. He was inducted into the College Football Hall of Fame as a player in 1970.

== Playing career ==
Davies was a native of Gas City, Indiana. He moved to Washington, Pennsylvania when he was 11 years old. Davies played high school football at Aliquippa High School in Aliquippa, Pennsylvania, and at The Kiski School in Saltsburg, Pennsylvania. Davies was working in a Washington factory when he got the chance to play football at Kiski. A friend refused to accept a football scholarship there unless Davies went along.

Davies enrolled at the University of Pittsburgh where he played four seasons (1918–1921) of football under coach Glenn Scobey "Pop" Warner. Davies played in 31 games for the Pittsburgh Panthers and averaged 150 yards per game over his four-year career. He was selected as a first-team All-American in his freshman season of 1918 and again as a junior in 1920. As a freshman in 1918, Davies weighed only 142 pounds. In his first carry for Pitt, he ran for 13 yards against Washington & Jefferson—then a national power. Three plays later, he ran for 38 yards, "setting the pace for a stellar playing career."

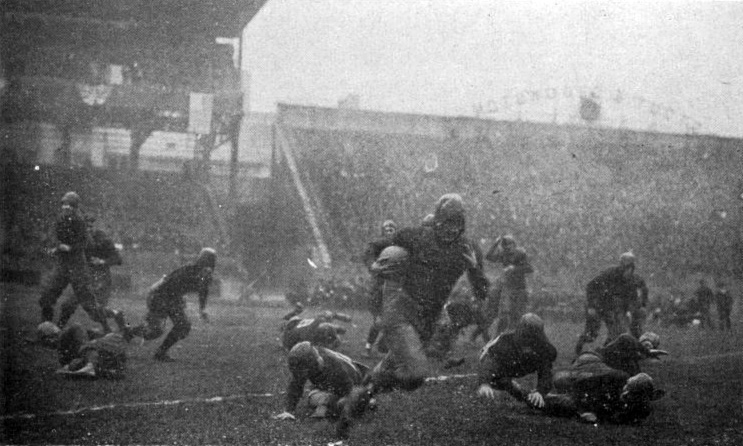
Pitt's Tommy Davies runs against undefeated and unscored upon Georgia Tech in a 1918 game at Forbes Field. Pitt won the game 32–0 and is considered by many to be that season's national champion.

Davies helped Pitt to an undefeated season and a national championship in 1918, as he led the team in rushing, passing and receiving. He led Pitt in all-purpose yards all four years that he played. In a 1918 game against Georgia Tech, the freshman Davies accounted for five touchdowns—running 50 yards for a touchdown, returning two punts for touchdowns (a 60-yard and a 50-yard return), and passing for two more touchdowns. After watching Davies run back a kickoff 90 yards for a touchdown in 1918, one writer noted:

"When Brother Tom Davies caught the kickoff on the ten-yard line at Franklin Field in Philadelphia one Saturday in November, we saw the prettiest piece of open field work not off at an angle, Tommie ran the length since the days of Jim Thorpe. On a bee line of the gridiron, and in so doing he personally took care of seven men! Then just for fun he added two more. The papers said, 'Tom Davies Beats Penn.' It has been the same against Syracuse, Lafayette and Georgia Tech. And now Pitt is counting on another All-American."

As a junior in 1920, Davies led Pitt to another big win over the University of Pennsylvania. In what some called Davies' finest game, he threw a touchdown pass, ran 80 yards for a touchdown, returned a kickoff 90 yards for a touchdown and returned an interception 60 yards for a touchdown. Also in 1920, he led Pitt to a 35–0 win over Syracuse, as he rushed for 255 yards and scored 16 points in only three quarters of play. In December 1920, Davies was elected by his teammates to be captain of Pitt's 1921 football team. Davies was selected as team captain at a team banquet at which the entire team gave Davies "a thunderous cheer." The Cleveland Plain Dealer reported that Davies was so affected by the demonstration that he stammered only a few words of appreciation and left the hall saying, "I'm going to phone my mother and tell her all about it."

Davies continues to rank among Pitt's all-time leaders in scoring with 181 points and all-purpose yards with 3,931 yards. He was survived by his wife and two daughters.

== Coaching career ==
After graduating from Pitt, Davies began a long career as a college football coach. His first coaching position was as an assistant to the legendary John Heisman at the University of Pennsylvania in 1922. At the time of his hiring at Penn, The New York Times noted: "Tom Davies, former Pitt captain and all-American halfback, makes his debut as a Penn coach. The versatile Davies, who raised havoc with a number of Penn elevens in recent years, will instruct in forward passing, punting and straight arming, and will also help Tom McNamara with the scrubs."

Davies received his first head coaching job in 1923 when he was hired as the head football coach for the Geneva College Golden Tornadoes located in Beaver Falls, Pennsylvania. He spent only one season at Geneva, compiling a record of 6–2–1. In 1924, he was hired by Allegheny College where he remained for two seasons. In 1926, Davies was hired as the head football coach at the University of Rochester, where he spent nine years, coaching until 1934. After leaving Rochester, he spent one season as a coach at Carnegie Tech and another at Kiski Prep School.

In 1937, Davies took over as head football coach at St. Thomas College. In his first season, he led the Tomcats to a 6–1–1 record. Prior to the start of the 1938 season, St. Thomas College changed its name to the University of Scranton. Davies's 1938 team finished with a record of 7–2. The team improved in 1939 and completed an undefeated 7–0–2 season. Davies resigned as Scranton's coach in March 1940 with a three-year record of 20–3–3.

After leaving Scranton, Davies went into the insurance business in the Cleveland area.

Although Davies insisted at the time of his resignation at Scranton that he was done with coaching, he was hired in March 1941 to take over as the head football coach for the Western Reserve University Red Cats. Davies served seven years as head coach at Western Reserve, although there was no team from 1943 to 1945 due to World War II, but was discharged in October 1947 by the University Board of Athletics. The dismissal came 24 hours after members of the team demanded that they finish the year under another coach.

== Later years ==
After permanently retiring from football in 1947, Davies returned to the insurance business in the Pittsburgh area.

Davies was inducted into the Pennsylvania Sports Hall of Fame in 1966 and the College Football Hall of Fame in 1970. He died of a heart attack in February 1972 at age 75. He died at his home in Pittsburgh's Highland Park district.

== Head coaching record ==
=== College ===
Year	Team	Overall	Conference	Standing	Bowl/playoffs
Geneva Covenanters (Independent) (1923)
1923	Geneva	6–2–1			
Geneva:		6–2–1			
Allegheny Gators (Independent) (1924–1925)
1924	Allegheny	5–2			
1925	Allegheny	5–3			
Allegheny:		10–5			
Rochester Yellowjackets (New York State Conference) (1926–1934)
1926	Rochester	3–5–1	2–2–1	T–5th	
1927	Rochester	6–2			
1928	Rochester	5–2–1	3–0–1	2nd	
1929	Rochester	6–2–1			
1930	Rochester	7–2			
1931	Rochester	3–5–1			
1932	Rochester	4–5			
1933	Rochester	1–6–1			
1934	Rochester	5–2			
Rochester:		40–31–5			
St. Thomas Tommies / Scranton Tomcats (Independent) (1937–1939)
1937	St. Thomas	6–1–1			
1938	Scranton	7–2			
1939	Scranton	7–0–2			
St. Thomas / Scranton:		20–3–3			
Western Reserve Red Cats (Big Four Conference) (1941–1942)
1941	Western Reserve	7–1	3–0	1st	
1942	Western Reserve	8–3	3–0	1st	
Western Reserve Red Cats (Mid-American Conference) (1946–1947)
1946	Western Reserve	4–3–2	1–1	2nd	
1947	Western Reserve	1–4 (Note: Davies was fired after the fifth game of the season and replaced with Richard W. Luther.)	1–1		
Western Reserve:		20–11–2	8–2		
Total:		96–52–11			
National championship Conference title Conference division title or championship game berth
