= Katy Easterday =

American athlete, coach and dentist (1894–1976)

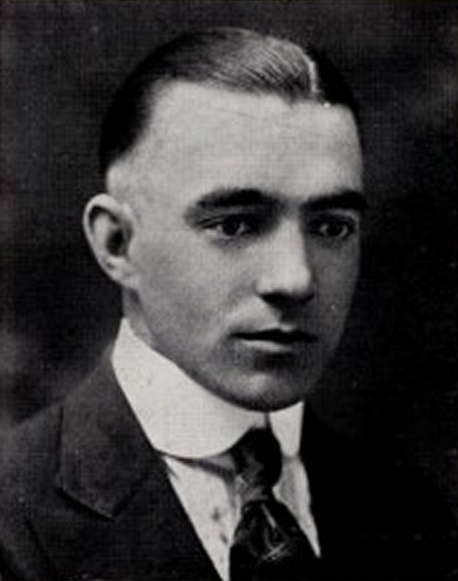
- Easterday pictured in The Bronco 1920, Simmons yearbook

Biographical details
- Born: June 29, 1894; Lisbon, Ohio, U.S.
- Died: May 26, 1976 (aged 81); Odessa, Texas, U.S.

Playing career

Football
- 1917–1918: Pittsburgh

Basketball
- 1916–1918: Pittsburgh
- Position: Halfback (football)

Coaching career (HC unless noted)

Football
- 1919–1920: Simmons (TX)
- 1921: Bethany (WV) (assistant)
- 1922–1923: Bethany (WV)
- 1925–1927: Waynesburg

Basketball
- 1920–1921: Simmons (TX)
- 1921–1924: Bethany (WV)
- 1924–1928: Waynesburg

Baseball
- 1920: Simmons (TX)

Administrative career (AD unless noted)
- 1919–1921: Simmons (TX)
- 1924–1928: Waynesburg

Head coaching record
- Overall: 25–29–8 (college football); 83–69 (college basketball); 13–7 (college baseball)

Accomplishments and honors

Awards
- All-American (1918)

Roy Alexander "Katy" Easterday (June 29, 1894 – May 26, 1976) was an American football and basketball player, track and field athlete, coach, college athletics administrator, and dentist. He played at the halfback position for the Pittsburgh Panthers football teams from 1917 to 1918 and was selected as an All-American in 1918. Easterday served as the head football coach at Simmons College (now known as Hardin–Simmons University) in Abilene, Texas from 1919 to 1920, Bethany College in Bethany, West Virginia from 1922 to 1923, and Waynesburg College (now known as Waynesburg University) in Waynesburg, Pennsylvania from 1925 to 1927, compiling a career college football head coaching record of 25–29–8.

== Early life and playing career ==
Easterday was born in Lisbon, Ohio. He was an all-state basketball player and held the state record in the pole vault. Before enrolling in college, Easterday also played on sandlot and hometown teams from Ambridge, Salem, Beaver Falls and other western Pennsylvania and eastern Ohio teams.

In 1913, Easterday enrolled at the University of Pittsburgh. When he announced that he wanted to play football for "Pop" Warner, his comments initially "invoked some chuckles from officials there." Easterday made the team as a halfback and scatback. He played on Pitt teams that ran up a 33-game winning streak before losing to Syracuse by a score of 24–3 in 1919. As a senior in 1918, Easterday was selected as a first-team All-American by Tom Thorpe, sports editor of The New York Times, and Robert "Tiny" Maxwell, sports editor of The Philadelphia Inquirer. Walter Camp praised Easterday as “one of the finest forward pass snaggers Camp had ever seen.”

Pitt's undefeated 1917 team was known as "The Fighting Dentists" because on occasion every position was filled by dental students. The dental students on the 1917 team included Easterday, Skip Gougler, "Tank" McLaren, "Jake" Stahl. and Jock Sutherland.

Easterday also ran track at Pitt and played for the university's basketball teams, serving as the team captain in 1917.

== Coaching career ==
Easterday graduated from Pitt in 1919 with a degree in dentistry. He passed his state dentistry examination but opted to pursue a career in coaching. After graduating, Easterday became the athletic director and head coach of all sports at Hardin–Simmons College, a private Baptist college in Abilene, Texas. In three years at Hardin–Simmons, Easterday coached two conference basketball championships and a conference baseball championship. He also coached three pitchers who went on to play Major League Baseball: Jesse "T-Bone" Winters, John "Lefty" Middleton, and Lefty Ward.

He also coached for four years each at Bethany College in Bethany, West Virginia. From 1924 to 1928, Easterday was the athletic director at Waynesburg College. Waynesburg later played in the first televised football game in 1939. He was inducted into Waynesburg's Yellow-Jacket Sports Hall of Fame in 1971. Easterday coached all sports at Waynesburg, including football, basketball and track in the mid-1920s.

From 1929 to 1933, Easterday coached football and basketball at Kittanning High School, located 44 miles (71 km) northeast of Pittsburgh. He coached the Kittanning Wildcats to their first undefeated, untied season in which they allowed only 12 points scored against them the entire year.

== Later life and family ==
Easterday also practiced as a dentist in Kittanning, Pennsylvania in the 1930s, and worked for a couple of years with the National Youth Association. From 1937 to 1942, he worked for Allegheny Ludlum Steel and from 1942 to 1959, Easterday was a safety supervisor at the Pullman-Standard Company in Butler, Pennsylvania. He was also one of the organizers of the Butler County Safety Council.

After retiring from Pullman-Standard, Easterday moved to Odessa, Texas. Easterday had begun his coaching career at Hardin-Simmons College near Odessa and met his wife there. In 1968, he was named "Elk of the Year" by the Elks lodge at Odessa. Easterday was married to Myrtle Christian, and the couple had a daughter.

== Head coaching record ==
=== College football ===
Year	Team	Overall	Conference	Standing	Bowl/playoffs
Simmons Cowboys (Independent) (1919–1920)
1919	Simmons	5–3			
1920	Simmons	2–6–1			
Simmons:		7–9–1			
Bethany Bison (Independent) (1922–1923)
1922	Bethany	8–2			
1923	Bethany	1–5–2			
Bethany:		9–7–2			
Waynesburg Yellow Jackets (Tri-State Conference) (1925–1927)
1925	Waynesburg	3–5–2	2–1–1	2nd	
1926	Waynesburg	5–3	3–2	3rd	
1927	Waynesburg	1–5–3	1–2–2	5th	
Waynesburg:		9–13–5	6–5–3		
Total:		25–29–8			
