= Lou Usher =

American football player (1897–1927)

Profile
- Positions: Tackle, guard, center

Personal information
- Born: June 27, 1897; Chicago, Illinois, U.S.
- Died: January 1, 1927 (aged 29) near Calumet City, Illinois, U.S.

Career information
- College: Syracuse

Career history
- 1920, 1921: Rochester Jeffersons
- 1921, 1923: Chicago Bears
- 1923, 1924, 1926: Hammond Pros
- 1924: Kenosha Maroons
- 1924: Milwaukee Badgers

Awards and highlights
- Consensus All-American (1918)

Louis Childs Usher (June 27, 1897 – January 1, 1927) was an American football player. He played professionally as tackle, guard, and center in the National Football League (NFL) for five seasons with the Rochester Jeffersons, Chicago Bears, Hammond Pros, Kenosha Maroons, and Milwaukee Badgers. Usher was killed on January 1, 1927, in an automobile accident near Calumet City, Illinois.
