= Sterky =

Sterky is a Swedish surname of Swiss origin that may refer to:

- Anna Sterky, a 19th-century Swedish Social Democrat and union organiser
- Fredrik Sterky, a 19th-century Swedish Social Democrat and union organiser

== See also ==
- Styrbjörn Sterki, Styrbjörn the Strong
- Victor Sterki
