= Lyman Perry =

American football player and naval officer (1897–1975)

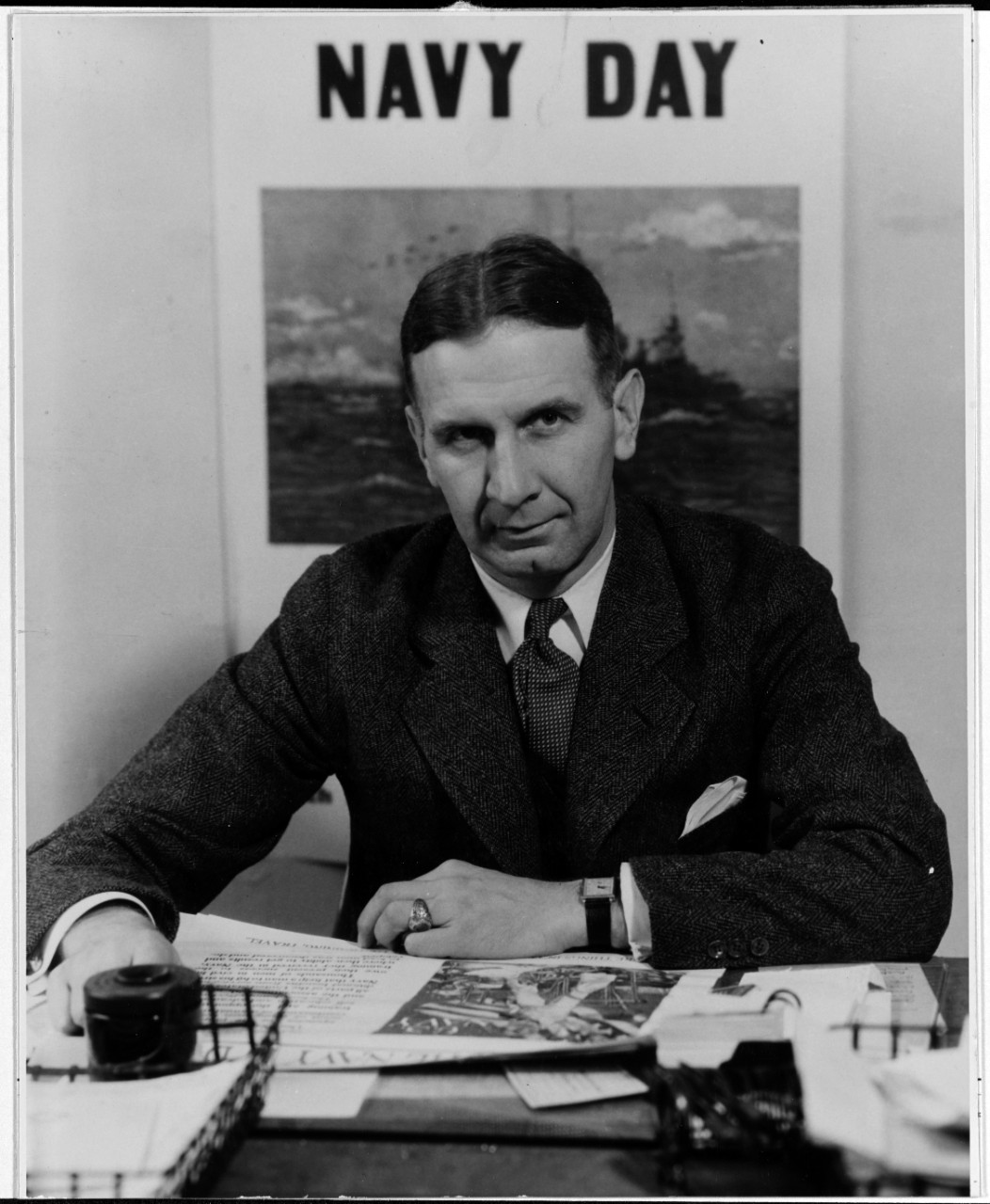
- A 1932 photograph taken in the Navy press room likely in the first half of the year while he was still assigned to the office of Chief of Naval Operations.

Profile
- Position: Guard

Personal information
- Born: March 10, 1897; Andover, Ohio, U.S.
- Died: June 2, 1975 (aged 78); Easton, Maryland, U.S.

Career information
- College: Navy (1918)

Awards and highlights
- Consensus All-American (1918)

Lyman Spencer "Pop" Perry (March 10, 1897 – June 2, 1975) was an American football player and naval officer. He played college football for the Navy Midshipmen football team of the United States Naval Academy. After the 1918 season, he was selected as a consensus first-team guard on the 1918 College Football All-America Team.

Perry served in the United States Navy from graduation until January 1946, attaining the rank of commodore. He was also served as athletic director at the Naval Academy from 1942 to 1943. He died in 1975 in Easton, Maryland. He was buried at the United States Naval Academy Cemetery in Annapolis.
