= George McLaren (American football) =

American athlete and coach (1896–1967)

Biographical details
- Born: August 29, 1896
- Died: November 13, 1967 (aged 71); Towson, Maryland, U.S.

Playing career

Football
- 1915–1918: Pittsburgh
- Position: Fullback

Coaching career (HC unless noted)

Football
- 1919: Kansas State Normal
- 1920–1921: Arkansas
- 1922–1926: Cincinnati
- 1927–1929: Wyoming

Basketball
- 1928–1930: Wyoming

Head coaching record
- Overall: 32–55–8 (football); 28–10 (basketball)

Accomplishments and honors

Awards
- Consensus All-American (1918); First-team All-American (1917)
- College Football Hall of Fame; Inducted in 1965 (profile)

George W. "Tank" McLaren (August 29, 1896 – November 13, 1967) was an American college football and college basketball player and coach. Playing at the University of Pittsburgh under legendary football coach Pop Warner, McLaren was an All-American in 1917 and 1918. During his playing career, he was never stopped for a loss on a running play. McLaren served as head football coach at Emporia State University, then known as Kansas State Normal College, (1919), the University of Arkansas (1920–1921), the University of Cincinnati (1922–1926), and the University of Wyoming (1927–1929), compiling a career college football head coaching record of 32–55–8. He also coached basketball at Wyoming for two seasons (1928–1930), tallying a mark of 28–10. McLaren was inducted into the College Football Hall of Fame as a player in 1965.

== Early life ==
McLaren grew up in Pittsburgh, where graduated from Peabody High School. He played football at Peabody and competed in several other sports including track, basketball, and swimming.

== University of Pittsburgh ==
McLaren attended the University of Pittsburgh, where he was considered one of the greatest all-around athletes that Pitt ever produced. In addition to being a football All-American, he was also a two-year member of the basketball and track teams. McLaren played four varsity seasons as fullback at Pittsburgh from 1915 to 1918. While playing for the Panthers he only lost one game while winning thirty decisions. He was a member of three national championship-winning teams under head coach Glenn "Pop" Warner. In 1916, the Panthers beat several national powers while not giving up a single point. During the next two seasons McLaren won All-America honors. In 1917 season, McLaren helped the Panthers to a 10–0 record. That season, he established single season school records when he scored 13 touchdowns and rushed for 782 yards including a then record 91-yard touchdown against Syracuse University.

Pitt's undefeated 1917 team was known as "The Fighting Dentists" because on occasion every position was filled by dental students. The dental students on the 1917 team included McLaren, Katy Easterday, Skip Gougler, "Jake" Stahl, and Jock Sutherland.

In 1918, his senior season, he served as Captain of the Panther football team and was also president of his senior class. He still ranks among the University of Pittsburgh all-time leaders in both scoring (183 points) and rushing (1,920 yards). One of McLaren's most noted achievements was that he was never stopped for a loss on a running play.

== College coach ==
McLaren was a college football coach from 1919 to 1929. In 1919, McLaren was named as head football coach at Emporia State University, then known as Kansas State Normal College, in Emporia, Kansas. He got the position based on a recommendation by Pop Warner. He coached at Kansas State Normal for just the 1919 season, leading his team to a record of 1–5–2. He next served as the head football coach at the University of Arkansas, where he compiled an 8–5–3 record. As Arkansas head football coach McLaren personally was a very popular coach but was let go because number of wins did not meet expectations. From 1922 to 1926, he coached at the University of Cincinnati, where he compiled a 16–26–3 record. From 1927 to 1929, he coached at the University of Wyoming, where he compiled a 7–19 record. His overall record as a college football coach was 32–55–8.

== After coaching ==
After his coaching career, McLaren worked in the industrial relations division of a company in Baltimore. He was inducted into the National Football Foundation's College Football Hall of Fame in 1965.

== Head coaching record ==
=== Football ===
Year	Team	Overall	Conference	Standing	Bowl/playoffs
Kansas State Normal Hornets (Independent) (1919)
1919	Kansas State Normal	1–5–2			
Kansas State Normal:		1–5–2			
Arkansas Razorbacks (Southwest Conference) (1920–1921)
1920	Arkansas	3–2–2	2–0–1	2nd	
1921	Arkansas	5–3–1	2–1	3rd	
Arkansas:		8–5–3	4–1–1		
Cincinnati Bearcats (Ohio Athletic Conference) (1922–1925)
1922	Cincinnati	1–7–1	1–3–1	13th	
1923	Cincinnati	6–3	5–2	T–4th	
1924	Cincinnati	2–6–1	1–4	T–17th	
1925	Cincinnati	4–5	2–3	14th	
Cincinnati Bearcats (Ohio Athletic Conference / Buckeye Athletic Association) (1926)
1926	Cincinnati	3–5–1	2–5–1 / 0–3–1	16th / 6th	
Cincinnati:		16–26–3	11–17–2		
Wyoming Cowboys (Rocky Mountain Conference) (1927–1929)
1927	Wyoming	4–5	1–4	10th	
1928	Wyoming	2–7	0–5	11th	
1929	Wyoming	1–7	0–7	12th	
Wyoming:		7–19	1–16		
Total:		32–55–8			
