= 1918 All-Service football team =

The 1918 All-Service football team consists of American football players of the United States military selected to the all-service football teams chosen by various selectors.

== All-Service players of 1918 ==
=== Ends ===
- Woodruff, Granite State (WC-1)
- Clarence Zimmerman, Washington State; Mare Island Marines (WC-1)
- Schroeder, Minnesota; Chicago Naval Reserves (WE-1)
- Klein, Illinois; Chicago Naval Reserves (WE-1)
- George Halas, Illinois; Great Lakes Navy (WC-2)
- Statz, Camp Slocum (WC-2)
- Jardine, Camp Dodge (WE-2)
- Mansfield, Camp Grant (WE-2)
- Chambers, Mather Field (WC-3)
- Dick Reichle, Illinois; Great Lakes Navy (WC-3)

=== Tackles ===
- Christian "Big Ben" Bentz, Montana; Chicago Naval Reserves (WC-1, WE-1)
- Hugh Blacklock, Michigan Agricultural; Great Lakes Navy (WC-1, WE-1)
- Conway, Newport (WC-2)
- Andrews, Chicago Naval Reserves (WE-2)
- Hankey, Camp Grant (WE-2)
- Pud Seidel, Pitt; Camp Greenleaf (WC-3)
- Maynard, Bremerton (WC-3)

=== Guards ===
- Emmett Keefe, Notre Dame; Great Lakes Navy (WC-2 [as t], WE-1)
- Jock Sutherland, Pitt; Camp Greenleaf (WC-1)
- Johnny Budd, Lafayette; League Island (WC-1)
- Jerry Jones, Notre Dame; Great Lakes Navy (WE-1)
- Fred Hamilton, Washington State; Mather Field (WC-2)
- Oldham, Armed Guard (WC-2)
- Knute Cauldwell, Wabash; Camp Taylor (WE-2)
- Massopust, Camp Dodge (WE-2)
- Ray Lynch, Newport (WC-3)
- Thockmorton, Pelham (WC-3)

=== Centers ===
- Charlie Bachman, Notre Dame; Great Lakes Navy (WC-1)
- Al Feeney, Notre Dame; Camp Taylor (WE-1)
- Selph, Camp Lewis (WC-2)
- William C. "Dutch" Gorgas, Chicago; Cleveland Naval Reserves (WE-2)
- Jake Risley, Oregon; Mare Island Marines (WC-3)

=== Quarterbacks ===
- Paddy Driscoll, Northwestern; Great Lakes Navy (WC-1, WE-1)
- Gaylord Stinchcomb, Ohio State; Cleveland Naval Reserves (WC-2, WE-2)
- Albright, Camp Dix (WC-3)

=== Halfbacks ===
- Jimmy DeHart, Pitt; Mather Field (WC-1)
- George Hoban, Lehigh; Camp Devens (WC-1)
- Jerry Johnson, Morningside; Chicago Naval Reserves (WE-1)
- Everett Strupper, Georgia Tech; Camp Gordon (WC-2)
- Lear, Pelham (WC-2)
- Coughlin, Camp Dodge (WE-2)
- Hal Erickson, St. Olaf's; Great Lakes Navy (WE-2)
- White, Harvard Radio (WC-3)
- Howard Berry, Penn; Camp Hancock (WC-3)

=== Fullbacks ===
- Moon Ducote, Auburn; Cleveland Naval Reserves (WC-2, WE-1 [as hb])
- Charlie Brickley, Harvard; Hoboken Trans (WC-1)
- Bob Koehler, Northwestern; Chicago Naval Reserves (WE-1)
- Hoffman, Cornell; Camp Taylor (WE-2)
- Andy Hillhouse, Brown; Camp Merritt (WC-3)

=== Key ===
- WC = Walter Camp's All-Service selection.
- WE = Walter Eckersall's All-Service selection.
- 1 – First-team selection
- 2 – Second-team selection
- 3 – Third-team selection
