= 1918 Great Lakes Navy Bluejackets football team =

American college football season

1918 Great Lakes Navy Bluejackets football
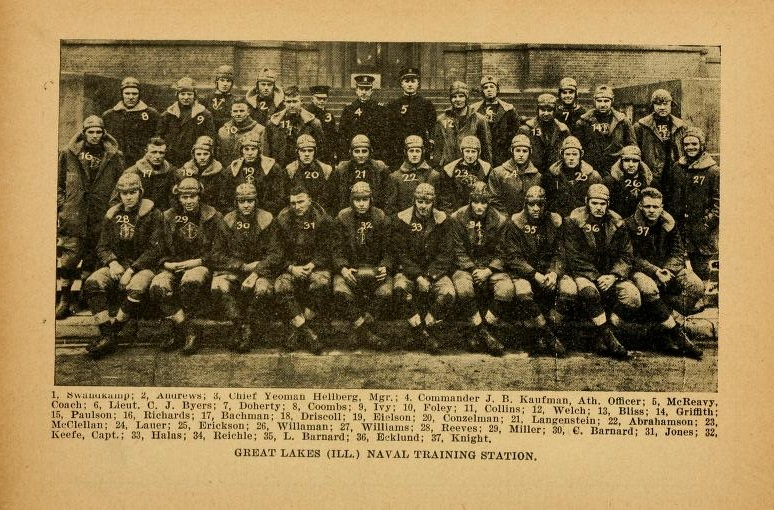

Rose Bowl champion

Rose Bowl, W 18–0 vs. Mare Island Marines
- Conference: Independent
- Record: 7–0–2
- Head coach: Herman Olcott (1st season; first 3 games); Clarence J. McReavy (1st season, final 5 games)
- Captain: Emmett Keefe

1918 military service football records
	Conf.			Overall
Team	W	L	T	W		L		T
Camp Greenleaf		–		9	–	0	–	0
Chicago Naval Reserve		–		7	–	0	–	0
Mare Island Marines		–		10	–	1	–	0
Great Lakes Navy		–		7	–	0	–	2
League Island Marines		–		7	–	1	–	0
Cleveland Naval Reserve		–		5	–	1	–	0
Camp Hancock		–		4	–	1	–	2
Camp Upton		–		4	–	1	–	2
Camp Taylor		–		3	–	1	–	1
Camp Lewis		–		7	–	2	–	0
Camp Devens		–		4	–	2	–	0
Mather Field		–		2	–	1	–	0
Camp Dodge		–		2	–	1	–	1
Camp Grant		–		3	–	3	–	0
Camp Dix		–		1	–	2	–	2
Camp Gordon		–		2	–	4	–	0
Camp Perry		–		2	–	4	–	0
Georgia Eleventh Cavalry		–		0	–	1	–	0
Mineola Aviation Station		–		0	–	3	–	0

The 1918 Great Lakes Navy Bluejackets football team represented the Naval Station Great Lakes, the United States Navy's boot camp located near North Chicago, Illinois, in college football during the 1918 college football season.

The team compiled a 7–0–2 record, won the 1919 Rose Bowl, and featured three players (George Halas, Jimmy Conzelman, and Paddy Driscoll) who were later inducted into the Pro Football Hall of Fame.

Charlie Bachman, who was later inducted into the College Football Hall of Fame as a coach, also played for the 1918 Great Lakes team. Bachman at center, and the two guards, captain Emmett Keefe and Jerry Jones, were all former players for Notre Dame. Both ends came from Illinois, Halas and Dick Reichle. Hugh Blacklock and Conrad L. Eklund were at tackle.

The team's backfield was Driscoll, Hal Erickson, Lawrence Eileson, and Blondy Reeves.

== Schedule ==
Date	Opponent	Site	Result	Attendance	Source
?	Radio School		W 26–0		
September 28	at Iowa	Iowa Field; Iowa City, IA	W 10–0	4,000	
October 12	at Illinois	Illinois Field; Champaign, IL	W 7–0	2,535	
October 26	Northwestern	Great Lakes Naval Training Station; North Chicago, IL	T 0–0	15,000	
November 9	at Notre Dame	Cartier Field; Notre Dame IN	T 7–7		
November 16	at Rutgers	Ebbets Field; Brooklyn, NY	W 54–14	10,000	
November 23	at Navy	Worden Field; Annapolis, MD	W 7–6	> 15,000	
November 30	Purdue	Northwestern Field; Evanston, IL	W 27–0		
January 1, 1919	vs. Mare Island	Tournament Park; Pasadena, CA (Rose Bowl)	W 17–0	26,000	

== Game summaries ==
=== Radio School ===
The team beat the Radio School 26–0.

=== Iowa ===
On September 28, 1918, Iowa was beaten 10–0, before a crowd of 4,000 in Iowa City. Walter Eckersall in the Chicago Tribune called it "one of the best early games seen in the west in the last decade."

=== Illinois ===
Great Lakes beat Illinois 7–0. Great Lakes scored a touchdown in the first quarter, and both teams were held scoreless thereafter. Paddy Driscoll returned the kickoff at the start of the second half for 65 yards.

=== Northwestern ===
On October 26, 1918, Northwestern was fought to a scoreless tie before a crowd of 15,000. The game was played in mud that was ankle deep.

=== Notre Dame ===
First-year head coach Knute Rockne and Notre Dame also fought to a tie, in front of the largest crowd ever assembled at Cartier Field.

=== Rutgers ===
On November 16, 1918, Driscoll scored six touchdowns, including an 80-yard run, and kicked five extra points in the Naval Station's 54–14 victory over a Rutgers team starring Paul Robeson. Rutgers had a strong season up to that point. Walter Camp called it "the most startling reversal of form that has been seen on any foot ball field."

=== Navy ===
Navy was leading 6–0 late in the game. Bill Ingram fumbled at the 10-yard line, and Great Lakes Harry Eielson picked up the ball and ran for the goal. He crossed midfield, and Gil Dobie muttered "Tackle him" to nobody in particular. A substitute lineman came off the sidelines and tackled Eielson, who was awarded with a touchdown.

=== Purdue ===
Against Purdue, Great Lakes led, 6–0, at halftime, but scored 21 points in the third quarter to extend its lead. Purdue made just two first downs.

== Postseason ==
=== Rose Bowl ===
Great Lakes Navy won the Rose Bowl over Mare Island. George Halas was the game's MVP.
