= Herman Olcott =

American football player and coach (1879–1929)

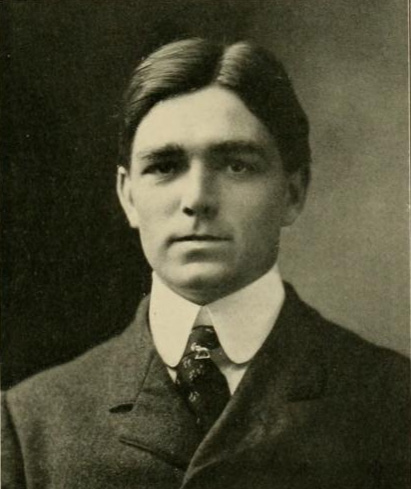
- Olcott pictured in the 1903 Yackety Yack, North Carolina yearbook

Biographical details
- Born: January 1, 1879; New York, New York, U.S.
- Died: November 3, 1929 (aged 50); Wallingford, Connecticut, U.S.

Playing career
- 1900–1901: Yale
- Position: Center

Coaching career (HC unless noted)
- 1902–1903: North Carolina
- 1904–1906: Navy (assistant)
- 1907–1912: NYU
- 1915–1917: Kansas
- 1918: Great Lakes Navy

Head coaching record
- Overall: 47–30–12

Accomplishments and honors

Awards
- Consensus All-American (1900); Third-team All-American (1901)

Herman Parker "Bo" Olcott (January 1, 1879 – November 3, 1929) was an American college football player and coach. He played football at Yale University, where he was an All-American in 1900 at center. Olcott was the head football coach at the University of North Carolina at Chapel Hill from 1902 to 1903, New York University (NYU) from 1907 to 1912, and the University of Kansas, from 1915 to 1917. He was the head coach of the Great Lakes Navy Bluejackets football team, which represented the Naval Station Great Lakes, for the first three games of the 1918 season. Olcott went to the United States Naval Academy in 1904 to assist Paul Dashiell in coaching the football team.

Olcott died on November 3, 1929, in Wallingford, Connecticut, after a three-year illness.

== Head coaching record ==
Year	Team	Overall	Conference	Standing
North Carolina Tar Heels (Independent) (1902–1903)
1902	North Carolina	5–1–3		
1903	North Carolina	6–3		
North Carolina:		11–4–3		
NYU Violets (Independent) (1907–1912)
1907	NYU	5–2		
1908	NYU	2–3–2		
1909	NYU	6–1–1		
1910	NYU	2–4–1		
1911	NYU	1–3–3		
1912	NYU	2–6		
NYU:		18–19–7		
Kansas Jayhawks (Missouri Valley Intercollegiate Athletic Association) (1915–1917)
1915	Kansas	6–2	3–1	2nd
1916	Kansas	4–3–1	1–2–1	5th
1917	Kansas	6–2	3–1	T–2nd
Kansas:		16–7–1	7–4–1	
Great Lakes Navy Bluejackets (Independent) (1918)
1918	Great Lakes Navy	2–0–1 (Note: Olcott was replaced as head coach after three games by Clarence J. McReavy. McReavy led Great Lakes Navy for the final five games of the season including the 1919 Rose Bowl. The team finished the season with a record of 6–0–2.)		
Great Lakes Navy:		2–0–1		
Total:		47–30–12		
