= Howard Berry =

Howard Berry may refer to:

- Joe Berry (second baseman) (Joseph Howard Berry Jr., 1894–1976), American baseball player
- Howard Doyle Berry (born 1941), Canadian outlaw biker, criminal and gangster
