= Dick Reichle =

American baseball and football player (1896–1967)

- Reichle c. 1923
- Outfielder
- Born: November 23, 1896; Lincoln, Illinois, U.S.
- Died: June 13, 1967 (aged 70); Richmond Heights, Missouri, U.S.
- Batted: Left Threw: Right

MLB debut
- September 19, 1922, for the Boston Red Sox

Last MLB appearance
- October 7, 1923, for the Boston Red Sox

MLB statistics
- Batting average: .257
- Home runs: 1
- Runs batted in: 39
- Stats at Baseball Reference

Teams
- Boston Red Sox (1922–1923)

Richard Wendell Reichle (November 23, 1896 – June 13, 1967) was a professional baseball player who appeared in 128 games for the Boston Red Sox of Major League Baseball (MLB) during the 1922 and 1923 seasons. Listed at 6 feet 0 inches (1.83 m) and 185 pounds (84 kg), he batted left-handed and threw right-handed. Reichle was also a college football player, and played in the National Football League (NFL) during the 1923 season.

== Biography ==
Reichle was a native of Lincoln, Illinois; he first attended Lincoln College, and later the University of Illinois. His college career was interrupted by service in the United States Navy during World War I; he played for the 1918 Great Lakes Navy Bluejackets football team that won the 1919 Rose Bowl. Reichle was also a member of the 1919 Illinois Fighting Illini football team.

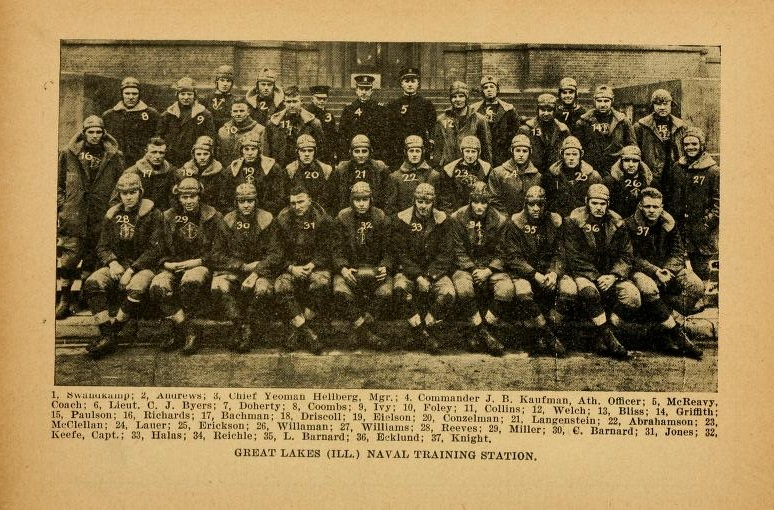
Left photo: 1918 Great Lakes Navy Bluejackets; Reichle is fourth from right in the front row; fifth from right is George Halas. Right photo: 1919 Illinois Fighting Illini; Reichle is at the left end of the front row.

In a short professional baseball career, 1922 to 1924, Reichle was primarily an outfielder who also played some games as a first baseman. He appeared in 164 minor league games and 128 major league games.

Reichle's major league debut was on September 19, 1922, appearing for the Boston Red Sox against the Cleveland Indians; he went hitless in four at bats in a 7–4 loss. Reichle got his first major league hit the next day, singling against George Uhle of the Indians in a 5–2 loss. With the 1922 Red Sox, Reichle went 6-for-24 for a .250 batting average in six games with Boston.

Reichle played in 122 games with the 1923 Red Sox, a team that compiled a 61–91 record. On April 20, 1923, Reichle hit the only home run of his career, coming off of Waite Hoyt of the New York Yankees; (Note: Reichle's home run actually bounced into the stands, as such hits were considered home runs in the American League prior to 1929; since then, they have been ground rule doubles.) it was also the first home run hit by a visiting player at Yankee Stadium, which had officially opened two days earlier. For the season, Reichle batted .258 with 39 RBIs.

Overall, Reichle appeared in 128 major league games, all with the Red Sox, recording a .257 batting average with one home run and 39 RBIs. In 101 defensive appearances (99 in the outfield, 2 at first base) he posted a .978 fielding average.

Reichle played in six games with the 1923 Milwaukee Badgers of the National Football League at right end. He was a second-team selection to the 1923 All-Pro Team by Collyer's Eye.

After his brief professional sports career, Reichle pursued a career in insurance. Per his April 1942 draft registration card, he was employed by Investors Syndicate (present-day Ameriprise Financial) in St. Louis. Reichle died at the age of 70 in Richmond Heights, Missouri, a suburb of St. Louis.
