= Benton Bangs =

American football player (1893–1970)

Profile
- Position: Halfback

Personal information
- Born: September 5, 1893; Moscow, Idaho, U.S.
- Died: June 7, 1970 (aged 76); Wenatchee, Washington, U.S.
- Listed height: 5 ft 10 in (1.78 m)
- Listed weight: 180 lb (82 kg)

Career information
- College: Washington State (1914–1917); Mare Island Marines (1918)

Career history
- Los Angeles Buccaneers (1926)

Awards and highlights
- First-team All-PCC (1917); 1916 Rose Bowl; 1919 Rose Bowl
- Stats at Pro Football Reference

Benton Maxwell "Biff" Bangs Jr. (September 5, 1893 – June 7, 1970) was an American professional football player who was a halfback for the Los Angeles Buccaneers of the National Football League (NFL) in 1926.. He played college football for Washington State from 1914 to 1917 and for the 1918 Mare Island Marines football team during World War I.

== Early life ==
Bangs was born in 1893 in Moscow, Idaho, United States. He was the son of H.H. Bangs who served several terms in the Idaho state legislature. His father died in November 1914.

== Football career ==
=== Albion ===
Bang began his college career at the Albion Normal School in Albion, Idaho. He was the team captain and star punter, rusher and passer for the Albion football team in 1913. After a strong showing, he was recruited as a transfer student by both the University of Idaho and Washington State College.

=== Washington State ===
Bangs enrolled at Washington State in September 1914. He played at the halfback and fullback positions for Washington State from 1914 to 1917. He was a key player on the 1915 Washington State football team that compiled an undefeated 7–0 record and defeated Brown in the 1916 Rose Bowl. After the team's victory in the Rose Bowl, Bangs was elected as captain of the 1916 team. He received both bachelor's and master's degrees in agriculture.

=== Mare Island Marines ===
After graduating from Washington State, Bangs was appointed county agriculturist for Skagit County, Washington. With the United States entering World War I, Bangs joined the US Marine Corps. He played for the 1918 Mare Island Marines football team that compiled a 10-0 record before losing in the 1919 Rose Bowl against Great Lakes Navy. in its coverage of the Rose Bowl game, the Los Angeles Times called Bangs "the greatest line plunger the colleges of the Pacific Coast have ever produced."

=== Professional football ===
After the war, Bangs lived for several years in Wenatchee, Washington. He played football for a local team, the Wenatchee All-Stars. In 1926, he also played professional football with the Los Angeles Buccaneers.

== Family and later years ==
Bangs moved in 1929 to Chelan, Washington, where he owned and operated an orchard. He was also a Chelan County commissioner in the 1950s and 1960s. He also raced pigeons, winning pigeon racing competitions in 1955, 1956, and 1957.

Bangs and his wife Esther had two sons, Henry H. Bangs and Benton M. Bangs Jr. He died in 1970 at age 76 at a hospital in Wenatchee.
