= 1918 Camp Lewis football team =

American college football season

1918 Camp Lewis football
- Conference: Independent
- Record: 7–2

1918 military service football records
	Conf.			Overall
Team	W	L	T	W		L		T
Camp Greenleaf		–		9	–	0	–	0
Chicago Naval Reserve		–		7	–	0	–	0
Mare Island Marines		–		10	–	1	–	0
Great Lakes Navy		–		7	–	0	–	2
League Island Marines		–		7	–	1	–	0
Cleveland Naval Reserve		–		5	–	1	–	0
Camp Hancock		–		4	–	1	–	2
Camp Upton		–		4	–	1	–	2
Camp Taylor		–		3	–	1	–	1
Camp Lewis		–		7	–	2	–	0
Camp Devens		–		4	–	2	–	0
Mather Field		–		2	–	1	–	0
Camp Dodge		–		2	–	1	–	1
Camp Grant		–		3	–	3	–	0
Camp Dix		–		1	–	2	–	2
Camp Gordon		–		2	–	4	–	0
Camp Perry		–		2	–	4	–	0
Georgia Eleventh Cavalry		–		0	–	1	–	0
Mineola Aviation Station		–		0	–	3	–	0

The 1918 Camp Lewis football team represented the United States Army's 13th Division stationed Camp Lewis in Tacoma, Washington, during the 1918 college football season. The team compiled a 7–2 record.

The 1917 Camp Lewis football team was made up from members of the Army's 91st Division. However, the 91st Division was deployed to France, and the 1918 team was made up of entirely different personnel from the 13th Division.

Ray Selph of the 1918 Camp Lewis team was selected by Walter Camp as the second-team center on the 1918 All-Service football team.

== Schedule ==
Date	Opponent	Site	Result	Attendance	Source
October 27	Multnomah Athletic Club	Camp Lewis; Tacoma, WA	W 7–0		
October 31	Foundation (Portland)	Camp Lewis; Tacoma, WA	W 21–0		
November 2	Oregon Agricultural	Camp Lewis; Tacoma, WA	W 21–6		
November 9	at Camp Perry	Bremerton, WA	W 13–0		
November 16	at Multnomah Athletic Club	"Winged M" Field; Portland, OR	L 7–17		
November 28	Mare Island Marines	Tacoma Stadium; Tacoma, WA	L 0–16	10,000	
December 7	at Vancouver Barracks	Vaughn Street Park; Portland, OR	W 19–14		
December 22	at Mare Island Navy	California Field; Berkeley, CA	W 7–6		
December 25	at Olympic Club	Ewing Field; San Francisco, CA	W 27–0		
