= 1918 Camp Dix football team =

American college football season

1918 Camp Dix football
- Conference: Independent
- Record: 1–2–2
- Head coach: Sol Metzger (1st season)

1918 military service football records
	Conf.			Overall
Team	W	L	T	W		L		T
Camp Greenleaf		–		9	–	0	–	0
Chicago Naval Reserve		–		7	–	0	–	0
Mare Island Marines		–		10	–	1	–	0
Great Lakes Navy		–		7	–	0	–	2
League Island Marines		–		7	–	1	–	0
Cleveland Naval Reserve		–		5	–	1	–	0
Camp Hancock		–		4	–	1	–	2
Camp Upton		–		4	–	1	–	2
Camp Taylor		–		3	–	1	–	1
Camp Lewis		–		7	–	2	–	0
Camp Devens		–		4	–	2	–	0
Mather Field		–		2	–	1	–	0
Camp Dodge		–		2	–	1	–	1
Camp Grant		–		3	–	3	–	0
Camp Dix		–		1	–	2	–	2
Camp Gordon		–		2	–	4	–	0
Camp Perry		–		2	–	4	–	0
Georgia Eleventh Cavalry		–		0	–	1	–	0
Mineola Aviation Station		–		0	–	3	–	0

The 1918 Camp Dix football team represented the United States Army's Camp Dix located near Trenton, New Jersey, during the 1918 college football season. Sol Metzger was the camp's Y.M.C.A. athletic director and the coach of the football team.

== Schedule ==
Date	Opponent	Site	Result	Attendance	Source
November 3	at Bristol Merchants' Ship	Merchants Shipyard field; Harriman, PA	L 0–9	1,500	
	Brooklyn Navy Yard		T 7–7		
November 24	vs. Mineola Aviation Field	Ebbets Field; Brooklyn, NY	W 12–0		
November 30	Camp Upton	City Field; Trenton, NJ	T 7–7		
December 7	vs. Camp Greenleaf	Washington, DC	L 0–34		
