= 1918 Camp Upton football team =

American college football season

1918 Camp Upton football
- Conference: Independent
- Record: 4–1–2

1918 military service football records
	Conf.			Overall
Team	W	L	T	W		L		T
Camp Greenleaf		–		9	–	0	–	0
Chicago Naval Reserve		–		7	–	0	–	0
Mare Island Marines		–		10	–	1	–	0
Great Lakes Navy		–		7	–	0	–	2
League Island Marines		–		7	–	1	–	0
Cleveland Naval Reserve		–		5	–	1	–	0
Camp Hancock		–		4	–	1	–	2
Camp Upton		–		4	–	1	–	2
Camp Taylor		–		3	–	1	–	1
Camp Lewis		–		7	–	2	–	0
Camp Devens		–		4	–	2	–	0
Mather Field		–		2	–	1	–	0
Camp Dodge		–		2	–	1	–	1
Camp Grant		–		3	–	3	–	0
Camp Dix		–		1	–	2	–	2
Camp Gordon		–		2	–	4	–	0
Camp Perry		–		2	–	4	–	0
Georgia Eleventh Cavalry		–		0	–	1	–	0
Mineola Aviation Station		–		0	–	3	–	0

The 1918 Camp Upton football team represented the United States Army stationed at Camp Upton in Yaphank on Long Island, New York, during the 1918 college football season. Former Princeton halfback Frank Glick was in charge of athletics at the camp before being transferred in November 1918. He was then replaced in that position by boxing champion Benny Leonard.

== Schedule ==
Date	Opponent	Site	Result	Attendance	Source
	Garden City Air Service		T 0–0		
	Garden City Air Service		W 6–0		
	Bay Shore Air Station		W 7–0		
November 2	vs. Mineola Aviation Station	Polo Grounds; New York, NY	W 6–0		
November 16	vs. Princeton	Polo Grounds; New York, NY	L 7–28		
November 23	Camp Mills	Brigade Field, Camp Upton; Yaphank, NY	W 39–0		
November 30	at Camp Dix	City Field; Trenton, NJ	T 7–7		
