= 1918 Mineola Aviation Station football team =

American college football season

1918 Mineola Aviation Station football
- Conference: Independent
- Record: 0–3
- Head coach: Laurence Bankart (1st season)

1918 military service football records
	Conf.			Overall
Team	W	L	T	W		L		T
Camp Greenleaf		–		9	–	0	–	0
Chicago Naval Reserve		–		7	–	0	–	0
Mare Island Marines		–		10	–	1	–	0
Great Lakes Navy		–		7	–	0	–	2
League Island Marines		–		7	–	1	–	0
Cleveland Naval Reserve		–		5	–	1	–	0
Camp Hancock		–		4	–	1	–	2
Camp Upton		–		4	–	1	–	2
Camp Taylor		–		3	–	1	–	1
Camp Lewis		–		7	–	2	–	0
Camp Devens		–		4	–	2	–	0
Mather Field		–		2	–	1	–	0
Camp Dodge		–		2	–	1	–	1
Camp Grant		–		3	–	3	–	0
Camp Dix		–		1	–	2	–	2
Camp Gordon		–		2	–	4	–	0
Camp Perry		–		2	–	4	–	0
Georgia Eleventh Cavalry		–		0	–	1	–	0
Mineola Aviation Station		–		0	–	3	–	0

The 1918 Mineola Aviation Station football team represented the United States Army aviators stationed at Mineola Aviation Station on Long Island during the 1918 college football season.

Laurence Bankart, a former Colgate football coach, was placed in charge of the Mineola aviators. He initially opposed football for his men, arguing that they could not risk injuries to their noses. Lawson Robertson, a noted track coach, was placed in charge of training.

The Spanish flu pandemic also resulted in the cancellation of many football games in October 1918. Sources indicate that Mineola had planned games with Camp Devens and Harvard, but no record has been found of those games having been played.

== Schedule ==
Date	Opponent	Site	Result	Attendance	Source
November 2	Camp Upton	Polo Grounds; New York, NY	L 0–6		
November 24	vs. Camp Dix	Ebbets Field; Brooklyn, NY	L 0–12		
December 7	at Boston College	Braves Field; Boston, MA	L 0–25		
