= 1918 Camp Perry football team =

American college football season

1918 Camp Perry football
- Conference: Independent
- Record: 2–4
- Head coach: Fred "Ham" Hamilton (1st season)
- Home stadium: Shipbuilders' Park

1918 military service football records
	Conf.			Overall
Team	W	L	T	W		L		T
Camp Greenleaf		–		9	–	0	–	0
Chicago Naval Reserve		–		7	–	0	–	0
Mare Island Marines		–		10	–	1	–	0
Great Lakes Navy		–		7	–	0	–	2
League Island Marines		–		7	–	1	–	0
Cleveland Naval Reserve		–		5	–	1	–	0
Camp Hancock		–		4	–	1	–	2
Camp Upton		–		4	–	1	–	2
Camp Taylor		–		3	–	1	–	1
Camp Lewis		–		7	–	2	–	0
Camp Devens		–		4	–	2	–	0
Mather Field		–		2	–	1	–	0
Camp Dodge		–		2	–	1	–	1
Camp Grant		–		3	–	3	–	0
Camp Dix		–		1	–	2	–	2
Camp Gordon		–		2	–	4	–	0
Camp Perry		–		2	–	4	–	0
Georgia Eleventh Cavalry		–		0	–	1	–	0
Mineola Aviation Station		–		0	–	3	–	0

The 1918 Camp Perry football team represented the sailors of the United States Navy's Puget Sound Naval Shipyard located in Bremerton, Washington, during the 1918 college football season. The team compiled a 2–4 record. The Puget Sound Naval Shipyard was the headquarters of the Thirteenth Naval District.

== Schedule ==
Date	Opponent	Site	Result	Attendance	Source
October 31	Marines, Puget Sound Naval Shipyard	Shipbuilders' Park; Bremerton, WA	W 19–6		
November 3	Camp Dewey Naval Reserves	Shipbuilders' Park; Bremerton, WA	W 6–0		
November 9	Camp Lewis	Shipbuilders' Park; Bremerton, WA	L 0–13		
November 16	Camp Dewey Naval Reserves	Shipbuilders' Park; Bremerton, WA	L 0–7		
November 24	at Vancouver Barracks Military Police	Vancouver Barracks Athletic Field; Vancouver, WA	L 6–7		
December 6	Mare Island Marines	Shipbuilders' Park; Bremerton, WA	L 0–89		
