= Laurence Bankart =

American football player and coach (1887–1978)

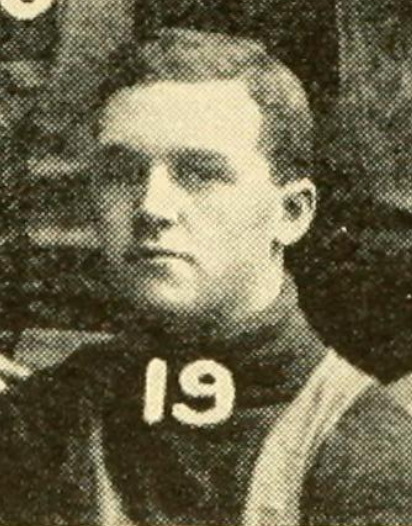
- Bankart pictured in the 1908 Dartmouth football team photo

Biographical details
- Born: October 16, 1887; Bradford, England
- Died: August 31, 1978 (aged 90); Windsor, Vermont, U.S.

Playing career
- 1907–1909: Dartmouth

Coaching career (HC unless noted)
- 1910: Colgate
- 1913–1916: Colgate
- 1918: Mineola Aviation Station

Head coaching record
- Overall: 28–10–3

Laurence Hardy Bankart (October 16, 1887 – August 31, 1978) was an American college football player and coach. He was the head football coach at Colgate University for five seasons, in 1910 and again from 1913 until 1916, compiling a record of 28–7–3. Bankhart's five years as coach was the longest-tenured football coach at Colgate since the first coach Samuel Colgate Jr. headed the program for three years (some sources say two) until 1929, when Andrew Kerr took over the program for 18 seasons. Bankart was born on October 16, 1887, in Bradford, England.

== Head coaching record ==
Year	Team	Overall	Conference	Standing	Bowl/playoffs
Colgate (Independent) (1910)
1910	Colgate	4–2–1			
Colgate (Independent) (1913–1916)
1913	Colgate	6–1–1			
1914	Colgate	5–2–1			
1915	Colgate	5–1			
1916	Colgate	8–1			
Colgate:		28–7–3			
Mineola Aviation Station (Independent) (1918)
1918	Mineola Aviation Station	0–3			
Mineola Aviation Station:		0–3			
Total:		28–10–3			

== See also ==
- List of college football head coaches with non-consecutive tenure
