= Andrew W. Smith =

American physician

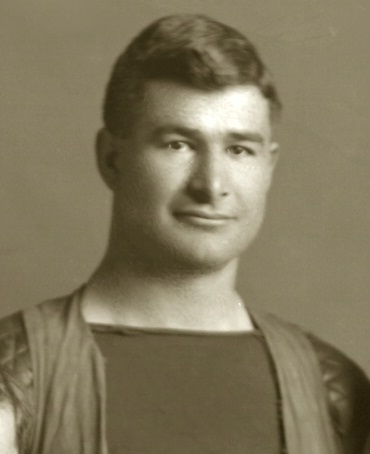

Biographical details
- Born: December 9, 1886; Fredonia, Kansas, U.S.
- Died: September 6, 1959 (aged 72); Corona del Mar, California, U.S.

Playing career
- 1909: Michigan
- Positions: Guard, center

Coaching career (HC unless noted)
- 1911–1912: Michigan (assistant)
- 1914: Throop
- 1915: California (assistant)
- 1916: Throop
- 1918: Camp Greenleaf

Administrative career (AD unless noted)
- 1914–?: Throop

Andrew William Smith (December 9, 1886 – September 6, 1959) was an American college football player and coach, athletics administrator, United States Army officer, and physician.

Smith grew up in Fredonia, Kansas and enrolled at the Homeopathic Medical School at the University of Michigan, receiving his degree in 1912. While attending medical school, he played football for the 1909 Michigan Wolverines football team. He was selected by Walter Eckersall in the Chicago Tribune as the first-team center on their 1909 All-Western college football team, and by E. C. Patterson in Collier's Weekly as the second-team center.

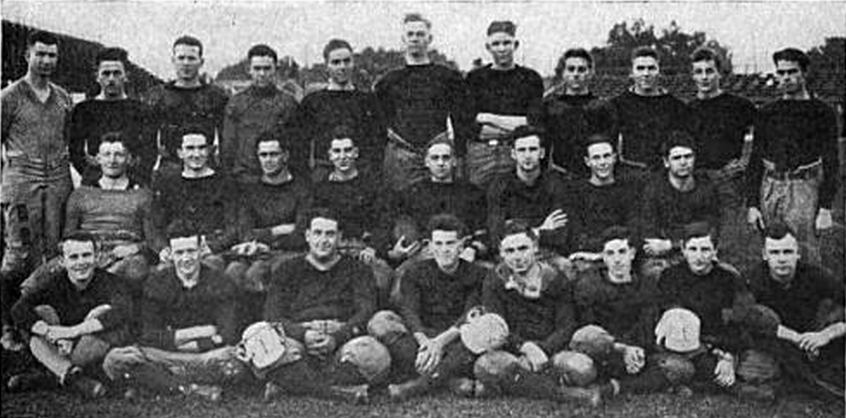
Throop football team, c. 1917, Smith back row left.

Smith was an assistant coach for the Michigan Wolverines football team in 1911 and 1912. In August 1914, Smith was hired as the athletic director head football coach at Throop College of Technology (now known as California Institute of Technology) in Pasadena, California. Upon his hiring, The Lancet-Clinic reported that the school had "procured the services of a 'medical coach'" who would "both teach the Throop students how to pay football and attend them in case of injury." In 1915, Smith worked as a football coach at the University of California, Berkeley, assisting head football coach Jimmie Schaeffer. In 1916, he returned to Throop as head football coach. Smith continued to coach the Throop football team through at least 1917.

Smith organized a Red Cross Medical Corps in California at the beginning of the United States' involvement in World War I. He was sent to officer's training school at Camp Funston and was then stationed at Fort Oglethorpe in Georgia. Ranking as a lieutenant, he coached the 1918 Camp Greenleaf football team at Fort Oglethorpe until he was sent overseas in November 1918. However, the Armistice of 11 November 1918 was signed before he reached France. Smith was then promoted to captain in the medical reserve corps of the regular United States Army.

In the early 1920s, Smith was stationed at Crissy Field, an army airfield in San Francisco. In late 1922, he was sent to France Field in the Panama Canal Zone.
