= 1918 Camp Hancock football team =

American college football season

1918 Camp Hancock football

Service champion of the South
- Conference: Independent
- Record: 4–1–2
- Head coach: Howard Berry (1st season)
- Captain: Howard Berry

1918 military service football records
	Conf.			Overall
Team	W	L	T	W		L		T
Camp Greenleaf		–		9	–	0	–	0
Chicago Naval Reserve		–		7	–	0	–	0
Mare Island Marines		–		10	–	1	–	0
Great Lakes Navy		–		7	–	0	–	2
League Island Marines		–		7	–	1	–	0
Cleveland Naval Reserve		–		5	–	1	–	0
Camp Hancock		–		4	–	1	–	2
Camp Upton		–		4	–	1	–	2
Camp Taylor		–		3	–	1	–	1
Camp Lewis		–		7	–	2	–	0
Camp Devens		–		4	–	2	–	0
Mather Field		–		2	–	1	–	0
Camp Dodge		–		2	–	1	–	1
Camp Grant		–		3	–	3	–	0
Camp Dix		–		1	–	2	–	2
Camp Gordon		–		2	–	4	–	0
Camp Perry		–		2	–	4	–	0
Georgia Eleventh Cavalry		–		0	–	1	–	0
Mineola Aviation Station		–		0	–	3	–	0

The 1918 Camp Hancock football team represented Camp Hancock during the 1918 college football season.

The 66 points scored on Clemson remained the highest total scored on a Clemson team until 1931 and remains the third-highest total ever allowed by Clemson.

== Schedule ==
Date	Opponent	Site	Result	Attendance	Source
October 26	at Vanderbilt	Dudley Field; Nashville, TN	W 25–6		
November 2	Camp Gordon	Grant Field; Atlanta, GA	W 16–6		
November 9	at Clemson	Riggs Field; Calhoun, SC	W 64–13		
November 9	Charleston Navy Yard	Augusta, GA	T 7–7		
November 16	at Camp Zachary Taylor	Eclipse Park; Louisville, KY	T 0–0		
November 28	at Camp Gordon	Warren Park; Augusta, GA	W 7–0		
December 7	at League Island Marines	Franklin Field; Philadelphia, PA	L 6–13	12,000	
