= 1918 Camp Devens football team =

American college football season

1918 Camp Devens football
- Conference: Independent
- Record: 4–2
- Head coach: George Hoban (1st season)
- Captain: George Hoban

1918 military service football records
| | Conf. | | | Overall |
| Team | W | L | T | W | | L | | T |
|---|---|---|---|---|---|---|---|---|
| Camp Greenleaf | | – | | 9 | – | 0 | – | 0 |
| Chicago Naval Reserve | | – | | 7 | – | 0 | – | 0 |
| Mare Island Marines | | – | | 10 | – | 1 | – | 0 |
| Great Lakes Navy | | – | | 7 | – | 0 | – | 2 |
| League Island Marines | | – | | 7 | – | 1 | – | 0 |
| Cleveland Naval Reserve | | – | | 5 | – | 1 | – | 0 |
| Camp Hancock | | – | | 4 | – | 1 | – | 2 |
| Camp Upton | | – | | 4 | – | 1 | – | 2 |
| Camp Taylor | | – | | 3 | – | 1 | – | 1 |
| Camp Lewis | | – | | 7 | – | 2 | – | 0 |
| Camp Devens | | – | | 4 | – | 2 | – | 0 |
| Mather Field | | – | | 2 | – | 1 | – | 0 |
| Camp Dodge | | – | | 2 | – | 1 | – | 1 |
| Camp Grant | | – | | 3 | – | 3 | – | 0 |
| Camp Dix | | – | | 1 | – | 2 | – | 2 |
| Camp Gordon | | – | | 2 | – | 4 | – | 0 |
| Camp Perry | | – | | 2 | – | 4 | – | 0 |
| Georgia Eleventh Cavalry | | – | | 0 | – | 1 | – | 0 |
| Mineola Aviation Station | | – | | 0 | – | 3 | – | 0 |

The 1918 Camp Devens football team was an American football team that represented the United States Army stationed at Camp Devens in Ayer, Massachusetts, during the 1918 fall football season. George Hoban served as both the team captain and coach. The team compiled a 4–2 record.

== Schedule ==
| Date | Opponent | Site | Result | Attendance | Source |
|---|---|---|---|---|---|
| October 26 | at Boston College | Braves Field; Boston, MA | L 0–13 | | |
| November 2 | at Brown | Andrews Field; Providence, RI | W 20–7 | | |
| November 9 | vs. Camp Merritt | Braves Field; Boston, MA | W 13–7 | | |
| November 16 | vs. U.S. Navy Radio School | Harvard Stadium; Boston, MA | W 20–0 | 18,000 | |
| November 23 | Garden City Aviators | Ebbets Field; Brooklyn, NY | W 21–0 | | |
| November 28 | Bumkin Island/First Naval District | Salem Common; Salem, MA | L 7–14 | 10,000 | |
