= Lewis Omer =

American sports coach (1876–1954)

Biographical details
- Born: August 26, 1876; Clayton, Illinois, U.S.
- Died: January 3, 1954 (aged 77); Carthage, Illinois, U.S.

Playing career

Football
- 1902: Illinois

Coaching career (HC unless noted)

Football
- 1918: Camp Grant
- 1921–1935: Carthage

Basketball
- 1921–1927: Carthage

Track
- 1911–1917: Northwestern

Administrative career (AD unless noted)
- 1921–1936: Carthage

Head coaching record
- Overall: 54–55–18 (football)

Lewis Omer (August 28, 1876 – January 3, 1954) was an American football, basketball, and track coach.

Omer was born in 1876 in Clayton, Illinois. He attended the University of Illinois, graduating in 1902.

After graduating from Illinois, Omer became a school teacher. He then coached track and worked in the athletic department at Northwestern University from 1911 to 1917. He joined the United States Army in 1917, reached the rank of major, and was discharged in 1921.

From 1921 to 1936, Omer was the athletic director at Carthage College in Carthage, Illinois. He was also the head coach for the Carthage football team for 15 seasons, from 1921 until 1935 compiling a record of 51–52–18. Omer later served as a mathematics professor at Carthage.

== Head coaching record ==
=== Football ===
Year	Team	Overall	Conference	Standing	Bowl/playoffs
Camp Grant (Independent) (1918)
1918	Camp Grant	3–3			
Camp Grant:		3–3			
Carthage Red Men (Illinois Intercollegiate Athletic Conference) (1921–1935)
1921	Carthage	6–2	4–2		
1922	Carthage	5–4	2–2	T–8th	
1923	Carthage	4–3–1	2–3–1	T–13th	
1924	Carthage	3–4–1	2–3–1	T–14th	
1925	Carthage	4–4–1	3–2–1	T–7th	
1926	Carthage	3–3–2	2–3–1	T–13th	
1927	Carthage	2–3–2	1–2–2	T–16th	
1928	Carthage	2–3–2	2–2–1	T–13th	
1929	Carthage	4–3–1	2–2–1	T–12th	
1930	Carthage	3–4–1	3–3	T–12th	
1931	Carthage	4–4–1	3–3–1	T–9th	
1932	Carthage	1–4–4	0–4–3	T–18th	
1933	Carthage	4–1–2	3–1–1	8th	
1934	Carthage	2–6	1–4	T–13th	
1935	Carthage	4–4	2–3	12th	
Carthage:		51–52–18	32–39–13		
Total:		54–55–18			
