= Byron W. Dickson =

American football player and sports coach (1875–1930)

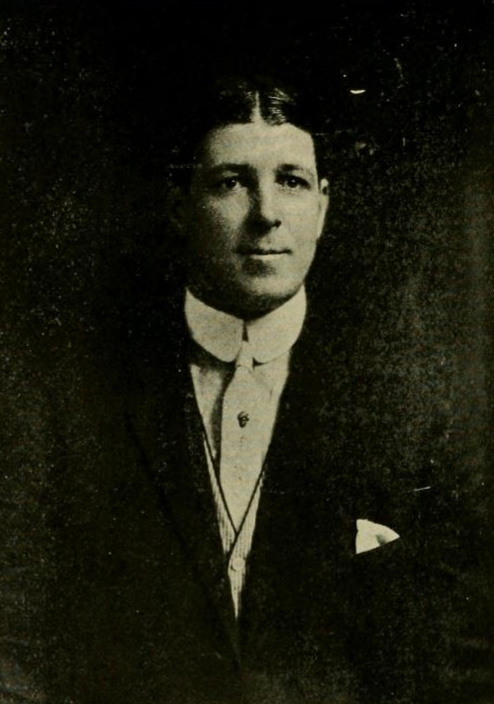
- Dickson pictured in The Epitome 1910, Lehigh yearbook

Biographical details
- Born: March 18, 1875; Philadelphia, Pennsylvania, U.S.
- Died: May 22, 1930 (aged 55); Miami Beach, Florida, U.S.

Playing career

Football
- 1895–1897: Penn
- 1899: Duquesne Country & AC
- Position: End

Coaching career (HC unless noted)

Football
- 1898: Colby
- 1900: Gettysburg
- 1901: South Carolina
- 1905: Penn (field)
- 1906–1909: Lehigh
- 1910–1913: Bucknell
- 1915: Penn (field)
- 1916: Penn (chief assistant)
- 1917: Scott HS (OH)
- 1918: League Island Marines
- 1919: Franklin & Marshall
- 1920: Penn (assistant backfield)

Basketball
- 1919–1920: Franklin & Marshall

Baseball
- 1909–1910: Lehigh
- 1911–1913: Bucknell
- 1920: Franklin & Marshall

Administrative career (AD unless noted)
- 1901: South Carolina

Head coaching record
- Overall: 55–49–9 (football); 7–6 (basketball); 45–53 (baseball)

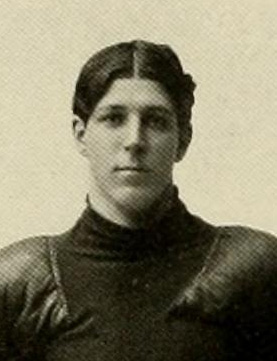
Dickson pictured in L'Agenda 1916, Bucknell yearbook

Byron Wright "By" Dickson (March 18, 1875 – May 22, 1930) was an American football player and coach of football, basketball, and baseball. He served as the head football coach at Colby College (1898), Gettysburg College (1900), the University of South Carolina (1901), Lehigh University (1906–1909), Bucknell University (1910–1913), Scott High School (1917), and Franklin & Marshall (1919). Dickson was also the head baseball coach at Lehigh (1909–1910), Bucknell (1911–1913), and Franklin & Marshall (1920), amassing a career college baseball record of 45–53. In addition, he served as the head basketball coach at Franklin & Marshall during the 1919–20 season, tallying a mark of 7–6.

Dickson was born in Germantown, Pennsylvania. He played college football at the University of Pennsylvania from 1895 to 1897 as an end. In 1899, Dickson played professional football for the Duquesne Country and Athletic Club. He died on May 22, 1930, in Miami Beach, Florida.

== Coaching career ==
Dickson began his coaching career in 1898 when he was hired as the football coach at Colby College in Waterville, Maine.

== Head coaching record ==
=== Football ===
Year	Team	Overall	Conference	Standing	Bowl/playoffs
Colby Mules (Independent) (1898)
1898	Colby	1–5			
Colby:		1–5			
Gettysburg (Independent) (1900)
1900	Gettysburg	3–6–1			
Gettysburg:		3–6–1			
South Carolina Gamecocks (Independent) (1901)
1901	South Carolina	3–4			
South Carolina:		3–4			
Lehigh Brown and White (Independent) (1906–1909)
1906	Lehigh	5–5–1			
1907	Lehigh	7–2–1			
1908	Lehigh	4–3			
1909	Lehigh	4–3–2			
Lehigh:		20–13–4			
Bucknell (Independent) (1910–1913)
1910	Bucknell	2–6			
1911	Bucknell	6–3–1			
1912	Bucknell	6–3–1			
1913	Bucknell	6–4			
Bucknell:		20–16–2			
League Island Marines (Independent) (1918)
1918	League Island Marines	7–1			
League Island Marines:		7–1			
Franklin & Marshall (Independent) (1919)
1919	Franklin & Marshall	2–4–2			
Franklin & Marshall:		2–4–2			
Total:		55–49–9			
