= 1918 Camp Dodge football team =

American college football season

1918 Camp Dodge football
- Conference: Independent
- Record: 2–1–1
- Head coach: Maj. Dean (1st season)

1918 military service football records
	Conf.			Overall
Team	W	L	T	W		L		T
Camp Greenleaf		–		9	–	0	–	0
Chicago Naval Reserve		–		7	–	0	–	0
Mare Island Marines		–		10	–	1	–	0
Great Lakes Navy		–		7	–	0	–	2
League Island Marines		–		7	–	1	–	0
Cleveland Naval Reserve		–		5	–	1	–	0
Camp Hancock		–		4	–	1	–	2
Camp Upton		–		4	–	1	–	2
Camp Taylor		–		3	–	1	–	1
Camp Lewis		–		7	–	2	–	0
Camp Devens		–		4	–	2	–	0
Mather Field		–		2	–	1	–	0
Camp Dodge		–		2	–	1	–	1
Camp Grant		–		3	–	3	–	0
Camp Dix		–		1	–	2	–	2
Camp Gordon		–		2	–	4	–	0
Camp Perry		–		2	–	4	–	0
Georgia Eleventh Cavalry		–		0	–	1	–	0
Mineola Aviation Station		–		0	–	3	–	0

The 1918 Camp Dodge football team was an American football team that represented Camp Dodge near Des Moines, Iowa, during the 1918 college football season. The team, consisting of soldiers stationed at Camp Dodge, compiled a 2–1–1 record.

== Schedule ==
Date	Opponent	Site	Result	Source
November 16	at Chicago Naval Reserve	Weeghman Park; Chicago, IL	L 0–20	
November 23	at Nebraska	Nebraska Field; Lincoln, NE	W 23–7	
November 28	vs. Camp Funston	Kansas City, MO	W 7–0	
November 30	Iowa	Johnston, IA	T 0–0	
