= 1918 Mare Island Marines football team =

American college football season

1918 Mare Island Marines football
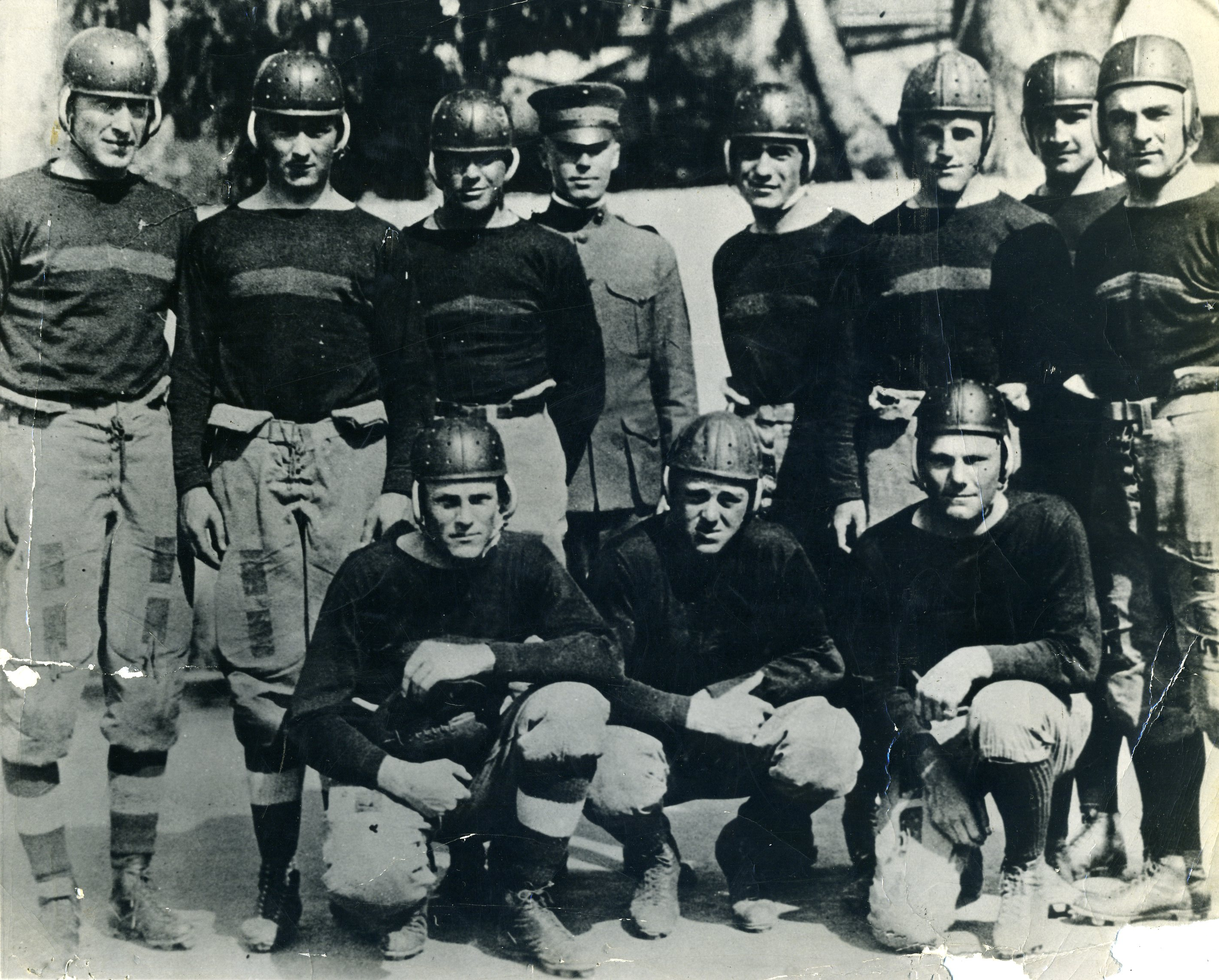

Rose Bowl, L 0–18 vs. Great Lakes Navy
- Conference: Independent
- Record: 10–1
- Head coach: William Henry Dietz (1st season)

1918 military service football records
	Conf.			Overall
Team	W	L	T	W		L		T
Camp Greenleaf		–		9	–	0	–	0
Chicago Naval Reserve		–		7	–	0	–	0
Mare Island Marines		–		10	–	1	–	0
Great Lakes Navy		–		7	–	0	–	2
League Island Marines		–		7	–	1	–	0
Cleveland Naval Reserve		–		5	–	1	–	0
Camp Hancock		–		4	–	1	–	2
Camp Upton		–		4	–	1	–	2
Camp Taylor		–		3	–	1	–	1
Camp Lewis		–		7	–	2	–	0
Camp Devens		–		4	–	2	–	0
Mather Field		–		2	–	1	–	0
Camp Dodge		–		2	–	1	–	1
Camp Grant		–		3	–	3	–	0
Camp Dix		–		1	–	2	–	2
Camp Gordon		–		2	–	4	–	0
Camp Perry		–		2	–	4	–	0
Georgia Eleventh Cavalry		–		0	–	1	–	0
Mineola Aviation Station		–		0	–	3	–	0

The 1918 Mare Island Marines football team represented the United States Marine Corps stationed at the Mare Island Naval Shipyard in Vallejo, California, during the 1918 college football season. The team lost to the Great Lakes Navy Bluejackets in the 1919 Rose Bowl. Prior to the Rose Bowl, the team had compiled a 10–0 record, shut out seven opponents, and outscored all opponents by a combined total of 454 to 28.

The team was built around Marines from the Pacific Northwest. Dick Hanley, who had played at Washington State, was the team's quarterback. Benton Bangs, another former Washington State backfield star, joined the team in November. The team's athletic director, Lynn Coovert, was an attorney from Portland. Before the season began, Hanley and Coovert lobbied Washington State's football coach, William "Lone Star" Dietz, to coach the Mare Island team as part of his patriotic duty. Dietz, who had led the 1915 Washington State team to an undefeated season and a victory in the 1916 Rose Bowl, agreed to take the position.

After two early victories in September, the season was interrupted in October when the Spanish flu pandemic caused a quarantine of Mare Island. The Oakland Tribune on October 2 reported that, despite the quarantine, the football team continued its daily practice. After the quarantine was lifted, the team won eight consecutive games, including four victories during a two-week trip to the Pacific Northwest.

== Schedule ==
Date	Opponent	Site	Result	Attendance	Source
September 21	at Goat Island Naval Training Station	Grove Street Ball Park; Oakland, CA	W 31–0	5,000	
September 27	at Camp Fremont	Camp Fremont, CA	W 66–0		
November 2	at Fort Baker	San Francisco	W 67–0		
November 16	vs. Saint Mary's	California Field; Berkeley, CA	W 34–7		
November 23	at Vancouver Barracks	Portland baseball field; Portland, OR	W 39–0	2,200	
November 28	at Camp Lewis	Tacoma Stadium; Tacoma, WA	W 16–0	10,000	
November 30	vs. Idaho	Interstate Fairgrounds; Spokane, WA	W 68–0	4,000	
December 6	at Camp Perry	Shipbuilders' Park; Bremerton, WA	W 89–0		
December 14	vs. Mather Field Aviation Training Station	California Field; Berkeley, CA	W 30–13	5,000	
December 25	Balboa Park Naval Training Camp	Vallejo, CA	W 12–7		
January 1, 1919	vs. Great Lakes Navy	Tournament Park; Pasadena, CA (Rose Bowl)	L 0–17	26,000	
