= George Halas =

American football player and coach (1895–1983)

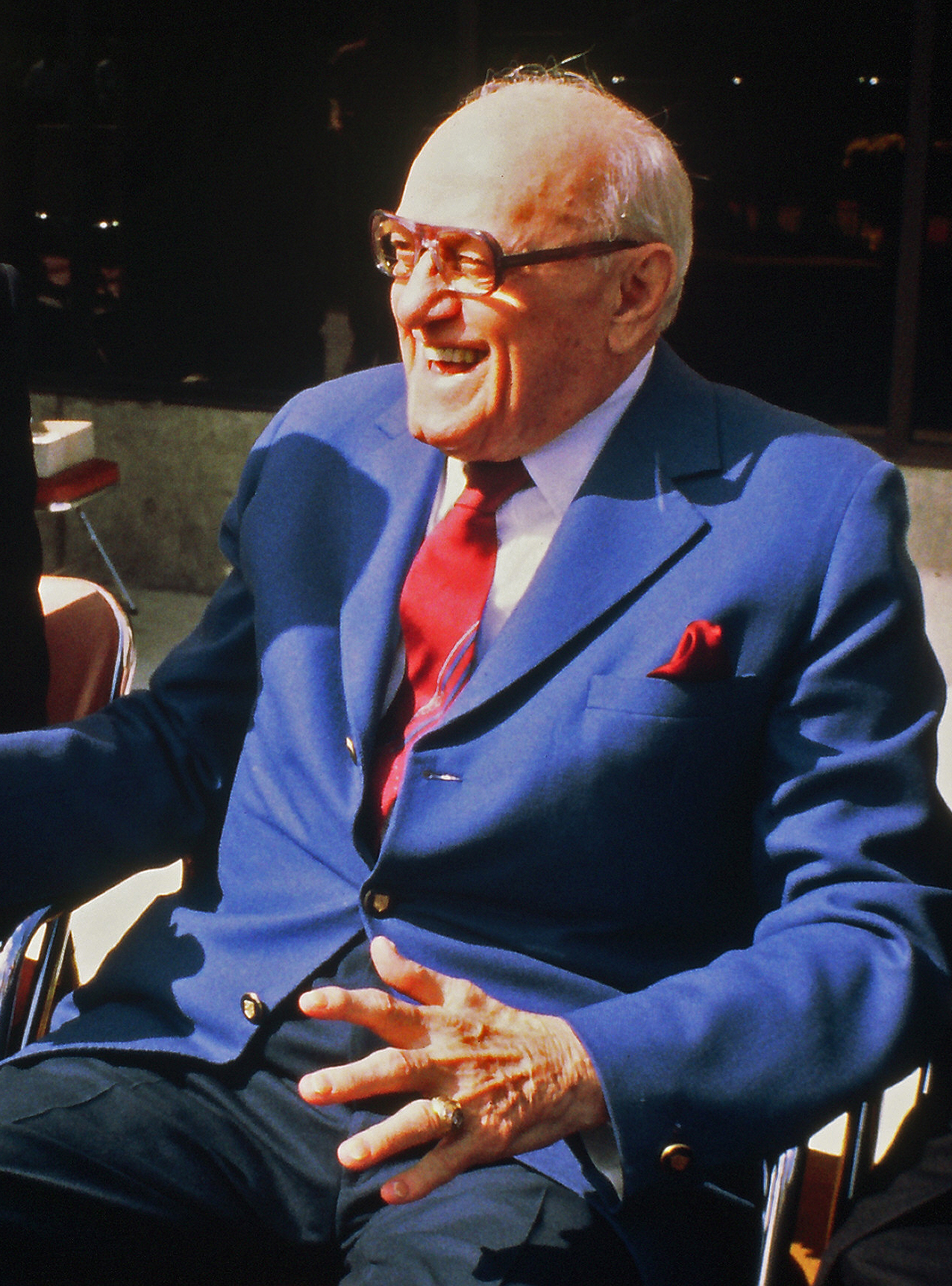
- Halas in 1982
- Born: George Stanley Halas; February 2, 1895; Chicago, Illinois, U.S.
- Died: October 31, 1983 (aged 88); Chicago, Illinois, U.S.
- Spouse: Wilhelmina "Minnie" Bushing (m. 1922; died 1966)
- Children: Virginia Halas McCaskey and George Halas Jr.
- Football career
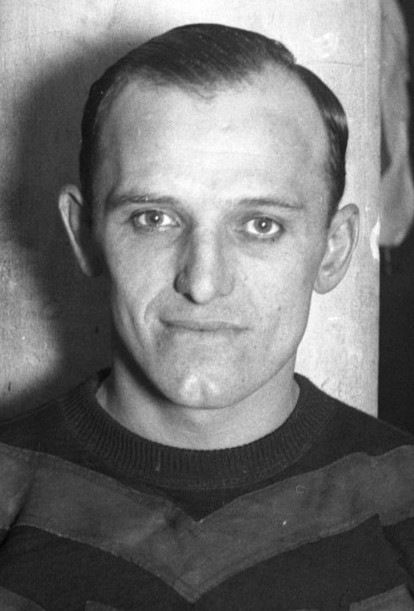
- Halas with the Chicago Bears in 1922

No. 7
- Position: End

Personal information
- Listed height: 6 ft 0 in (1.83 m)
- Listed weight: 182 lb (83 kg)

Career information
- High school: Crane (Chicago, IL)
- College: Illinois (1914–1917); Great Lakes Navy (1918)

Career history

Playing
- Hammond All-Stars (1919); Decatur / Chicago Staleys / Bears (1920–1929); Chicago Stayms (1920)

Coaching
- Decatur / Chicago Staleys / Bears (1920–1929, 1933–1942, 1946–1955, 1958–1967) Head coach

Operations
- Decatur / Chicago Staleys / Bears (1920–1983) Owner; Newark Bears / Bombers (1939–1941) Owner; Akron Bears (1946) Owner

Awards and highlights
- 8× NFL champion (1921, 1932, 1933, 1940, 1941, 1943, 1946, 1963); 2× AP NFL Coach of the Year (1963, 1965); NFL 1920s All-Decade Team; NFL 100th Anniversary All-Time Team; Sporting News 1940s All-Decade Team; Second-team All-Pro (1920); Chicago Bears No. 7 retired; 100 greatest Bears of All-Time; Second-team All-Service (1918)

Career statistics
- Games played: 104
- Touchdowns: 10
- Stats at Pro Football Reference

Head coaching record
- Regular season: 318–148–31 (.671)
- Postseason: 6–3 (.667)
- Career: 324–151–31 (.671)
- Coaching profile at Pro Football Reference
- Executive profile at Pro Football Reference
- Pro Football Hall of Fame
- Baseball career
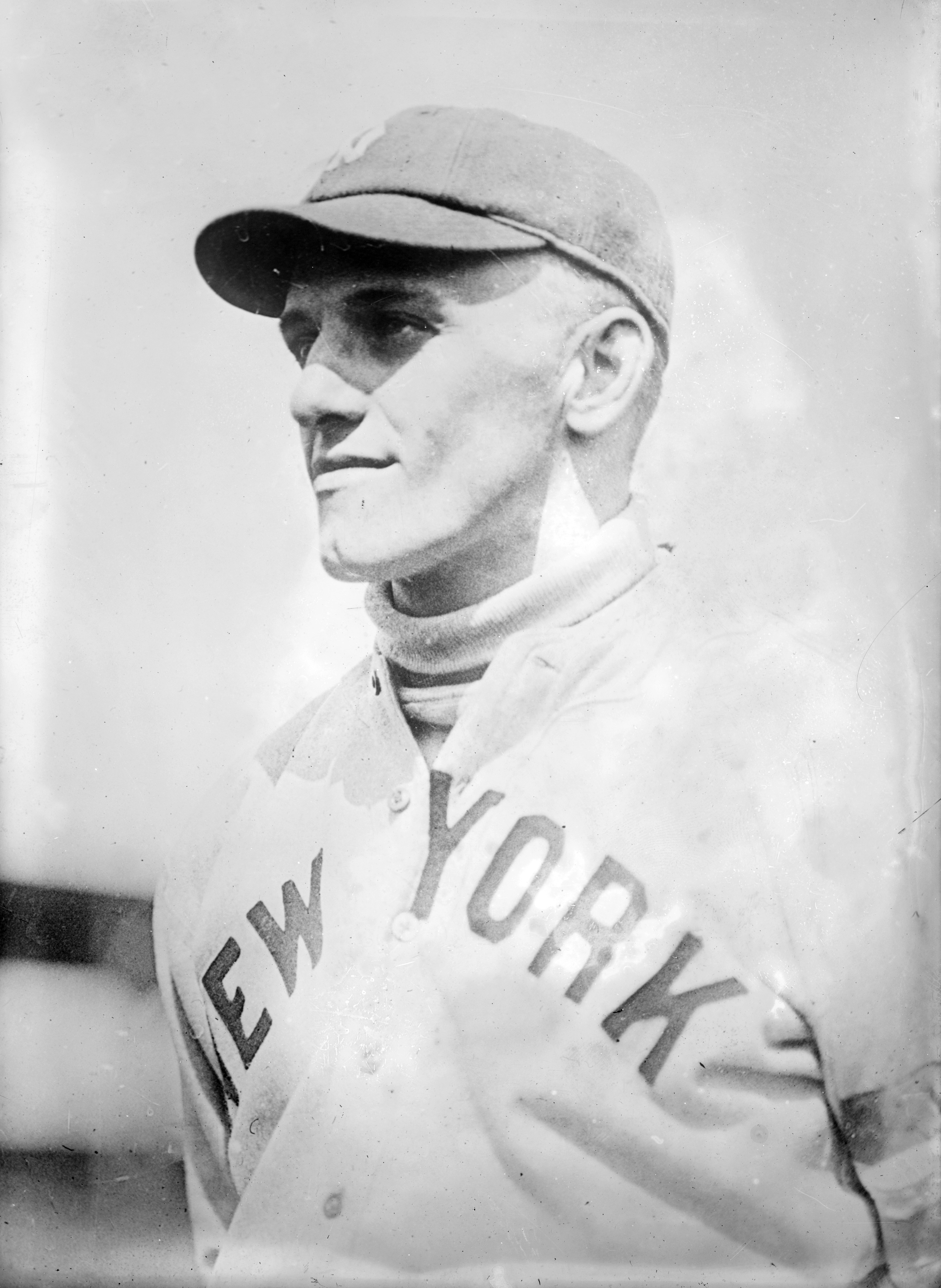
- Halas with the New York Yankees in 1918
- Right fielder
- Batted: Switch Threw: Right

MLB debut
- May 6, 1919, for the New York Yankees

Last appearance
- July 5, 1919, for the New York Yankees

MLB statistics (through 1919)
- Batting average: .091
- Home runs: 0
- Runs batted in: 0
- Stats at Baseball Reference

Teams
- New York Yankees (1919)
- Last updated on: February 27, 2025
- Military career
- Allegiance: United States
- Branch: United States Navy
- Service years: 1918, 1942–1946
- Rank: Captain
- Unit: Seventh Fleet
- Conflicts: World War I World War II
- Awards: Bronze Star

George Stanley Halas Sr. (February 2, 1895 – October 31, 1983), nicknamed "Papa Bear", was an American professional football end, coach, and executive. He was the founder and owner of the Chicago Bears of the National Football League (NFL), and served as his own head coach on four occasions. He was also lesser-known as a player for the New York Yankees of Major League Baseball (MLB). He is the namesake for the NFC Championship trophy.

Halas was one of the co-founders of the American Professional Football Association (now the NFL) in 1920, and in 1963 became one of the first 17 inductees into the Pro Football Hall of Fame. Halas was the oldest person in NFL history to serve as a head coach, aged 72 years and 318 days when he coached the final game of his career in December 1967, a record that stood for over 50 years until Romeo Crennel became the interim head coach of the Houston Texans in October 2020, aged 73 years and 115 days.

== Early life ==
Halas was born in Chicago, Illinois, into a family of Czech-Bohemian immigrants. His parents, Barbara (Poledna), who ran a grocery store, and Frank Halas, a tailor, were migrants from Pilsen, Austria-Hungary. He was the brother of Walter Halas. George had a varied career in sports. In 1915, Halas worked temporarily for Western Electric, and was planning on being on the SS Eastland. He was running late, however, as he was attempting to gain weight to play Big Ten football and missed the capsizing, which killed 844 passengers.

On February 18, 1922, Halas married Wilhelmina "Minnie" Bushing, to whom he remained married until her death in 1966.

== College career ==
After graduating from Crane High School in Chicago, he attended the University of Illinois at Urbana-Champaign, playing football for coach Bob Zuppke, as well as baseball and basketball, and earning a degree in civil engineering. He also became a member of Tau Kappa Epsilon fraternity. He helped Illinois win the 1918 Big Ten Conference football title.

Serving as an ensign in the Navy during World War I, he played for a team at the Great Lakes Naval Training Station, and was named the MVP of the 1919 Rose Bowl. In recognition of his Rose Bowl accomplishments, Halas was inducted into the Rose Bowl Hall of Fame in 2018. On a team which included Paddy Driscoll and Jimmy Conzelman, Halas scored a receiving touchdown and returned an intercepted pass 77 yards in a 17–0 win over the Mare Island Marines of California; the team was also rewarded with their military discharges.

== Baseball career ==
Afterward, Halas played minor league baseball, eventually earning a promotion to the New York Yankees, where he played 12 games as an outfielder in 1919. However, a hip injury effectively ended his baseball career. Halas said that he was succeeded as the Yankees' right fielder by Babe Ruth, but in reality, it was Sammy Vick.

== Football career ==
=== Hammond All-Stars ===
Halas signed his first professional football contract with the independent Hammond All-Stars, who would become the Hammond Pros the next season.

=== Decatur / Chicago Staleys / Bears ===
Halas moved to Decatur, Illinois, to take a position with the A. E. Staley Company, a starch manufacturer. He served as a company sales representative, an outfielder on the company-sponsored baseball team, and the player-coach of the company-sponsored football team the Decatur Staleys. Halas selected his alma mater's colors—orange and navy blue—for the team's uniforms. In 1920, Halas represented the Staleys at the meeting which formed the American Professional Football Association (which became the National Football League in 1922) in Canton, Ohio. After the Staleys' season ended, Halas and teammates George Trafton, Hub Shoemake, and Hugh Blacklock joined the Chicago Stayms for a December 19 match against the Chicago Cardinals, marking the only time Halas would be an NFL team's opponent for another team besides the Staleys/Bears. The game ended in a 14–14 tie.

Despite a 10–1–2 record, the Staleys ended the season awash in red ink. The Staleys' financial troubles didn't dissuade Halas from significantly upgrading the roster, to the point that it was a works team in name only. After the first game of the 1921 season, company founder and namesake Augustus E. Staley turned over control of the team to Halas so he could move the team to Chicago, where the team had attracted its biggest gates of the 1920 season. Staley gave Halas a $5,000 bonus for the move to Chicago provided that he keep the Staleys franchise name for the 1921 season. Halas then took on teammate Edward "Dutch" Sternaman as a partner. The newly minted "Chicago Staleys" set up shop at Cubs Park, soon to be known as Wrigley Field; Halas had a good relationship with Chicago Cubs owner William Wrigley Jr. and president Bill Veeck Sr. The Staleys maneuvered their schedule to win their first NFL championship that year. The following year, Halas renamed his team the "Chicago Bears." Years later, he recalled that he wanted to find a way to choose a name that would give a nod to the Cubs. Reasoning that football players were far bigger than baseball players, he concluded, "if baseball players are cubs, then football players must be bears!"

Halas was not only the team's coach but also played end (wide receiver on offense, defensive end on defense) and handled ticket sales and the business of running the club. Named to the NFL's all-pro team in the 1920s, his playing highlight occurred in a 1923 game when he stripped Jim Thorpe of the ball, recovered the fumble, and returned it 98 yards—a league record which would stand until 1972. In 1925, Halas persuaded Illinois star player Red Grange to join the Bears; it was a significant step in establishing the league's respectability and popularity, which had previously been viewed as a refuge for less admirable players.

After ten seasons, Halas stepped back from the game in 1930, retiring as a player and handing coaching duties to Lake Forest Academy coach Ralph Jones; but he remained the team's owner, becoming sole owner in 1932. However, severe financial difficulties brought on by the Great Depression put the Bears in dire financial straits even though Jones led them to the NFL title in 1932.

Halas returned as coach in 1933 to eliminate the additional cost of paying a head coach's salary. He coached the Bears for another ten seasons. His 1934 team was undefeated until a loss in the championship game to the New York Giants.

In the late 1930s, Halas—with University of Chicago coach Clark Shaughnessy—refined the T-formation system to create a groundbreaking style of play, which drove the Bears to a 73–0 victory over the Washington Redskins in the 1940 NFL Championship Game—still the most lopsided margin of victory in NFL history. Every other team in the league immediately began trying to imitate the format. The Bears repeated as NFL champions in 1941 and 1943, and the 1940s would be remembered as the era of the "Monsters of the Midway".

Halas and Shaughnessy had created a revolutionary concept with the T-formation offense. The complex spins, turns, fakes, and all-around athletic versatility required to execute the scheme limited the possible players available. Halas believed he'd found the perfect quarterback for his new offense in Sid Luckman, a passing star at Columbia University. Luckman was a single wing tailback; the tailback is the primary runner and passer in that scheme. Luckman launched his Hall of Fame career playing quarterback for the Bears from 1939 to 1950. Halas was not satisfied with other players who succeeded Luckman under center. During this coaching stint, he had on the Bears roster two future Hall of Fame players, Bobby Layne in 1948 and George Blanda from 1949 to 1958. Other notable players included Heisman Trophy winner Johnny Lujack from 1948 to 1951 and Zeke Bratkowski from 1954 to 1960. Blanda played in the NFL until 1975; Bratkowski moved on the Los Angeles Rams before signing with Vince Lombardi's Green Bay Packers in 1963, where he played an important role as "super sub" to starter Bart Starr in winning three straight NFL championships in 1965–'66–'67; and Bobby Layne quarterbacked the Detroit Lions to three NFL championship games between 1952 and 1954, winning two.

While Halas was in the Navy, the Bears won another title in 1943 under Hunk Anderson and Luke Johnsos. Returning to the field in 1946, he coached the club for a third decade, again winning a title in his first year back as coach. That same year, Halas met with the Army Chief of Staff, General Dwight Eisenhower, the Navy Chief of Staff, Admiral Chester Nimitz, and the Air Force Chief of Staff, General Carl Spaatz, and offered to set up an annual charity football game, with the Bears as hosts, whose proceeds would go to the relief agencies of the armed forces. By mid-1957, proceeds from this game were $438,350.76 and proceeds from all games the Bears participated in between 1946 and 1957 were over $2 million.

After a brief break in 1956–57, he returned as head coach for a final decade from 1958 to 1967. Despite winning his sixth and last league title in 1963, he did not enjoy the same success as he had before the war, and he officially retired on May 27, 1968. He did win his 200th game in 1950 and his 300th game in 1965, becoming the first coach to reach both milestones. His six NFL Championships as a head coach is tied for the most all time with Green Bay's Curly Lambeau and later, New England's Bill Belichick. In 40 years as a coach, he endured only six losing seasons, three of which came during his final stint.

=== Newark Bears / Bombers ===
In 1939, Halas followed Tim Mara's footsteps who purchased the Stapleton Buffaloes in 1937 and obtained the rights to a former NFL club Newark Tornadoes (now in the American Association) from Piggy Simandl, changed the team's name to Bears and stocked with talent that did not make the Chicago roster. He used the club to incubate talent and for easy return for injured players, thus making it pro football's first true farm team. Newark's most notable names included Joe Zeller as coach and Gene Ronzani who led them to the 1939 championship (with a little help in the playoff from Sid Luckman). Halas folded the team in 1941, after the Japanese attack on Pearl Harbor ushered in the United States’ participation in World War II. It would later be revived for one more season (1946) as the Newark Bombers under Halas ownership (not as a farm team), but was folded altogether at the end of the season, and was substituted by the Bloomfield Cardinals.

=== Akron Bears ===
In 1946, after he returned from service in World War II, Halas also launched the Akron Bears of the American Football League as the Chicago Bears' minor league affiliate. The launch was an attempt to interfere with the territorial rights of the Cleveland Browns, a team in the NFL rival All-America Football Conference (AAFC); Akron is located just 30 miles from Cleveland.

The team was coached again by Ronzani and had notable players like quarterback George Gulyanics, Ed Ecker, Lloyd Reese, Raymond Schumacher and Jack Karwales. The Bears were successful on the field—including reaching the league final before losing 14–13 to the Jersey City Giants—but lost at the box office a sum of $52,000, partly because they had large traveling expenses as most of the league team were located on the East Coast. The team did not return for a second season.

=== Legacy ===
A pioneer both on and off the field, Halas made the Bears the first team to hold daily practice sessions, to analyze film of opponents to find weaknesses and means of attack, place assistant coaches in the press box during games, place tarp on the field, publish a club newspaper, and to broadcast games by radio. He also offered to share the team's substantial television income with teams in smaller cities, firmly believing that what was good for the league would ultimately benefit his own team. A firm disciplinarian, Halas maintained complete control of his team and did not tolerate disobedience and insubordination by players. He also insisted on absolute integrity and honesty in management, believing that a handshake was sufficient to finalize a deal; few, if any, intermediaries were necessary.

Halas's career ledger reads as follows: 63 years as an owner, 40 as a coach, 324 wins, and 8 NFL titles as a coach or owner. His 324 victories as a head coach stood as an NFL record for nearly three decades until 1993 when Don Shula broke the record with his 325th win. Halas's 324 wins are still far and away the most in Bears history; they are three times that of runner-up Mike Ditka. He was a charter member of the Pro Football Hall of Fame in 1963.

Halas was instrumental in setting up the Brian Piccolo Cancer Research Fund. Halas had secretly paid for all of Brian Piccolo's medical bills when he was receiving cancer treatment. Halas also secretly set up college funds for all 3 of Piccolo's daughters. After Piccolo's death, Halas negotiated with the bank to allow Piccolo's wife Joy to keep the house in which they lived. Halas `once asked NFL Commissioner Pete Rozelle if he could bet on the Chicago Bears to win the Super Bowl, with all winnings going to 3 different cancer funds, including the Brian Piccolo Cancer Research Fund. Rozelle denied the request.

=== Honors ===
In both 1963 and 1965, Halas was selected by The Sporting News, the AP and the UPI as the NFL Coach of the Year. In 1997, he was featured on a U.S. postage stamp as one of the legendary coaches of football. He has been recognized by ESPN as one of the ten most influential people in sports in the 20th century, and as one of the greatest coaches. In 1993, Miami Dolphins coach Don Shula finally surpassed Halas' victory total. From the 1984 season onward to this day, the jerseys of the Chicago Bears bear the initials "GSH" on their upper left sleeves in commemoration of Halas. In 1956, Halas was awarded the Navy Distinguished Public Service Award, which is the Navy's highest civilian award.

There are two extant awards named for Halas: the George Halas Trophy (awarded by the NFL to the National Football Conference champion) and the George S. Halas Courage Award (Pro Football Writers Association). From 1966 to 1996, a George Halas Trophy was also awarded to the NFL defensive player of the year by the Newspaper Enterprise Association. The Chicago Bears retired number 7 in his honor, and the Pro Football Hall of Fame is located on George Halas Drive.

The University of Illinois at Urbana–Champaign inducted Halas into the Engineering Hall of Fame in 2016.

The Bears erected a statue and marker dedicated to Halas in 2019 near the south entrance to Soldier Field.

== Basketball career ==
=== Chicago Bruins ===
In 1925, Halas tipped his hand in pro basketball when he helped to create the first professional basketball league in the United States – the American Basketball League – as the owner of the Chicago Bruins. The team played six seasons before folding following the 1930–31 season because of the Great Depression.

The Bruins struggled during their existence, failing to reach the playoffs in every season, but featured several notable names, including two Hall of Famers in player-coach Honey Russell and Nat Holman who played for half a season in 1926. Other notable players included Bears quarterback Laurie Walquist, Robert J. Dunne, Slim Shoun and Chicago Cardinals back Ike Mahoney.

Halas revived the team for four more seasons, 1939 to 1942, and played in the National Basketball League (NBL) and in the World Professional Basketball Tournament. The Bruins were more successful this time, reaching the World Professional Basketball Tournament finals in 1940, losing to the Harlem Globetrotters 31–29. Notable players were Wibs Kautz, Bill Hapac and Ralph Vaughn. In their second incarnation, the team played in the Chicago Coliseum.

== Military career ==
Halas served as an ensign in the United States Navy during World War I.

Halas entered the United States Navy again after the advent of World War II in 1942, with the rank of lieutenant commander. He served overseas for 20 months under the command of Admiral Chester Nimitz. His duties were supporting the welfare and recreational activities of the Seventh Fleet. He was awarded the Bronze Star during his recall and was released from duty in 1946 with the rank of captain.

== Later life after football ==
After the 1967 season, Halas—then the oldest coach in league history—retired as coach. He continued as the team's principal owner for the rest of his life. Although he nominally ceded the general manager's post to son and heir apparent George "Mugs" Halas, Jr. in 1963, he continued to make the franchise's football decisions until hiring Jim Finks as general manager in 1974. He continued to take an active role in team operations until his death. He was honored in 1970 and 1980 as the only person involved in the league throughout its first 50 and 60 years of existence. One of Halas's final significant ownership acts was to hire Mike Ditka as head coach in 1982 (Ditka had been a Bears player in the 1960s). He had won 6 NFL championships before retiring.

In the 1971 made-for-television film Brian's Song, about the friendship between Chicago Bears players Brian Piccolo and Gale Sayers, Halas was portrayed by Jack Warden, who won an Emmy Award for his performance.

== Death ==
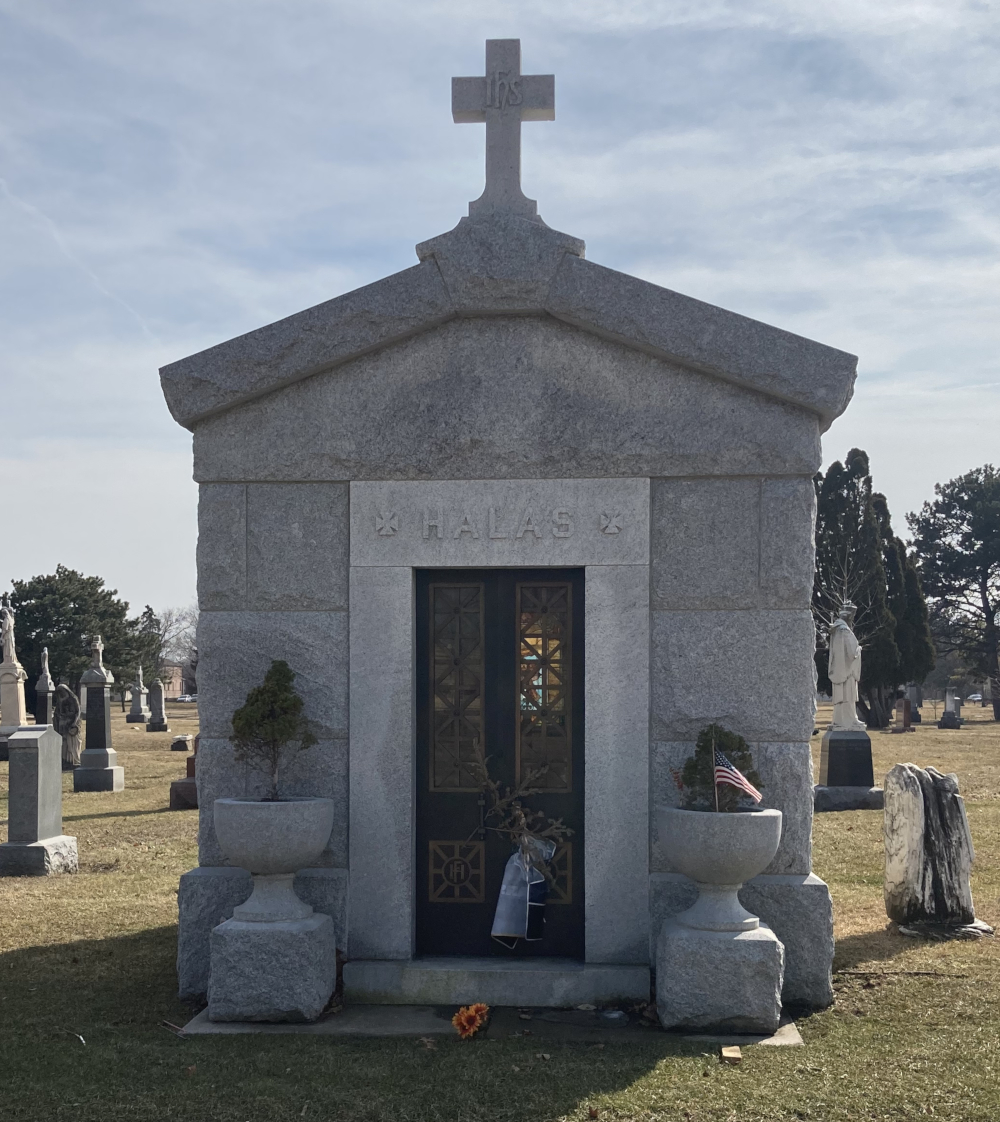
Halas mausoleum at St. Adalbert Cemetery

Halas died of pancreatic cancer in Chicago on October 31, 1983, at age 88, and is entombed in St. Adalbert Catholic Cemetery in Niles, Illinois. At the time of his death, he was the last surviving participant of the meeting that formed the NFL in 1920.

His son, Mugs, had been president and heir apparent of the Bears from 1963 until his sudden death in 1979 at the age of 54. Thus, his eldest daughter, Virginia Halas McCaskey, succeeded her father as principal owner upon his death. Virginia was empowered to vote her children and grandchildren's shares, allowing her to control the team until her own death in 2025. Her son Michael McCaskey served as team president from 1983 to 1999 at which time the elder McCaskey was forced to fire her own son. In the 1985 season when the Bears won their only Super Bowl (and post-merger NFL championship), they recorded a song called "Super Bowl Shuffle." In the song, backup quarterback Steve Fuller rhymes "Bring on Atlanta, Bring on Dallas / This is for Mike [then-current coach Mike Ditka] and Papa Bear Halas."

Super Bowl XVIII was dedicated to Halas. The pregame ceremonies featured a moment of silence and the ceremonial coin toss by former Chicago Bear Bronko Nagurski, the latter of which was previously performed by Halas for Super Bowl XIII. The missing-man formation over Tampa Stadium, performed by airplanes from MacDill Air Force Base in Tampa, Florida at the conclusion of Barry Manilow's performance of the National Anthem, was also presented in tribute to Halas.

== Head coaching record ==
| Team | Year | Regular season | | | | | Postseason | | | |
| Team | Year | Won | Lost | Ties | Win % | Finish | Won | Lost | Win % | Result |
|---|---|---|---|---|---|---|---|---|---|---|
| DEC | 1920 | 10 | 1 | 2 | .909 | 2nd in APFA | – | – | – | Lost challenge to Akron Pros |
| CHI | 1921 | 9 | 1 | 1 | .900 | 1st in APFA | – | – | – | NFL Champions on tiebreaker over Buffalo All-Americans. |
| CHI | 1922 | 9 | 3 | 0 | .750 | 2nd in NFL | – | – | – | – |
| CHI | 1923 | 9 | 2 | 1 | .818 | 2nd in NFL | – | – | – | – |
| CHI | 1924 | 6 | 1 | 4 | .857 | 2nd in NFL | – | – | – | Purported championship win over Cleveland Bulldogs overruled |
| CHI | 1925 | 9 | 5 | 3 | .643 | 7th in NFL | – | – | – | – |
| CHI | 1926 | 12 | 1 | 3 | .923 | 2nd in NFL | – | – | – | – |
| CHI | 1927 | 9 | 3 | 2 | .750 | 3rd in NFL | – | – | – | – |
| CHI | 1928 | 7 | 5 | 1 | .583 | 5th in NFL | – | – | – | – |
| CHI | 1929 | 4 | 9 | 2 | .308 | 9th in NFL | – | – | – | – |
| CHI | 1933 | 10 | 2 | 1 | .833 | 1st in NFL West | 1 | 0 | 1.000 | Defeated the New York Giants in 1933 NFL Championship. |
| CHI | 1934 | 13 | 0 | 0 | 1.000 | 1st in NFL West | 0 | 1 | .000 | Lost to the New York Giants in 1934 NFL Championship. |
| CHI | 1935 | 6 | 4 | 2 | .600 | 3rd in NFL West | – | – | – | – |
| CHI | 1936 | 9 | 3 | 0 | .750 | 2nd in NFL West | – | – | – | – |
| CHI | 1937 | 9 | 1 | 1 | .900 | 1st in NFL West | 0 | 1 | .000 | Lost to the Washington Redskins in 1937 NFL Championship. |
| CHI | 1938 | 6 | 5 | 0 | .545 | 3rd in NFL West | – | – | – | – |
| CHI | 1939 | 8 | 3 | 0 | .727 | 2nd in NFL West | – | – | – | – |
| CHI | 1940 | 8 | 3 | 0 | .727 | 1st in NFL West | 1 | 0 | 1.000 | Defeated the Washington Redskins in 1940 NFL Championship. |
| CHI | 1941 | 10 | 1 | 0 | .909 | 1st in NFL West | 2 | 0 | 1.000 | Defeated the New York Giants in 1941 NFL Championship. |
| CHI | 1942 | 11 | 0 | 0 | 1.000 | 1st in NFL West | 0 | 1 | .000 | Lost to the Washington Redskins in 1942 NFL Championship. |
| CHI | 1946 | 8 | 2 | 1 | .800 | 1st in NFL West | 1 | 0 | 1.000 | Defeated the New York Giants in 1946 NFL Championship. |
| CHI | 1947 | 8 | 4 | 0 | .667 | 2nd in NFL West | – | – | – | – |
| CHI | 1948 | 10 | 2 | 0 | .833 | 2nd in NFL West | – | – | – | – |
| CHI | 1949 | 9 | 3 | 0 | .750 | 2nd in NFL West | – | – | – | – |
| CHI | 1950 | 9 | 3 | 0 | .750 | 1st in NFL National | 0 | 1 | .000 | Lost to the Los Angeles Rams in conference playoff game. |
| CHI | 1951 | 7 | 5 | 0 | .583 | 4th in NFL National | – | – | – | – |
| CHI | 1952 | 5 | 7 | 0 | .417 | 5th in NFL National | – | – | – | – |
| CHI | 1953 | 3 | 8 | 1 | .273 | 4th in NFL West | – | – | – | – |
| CHI | 1954 | 8 | 4 | 0 | .667 | 2nd in NFL West | – | – | – | – |
| CHI | 1955 | 8 | 4 | 0 | .667 | 2nd in NFL West | – | – | – | – |
| CHI | 1958 | 8 | 4 | 0 | .667 | 2nd in NFL West | – | – | – | – |
| CHI | 1959 | 8 | 4 | 0 | .667 | 2nd in NFL West | – | – | – | – |
| CHI | 1960 | 5 | 6 | 1 | .455 | 5th in NFL West | – | – | – | – |
| CHI | 1961 | 8 | 6 | 0 | .571 | 3rd in NFL West | – | – | – | – |
| CHI | 1962 | 9 | 5 | 0 | .643 | 3rd in NFL West | – | – | – | – |
| CHI | 1963 | 11 | 1 | 2 | .917 | 1st in NFL West | 1 | 0 | 1.000 | Defeated the New York Giants in 1963 NFL Championship. |
| CHI | 1964 | 5 | 9 | 0 | .357 | 6th in NFL West | – | – | – | – |
| CHI | 1965 | 9 | 5 | 0 | .643 | 3rd in NFL West | – | – | – | – |
| CHI | 1966 | 5 | 7 | 2 | .417 | 5th in NFL West | – | – | – | – |
| CHI | 1967 | 7 | 6 | 1 | .536 | 2nd in NFL Central | – | – | – | – |
| Total | | 318 | 148 | 31 | .671 | | 6 | 4 | .600 | |

== Coaching tree ==
Assistants under George Halas who became college or professional head coaches:

- George Allen: Los Angeles Rams (1966–1970), Washington Redskins (1971–1977), Chicago Blitz (1983), Arizona Wranglers (1984), Long Beach State (1990)
- Hunk Anderson: Chicago Bears as a co-head coach (1942–1945)
- Jim Dooley: Chicago Bears (1968–1971)
- Paddy Driscoll: Chicago Bears (1956–1957)
- Abe Gibron: Chicago Bears (1972–1974), Chicago Winds (1975)
- Phil Handler*
- Luke Johnsos: Chicago Bears as a co-head coach (1942–1945)
- Gene Ronzani: Green Bay Packers (1950–1953)
- Joe Stydahar*
- Bulldog Turner: New York Titans (1962)
- George Wilson: Detroit Lions (1957–1964), Miami Dolphins (1966–1969)

== See also ==
- List of NFL head coach wins leaders
