= 1918 League Island Marines football team =

American college football season

1918 League Island Marines football
- Conference: Independent
- Record: 7–1
- Head coach: Byron W. Dickson (1st season)

1918 military service football records
	Conf.			Overall
Team	W	L	T	W		L		T
Camp Greenleaf		–		9	–	0	–	0
Chicago Naval Reserve		–		7	–	0	–	0
Mare Island Marines		–		10	–	1	–	0
Great Lakes Navy		–		7	–	0	–	2
League Island Marines		–		7	–	1	–	0
Cleveland Naval Reserve		–		5	–	1	–	0
Camp Hancock		–		4	–	1	–	2
Camp Upton		–		4	–	1	–	2
Camp Taylor		–		3	–	1	–	1
Camp Lewis		–		7	–	2	–	0
Camp Devens		–		4	–	2	–	0
Mather Field		–		2	–	1	–	0
Camp Dodge		–		2	–	1	–	1
Camp Grant		–		3	–	3	–	0
Camp Dix		–		1	–	2	–	2
Camp Gordon		–		2	–	4	–	0
Camp Perry		–		2	–	4	–	0
Georgia Eleventh Cavalry		–		0	–	1	–	0
Mineola Aviation Station		–		0	–	3	–	0

The 1918 League Island Marines football team represented the United States Marine Corps stationed at the League Island Navy Yard in Philadelphia during the 1918 college football season. The team was coached by Byron W. Dickson. A game scheduled for October 19 against Villanova was cancelled due to Spanish flu quarantine.

The 1919 edition of the Spalding's Official Foot Ball Guide indicates that Dickson coached a Marine team that disbanded after beating Penn on October 26, and afterward, a League Island Navy Yard team was formed, which went 6–0 beginning with a victory over Lehigh on November 2. Contemporary newspapers accounts do not appear to make a distinction between the two teams.

== Schedule ==
Date	Opponent	Site	Result	Attendance	Source
October 12	at Lehigh	Bethlehem, PA	L 0–6		
October 26	at Penn	Franklin Field; Philadelphia, PA	W 7–0	2,500	
November 2	at Lehigh	Bethlehem, PA	W 14–3		
November 9	at Swarthmore	Swarthmore, PA	W 6–2		
November 16	Brown	Franklin Field; Philadelphia, PA	W 21–7		
November 23	at Georgetown	Georgetown Field; Washington, DC	W 34–7		
November 30	Charleston Navy Yard	Franklin Field; Philadelphia, PA	W 27–7		
December 7	Camp Hancock	Franklin Field; Philadelphia, PA	W 13–6	12,000	
