= 1918 Camp Zachary Taylor football team =

American college football season

1918 Camp Zachary Taylor football
- Conference: Independent
- Record: 3–1–1
- Head coach: Paul J. Davis (1st season)
- Home stadium: Eclipse Park

1918 military service football records
	Conf.			Overall
Team	W	L	T	W		L		T
Camp Greenleaf		–		9	–	0	–	0
Chicago Naval Reserve		–		7	–	0	–	0
Mare Island Marines		–		10	–	1	–	0
Great Lakes Navy		–		7	–	0	–	2
League Island Marines		–		7	–	1	–	0
Cleveland Naval Reserve		–		5	–	1	–	0
Camp Hancock		–		4	–	1	–	2
Camp Upton		–		4	–	1	–	2
Camp Taylor		–		3	–	1	–	1
Camp Lewis		–		7	–	2	–	0
Camp Devens		–		4	–	2	–	0
Mather Field		–		2	–	1	–	0
Camp Dodge		–		2	–	1	–	1
Camp Grant		–		3	–	3	–	0
Camp Dix		–		1	–	2	–	2
Camp Gordon		–		2	–	4	–	0
Camp Perry		–		2	–	4	–	0
Georgia Eleventh Cavalry		–		0	–	1	–	0
Mineola Aviation Station		–		0	–	3	–	0

The 1918 Camp Zachary Taylor football team represented Camp Zachary Taylor during the 1918 college football season.

== Schedule ==
Date	Opponent	Site	Result	Attendance	Source
November 2	vs. Indiana	Washington Park; Indianapolis, IN	W 7–0		
November 9	at Camp Grant	Cubs park; Chicago, IL	W 12–0	8,000	
November 16	Camp Hancock	Eclipse Park; Louisville, KY	T 0–0		
November 22	at Centre	Cheek Field; Danville, KY	L 6–10		
November 28	at Camp Taylor	Eclipse Park; Louisville, KY	W 40–0		
