= 1918 Mather Field football team =

American college football season

1918 Mather Field football
- Conference: Independent
- Record: 2–1

1918 military service football records
	Conf.			Overall
Team	W	L	T	W		L		T
Camp Greenleaf		–		9	–	0	–	0
Chicago Naval Reserve		–		7	–	0	–	0
Mare Island Marines		–		10	–	1	–	0
Great Lakes Navy		–		7	–	0	–	2
League Island Marines		–		7	–	1	–	0
Cleveland Naval Reserve		–		5	–	1	–	0
Camp Hancock		–		4	–	1	–	2
Camp Upton		–		4	–	1	–	2
Camp Taylor		–		3	–	1	–	1
Camp Lewis		–		7	–	2	–	0
Camp Devens		–		4	–	2	–	0
Mather Field		–		2	–	1	–	0
Camp Dodge		–		2	–	1	–	1
Camp Grant		–		3	–	3	–	0
Camp Dix		–		1	–	2	–	2
Camp Gordon		–		2	–	4	–	0
Camp Perry		–		2	–	4	–	0
Georgia Eleventh Cavalry		–		0	–	1	–	0
Mineola Aviation Station		–		0	–	3	–	0

The 1918 Mather Field football team represented Mather Field, located near Sacramento, California, during the 1918 college football season. Former Pittsburgh back Jimmy DeHart played for Camp Mather in 1918. He also served as the coach.

The Spanish flu pandemic derailed the team's original schedule, and the team's manager had difficulty scheduling opponents after the pandemic subsided.

== Schedule ==
Date	Opponent	Site	Result	Attendance	Source
November 15	at California	California Field; Berkeley, CA	W 13–0		
November 28	Fort Baker	Sacramento, CA	W 53–6	3,000	
December 14	vs. Mare Island	California Field; Berkeley, CA	L 14–32	5,000	
