= 1918 Camp Gordon football team =

American college football season

1918 Camp Gordon football
- Conference: Independent
- Record: 2–4
- Head coach: E. J. Stewart (1st season)
- Captain: Mays

1918 military service football records
	Conf.			Overall
Team	W	L	T	W		L		T
Camp Greenleaf		–		9	–	0	–	0
Chicago Naval Reserve		–		7	–	0	–	0
Mare Island Marines		–		10	–	1	–	0
Great Lakes Navy		–		7	–	0	–	2
League Island Marines		–		7	–	1	–	0
Cleveland Naval Reserve		–		5	–	1	–	0
Camp Hancock		–		4	–	1	–	2
Camp Upton		–		4	–	1	–	2
Camp Taylor		–		3	–	1	–	1
Camp Lewis		–		7	–	2	–	0
Camp Devens		–		4	–	2	–	0
Mather Field		–		2	–	1	–	0
Camp Dodge		–		2	–	1	–	1
Camp Grant		–		3	–	3	–	0
Camp Dix		–		1	–	2	–	2
Camp Gordon		–		2	–	4	–	0
Camp Perry		–		2	–	4	–	0
Georgia Eleventh Cavalry		–		0	–	1	–	0
Mineola Aviation Station		–		0	–	3	–	0

The 1918 Camp Gordon football team represented Camp Gordon in Chamblee, Georgia, during the 1918 college football season. The team compiled a 2–3 record. Former Georgia Tech star Everett Strupper played quarterback for Camp Gordon. Red Barron starred in Gordon's loss to Tech.

== Schedule ==
Date	Opponent	Site	Result	Attendance	Source
October 12	Oglethorpe	Sage Field; Camp Gordon, GA	W 56–0	> 20,000	
October 26	at Georgia Tech	Grant Field; Atlanta, GA	L 0–28	> 12,000	
November 2	vs. Camp Hancock	Grant Field; Atlanta, GA	L 6–16		
November 9	vs. Auburn	Memorial Stadium; Columbus, GA	W 14–6	5,000	
November 23	vs. Camp Greenleaf	Ponce de Leon Park; Atlanta, GA	L 7–26	2,500	
November 28	Camp Hancock	Warren Park; Augusta, GA	L 0–7		
