= George Hoban =

American football player, coach, and official (1890–1943)

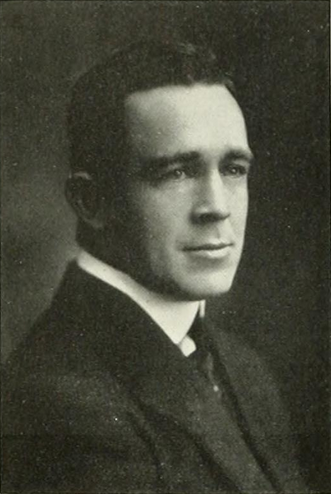
- Hoban pictured in Epitome 1916, Lehigh yearbook

Biographical details
- Born: September 27, 1890; Claremont, New Hampshire, U.S.
- Died: February 2, 1943 (aged 52); Bethlehem, Pennsylvania, U.S.

Playing career
- 1908, 1910: Dartmouth
- 1912–1914: Lehigh
- 1918: Camp Devens
- Position: Halfback

Coaching career (HC unless noted)
- 1918: Camp Devens
- 1921: Friends School of Baltimore (MD)
- 1922–1923: St. John's (MD)
- 1926–1933: Baltimore Polytechnic (MD)
- 1942: Lehigh

Head coaching record
- Overall: 17–12–4

Accomplishments and honors

Championships
- 1 Middle Three (1942)

George William Hoban (September 27, 1890 – February 2, 1943) was an American football player, coach, and official. He served as the head football coach at Lehigh University for one season in 1942, compiling a record of 5–2–1. Hoban played football there as a halfback at Lehigh from 1912 to 1914 before graduation in 1915. During World War I he coached team for the 304th Infantry Regiment and at Camp Devens. After working for Bethlehem Steel in Sparrows Point, Maryland, Hoban moved to the Friends School of Baltimore in 1921 to teach history and coach. In 1922, he moved to St. John's College in Annapolis, Maryland. Hoban died on February 2, 1943, in Bethlehem, Pennsylvania, of a heart attack while driving his car.

== Head coaching record ==
=== College ===
Year	Team	Overall	Conference	Standing	Bowl/playoffs
Camp Devens (Independent) (1918)
1918	Camp Devens	4–2			
Camp Devens:		4–2			
St. John's Johnnies (Independent) (1922–1923)
1922	St. John's	6–2–1			
1923	St. John's	0–6–1			
St. John's:		8–8–3			
Lehigh Engineers (Middle Three Conference) (1942)
1942	Lehigh	5–2–1	1–0–1	T–1st	
Lehigh:		5–2–1	1–0–1		
Total:		17–12–4			
National championship Conference title Conference division title or championship game berth
