= 1918 Camp Grant football team =

American college football season

1918 Camp Grant football
- Conference: Independent
- Record: 3–3
- Head coach: Lewis Omer (1st season)

1918 military service football records
| | Conf. | | | Overall |
| Team | W | L | T | W | | L | | T |
|---|---|---|---|---|---|---|---|---|
| Camp Greenleaf | | – | | 9 | – | 0 | – | 0 |
| Chicago Naval Reserve | | – | | 7 | – | 0 | – | 0 |
| Mare Island Marines | | – | | 10 | – | 1 | – | 0 |
| Great Lakes Navy | | – | | 7 | – | 0 | – | 2 |
| League Island Marines | | – | | 7 | – | 1 | – | 0 |
| Cleveland Naval Reserve | | – | | 5 | – | 1 | – | 0 |
| Camp Hancock | | – | | 4 | – | 1 | – | 2 |
| Camp Upton | | – | | 4 | – | 1 | – | 2 |
| Camp Taylor | | – | | 3 | – | 1 | – | 1 |
| Camp Lewis | | – | | 7 | – | 2 | – | 0 |
| Camp Devens | | – | | 4 | – | 2 | – | 0 |
| Mather Field | | – | | 2 | – | 1 | – | 0 |
| Camp Dodge | | – | | 2 | – | 1 | – | 1 |
| Camp Grant | | – | | 3 | – | 3 | – | 0 |
| Camp Dix | | – | | 1 | – | 2 | – | 2 |
| Camp Gordon | | – | | 2 | – | 4 | – | 0 |
| Camp Perry | | – | | 2 | – | 4 | – | 0 |
| Georgia Eleventh Cavalry | | – | | 0 | – | 1 | – | 0 |
| Mineola Aviation Station | | – | | 0 | – | 3 | – | 0 |

The 1918 Camp Grant football team represented Camp Grant near Rockford, Illinois, during the 1918 college football season. The team compiled a 3–3 record.

== Schedule ==
| Date | Opponent | Site | Result | Attendance | Source |
|---|---|---|---|---|---|
| October 26 | at Wisconsin | Camp Randall Stadium; Madison, WI | W 7–0 | | |
| November 2 | Fort Benjamin Harrison | Three Eyes League baseball park; Rockford, IL | W 37–7 | | |
| November 9 | vs. Camp Zachary Taylor | Cubs park; Chicago, IL | L 0–12 | 8,000 | |
| November 16 | at Fort Omaha | Omaha, NE | W 21–7 | | |
| November 23 | at Cleveland Naval Reserve | League Park; Cleveland, OH | L 6–14 | | |
| November 28 | at Chicago Naval Reserve | Comiskey Park; Chicago, IL | L 0–19 | | |
