= Jerry Jones (American football, born 1895) =

American football and baseball player and coach (1895–1938)

- Jones in 1922

Biographical details
- Born: October 9, 1895; Clyde, Kansas, U.S.
- Died: June 2, 1938 (aged 42); Rochester, Minnesota, U.S.

Playing career

Football
- 1915–1916: Notre Dame
- 1917: Columbia (IA)
- 1918: Great Lakes Navy
- 1920–1921: Decatur / Chicago Staleys
- 1922: Rock Island Independents
- 1923: Toledo Maroons
- 1924: Cleveland Bulldogs

Coaching career (HC unless noted)

Football
- 1921: Missouri (line)
- 1926: St. Xavier (line)
- 1932–1933: Columbia (IA)

Basketball
- 1932–1933: Columbia (IA)

Baseball
- 1922: Missouri

Head coaching record
- Overall: 5–8–1 (football); 9–5 (baseball)

Jerald Joseph Jones (October 9, 1895 – June 2, 1938) was an American football and baseball player and coach. He played professional football in the first years of the National Football League (NFL), from 1920 to 1924, with the Decatur/Chicago Staleys—now known as the Chicago Bears, the Rock Island Independents, the Toledo Maroons and the Cleveland Bulldogs. Prior to his professional career, Jones played at college football for the Notre Dame Fighting Irish. He was also a member of the Great Lakes Navy Bluejackets football team in 1918.

Jone served as line coach for the football team at the University of Missouri in 1921 and was the school's head baseball coach the following spring. In 1926, he worked at the line coach at St. Xavier College—now known as Xavier University—in Cincinnati. In 1932, Jones was named the head football, basketball, and track coach at Columbia College—now known as Loras College—in Dubuque, Iowa. He died on June 2, 1938, at the Mayo Clinic in Rochester, Minnesota.

== Head coaching record ==
=== Football ===
Year	Team	Overall	Conference	Standing	Bowl/playoffs
Columbia Duhawks (Iowa Conference) (1931–1932)
1931	Columbia	4–3–1	3–3	T–7th	
1932	Columbia	1–5–1	1–3–1	9th	
Columbia:		5–8–1	4–6–1		
Total:		5–8–1			
