= 1918 Cleveland Naval Reserve football team =

American college football season

1918 Cleveland Naval Reserve football
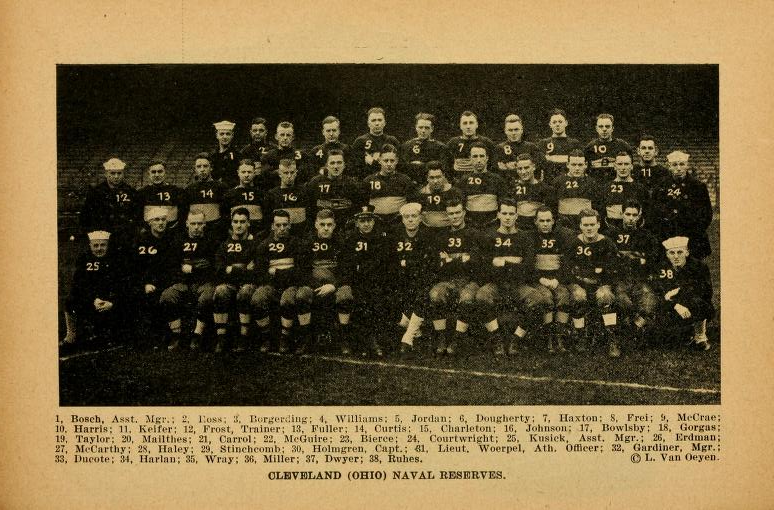
- Conference: Independent
- Record: 5–1
- Head coach: Xen C. Scott (1st season)
- Captain: Walter L. Holmgren
- Home stadium: League Park

1918 military service football records
	Conf.			Overall
Team	W	L	T	W		L		T
Camp Greenleaf		–		9	–	0	–	0
Chicago Naval Reserve		–		7	–	0	–	0
Mare Island Marines		–		10	–	1	–	0
Great Lakes Navy		–		7	–	0	–	2
League Island Marines		–		7	–	1	–	0
Cleveland Naval Reserve		–		5	–	1	–	0
Camp Hancock		–		4	–	1	–	2
Camp Upton		–		4	–	1	–	2
Camp Taylor		–		3	–	1	–	1
Camp Lewis		–		7	–	2	–	0
Camp Devens		–		4	–	2	–	0
Mather Field		–		2	–	1	–	0
Camp Dodge		–		2	–	1	–	1
Camp Grant		–		3	–	3	–	0
Camp Dix		–		1	–	2	–	2
Camp Gordon		–		2	–	4	–	0
Camp Perry		–		2	–	4	–	0
Georgia Eleventh Cavalry		–		0	–	1	–	0
Mineola Aviation Station		–		0	–	3	–	0

The 1918 Cleveland Naval Reserve football team represented the Cleveland Auxiliary Naval Reserve School during the 1918 college football season. The team compiled a 5–1 record and closed its season by upsetting national champion Pittsburgh, 10–9. The team was coached by Xen C. Scott, assisted by Bob Dawson and former Yale star Ralph Kinney.

The team was led by a backfield consisting of former Ohio State quarterback Gaylord Stinchcomb, former Minnesota halfback Walter L. Holmgren, former Georgia Tech fullback Judy Harlan, and former Auburn fullback Moon Ducote. The highlight of Auburn's previous season was its tie with Ohio State. Georgia Tech then dominated Auburn to claim the South's first national title. A game between national champion Georgia Tech and undefeated Pitt could not be scheduled, and was moved to the following season. Georgia Tech having lost several players to the War, Pitt won 32–0.

The Cleveland Naval Reserves managed to upset Pitt with a 10–9 victory. "I intercepted a pass and returned it to midfield in the fourth quarter. I felt I at least had evened up some of the losses we had at Tech" said Harlan. Pittsburgh coach Pop Warner refused to acknowledge the loss, but declared Ducote "the greatest football player I ever saw". Warner, along with some reporters covering the game, insisted Pitt was robbed by the officials who, claiming the official timekeeper's watch was broken, arbitrarily ended the first half before Pitt was able to score and then allowed the Reserves extra time in the fourth quarter to pull ahead. It was Pitt's first loss in four years, since Warner had started coaching there. Ducote had a 41-yard field goal, and Stinchcomb scored a touchdown on a pass from Ducote, and kicked the extra point.

Future basketball star Lenny Sachs was also on the team.

In an 83–0 win over Cornell's service team, Stinchcomb ran 100 yards for a touchdown. In a 14–6 win over Camp Grant, Stinchcomb was the Navy's star, kicking two extra points and returning a punt 65 yards for a touchdown. In a profile of Stinchcomb published in November 1918, one writer observed:

The reason for such optimistic predictions is the showing Stlnchcomb has made this season in the 'unofficial' football season all grid fans have enjoyed. As backfleld man for the Cleveland Naval Reserve team -- in which branch of the service Stinchcomb has been serving -- 'Pete' has romped around opposing ends -- plunged through their lines and carried his team to the fore ranks of military and naval football ratings."

== Schedule ==
Date	Opponent	Site	Result	Source
October 19	Western Reserve	Cleveland, OH	W 20–6	
November 2	Detroit Naval Reserves	League Park; Cleveland, OH	W 83–0	
November 9	Chicago Naval Reserves	League Park; Cleveland, OH	L 0–6	
November 16	Cornell service team	Cleveland, OH	W 83–0	
November 23	vs. Camp Grant	Chicago, IL	W 14–6	
November 30	Pittsburgh	League Park; Cleveland, OH	W 10–9	
