= 1918 Chicago Naval Reserve football team =

American college football season

1918 Chicago Naval Reserve football
- Conference: Independent
- Record: 7–0
- Home stadium: Weeghman Park, Comiskey Park

1918 military service football records
	Conf.			Overall
Team	W	L	T	W		L		T
Camp Greenleaf		–		9	–	0	–	0
Chicago Naval Reserve		–		7	–	0	–	0
Mare Island Marines		–		10	–	1	–	0
Great Lakes Navy		–		7	–	0	–	2
League Island Marines		–		7	–	1	–	0
Cleveland Naval Reserve		–		5	–	1	–	0
Camp Hancock		–		4	–	1	–	2
Camp Upton		–		4	–	1	–	2
Camp Taylor		–		3	–	1	–	1
Camp Lewis		–		7	–	2	–	0
Camp Devens		–		4	–	2	–	0
Mather Field		–		2	–	1	–	0
Camp Dodge		–		2	–	1	–	1
Camp Grant		–		3	–	3	–	0
Camp Dix		–		1	–	2	–	2
Camp Gordon		–		2	–	4	–	0
Camp Perry		–		2	–	4	–	0
Georgia Eleventh Cavalry		–		0	–	1	–	0
Mineola Aviation Station		–		0	–	3	–	0

The 1918 Chicago Naval Reserve football team represented the Chicago Naval Reserve School during the 1918 college football season. The Naval Reserve School was established on Chicago's Municipal Pier in June 1918. Jerry Johnson was the team's star. A game scheduled for October 19 against Notre Dame was cancelled due to influenza.

== Schedule ==
Date	Opponent	Site	Result	Attendance	Source
October 12	at Chicago	Stagg Field; Chicago, IL	W 14–7		
October 26	at Illinois	Illinois Field; Champaign, IL	W 7–0		
November 2	at Northwestern	Northwestern Field; Evanston, IL	W 25–0		
November 9	at Cleveland Naval Reserve	League Park; Cleveland, OH	W 6–0		
November 16	Camp Dodge	Weeghman Park; Chicago, IL	W 20–0		
November 23	at Minnesota	Northrop Field; Minneapolis, MN	W 20–6	5,000	
November 28	Camp Grant	Comiskey Park; Chicago, IL	W 19–0		
	Knox				
