= 1918 Camp Greenleaf football team =

American football team of the Independent Conference

1918 Camp Greenleaf football

Service champion of the East
- Conference: Independent
- Record: 9–0
- Head coach: Andrew W. Smith (1st season)

1918 military service football records
	Conf.			Overall
Team	W	L	T	W		L		T
Camp Greenleaf		–		9	–	0	–	0
Chicago Naval Reserve		–		7	–	0	–	0
Mare Island Marines		–		10	–	1	–	0
Great Lakes Navy		–		7	–	0	–	2
League Island Marines		–		7	–	1	–	0
Cleveland Naval Reserve		–		5	–	1	–	0
Camp Hancock		–		4	–	1	–	2
Camp Upton		–		4	–	1	–	2
Camp Taylor		–		3	–	1	–	1
Camp Lewis		–		7	–	2	–	0
Camp Devens		–		4	–	2	–	0
Mather Field		–		2	–	1	–	0
Camp Dodge		–		2	–	1	–	1
Camp Grant		–		3	–	3	–	0
Camp Dix		–		1	–	2	–	2
Camp Gordon		–		2	–	4	–	0
Camp Perry		–		2	–	4	–	0
Georgia Eleventh Cavalry		–		0	–	1	–	0
Mineola Aviation Station		–		0	–	3	–	0

The 1918 Camp Greenleaf football team represented Camp Greenleaf of Fort Oglethorpe during the 1918 college football season. Jock Sutherland was on the team. The team challenged Georgia Tech to a game, but Tech declined.

Andrew W. Smith was the coach until he was selected in November 1918 to serve overseas.

== Schedule ==
Date	Opponent	Site	Result	Attendance	Source
October 12	at Sewanee	McGee Field; Sewanee, TN	W 14–0		
October 19	at Vanderbilt	Dudley Field; Nashville, TN	W 6–0		
October 26	at Auburn	Drake Field; Auburn, AL	W 26–0		
November 2	Camp Hancock Ordnance	Oglethorpe Field; Fort Oglethorpe, GA	W 19–14	8,000	
November 16	at Charleston Navy	Charleston, SC	W 12–0		
November 23	vs. Camp Gordon	Ponce de Leon Park; Atlanta, GA	W 26–7	2,500	
November 28	Camp Hancock Ordnance	Oglethorpe Field; Fort Oglethorpe, GA	W 34–0		
December 7	vs. Camp Dix	Washington, DC	W 34–0		
