= Great Lakes Navy Bluejackets football =

- First season: 1918
- Last season: 1945
- Bowl record: 1–0 (1.000)

The Great Lakes Navy Bluejackets football team represented Naval Station Great Lakes, the United States Navy's boot camp located near North Chicago, Illinois, in college football.

The 1918 Great Lakes Navy Bluejackets football team compiled a 6–0–2 record, won the 1919 Rose Bowl, and featured three players (George Halas, Jimmy Conzelman, and Paddy Driscoll) who were later inducted into the Pro Football Hall of Fame. Charlie Bachman, who was later inducted into the College Football Hall of Fame as a coach, also played for the 1918 Great Lakes team. Their most famous victory came in 1943, where they stunned undefeated and #1 ranked Notre Dame 19-14. They played their final game against Notre Dame on December 1, 1945, winning in an upset 39-7 under future Pro Football Hall of Fame coach Paul Brown..
