= Emmett Keefe =

American football player (1893–1965)

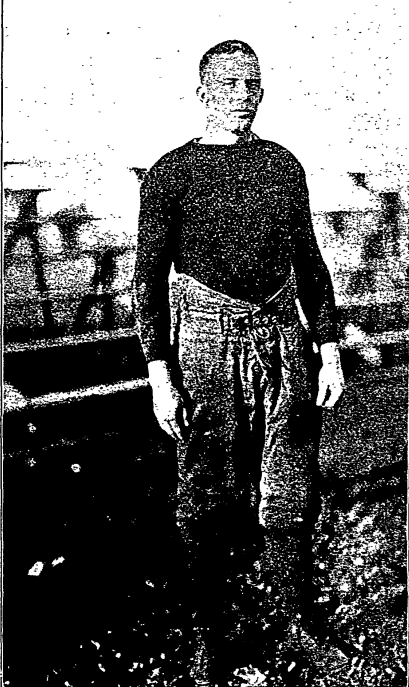
- Keefe at Notre Dame, 1915

No. 54, 42
- Position: Tackle

Personal information
- Born: April 28, 1893; Raub, Indiana, U.S.
- Died: September 11, 1965 (aged 72); Chicago, Illinois, U.S.
- Listed height: 5 ft 10 in (1.78 m)
- Listed weight: 195 lb (88 kg)

Career information
- High school: Raub (Indiana)
- College: Notre Dame

Career history
- Pine Village A.C. (1916–1917); Cincinnati Celts (1917); Hammond Clabbys (1917); Hammond All-Stars (1919); Chicago Tigers (1920); Green Bay Packers (1921); Rock Island Independents (1921–1922); Milwaukee Badgers (1922)

Career NFL statistics
- Games played: 23
- Stats at Pro Football Reference

Emmett Gerald Keefe (April 28, 1893 – September 11, 1965) was an American football player played college football for Notre Dame from 1912 to 1915 and professional football from 1916 to 1922, including three seasons in the newly-formed National Football League.

== Biography ==
Keefe was born on April 28, 1893, in Raub, Indiana. He died on September 11, 1965, at St. Luke's Hospital in Chicago, Illinois.

== Career ==
Keefe played with the Chicago Tigers during the 1920 NFL season. He would split the following season between the Rock Island Independents and the Green Bay Packers. Again the next, he would split the season, this time between the Independents and the Milwaukee Badgers.

He played at the collegiate level at the University of Notre Dame.
