= Joe Berry (second baseman) =

American baseball player (1894–1976)

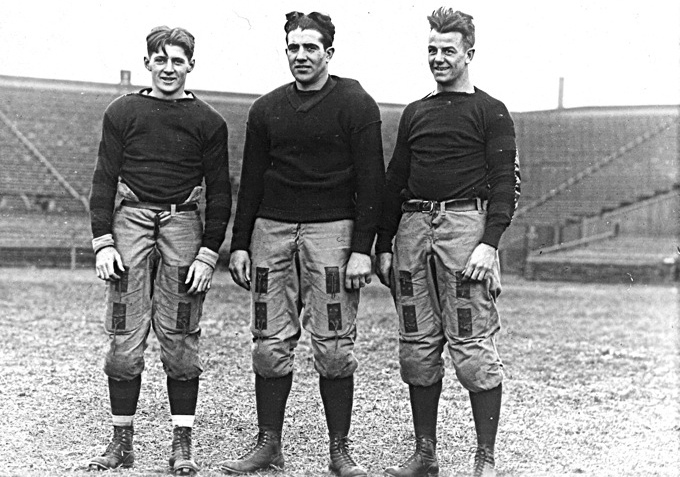
- Berry (right) with Bert Bell (left) and Ben Derr in 1916 as a member of the Penn Quakers.
- Second baseman
- Born: December 31, 1894; Philadelphia, Pennsylvania, U.S.
- Died: April 27, 1976 (aged 81); Philadelphia, Pennsylvania, U.S.
- Batted: Switch Threw: Right

MLB debut
- July 18, 1921, for the New York Giants

Last MLB appearance
- May 16, 1922, for the New York Giants

MLB statistics
- Batting average: .333
- Home runs: 0
- Runs batted in: 2
- Stats at Baseball Reference

Teams
- New York Giants (1921–1922)

Joseph Howard Berry Jr. (December 31, 1894 – April 27, 1976) was an American Major League Baseball (MLB) second baseman and pinch runner for the New York Giants from 1921 to 1922. At the University of Pennsylvania, he was an All-American football fullback and an intercollegiate pentathlon champion.

He served in the United States Army during World War I and in the United States Marine Corps as a liaison officer in the South Pacific during World War II. He retired from the Marines as a colonel.

== Early life and education ==
Berry was born on December 31, 1894, in Philadelphia, Pennsylvania. He graduated from Northeast Manual Training School. He attended Muhlenberg College for one year and transferred to the University of Pennsylvania in 1915.

Berry was an All-American fullback for the University of Pennsylvania football team in 1916 and 1917 and played in the Rose Bowl. He was an intercollegiate pentathlon champion in track and field from 1915 to 1918. He played varsity baseball for Penn in 1916 and 1917 including as team captain in 1917. In the summer of 1916, he enlisted in the United States Army and served on the Mexican border. He was back in college by the Fall of 1916 and re-enlisted in 1917 at the end of the football season. After his service during World War I, he returned to Penn and received his degree from Wharton.

== Career ==
He played parts of two seasons in Major League Baseball, 1921 and 1922, for the New York Giants. In 1921, he appeared in seven games as a second baseman. During 1922, he appeared in six games, exclusively as a pinch runner.

He worked as a property assessor for the Philadelphia Board of Revision of Taxes. He was active in the Republican Party and a supporter of veteran's organizations.

Berry's father, Joseph Howard Berry, Sr., was also a major leaguer who played for the Philadelphia Phillies in 1902.

He served in the United States Marine Corps during World War II as a liaison officer and saw combat in the South Pacific. He retired from the Marines as a colonel.

In 1964, he was elected to the National Football Foundation Hall of Fame at Rutgers University.

He died on April 27, 1976, in Philadelphia and was interred at West Laurel Hill Cemetery in Bala Cynwyd, Pennsylvania.

== See also ==
- 1916 College Football All-America Team
- List of second-generation Major League Baseball players
