= 1919 Rose Bowl =

American college football game

1919 Tournament East-West football game
- 5th Rose Bowl Game
Great Lakes Navy Bluejackets	Mare Island Marines
(6–0–2)	(10–0)
Independent	Independent
17	0
Head coach: Clarence J. McReavy	Head coach: William Henry Dietz
	1	2	3	4	Total
Great Lakes Navy	3	7	7	0	17
Mare Island	0	0	0	0	0
- Date: January 1, 1919
- Season: 1918
- Stadium: Tournament Park
- Location: Pasadena, California
- MVP: George Halas (End) – US Navy
- Attendance: 26,000

The 1919 Rose Bowl, known at the time as the Tournament East-West Football Game, was a bowl game played on January 1, 1919, at Tournament Park in Pasadena, California. It was the 5th Rose Bowl Game. With the war just over and college rosters depleted, this post-season East-West game was constructed as a military service team championship, pitting the Mare Island Marines of California and the Great Lakes Navy Bluejackets from Illinois.

== Teams ==
With college football teams depleted due to World War I, the Pasadena Tournament of Roses decided to stage the game between two top military service teams in 1919. The Marine detachment from the Mare Island Naval Base was invited for the second consecutive year, representing the West, to be pitted against the Navy team from the Naval Station Great Lakes, based in Illinois, representing the East.

The Great Lakes Bluejackets had defeated first team All-American Paul Robeson and the previously unbeaten Rutgers Queensmen at Ebbets Field by a score of 54–14, delivered shutouts of Purdue and Iowa, and fought to a scoreless tie with Notre Dame as part of their 1918 season.

For their part, the Mare Island Marines, based in Vallejo, California, had gone unbeaten through their 1918 season, registering an average margin of victory of 42 points. The Marines were handicapped to an extent by illness and injuries, however, with star backs Dick Hanley, Benton Bangs, and Bill Steers as well as lineman Nate Shanedling, hampered by influenza or physical incapacity.

== Scoring ==
	1	2	3	4	Total
Great Lakes Navy	3	7	7	0	17
Mare Island	0	0	0	0	0

Qtr.	Team	Scoring play	Score
1	GL	Driscoll 30 yard FG	GL 3–0
2	GL	Reeves 3 yard rush, Hugh Blacklock kick good	GL 10–0
3	GL	Halas 32 yard pass from Driscoll, Blacklock kick good	GL 17–0

== Game notes ==
Great Lakes quarterback Paddy Driscoll is tackled by Zimmerman of the Marines in the 1919 Rose Bowl game.

The game was played in front of an overflow crowd at Tournament Park, with fans filling the grandstand and occupying all available space behind a barrier of rails that surrounded the playing field. End zone stands were packed with soldiers, sailors, and marines, invited guests of the tournament. The Los Angeles Times estimated the overflow crowd at 26,000.

Weather during the game was ideal for football, cool with a light breeze. In the estimation of the reporter of the San Francisco Chronicle, the teams were more evenly matched than the score indicated, with the Bluejackets making somewhat surprising effective use of the forward pass, given the expectation that they would "depend on straight football for their gains."

Writing in the Los Angeles Times, William M. Henry declared that "Great Lakes won because it had Paddy Driscoll calling signals and running back punts, because Reichle and Halas, the two ends, are wonders, and because Coach McReavy had a defense against the forward pass that was too deep for the Marines to solve." The lack of quarterback and captain Dick Hanley, stricken by influenza, was a contributing factor to the Marines' loss, he opined, adding of the more or less evenly matched squads, "it was a game of football the score of which might almost as well have been reversed without changing teams."

Game MVP and future Pro Football Hall of Fame coach and Chicago Bears owner George Halas holds the Rose Bowl record for the longest non-scoring pass interception return of 77 yards. Halas would comment that he coached players to "dive across the goal" upon reaching the three-yard line, in reference to his interception failing to result in a score, and that "anyone who can't dive three yards should play Parcheesi."

There were 15 members of the Great Lakes wartime teams who played professionally during the early years of the National Football League (NFL). Three of these — Hallas, quarterback Jimmy Conzelman, and back Paddy Driscoll, would later be inducted as members of the Pro Football Hall of Fame. In addition, 10 Bluejackets went on to be college head coaches and four played Major League Baseball.

== Players ==
According to published accounts of the game, the starters and substitutes were as follows:

Great Lakes Bluejackets		—	Mare Island Marines	
Starters	Substitutes	Position	Starters	Substitutes
Reichle	L. Bernard	LE	Zimmerwald	—
Ecklund	—	LT	Budd	—
Keefe †	—	LG	Carl Lodell	Bryan
Bachman	Knight	C	Jake Risley †	—
Jones	—	RG	Mike Moran	Cosett
Hugh Blacklock	—	RT	Pike	—
George Halas	—	RE	Pat Hanley	Mohr
Paddy Driscoll	—	QB	Steers	Galloway
Erickson	Abrahamson	LHB	Adams	Blewitt + Benton Bangs + Calhoun
Eielson	Jimmy Conzelman	RHB	Glover	—
Reeves	Williams	FB	Gillis	—

† - denotes team captain
