= Hugh Blacklock =

American football player (1893–1954)

No. 21, 12
- Position: Tackle

Personal information
- Born: January 1, 1893; East Grand Rapids, Michigan, U.S.
- Died: May 18, 1954 (aged 61); Grand Rapids, Michigan, U.S.

Career information
- High school: Grand Rapids Union
- College: Michigan State

Career history
- Decatur Staleys (1920); Chicago Staleys (1921); Chicago Bears (1922–1925); Brooklyn Lions (1926)

Awards and highlights
- 2× First-team All-Pro (1920, 1922); First-team All-Service (1918); Second-team All-Service (1917)

Career statistics
- Games played: 59
- Stats at Pro Football Reference

Hugh McNeal Blacklock (January 1, 1893 – January 9, 1954) was an American professional football player. He played college football at the tackle and fullback positions at Michigan Agricultural College from 1913 to 1916. He also played seven years in the National Football League (NFL) at the tackle, guard and center positions. He played for the Decatur Staleys, the Chicago Staleys, the Chicago Bears and the Brooklyn Lions.
