= 1918 North Carolina (SATC) football team =

American college football season

1918 North Carolina Tar Heels football
- Conference: South Atlantic Intercollegiate Athletic Association
- Record: 3–2 (0–0 SAIAA)
- Head coach: Marvin Ritch (1st season)
- Captain: Allan Gant
- Home stadium: Emerson Field

1918 South Atlantic Intercollegiate Athletic Association football standings
	Conf.					Overall
Team	W		L		T	W		L		T
VPI $	3	–	0	–	0	7	–	0	–	0
Davidson	2	–	0	–	0	2	–	1	–	1
Richmond	1	–	0	–	0	3	–	1	–	1
Maryland State	2	–	0	–	1	4	–	1	–	1
Johns Hopkins	0	–	0	–	1	0	–	0	–	1
NC State	0	–	1	–	0	1	–	3	–	0
St. John's (MD)	0	–	1	–	0	0	–	1	–	0
William & Mary	0	–	1	–	0	0	–	2	–	0
VMI	0	–	2	–	0	1	–	3	–	0
Washington and Lee	0	–	2	–	0	1	–	2	–	0
Georgetown	0	–	0	–	0	3	–	2	–	0
$ – Conference champion

The 1918 North Carolina SATC football team informally represented the University of North Carolina in the 1918 college football season. The University of North Carolina (UNC) does not officially recognize these games in their record books because they were organized under the auspices of the Student Army Training Corps rather than the school itself. Because of this, no varsity letters were given for the season.

The team was coached by Marvin Ritch, a former UNC basketball and football star in 1912, and captained by Allan Gant. Like many other teams in the South, the Tar Heels' season was stymied by a series of setbacks, including the Spanish flu outbreak, and war restrictions, and did not organize until October 15; the team contained "no letter men [sic] back and only a few men of last year's freshmen team". Nonetheless, the team was able to complete a five game season, with a school paper noting that the team had "shown the old pep and spirit straight through," adding that "the team deserves the commendation of every loyal Carolina man." In light of their struggles, The Tar Heel, the University's paper, published an editorial which read "We are of the opinion that this team with the setback on account of influenza and other unavoidable reverses, has done miraculously well, and deserves to be set down with the football heroes of Carolina."

Though the season is not currently recognized by the UNC Athletics Department, evidence suggests that in the past it was given its place in team history. Smith Barrier's On Carolina's Gridiron (1937) included the season in his comprehensive study of Tar Heel football from its inception through 1936 with the note that a "Student Army Training Corps team represented [the] University" for the season, and further noted that 1917 was "The only year [North] Carolina did not have a varsity team."

== Schedule ==
Date	Time	Opponent	Site	Result	Source
November 2		Wake Forest (SATC)	Emerson Field; Chapel Hill, NC	W 13–7	
November 9		Camp Greene	Emerson Field; Chapel Hill, NC	W 52–13	
November 16	3:00 pm	vs. Davidson (SATC)	Prince Albert Park; Winston–Salem, NC	L 7–14	
November 23	3:00 pm	VPI (SATC)	Emerson Field; Chapel Hill, NC	L 7–18	
November 28		Camp Polk Officers	Emerson Field; Chapel Hill, NC	W 7–29	
All times are in Eastern time
