= List of Delaware Fightin' Blue Hens football seasons =

This is a list of seasons completed by the Delaware Fightin' Blue Hens football team of the National Collegiate Athletic Association (NCAA) Division I Football Bowl Subdivision (FBS). Since the team's creation in 1889, the Fightin' Blue Hens have participated in more than 1,100 officially sanctioned games.

For most of its existence, Delaware competed as an independent. Delaware was a member of the Mason-Dixon Conference in 1946, the Middle Atlantic Conference from 1958 to 1969, the Yankee Conference from 1986 to 1996, the Atlantic 10 Conference from 1997 to 2006, the Coastal Athletic Association from 2007 to 2024, and Conference USA starting in 2025.

== Seasons ==
National champions	Conference champions	Bowl game berth

Year	Coach	Conference	Record			Postseason	Final ranking
Year	Coach	Conference	Wins	Losses	Ties	Postseason	Final ranking
Delaware
1889	No Coach	Ind	1	1	1		—
1890	No Coach	Ind	3	2	0		—
1891	No Coach	Ind	5	3	1		—
1892	No Coach	Ind	1	2	2		—
1893	No Coach	Ind	2	1	0		—
1894	No Coach	Ind	1	1	0		—
1895	No Coach	Ind	1	3	0		—
1896	Ira Pierce	Ind	0	6	0		—
1897	Herbert Rice	Ind	2	4	0		—
1898	Herbert Rice	Ind	2	5	2		—
1899	Herbert Rice	Ind	6	2	0		—
1900	Herbert Rice	Ind	2	3	1		—
1901	Herbert Rice	Ind	5	4	0		—
1902	Clarence A. Short	Ind	3	5	1		—
1903	Nathan Mannakee	Ind	4	4	0		—
1904	Nathan Mannakee	Ind	1	5	1		—
1905	Nathan Mannakee	Ind	3	4	1		—
1906	Clarence A. Short	Ind	5	1	0		—
1907	E. Pratt King	Ind	0	5	1		—
1908	William McAvoy	Ind	3	4	1		—
1909	William McAvoy	Ind	1	6	1		—
1910	William McAvoy	Ind	1	2	2		—
Delaware Fightin' Blue Hens
1911	William McAvoy	Ind	2	5	2		—
1912	William McAvoy	Ind	1	6	1		—
1913	William McAvoy	Ind	2	4	2		—
1914	William McAvoy	Ind	7	1	1		—
1915	William McAvoy	Ind	6	3	0		—
1916	William McAvoy	Ind	4	3	1		—
1917	Stan Baumgartner	Ind	2	5	0		—
1918	Milton Aronowitz	Ind	1	2	2		—
1919	Burton Shipley	Ind	2	5	1		—
1920	Burton Shipley	Ind	3	5	1		—
1921	Sylvester Derby	Ind	5	4	0		—
1922	William McAvoy	Ind	6	3	0		—
1923	William McAvoy	Ind	5	3	1		—
1924	William McAvoy	Ind	4	3	1		—
1925	R. M. Forstburg	Ind	4	4	0		—
1926	R. M. Forstburg	Ind	3	5	0		—
1927	Joseph J. Rothrock	Ind	2	5	1		—
1928	Joseph J. Rothrock	Ind	2	6	0		—
1929	Gus Ziegler	Ind	0	7	1		—
1930	Gus Ziegler	Ind	6	3	1		—
1931	Charles Rogers	Ind	5	1	2		—
1932	Charles Rogers	Ind	5	4	0		—
1933	Charles Rogers	Ind	2	4	2		—
1934	Skip Stahley	Ind	4	3	1		—
1935	Lyal Clark	Ind	2	5	1		—
1936	Lyal Clark	Mason-Dixon	2	6	0		—
1937	Lyal Clark	Mason-Dixon	1	7	0		—
1938	Stephen Grenda	Mason-Dixon	3	5	0		—
1939	Stephen Grenda	Mason-Dixon	1	7	0		—
1940	William D. Murray	Mason-Dixon	5	3	0		—
1941	William D. Murray	Mason-Dixon	7	0	1		—
1942	William D. Murray	Mason-Dixon	8	0	0		—
1946	William D. Murray	Mason-Dixon	10	0	0	Won 1947 Cigar Bowl vs. Rollins, 21–7	19
1947	William D. Murray	Ind	4	4	0		—
1948	William D. Murray	Ind	5	3	0		—
1949	William D. Murray	Ind	8	1	0		—
1950	William D. Murray	Ind	2	5	1		—
1951	David M. Nelson	Ind	5	3	0		—
1952	David M. Nelson	Ind	4	4	0		—
1953	David M. Nelson	Ind	7	1	0		—
1954	David M. Nelson	Ind	8	2	0	Won 1954 Refrigerator Bowl vs. Kent State, 19–7	—
1955	David M. Nelson	Ind	8	1	0		—
1956	David M. Nelson	Ind	5	3	1		—
1957	David M. Nelson	Ind	4	3	0		—
1958	David M. Nelson	MAC	5	3	0		—
1959	David M. Nelson	MAC	8	1	0		—
1960	David M. Nelson	MAC	2	6	1		—
1961	David M. Nelson	MAC	4	4	0		—
1962	David M. Nelson	MAC	7	2	0		—
1963	David M. Nelson	MAC	8	0	0		—
1964	David M. Nelson	MAC	4	5	0		—
1965	David M. Nelson	MAC	5	4	0		—
1966	Tubby Raymond	MAC	6	3	0		—
1967	Tubby Raymond	MAC	2	7	0		—
1968	Tubby Raymond	MAC	8	3	0	Won 1968 Boardwalk Bowl vs. IUP, 31–24	—
1969	Tubby Raymond	MAC	9	2	0	Won 1969 Boardwalk Bowl vs. North Carolina Central, 31–13	—
1970	Tubby Raymond	Ind	9	2	0	Won 1970 Boardwalk Bowl vs. Morgan State, 38–23	—
1971	Tubby Raymond	Ind	10	1	0	Won 1971 Boardwalk Bowl vs. C.W. Post, 72–22	—
1972	Tubby Raymond	Ind	10	0	0		—
1973	Tubby Raymond	Ind	8	4	0	Lost NCAA Semifinals (1973 Boardwalk Bowl) vs. Grambling State, 8–17	—
1974	Tubby Raymond	Ind	12	2	0	Won NCAA Quarterfinals vs. Youngstown State, 35–14; Won NCAA Semifinals (Grantland Rice Bowl) vs. UNLV, 49–11; Lost NCAA Division II Championship Game (Camellia Bowl) vs. Central Michigan, 14–54	—
1975	Tubby Raymond	Ind	8	3	0		—
1976	Tubby Raymond	Ind	8	3	1	Lost NCAA Quarterfinals vs. Northern Michigan, 17–28	—
1977	Tubby Raymond	Ind	6	3	1		—
1978	Tubby Raymond	Ind	10	4	0	Won NCAA Quarterfinals vs. Jacksonville State, 42–27; Won NCAA Semifinals vs. Winston-Salem, 41–0; Lost NCAA Division II Championship Game vs. Eastern Illinois, 9–10	—
1979	Tubby Raymond	Ind	13	1	0	Won NCAA Quarterfinals vs. Virginia Union, 58–28; Won NCAA Semifinals vs. Mississippi College, 60–10; Won NCAA Division II Championship Game (Zia Bowl) vs. Youngstown State, 38–21	—
1980	Tubby Raymond	Ind	9	2	0		—
1981	Tubby Raymond	Ind	9	3	0	Lost NCAA I-AA Quarterfinals vs. Eastern Kentucky, 28–35	—
1982	Tubby Raymond	Ind	12	2	0	Won NCAA I-AA Quarterfinals vs. Colgate, 20–13; Won NCAA I-AA Semifinals vs. Louisiana Tech, 17–0; Lost NCAA Division I-AA Football Championship Game (Pioneer Bowl) vs. Eastern Kentucky, 14–17	—
1983	Tubby Raymond	Ind	4	7	0		—
1984	Tubby Raymond	Ind	8	3	0		—
1985	Tubby Raymond	Ind	7	4	0		—
1986	Tubby Raymond	Yankee	9	4	0	Won NCAA I-AA Opening Round vs. William & Mary, 51–17; Lost NCAA I-AA Quarterfinals vs. Arkansas State, 14–55	—
1987	Tubby Raymond	Yankee	5	6	0		—
1988	Tubby Raymond	Yankee	7	5	0	Lost NCAA I-AA Opening Round vs. Furman, 7–21	—
1989	Tubby Raymond	Yankee	7	4	0		—
1990	Tubby Raymond	Yankee	6	5	0		—
1991	Tubby Raymond	Yankee	10	2	0	Lost NCAA I-AA Opening Round vs. James Madison, 35–42 (2OT)	—
1992	Tubby Raymond	Yankee	11	3	0	Won NCAA I-AA Opening Round vs. Samford, 56–21; Won NCAA I-AA Quarterfinals vs. Northeast Louisiana, 41–18; Lost I-AA Semifinals vs. Marshall, 7–28	—
1993	Tubby Raymond	Yankee	9	4	0	Won NCAA I-AA Opening Round vs. Montana, 49–48; Lost NCAA I-AA Quarterfinals vs. Marshall, 31–34	—
1994	Tubby Raymond	Yankee	7	3	1		—
1995	Tubby Raymond	Yankee	11	2	0	Won NCAA I-AA Opening Round vs. Hofstra, 38–17; Lost NCAA I-AA Quarterfinals vs. McNeese State, 18–52	—
1996	Tubby Raymond	Yankee	8	4	— (Note: Overtime rules in college football were introduced in 1996, making ties impossible in the period since.)	Lost NCAA I-AA Opening Round vs. Marshall, 14–59	10
1997	Tubby Raymond	Atlantic 10	12	2	—	Won NCAA I-AA 1st Round vs. Hofstra, 24–14; Won NCAA I-AA Quarterfinals vs. Georgia Southern, 16–7; Lost NCAA I-AA Semifinal vs. McNeese State, 21–23	3
1998	Tubby Raymond	Atlantic 10	7	4	—		23
1999	Tubby Raymond	Atlantic 10	7	4	—		—
2000	Tubby Raymond	Atlantic 10	12	2	—	Won NCAA I-AA Opening Round vs. Portland State, 49–14; Won NCAA I-AA Quarterfinals vs. Lehigh, 49–22; Lost NCAA I-AA Semifinals vs. Georgia Southern, 18–27	3
2001	Tubby Raymond	Atlantic 10	4	6	—		—
2002	K. C. Keeler	Atlantic 10	6	6	—		—
2003	K. C. Keeler	Atlantic 10	15	1	—	Won NCAA I-AA Opening Round vs. Southern Illinois, 48–7; Won NCAA I-AA Quarterfinals vs. Northern Iowa, 37–7; Won NCAA I-AA Semifinals vs. Wofford; Won NCAA I-AA Championship Game vs. Colgate, 40–0	1
2004	K. C. Keeler	Atlantic 10	9	4	—	Won NCAA I-AA Opening Round vs. Lafayette, 28–14; Lost NCAA I-AA Quarterfinals vs. William & Mary, 38–44	7
2005	K. C. Keeler	Atlantic 10	6	5	—		—
2006	K. C. Keeler	Atlantic 10	5	6	—		—
2007	K. C. Keeler	CAA	11	4	—	Won NCAA I-AA Opening Round vs. Delaware State, 44–7; Won NCAA I-AA Quarterfinals vs. Northern Iowa, 39–27; Won NCAA I-AA Semifinals vs. Southern Illinois, 20–17; Lost NCAA I-AA Championship Game vs. Appalachian State, 21–49	2
2008	K. C. Keeler	CAA	4	8	—		—
2009	K. C. Keeler	CAA	6	5	—		—
2010	K. C. Keeler	CAA	12	3	—	Won NCAA FCS Second Round vs. Lehigh, 42–20; Won NCAA FCS Quarterfinals vs. New Hampshire, 16–3; Won NCAA FCS Semifinals vs. Georgia Southern, 27–10; Lost NCAA FCS Championship vs. Eastern Washington, 19–20	2
2011	K. C. Keeler	CAA	7	4	—		17
2012	K. C. Keeler	CAA	5	6	—		—
2013	Dave Brock	CAA	7	5	—		—
2014	Dave Brock	CAA	6	6	—		—
2015	Dave Brock	CAA	4	7	—		—
2016	Dave Brock; Dennis Dottin-Carter (interim) (Note: Dave Brock was fired on October 16, 2016, after posting a 2–4 record for the season. Dennis Dottin Carter took over as interim head coach, and he finished the season with a 2–3 record.)	CAA	4	7	—		—
2017	Danny Rocco	CAA	7	4	—		—
2018	Danny Rocco	CAA	7	5	—	Lost NCAA FCS First Round vs. James Madison, 6–20	24
2019	Danny Rocco	CAA	5	7	—		—
2020	Danny Rocco	CAA	7	1	—	Won NCAA FCS First Round vs. Sacred Heart, 19–10; Won NCAA FCS Quarterfinals vs. Jacksonville State, 20–14; Lost NCAA FCS Semifinals vs. South Dakota State, 3–33	5
2021	Danny Rocco	CAA	5	6	—		—
2022	Ryan Carty	CAA	8	5	—	Won NCAA FCS First Round vs. Saint Francis (PA), 56–17; Lost NCAA FCS Second Round vs. South Dakota State, 6–42	19
2023	Ryan Carty	CAA	9	4	—	Won NCAA FCS First Round vs. Lafayette, 36–34; Lost NCAA FCS Second Round vs. Montana, 19–49	10
2024	Ryan Carty	CAA	9	2	—		10
2025	Ryan Carty	CUSA	7	6	—	Won 2025 68 Ventures Bowl vs. Louisiana, 20–13	—
Total			748	491	44	(all games)	
