= 1918 VPI Gobblers football team =

American college football season

1918 VPI Gobblers football

SAIAA champion
- Conference: South Atlantic Intercollegiate Athletic Association
- Record: 7–0 (3–0 SAIAA)
- Head coach: Charles Bernier (2nd season)
- Captains: Hank Crisp; Harry Douglas Roden; William L. Younger
- Home stadium: Miles Field

1918 South Atlantic Intercollegiate Athletic Association football standings
	Conf.					Overall
Team	W		L		T	W		L		T
VPI $	3	–	0	–	0	7	–	0	–	0
Davidson	2	–	0	–	0	2	–	1	–	1
Richmond	1	–	0	–	0	3	–	1	–	1
Maryland State	2	–	0	–	1	4	–	1	–	1
Johns Hopkins	0	–	0	–	1	0	–	0	–	1
NC State	0	–	1	–	0	1	–	3	–	0
St. John's (MD)	0	–	1	–	0	0	–	1	–	0
William & Mary	0	–	1	–	0	0	–	2	–	0
VMI	0	–	2	–	0	1	–	3	–	0
Washington and Lee	0	–	2	–	0	1	–	2	–	0
Georgetown	0	–	0	–	0	3	–	2	–	0
$ – Conference champion

The 1918 VPI Gobblers football team represented Virginia Polytechnic Institute, (Note: In 1918, the official name of the university that is now commonly known as Virginia Tech was "Virginia Agricultural and Mechanical College and Polytechnic Institute". That name was not used in any newspapers of the period. "Virginia Polytechnic Institute" was used by the school, its students, and newspapers. VPI and Virginia Tech were also commonly used shortened names in newspapers.) now known as Virginia Tech, in the 1918 college football season. The 1918 team went 7–0 and claims a South Atlantic Intercollegiate Athletic Association (SAIAA) championship. It is the only team in school history that finished the season with a perfect record. (Note: The 1999 team went 11-0 in regular season play before losing the National Championship game played in the 2000 Sugar Bowl. The 1954 team went 8-0-1, with their only tie being to the William and Mary Indians)

Led by second-year head coach Charles Bernier, the team allowed only two touchdowns during its seven games. VPI's star player was Henry Crisp, a man without a right hand, who was ineligible for military service in World War I. He was voted MVP of the South Atlantic conference.

== Schedule ==
Date	Time	Opponent	Site	Result	Attendance	Source
October 19		Belmont Athletic Club*	Miles Field; Blacksburg, VA	W 30–0		
October 26		Camp Humphreys*	Miles Field; Blacksburg, VA	W 33–6		
November 2	2:30 p.m.	vs. Washington and Lee	Fair Grounds; Roanoke, VA	W 13–0		
November 9		Wake Forest*	Miles Field; Blacksburg, VA	W 25–0		
November 16		vs. NC State	League Park; Norfolk, VA	W 25–0	2,000	
November 23		at North Carolina (SATC)*	Emerson Field; Chapel Hill, NC	W 18–7		
November 28	3:00 p.m.	vs. VMI	Fair Grounds; Roanoke, VA (rivalry)	W 6–0	2,500	
*Non-conference game; All times are in Eastern time

== Before the season ==
=== World War I and the Spanish flu ===
In the summer of 1918, the United States was not only in the midst of World War I, a worldwide flu pandemic (referred to as Spanish flu) began to impact the colleges of the United States. These two factors had a significant impact on the 1918 college football season.

A huge military offensive was planned by the Allied countries in the spring of 1919, so all non-disabled men of ages 18 to 20 were scheduled to be enlisted in the fall of 1918. As an alternative, the men were offered the option of enlisting in the Student Army Training Corps, known as SATC, which would give them a chance to pursue (or continue pursuing) their educations at the same time as they participated in a 12-week war-training session. This was essentially an alternative to boot camp. The colleges were paid by the government to train the future soldiers, which enabled many of them to avoid closure. The program began on October 1, 1918. Most of the students who were potential football players were under the auspices of the War Department's SATC program.

In an early September meeting between college and War Department officials in Plattsburg, Missouri it became clear that the training regimen envisioned for the soldiers could be incompatible with participation in intercollegiate athletics. Coach Charles Bernier was one of those who successfully argued that athletics training was an important part of military training. Virginia Tech made plans to continue its football program in conjunction with the SATC program.

Notably, since VPI was an all-male military school in 1918, it did not have to make as many adjustments as other colleges which had to cooperate with the military to have football programs, or even remain open.

==== Original schedule ====
VPI originally had a nine-game schedule which was supposed to start the first weekend of October. Due to the upheaval involving the war preparations and the deaths happening in the United States due to the pandemic (being censored from the public due to national security concerns), only three of the originally scheduled games were played.

- Hampden-Sydney in Blacksburg on October 5 (team played only 3 games and is listed as having no coach)
- Emory & Henry in Blacksburg on October 12 (no record of any games played)
- Georgetown in Washington on October 19 (canceled game with Tech early in year, but played 5 games according to conference standings)
- Maryland State in College Park October 26 (played six games)
- Georgia Tech in Atlanta on November 2 (distance cited as reason for cancellation)
- Wake Forest in Blacksburg on November 9 (played on this date)
- North Carolina State in Norfolk on November 16 (played on this date)
- Roanoke in Blacksburg on November 23 (scheduled for October 19 in place of the Georgetown game, but Roanoke College did not play)
- VMI in Roanoke on November 28 (played on this date)
- Source: Spalding's Official Foot Ball Guide 1918.

==== Building a new schedule ====
VPI leaders attempted to schedule games with two groups on the dates that opened: 1) military bases, which were fielding teams of young men who were football players that were away from their home campuses or had recently graduated after playing football; and 2) college teams that had SATC programs, whose students were encouraged to participate in athletic programs along with the more traditional athletes. This not only enabled colleges to justify the inclusion of football in the SATC regimen, it also helped fill the gaps left by some of their star athletes. For instance, at VPI, one of the team captains, Monk Younger, was actually in the military in France during the season. He was captain of Hospital No. 41, but the "Techs," (the common nickname for VPI sports teams in newspapers at the time) were still referred to as "Younger's team." Washington and Lee and the University of North Carolina were in the first category. Camp Humphreys and Aero Squadron of Richmond were in the second (although the Aero Squadron of Richmond game was scheduled but never played).

VPI also attempted to schedule a game with Navy.

== Game summaries ==
=== Belmont Athletic Club ===
VPI opened the season at Miles Field with a 30–0 win over Belmont Athletic Club, an organization in Roanoke, Virginia. In the second quarter, Belmont held VPI to only one touchdown. VPI completed 9 of 16 forward passes for 157 yards.

The starting lineup for VPI was: Roden (left end), Hardwick (left tackle), Camper (left guard), Copenhaver (center), Quarles (right guard), Hitchens (right tackle), Huddle (right end), Siegel (quarterback), McCann (left halfback), Bock (right halfback), Conners (fullback). The substitutes were: Crisp and Hurst.

The starting lineup for Belmont AC was: Parker (left end), L. Hines (left tackle), C. Hines (left guard), Elby "Speck" Hinchee (center), P. Drabble (right guard), Landrum (right tackle), R. Jones (right end), H. Jones (quarterback), Meade (left halfback), R. P. "Babe" Burks (right halfback), Clowers (fullback).

=== Camp Humphreys ===
Camp A. A. Humphreys was one of the teams fielded by military bases that played against college opponents in 1918. Originally the Gobblers were scheduled to face another military team, the Aero Squadron of Richmond, but there was a change during the week before the game. Camp Humphreys was a semi-temporary cantonment built on the Belvoir peninsula in Fairfax County, Virginia in 1918. When the men on the Camp Humphreys team came to Blacksburg, they were coming from a place where over 50 men per day had been dying of the Spanish flu and related pneumonia. The flu was said to have been "conquered" by the week of the game; the number of deaths per day had fallen to 10.

VPI won the game 33–6, allowing one of the two touchdowns it allowed all year.

The starting lineup for VPI was: Hardwick (left end), Rangely (left tackle), Tilson (left guard), Resh (center), Quarles (right guard), Pierce (right tackle), Camper (right end), Hurst (quarterback), Bock (left halfback), McCann (right halfback), Crisp (fullback). The substitutes were: McConkey, Saunders, Siegel, Whitmore and Willey.

The starting lineup for Camp Humphreys was: Mealy (left end), Ketchum (left tackle), Moss (left guard), Saunders (center), Bomar (right guard), Sumers (right tackle), Stephenson (right end), Plexico (quarterback), Yeager (left halfback), Kyser (right halfback), Corizine (fullback). The substitutes were: Dudley, Fisher and Kable.

=== Washington and Lee ===
VPI vs. Washington & Lee

Team	1	2	3	4	Total
• VPI	0	0	0	13	13
W&L	0	0	0	0	0

- Date: November 2
- Location: Fair Grounds
  Roanoke, VA
- Game start: 2:30 p.m.
- Referee: Jack Gass

VPI played Washington & Lee in Roanoke for the first time since 1915. After fighting to a 0–0 draw after three quarters, Bock and Crisp each scored a touchdown as the Gobblers beat the Generals 13–0.

The starting lineup for VPI was: Hardwick (left end), Rangsley (left tackle), Tilson (left guard), Resh (center), Quarles (right guard), Pierce (right tackle), Camper (right end), Bonney (quarterback), Crocker (left halfback), McCann (right halfback), Crisp (fullback).

The starting lineup for Washington and Lee was: Frank Johnson (left end), Carter (left tackle), Woods (left guard), Dahlstrom (center), Barrow (right guard), Steele (right tackle), Leslie Fox (right end), Jesse Ball (quarterback), Bernard Arboghast (left halfback), Samuel Raines (right halfback), Joseph Silverstein (fullback).

=== Wake Forest ===
It was Wake Forest's first game of the year. VPI beat the Baptists (the nickname of the team at the time, owing to the school's affiliation with the church) by a score of either 27–0 (the school yearbook, the Bugle) or 25–0 (the Associated Press). The Gobblers ran up a three-touchdown halftime lead, and then scored once in the second half.

The starting lineup for VPI was: Hardwick (left end), Rangley (left tackle), Tilson (left guard), Resh (center), Quarles (right guard), Pierce (right tackle), Camper (right end), Bonney (quarterback), Crocker (left halfback), McCann (right halfback), Crisp (fullback). The substitutes were: Cromer, Hitchens, Huddle, Hurst, Roden, Shavers, Siegel and Whitmore.

The starting lineup for Wake Forest was: Keeler (left end), John Floyd (left tackle), Cates (left guard), Carl Bailey (center), Forrest Feezor (right guard), Felix Blanchard (right tackle), J. D. Blizzard (right end), Pace (quarterback), Harry Rabenhorst (left halfback), Fulton (right halfback). The substitutes were: Bundy and Taylor.

=== NC State ===
VPI beat NC State 25–0 in Norfolk. VPI's Crocker scored the game's first touchdown just five minutes into the game and the Gobblers never looked back.

The starting lineup for VPI was: Hardwick (left end), Rangely (left tackle), Tilson (left guard), Resh (center), Quarles (right guard), Pierce (right tackle), Camper (right end), Crisp (quarterback), Crocker (left halfback), McCann (right halfback), Bonney (fullback). The substitutes were: Hitchens, Huddle, Hurst, Seigle, Shaver and Whitmore.

The starting lineup for NC State was: Robert Brackett (left end), John Ripple (left tackle), Geddie Strickland (left guard), Robert Stacey (center), Jew Wagoner (right guard), Baker (right tackle), Tomas Park (right end), Stopes (quarterback), Shepard (left halfback), William Wearn (right halfback), Atticus Williams (fullback).

=== North Carolina SATC ===
VPI at North Carolina

Team	1	2	3	4	Total
• VPI	0	6	6	6	18
UNC	0	7	0	0	7

- Date: November 23
- Location: Emerson Field
  Chapel Hill, NC

VPI beat the North Carolina Tar Heels 18–7, but the game is not counted as official by UNC. (University of North Carolina officials did not recognize the 1918 football team as a varsity program because it was under the auspices of the SATC). VPI, who outweighed UNC by 15 pounds per man, drove to the 10-yard line in the first three minutes, but was unable to score. In the second quarter, Crisp scored a touchdown on a fake end run from the 6-yard line. UNC's Bristol had a 70-yard run soon after, to the 20-year line. A forward pass from Pharr to Fearrington resulted in a touchdown for UNC.

In the third quarter a series of passes from UNC took the Tar Heels to the 15-yard line, then Crocker intercepted a pass a ran 90 yards for the touchdown. Rangley of VPI plunged for the final score in the fourth quarter.

The starting lineup for VPI was: Roden (left end), Rangley (left tackle), Tilson (left guard), Resh (center), Quarles (right guard), Pierce (right tackle), Hardwick (right end), Crisp (quarterback), Robinson (left halfback), Maddox (right halfback), Bonney (fullback). The substitutes were: Crocker, Hitchens, Huddle, Hurst, Rice, Sharner and Whitmore.

The starting lineup for North Carolina SATC was: Gibson (left end), Allan Gant (left tackle), M. C. McQueen (left guard), A. R. McNeely (center), Nichols (right guard), Carter (right tackle), Holt (right end), Frank Lowe (quarterback), Charles Herty (left halfback), Henry Bristol (right halfback), James Fearrington (fullback). The substitutes were: Austin, Brown, L. H. Kernodle, Fred Pharr and Smith.

=== VMI ===
VPI vs. VMI

Team	1	2	3	4	Total
• VPI	0	0	6	0	6
VMI	0	0	0	0	0

- Date: November 28
- Location: Fair Grounds
  Roanoke, VA
- Game start: 3:00 p.m.
- Game attendance: 2,500
- Referee: Bob Peck

The season closed against VMI on Thanksgiving Day. The Norfolk and Western Railroad ran two special trains for VPI and VMI students to attend the game in Roanoke. Tech defeated VMI 6–0. In the third quarter, Harry Roden blocked a VMI punt at the 10-yard line. Three runs off tackle by Crisp resulted in the game's lone touchdown.

The starting lineup for VPI was: Roden (left end), Hardwick (left tackle), Tilson (left guard), Resh (center), Quarles (right guard), Pierce (right tackle), Camper (right end), Crisp (quarterback), Crocker (left halfback), Mattox (right halfback), Bonney (fullback). The substitutes were: Cromer, Hitchens, Huddle, Robinson and Whitmore.

The starting lineup for VMI was: S. Cutchins (left end), Dabney (left tackle), Sauer (left guard), Hawkins (center), J. T. Smith (right guard), R. Thomas (right tackle), Sam Mason (right end), Walker Stuart (quarterback), Honaker (left halfback), Ingram (right halfback), Richard Dickson (fullback). The substitutes were: Harrison, Marshall and P. Miller.

== After the season ==
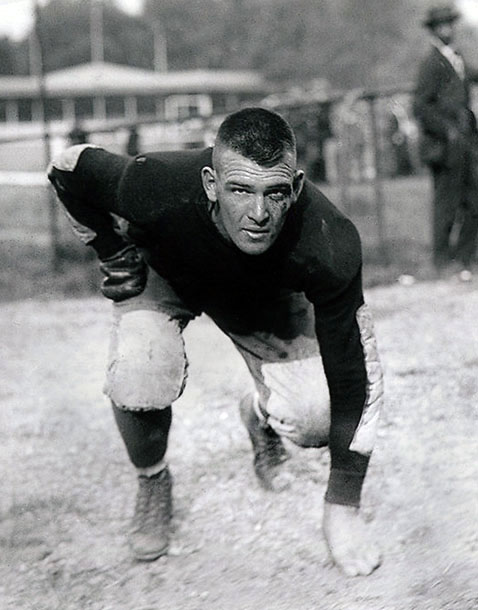
Hank Crisp was co-captain of the only Virginia Tech football team to go undefeated.

Coach Bernier wrote a story in the 1919 Walter Camp-edited Spalding Foot Ball Guide praising Crisp, one of the team's captains:

"Uncle Sam could not use a one-hand man, so Henry Crisp, much to Tech's good fortune, played the next biggest game [referring to football compared to war fighting], and to him, more than anyone else, goes the glory for a driving, consistent attack. This big fellow, playing in the back-field for the first time, literally mowed them all down..."

Crisp was also selected captain of coach Bernier's All-South Atlantic team, and was joined on that team by the Gobblers' James Hardwick (end), Walter Wrangley (tackle), and Charles Quarles (center).

== Players ==
VPI 1918 roster
Eugene Darrington Bock; Wesley Leroy Bonney; Julian Jessings Camper; Conners; John Kelly Copenhaver; Hank Crisp (Capt.); Philip Crocker; Cromer; James Thomas Hardwick; Hitchens; Huddle; William Hurst; Mattox; Harry Lee McCann; Samuel Anderson McConkey	Charles Walthall Quarles; Walter Morgan Pierce; Walter Weiss Rangely; Franklin Senatre Resh; Rice; Robinson; Harry Douglas Roden (Capt.); Saunders; Shaver; Siegel; Sumner D. Tilson; Charles Evans Whitmore; Clarke Randolph Willey; William Lee Younger (Capt.)

== Coaching and training staff ==
- Head coach: Charles A. Bernier
- Manager: Harry Luck Rosenbaum
- Assistant manager: Robert Clark Poindexter Johnson
