= Geddy =

Geddy may refer to:

- Geddy Lee, Canadian musician and lead singer for Rush
- Vernon Geddy, American college football and basketball coach
