= List of North Texas Mean Green head football coaches =

The North Texas Mean Green football team represents the University of North Texas in college football as a member of the American Conference (American) at the NCAA Division I Football Bowl Subdivision (FBS) level. The program has had 20 head coaches and three interim head coaches since it began play in 1913. Drew Svoboda is serving as interim head coach for the Mean Green's appearance in the 2025 New Mexico Bowl following the departure of former head coach Eric Morris for the vacancy at Oklahoma State after the 2025 American Conference Football Championship Game. Neal Brown will take over as head coach after the bowl game.

Odus Mitchell has the most wins and the longest tenure of any head coach in program history, compiling a record of 122–85–9 in 21 seasons, from 1946 to 1966. James W. St. Clair has highest winning percentage with a record of 20–10–2 (.656) in five seasons, from 1915 to 1919. Todd Dodge has the lowest winning percentage, tallying a mark 6–37 (.139) in four seasons, from 2007 to 2010.

== Key ==
Key to symbols in coaches list
General		Overall		Conference		Postseason (Note: Although the first Rose Bowl Game was played in 1902, it has been continuously played since the 1916 game, and is recognized as the oldest bowl game by the NCAA. "—" indicates any season prior to 1916 when postseason games were not played.)	
No.	Order of coaches (Note: A running total of the number of head coaches, with coaches who served separate tenures being counted only once. Interim head coaches are represented with "Int" and are not counted in the running total. "—" indicates the team played but either without a coach or no coach is on record. "X" indicates an interim year without play.)	GC	Games coached	CW	Conference wins	PW	Postseason wins
DC	Division championships	OW	Overall wins	CL	Conference losses	PL	Postseason losses
CC	Conference championships	OL	Overall losses	CT	Conference ties	PT	Postseason ties
NC	National championships	OT	Overall ties (Note: Overtime rules in college football were introduced in 1996, making ties impossible in the period since.)	C%	Conference winning percentage		
†	Elected to the College Football Hall of Fame	O%	Overall winning percentage (Note: When computing the win–loss percentage, a tie counts as half a win and half a loss.)				

== List of head coaches ==
List of head football coaches showing season(s) coached, overall records, conference records, postseason records, championships and selected awards (Note: Statistics correct as of the end of the 2025 NCAA Division I FBS football season.)
No.	Name	Term	GC	OW	OL	OT (Note: Overtime rules in college football were introduced in 1996, making ties impossible in the period since.)	O%	CW	CL	CT	C%	PW	PL	DC (Note: North Texas competes in the West Division of the CUSA since 2013)	CC	NC
1	J. W. Pender	1913–1914	7	3	4	0	0.429	—	—	—	—	0	0	—	—	0
2	J. W. St. Clair	1915–1919	32	20	10	2	0.656	—	—	—	—	0	0	—	—	0
3	Theron J. Fouts	1920–1924	39	23	14	2	0.615	—	—	—	—	0	0	—	—	0
4	John B. Reid	1925–1928	37	16	18	3	0.473	—	—	—	—	0	0	—	—	0
5	Jack Sisco	1929–1941	121	74	37	10	0.653	37	8	1	0.815	0	0	—	6	0
6	Lloyd Russell	1942	8	3	5	0	0.375	1	2	0	0.333	0	0	—	0	0
7	Odus Mitchell	1946–1966	216	122	85	9	0.586	37	20	1	0.647	1	2	—	10	0
8	Rod Rust	1967–1972	62	29	32	1	0.476	16	14	0	0.533	0	0	—	2	0
9	Hayden Fry^{†}	1973–1978	66	40	23	3	0.629	6	4	2	0.583	0	0	—	1	0
10	Jerry Moore^{†}	1979–1980	22	11	11	0	0.500	—	—	—	—	0	0	—	—	0
11	Bob Tyler	1981	11	2	9	0	0.182	—	—	—	—	0	0	—	—	0
12	Corky Nelson	1982–1990	101	48	52	1	0.480	24	20	1	0.544	0	3	—	1	0
13	Dennis Parker	1991–1993	33	11	21	1	0.348	7	14	0	0.333	0	0	—	0	0
14	Matt Simon	1994–1997	45	18	26	1	0.411	10	5	1	0.656	0	1	—	1	0
15	Darrell Dickey	1998–2006	106	42	64	—	0.396	31	20	—	0.608	1	3	—	4	0
16	Todd Dodge	2007–2010	43	6	37	—	0.140	3	23	—	0.115	0	0	—	0	0
Int.	Mike Canales	2010	5	2	3	—	0.400	2	2	—	0.500	0	0	—	0	0
17	Dan McCarney	2011–2015	54	22	32	—	0.407	15	19	—	0.441	1	0	0	0	0
Int.	Mike Canales	2015	7	1	6	—	0.143	1	5	—	0.167	0	0	0	0	0
18	Seth Littrell	2016–2022	88	44	44	—	0.500	32	23	—	0.582	0	5	1	0	0
Int.	Phil Bennett	2022	1	0	1	—	.000	0	0	—	–	0	1	0	0	0
19	Eric Morris	2023–2025	38	22	16	—	0.579	13	11	—	0.542	0	1	1	0	0
Int.	Drew Svoboda	2025	1	1	0	—	1.000	0	0	—	–	1	0	0	0	0
20	Neal Brown	2026–present	0	0	0	—	–	0	0	—	–	0	0	0	0	0
