= 1918 Southwest Texas State football team =

American college football season

1918 Southwest Texas State football
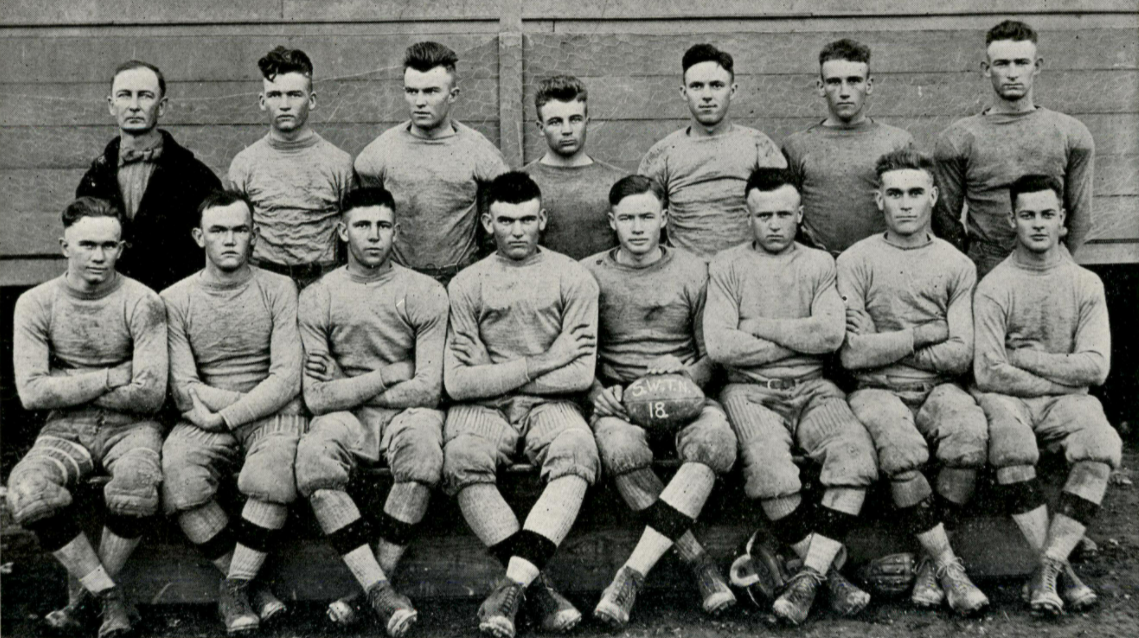
- Conference: Independent
- Record: 4–2–1
- Head coach: G. B. Marsh (3rd season)
- Captain: Squatty Williams

1918 Southern college football independents records
	Conf.			Overall
Team	W	L	T	W		L		T
Centre		–		4	–	0	–	0
Presbyterian		–		2	–	0	–	0
Navy		–		4	–	1	–	0
Kentucky		–		2	–	1	–	0
Southwest Texas State		–		4	–	2	–	1
Tennessee (SATC)		–		3	–	2	–	0
Oglethorpe		–		5	–	3	–	0
Delaware		–		1	–	2	–	2
North Texas State Normal		–		1	–	2	–	1
Wake Forest		–		1	–	2	–	0
West Tennessee State Normal		–		2	–	4	–	0
Florida		–		0	–	1	–	0

The 1918 Southwest Texas State football team was an American football team that represented Southwest Texas State Normal School—now known as Texas State University–as an independent during the 1918 college football season. Led by G. B. Marsh in his third and final year as head coach, the team finished the season with a record of 4–2–1. Squatty Williams was the team's captain.

== Schedule ==
Date	Opponent	Site	Result
October 5	Southwestern (TX)		L 0–33
October 24	Sam Houston Normal (rivalry)		W 39–0
November 2	West Texas Military Institute		L 6–12
	Peacock Military Academy		W 2–0
November 29	San Marcos Baptist Academy		W 20–0
December 4	Deaf and Dumb Institution		W 47–0
December 12	San Marcos Baptist Academy		T 6–6
	14th Cavalry		W 13–0
