= 1918 Oglethorpe Stormy Petrels football team =

American college football season

1918 Oglethorpe Stormy Petrels football
- Conference: Independent
- Record: 5–3
- Head coach: Frank B. Anderson (2nd season)
- Captain: Bob Nicholes
- Home stadium: Oglethorpe University Field

1918 Southern college football independents records
	Conf.			Overall
Team	W	L	T	W		L		T
Centre		–		4	–	0	–	0
Presbyterian		–		2	–	0	–	0
Navy		–		4	–	1	–	0
Kentucky		–		2	–	1	–	0
Southwest Texas State		–		4	–	2	–	1
Tennessee (SATC)		–		3	–	2	–	0
Oglethorpe		–		5	–	3	–	0
Delaware		–		1	–	2	–	2
North Texas State Normal		–		1	–	2	–	1
Wake Forest		–		1	–	2	–	0
West Tennessee State Normal		–		2	–	4	–	0
Florida		–		0	–	1	–	0

The 1918 Oglethorpe Stormy Petrels football team represented Oglethorpe University in American football during the 1918 college football season. The addition of a Student's Army Training Corps detachment at Oglethorpe increased enrolment significantly. This allowed Oglethorpe to field a larger team of consistently 30 boys. Oglethorpe's first large game against another college that was widely viewed by the public was played against The University of Tennessee at Chattanooga, although Oglethorpe did play Auburn University earlier that season. Despite being beaten, the Oglethorpe squad held Auburn for 8 consecutive downs in the last few minutes of the game. Oglethorpe's rematch against the Non-Coms. of Camp Gordon was much closer than the defeat earlier in the season, which Oglethorpe claims to have lost due to the unfairness of the officials. Oglethorpe won the game with a safety in the last few minutes.

== Schedule ==
Date	Opponent	Site	Result	Source
October 8	Boy's High School	Oglethorpe University Field; Atlanta, GA	W 19–0	
October 12	at Camp Gordon	Sage Field; Camp Gordon, GA	L 0–55	
October 15	Tech High School	Oglethorpe University Field; Atlanta, GA	W 21–0	
October 19	at Auburn	Drake Field; Auburn, AL	L 0–58	
November 9	at Non-Com. Camp Gordon	Sage Field; Camp Gordon, GA	L 6–13	
November 16	North Georgia	Oglethorpe University Field; Atlanta, GA	W 27–0	
November 23	Chattanooga	Grant Field; Atlanta, GA	W 39–0	
November 28	at Non-Com. Camp Gordon	Sage Field; Camp Gordon, GA	W 9–7	
