= 1918 Wake Forest Baptists football team =

American college football season

1918 Wake Forest Baptists football
- Conference: Independent
- Record: 1–2
- Head coach: Harry Rabenhorst (1st season)
- Captain: Harry Rabenhorst

1918 Southern college football independents records
	Conf.			Overall
Team	W	L	T	W		L		T
Centre		–		4	–	0	–	0
Presbyterian		–		2	–	0	–	0
Navy		–		4	–	1	–	0
Kentucky		–		2	–	1	–	0
Southwest Texas State		–		4	–	2	–	1
Tennessee (SATC)		–		3	–	2	–	0
Oglethorpe		–		5	–	3	–	0
Delaware		–		1	–	2	–	2
North Texas State Normal		–		1	–	2	–	1
Wake Forest		–		1	–	2	–	0
West Tennessee State Normal		–		2	–	4	–	0
Florida		–		0	–	1	–	0

The 1918 Wake Forest Baptists football team was an American football team that represented Wake Forest College (now known as Wake Forest University) as an independent during the 1918 college football season. In their first year under head coach Harry Rabenhorst, the team compiled a 1–2 record.

== Schedule ==
Date	Opponent	Site	Result	Source
November 9	at VPI	Miles Field; Blacksburg, VA	L 0–25	
November 16	at Washington and Lee	Wilson Field; Lexington, VA	L 12–21	
November 28	at NC State	Riddick Stadium; Raleigh, NC (rivalry)	W 21–0	
