= 1918 Tennessee (SATC) football team =

American college football season

1918 Tennessee (SATC) football
- Conference: Independent
- Record: 3–2
- Home stadium: Waite Field

1918 Southern college football independents records
	Conf.			Overall
Team	W	L	T	W		L		T
Centre		–		4	–	0	–	0
Presbyterian		–		2	–	0	–	0
Navy		–		4	–	1	–	0
Kentucky		–		2	–	1	–	0
Southwest Texas State		–		4	–	2	–	1
Tennessee (SATC)		–		3	–	2	–	0
Oglethorpe		–		5	–	3	–	0
Delaware		–		1	–	2	–	2
North Texas State Normal		–		1	–	2	–	1
Wake Forest		–		1	–	2	–	0
West Tennessee State Normal		–		2	–	4	–	0
Florida		–		0	–	1	–	0

The University of Tennessee Athletic Council, chaired by Professor Nathan Dougherty, officially suspended varsity football during the World War I years of 1917 and 1918 because the majority of the players were called into military service. In addition, Coach John R. Bender was enlisted as an instructor at Camp John Sevier in Greenville, South Carolina.

During this period without varsity football, two unofficial teams were formed from Army recruits and students. One team represented a training unit called the Fighting Mechanics and the other team represented the Student Army Training Corps (SATC).

For historical purposes, Tennessee considers these games exhibitions and does not count them toward Tennessee's all-time varsity results.

Vanderbilt's program, however, considers the game between the two schools as an official game.

== Schedule ==
Date	Opponent	Site	Result	Source
November 2	Sewanee	Waite Field; Knoxville, TN	L 0–68	
November 9	at Vanderbilt	Dudley Field; Nashville, TN (rivalry)	L 0–76	
November 16	Maryville (TN)	Waite Field; Knoxville, TN	W 19–6	
November 23	Milligan	Waite Field; Knoxville, TN	W 32–0	
November 28	Tennessee Military Institute	Waite Field; Knoxville, TN	W 46–0	
