= 1918 Florida Gators football team =

American college football season

1918 Florida Gators football
- Conference: Independent
- Record: 0–1
- Head coach: Alfred L. Buser (2nd season)
- Captain: Gordon Clemons
- Home stadium: Fleming Field

1918 Southern college football independents records
	Conf.			Overall
Team	W	L	T	W		L		T
Centre		–		4	–	0	–	0
Presbyterian		–		2	–	0	–	0
Navy		–		4	–	1	–	0
Kentucky		–		2	–	1	–	0
Southwest Texas State		–		4	–	2	–	1
Tennessee (SATC)		–		3	–	2	–	0
Oglethorpe		–		5	–	3	–	0
Delaware		–		1	–	2	–	2
North Texas State Normal		–		1	–	2	–	1
Wake Forest		–		1	–	2	–	0
West Tennessee State Normal		–		2	–	4	–	0
Florida		–		0	–	1	–	0

The 1918 Florida Gators football team under second year head coach Alfred L. Buser represented the University of Florida (UF) during the much abbreviated 1918 college football season. Like many universities across the nation, the normal operations of UF were greatly affected by World War I and the 1918 flu pandemic. Intercollegiate athletics were deemphasized, and the football season was delayed and then all but cancelled. As the UF yearbook described it, "the 1918 football season could hardly be dignified with the name", as the Gators did not play a single game against a fellow member of the Southern Intercollegiate Athletic Association or any other academic institution.

Pickup football teams fielded by Student Army Training Corps (SATC) units at the school played several exhibition games against each other and against local high school squads during the fall semester, but these are not included in official program records. The only officially recognized football game played by the Florida Gators in 1918 was a 2–14 loss to a team from Camp Johnston, a U.S. Army training installation in nearby Jacksonville. However, since no media account or records of this game have been found in university archives or contemporaneous newspapers, the accuracy of the reported location, date, and final score of the lone game of the season has been called into question.

== Schedule ==
Date	Opponent	Site	Result
October 5	Camp Johnston	Fleming Field; Gainesville, FL	L 2–14
