= Gifford Shaw =

American football coach

Biographical details
- Born: February 5, 1898
- Died: April 7, 1963 (aged 65)

Coaching career (HC unless noted)
- 1918: Presbyterian

Head coaching record
- Overall: 2–0

Gifford Wells Shaw (February 5, 1898 – April 7, 1963) was an American football coach. He served as the head football coach at Presbyterian College in Clinton, South Carolina in 1918, where he was enrolled as a student.

== Head coaching record ==
Year	Team	Overall	Conference	Standing	Bowl/playoffs
Presbyterian Blue Hose (Independent) (1918)
1918	Presbyterian	2–0			
Presbyterian:		2–0			
Total:		2–0			
