= 1918 Davidson Wildcats football team =

American college football season

1918 Davidson Wildcats football
- Conference: South Atlantic Intercollegiate Athletic Association
- Record: 2–1–1 (2–0 SAIAA)
- Head coach: Bill Fetzer (4th season)
- Home stadium: Sprunt Field

1918 South Atlantic Intercollegiate Athletic Association football standings
	Conf.					Overall
Team	W		L		T	W		L		T
VPI $	3	–	0	–	0	7	–	0	–	0
Davidson	2	–	0	–	0	2	–	1	–	1
Richmond	1	–	0	–	0	3	–	1	–	1
Maryland State	2	–	0	–	1	4	–	1	–	1
Johns Hopkins	0	–	0	–	1	0	–	0	–	1
NC State	0	–	1	–	0	1	–	3	–	0
St. John's (MD)	0	–	1	–	0	0	–	1	–	0
William & Mary	0	–	1	–	0	0	–	2	–	0
VMI	0	–	2	–	0	1	–	3	–	0
Washington and Lee	0	–	2	–	0	1	–	2	–	0
Georgetown	0	–	0	–	0	3	–	2	–	0
$ – Conference champion

The 1918 Davidson Wildcats football team was an American football team that represented the Davidson College as a member of the South Atlantic Intercollegiate Athletic Association (SAIAA) during the 1918 college football season. In their fourth year under head coach Bill Fetzer, the team compiled a 2–1–1 record.

== Schedule ==
Date	Opponent	Site	Result	Source
November 9	Washington and Lee	Sprunt Field; Davidson, NC	W 20–0	
November 16	vs. North Carolina	Prince Albert Park; Winston–Salem, NC	W 14–7	
November 23	at Camp Greene*	Wearn Field; Charlotte, NC	T 0–0	
November 28	at Clemson*	Riggs Field; Calhoun, SC	L 0–7	
*Non-conference game
