= 1918 Centre Colonels football team =

American college football season

1918 Centre Colonels football
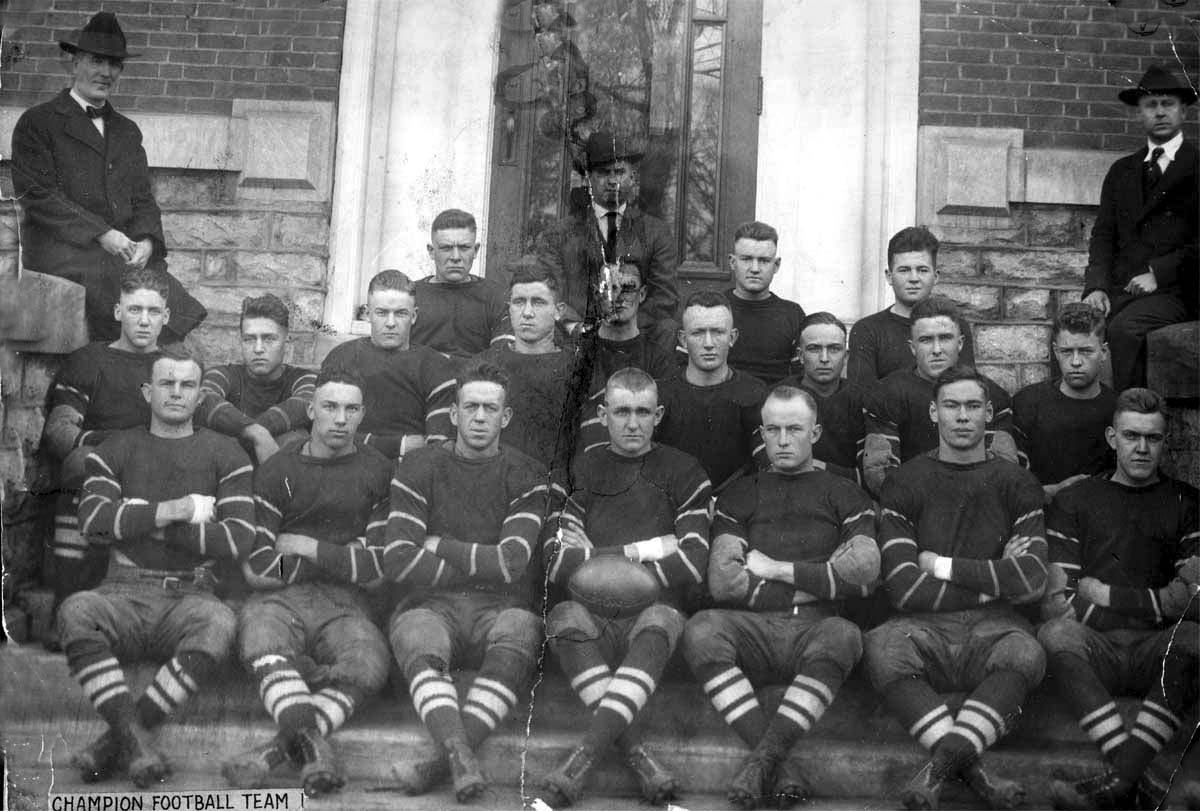
- Conference: Independent
- Record: 4–0
- Head coach: Charley Moran (2nd season)
- Assistant coach: Robert L. Myers
- Offensive scheme: Single-wing
- Captain: Matty Bell
- Home stadium: Cheek Field

1918 Southern college football independents records
	Conf.			Overall
Team	W	L	T	W		L		T
Centre		–		4	–	0	–	0
Presbyterian		–		2	–	0	–	0
Navy		–		4	–	1	–	0
Kentucky		–		2	–	1	–	0
Southwest Texas State		–		4	–	2	–	1
Tennessee (SATC)		–		3	–	2	–	0
Oglethorpe		–		5	–	3	–	0
Delaware		–		1	–	2	–	2
North Texas State Normal		–		1	–	2	–	1
Wake Forest		–		1	–	2	–	0
West Tennessee State Normal		–		2	–	4	–	0
Florida		–		0	–	1	–	0

The 1918 Centre Colonels football team represented Centre College in the 1918 college football season. The season started late due to the flu epidemic. The game on November 16 with University of Kentucky was cancelled for the same reason.

== Schedule ==
Date	Time	Opponent	Site	Result	Source
November 2	2:30 p.m.	Transylvania	Cheek Field; Danville, KY	W 44–0	
November 9		Great Lakes Military Center	Cheek Field; Danville, KY	W 23–0	
November 22		Camp Zachary Taylor	Cheek Field; Danville, KY	W 10–0	
November 28		Georgetown (KY)	Danville, KY	W 83–0	

== Personnel ==
=== Coaching staff ===
- Head coach: Charley Moran
- Assistant coach: Robert L. Myers

=== Players ===
==== Line ====
Player	Position	Games started	Hometown	Prep school	Height	Weight	Age
Matty Bell	end		Fort Worth, TX	North Side H. S.		163	19
Ashley Blevins	guard						
Ben Cregor	guard		Springfield, KY		5'11"	175	19
Bill James	tackle		Fort Worth, TX	North Side H. S.		169	20
Sully Montgomery	tackle		Fort Worth, TX	North Side H. S.	6'3"	210	17
Red Weaver	center		Fort Worth, TX	North Side H. S.	5'10"	158	20
Edwin Whitnell	end		Fulton, KY	Fulton H. S.		160	18

==== Backfield ====
Player	Position	Games started	Hometown	Prep school	Height	Weight	Age
Norris Armstrong	halfback		Fort Smith, AR	Fort Smith H. S.	5'10"	154	20
Allen Davis	halfback		Danville, KY			148	19
Bo McMillin	quarterback		Fort Worth, TX	North Side H. S.	5'9"	175	20
Red Roberts	fullback		Somerset, KY	Somerset H. S.	6'2"	193	18

==== Subs ====
Player	Position	Games started	Hometown	Prep school	Height	Weight	Age
Tom Moran	back		Nashville, TN		5'8"	175	18
Joe Murphy	back		Columbus, OH	East H. S.		130	19

==== Unlisted ====
Player
John Copper
Robert Ford
Herbert Lancaster
A. W. Price
L. W. Walker
C. L. Williams,
