= 1918 Kentucky Wildcats football team =

American college football season

1918 Kentucky Wildcats football
- Conference: Independent
- Record: 2–1
- Head coach: Thomas Andrew Gill (1st season)
- Captain: John G. Heber
- Home stadium: Stoll Field

1918 Southern college football independents records
	Conf.			Overall
Team	W	L	T	W		L		T
Centre		–		4	–	0	–	0
Presbyterian		–		2	–	0	–	0
Navy		–		4	–	1	–	0
Kentucky		–		2	–	1	–	0
Southwest Texas State		–		4	–	2	–	1
Tennessee (SATC)		–		3	–	2	–	0
Oglethorpe		–		5	–	3	–	0
Delaware		–		1	–	2	–	2
North Texas State Normal		–		1	–	2	–	1
Wake Forest		–		1	–	2	–	0
West Tennessee State Normal		–		2	–	4	–	0
Florida		–		0	–	1	–	0

The 1918 Kentucky Wildcats football team represented the University of Kentucky as an independent during the 1918 college football season. Led by first-year head coach Thomas Andrew Gill, the Wildcats compiled a record of 2–1.

== Schedule ==
Date	Opponent	Site	Result
October 5	at Indiana	Jordan Field; Bloomington, IN (rivalry)	W 24–7
November 2	at Vanderbilt	Dudley Field; Nashville, TN (rivalry)	L 0–33
November 9	at Georgetown (KY)	Georgetown, KY	W 21–3
November 30	Centre	Stoll Field; Lexington, KY (rivalry)	Cancelled
