= 1918 Presbyterian Blue Hose football team =

American college football season

1918 Presbyterian Blue Hose football
- Conference: Independent
- Record: 2–0
- Head coach: Gifford Shaw (1st season)
- Captain: S. H. Fulton

1918 Southern college football independents records
	Conf.			Overall
Team	W	L	T	W		L		T
Centre		–		4	–	0	–	0
Presbyterian		–		2	–	0	–	0
Navy		–		4	–	1	–	0
Kentucky		–		2	–	1	–	0
Southwest Texas State		–		4	–	2	–	1
Tennessee (SATC)		–		3	–	2	–	0
Oglethorpe		–		5	–	3	–	0
Delaware		–		1	–	2	–	2
North Texas State Normal		–		1	–	2	–	1
Wake Forest		–		1	–	2	–	0
West Tennessee State Normal		–		2	–	4	–	0
Florida		–		0	–	1	–	0

The 1918 Presbyterian Blue Hose football team represented Presbyterian College as an independent during the 1918 college football season. Led by Gifford Shaw in his first and only season as head coach, Presbyterian compiled a record of 2–0. The team captain was S. H. Fulton.

== Schedule ==
Date	Time	Opponent	Site	Result	Source
October 26	3:00 p.m.	Bailey Military Institute	Clinton, SC	W 26–0	
December 7	3:00 p.m.	at Furman	Greenville, SC	W 13–7	
All times are in Eastern time
