= 1918 North Texas State Normal football team =

American college football season

1918 North Texas State Normal football
- Conference: Independent
- Record: 1–2–1
- Head coach: James W. St. Clair (4th season)
- Home stadium: Eagle Field

1918 Southern college football independents records
	Conf.			Overall
Team	W	L	T	W		L		T
Centre		–		4	–	0	–	0
Presbyterian		–		2	–	0	–	0
Navy		–		4	–	1	–	0
Kentucky		–		2	–	1	–	0
Southwest Texas State		–		4	–	2	–	1
Tennessee (SATC)		–		3	–	2	–	0
Oglethorpe		–		5	–	3	–	0
Delaware		–		1	–	2	–	2
North Texas State Normal		–		1	–	2	–	1
Wake Forest		–		1	–	2	–	0
West Tennessee State Normal		–		2	–	4	–	0
Florida		–		0	–	1	–	0

The 1918 North Texas State Normal football team represented North Texas State Normal College (now known as the University of North Texas) as an independent during the 1918 college football season. Led by fourth-year head coach James W. St. Clair, the squad compiled an overall record of 1–2–1.

== Schedule ==
Date	Opponent	Site	Result	Source
November 2	Austin	Eagle Field; Denton, TX	L 7–9	
November 9	at TCU	TCU gridiron; Fort Worth, TX	L 0–39	
November 16	at Southeastern Oklahoma Normal	Normal Field; Durant, OK	T 7–7	
November 23	Decatur Baptist	Eagle Field; Denton, TX	W 27–3	
