= 1918 Navy Midshipmen football team =

American college football season

1918 Navy Midshipmen football
- Conference: Independent
- Record: 4–1
- Head coach: Gil Dobie (2nd season)
- Offensive scheme: Single-wing
- Base defense: 6–3–2
- Captain: Bill Ingram
- Home stadium: Worden Field

1918 Southern college football independents records
	Conf.			Overall
Team	W	L	T	W		L		T
Centre		–		4	–	0	–	0
Presbyterian		–		2	–	0	–	0
Navy		–		4	–	1	–	0
Kentucky		–		2	–	1	–	0
Southwest Texas State		–		4	–	2	–	1
Tennessee (SATC)		–		3	–	2	–	0
Oglethorpe		–		5	–	3	–	0
Delaware		–		1	–	2	–	2
North Texas State Normal		–		1	–	2	–	1
Wake Forest		–		1	–	2	–	0
West Tennessee State Normal		–		2	–	4	–	0
Florida		–		0	–	1	–	0

The 1918 Navy Midshipmen football team represented the United States Naval Academy during the 1918 college football season. In their second season under head coach Gil Dobie, the Midshipmen compiled a 4–1 record, shut out two opponents, and outscored all opponents by a combined score of 283 to 20.

The annual Army–Navy Game was not played during the 1918 season due to World War I.

== Schedule ==
Date	Opponent	Site	Result	Attendance	Source
October 26	Newport NTS	Worden Field; Annapolis, MD	W 47–7		
November 2	St. Helena NTS	Worden Field; Annapolis, MD	W 66–0		
November 9	Hampton Roads NTS	Worden Field; Annapolis, MD	W 37–6		
November 16	Ursinus	Worden Field; Annapolis, MD	W 127–0		
November 23	Great Lakes Navy	Worden Field; Annapolis, MD	L 6–7	> 15,000	
