= 1918 NC State Aggies football team =

American college football season

1918 NC State Aggies football
- Conference: South Atlantic Intercollegiate Athletic Association
- Record: 1–3 (0–1 SAIAA)
- Head coach: Tal Stafford (1st season)
- Home stadium: Riddick Stadium

1918 South Atlantic Intercollegiate Athletic Association football standings
	Conf.					Overall
Team	W		L		T	W		L		T
VPI $	3	–	0	–	0	7	–	0	–	0
Davidson	2	–	0	–	0	2	–	1	–	1
Richmond	1	–	0	–	0	3	–	1	–	1
Maryland State	2	–	0	–	1	4	–	1	–	1
Johns Hopkins	0	–	0	–	1	0	–	0	–	1
NC State	0	–	1	–	0	1	–	3	–	0
St. John's (MD)	0	–	1	–	0	0	–	1	–	0
William & Mary	0	–	1	–	0	0	–	2	–	0
VMI	0	–	2	–	0	1	–	3	–	0
Washington and Lee	0	–	2	–	0	1	–	2	–	0
Georgetown	0	–	0	–	0	3	–	2	–	0
$ – Conference champion

The 1918 NC State Aggies football team was an American football team that represented North Carolina College of Agriculture and Mechanic Arts (later renamed North Carolina State University) during the 1918 college football season as a member of the South Atlantic Intercollegiate Athletic Association (SAIAA). In 1918, school changed their name from North Carolina Agricultural and Mechanical University to North Carolina State University, often referred to as NC State. The 1918 season transpired against the backdrop of the United States' entry into World War I and the Spanish flu pandemic, which produced conditions deemed unsafe for football across the country, leading to a shortened season of four games, the Aggies' shortest since 1901.

Against Georgia Tech, NC State suffered its worse loss in program history, losing by a score of 128–0. Georgia Tech came into the game riding a 13-game win and 32-game unbeaten streak dating back to 1914 and had scored over 100 points in two their previous three games. NC State sophomore John Ripple earned second-team honors at the tackle position on Walter Camp's 1918 College Football All-America Team, becoming the first NC State player and first from the state of North Carolina to be selected to a College Football All-America Team. Camp attended the game against Georgia Tech and witness the only positive play of note for NC State, a 75-yard fumble recovery for a touchdown by Ripple, which was called back for an offside penalty. On the season, the Aggies were outscored 174 to 54 and lost to their only conference opponent, SAIAA champion VPI, 25–0.

== Schedule ==
Date	Opponent	Site	Result	Source
November 2	Guilford*	Riddick Stadium; Raleigh, NC	W 54–0	
November 9	at Georgia Tech*	Grant Field; Atlanta, GA	L 0–128	
November 16	vs. VPI	League Park; Norfolk, VA	L 0–25	
November 28	Wake Forest*	Riddick Stadium; Raleigh, NC (rivalry)	L 0–21	
*Non-conference game
