= 1918 West Tennessee State Normal football team =

American college football season

1918 West Tennessee State Normal football
- Conference: Independent
- Record: 2–4
- Head coach: John Childerson (1st season)
- Captain: Bethel Farnsworth
- Home stadium: Russwood Park

1918 Southern college football independents records
	Conf.			Overall
Team	W	L	T	W		L		T
Centre		–		4	–	0	–	0
Presbyterian		–		2	–	0	–	0
Navy		–		4	–	1	–	0
Kentucky		–		2	–	1	–	0
Southwest Texas State		–		4	–	2	–	1
Tennessee (SATC)		–		3	–	2	–	0
Oglethorpe		–		5	–	3	–	0
Delaware		–		1	–	2	–	2
North Texas State Normal		–		1	–	2	–	1
Wake Forest		–		1	–	2	–	0
West Tennessee State Normal		–		2	–	4	–	0
Florida		–		0	–	1	–	0

The 1918 West Tennessee State Normal football team was an American football team that represented West Tennessee State Normal School (now known as the University of Memphis) as an independent during the 1918 college football season. In their first season under head coach John Childerson, West Tennessee State Normal compiled a 2–4 record.

== Schedule ==
Date	Time	Opponent	Site	Result	Source
November 2	3:00 p.m.	Castle Heights	Russwood Park; Memphis, TN	L 6–36	
November 9	3:00 p.m.	Memphis University School	Russwood Park; Memphis, TN	L 0–11	
November 16	2:00 p.m.	Central High School	Russwood Park; Memphis, TN	L 0–30	
November 23		at Union (TN)	Jackson, TN	W 18–0 or 18–6	
November 28		at Jonesboro Aggies	Kays Field; Jonesboro, AR (rivalry)	W 37–6 or 39–6	
December 7		Central—MUS All-Stars	Russwood Park; Memphis, TN	L 7–13	
All times are in Central time
