= 1918 Delaware Fightin' Blue Hens football team =

American college football season

1918 Delaware Fightin' Blue Hens football
- Conference: Independent
- Record: 1–2–2
- Head coach: Milton Aronowitz (1st season)
- Captain: Harry W. Loose
- Home stadium: Frazer Field

1918 Southern college football independents records
	Conf.			Overall
Team	W	L	T	W		L		T
Centre		–		4	–	0	–	0
Presbyterian		–		2	–	0	–	0
Navy		–		4	–	1	–	0
Kentucky		–		2	–	1	–	0
Southwest Texas State		–		4	–	2	–	1
Tennessee (SATC)		–		3	–	2	–	0
Oglethorpe		–		5	–	3	–	0
Delaware		–		1	–	2	–	2
North Texas State Normal		–		1	–	2	–	1
Wake Forest		–		1	–	2	–	0
West Tennessee State Normal		–		2	–	4	–	0
Florida		–		0	–	1	–	0

The 1918 Delaware Fightin' Blue Hens football team was an American football team that represented Delaware College (later renamed the University of Delaware) as an independent during the 1918 college football season. In its first and only season under head coach Milton Aronowitz, the team compiled a 1–2–2 record and was outscored by a total of 44 to 19. Harry W. Loose was the team captain. The season was shortened due to travel restrictions resulting from World War I and the 1918 Spanish flu pandemic.

== Schedule ==
Date	Opponent	Site	Result	Source
October __	US Radio Training School	Frazer Field; Newark, DE	W 13–0	
November 2	Pennsylvania Military	Frazer Field; Newark, DE	T 0–0	
November 9	USS Minnesota	Frazer Field; Newark, DE	T 6–6	
November 16	at Swarthmore	Swarthmore, PA	L 0–29	
November 23	Ursinus	Frazer Field; Newark, DE	L 0–9	
