= 1918 VMI Keydets football team =

American college football season

1918 VMI Keydets football
- Conference: South Atlantic Intercollegiate Athletic Association
- Record: 1–3 (0–2 SAIAA)
- Head coach: Earl Abell (2nd season)
- Home stadium: VMI Parade Ground

1918 South Atlantic Intercollegiate Athletic Association football standings
	Conf.					Overall
Team	W		L		T	W		L		T
VPI $	3	–	0	–	0	7	–	0	–	0
Davidson	2	–	0	–	0	2	–	1	–	1
Richmond	1	–	0	–	0	3	–	1	–	1
Maryland State	2	–	0	–	1	4	–	1	–	1
Johns Hopkins	0	–	0	–	1	0	–	0	–	1
NC State	0	–	1	–	0	1	–	3	–	0
St. John's (MD)	0	–	1	–	0	0	–	1	–	0
William & Mary	0	–	1	–	0	0	–	2	–	0
VMI	0	–	2	–	0	1	–	3	–	0
Washington and Lee	0	–	2	–	0	1	–	2	–	0
Georgetown	0	–	0	–	0	3	–	2	–	0
$ – Conference champion

The 1918 VMI Keydets football team was an American football team that represented the Virginia Military Institute (VMI) during the 1918 college football season as a member of the South Atlantic Intercollegiate Athletic Association. In their second year under head coach Earl Abell, the team compiled an overall record of 1–3.

== Schedule ==
Date	Opponent	Site	Result	Source
November 2	Maryland State	VMI Parade Ground; Lexington, VA	L 6–7	
November 16	at Newport News Navy*	Norfolk, VA	L 0–41	
November 23	Gallaudet*	VMI Parade Ground; Lexington, VA	W 19–7	
November 28	vs. VPI	Fair Grounds; Roanoke, VA (rivalry)	L 0–6	
*Non-conference game
