= 1918 William & Mary Indians football team =

American college football season

1918 William & Mary Indians football
- Conference: South Atlantic Intercollegiate Athletic Association
- Record: 0–2 (0–1 SAIAA)
- Head coach: Vernon Geddy (1st season)
- Captain: None

1918 South Atlantic Intercollegiate Athletic Association football standings
	Conf.					Overall
Team	W		L		T	W		L		T
VPI $	3	–	0	–	0	7	–	0	–	0
Davidson	2	–	0	–	0	2	–	1	–	1
Richmond	1	–	0	–	0	3	–	1	–	1
Maryland State	2	–	0	–	1	4	–	1	–	1
Johns Hopkins	0	–	0	–	1	0	–	0	–	1
NC State	0	–	1	–	0	1	–	3	–	0
St. John's (MD)	0	–	1	–	0	0	–	1	–	0
William & Mary	0	–	1	–	0	0	–	2	–	0
VMI	0	–	2	–	0	1	–	3	–	0
Washington and Lee	0	–	2	–	0	1	–	2	–	0
Georgetown	0	–	0	–	0	3	–	2	–	0
$ – Conference champion

The 1918 William & Mary Indians football team represented the College of William & Mary as a member of the South Atlantic Intercollegiate Athletic Association (SAIAA) during the 1918 college football season. Led by Vernon Geddy in his first and only year as head coach, William & Mary finished the season with an overall record of 0–2 and a mark of 0–1 in SAIAA play.

== Schedule ==
Date	Opponent	Site	Result	Source
November 16	at Lynchburg*	Lynchburg, VA	L 0–13	
November 30	Richmond	Williamsburg, VA (rivalry)	L 0–7	
*Non-conference game
