= 1918 Washington and Lee Generals football team =

American college football season

1918 Washington and Lee Generals football
- Conference: South Atlantic Intercollegiate Athletic Association
- Record: 1–2 (0–2 SAIAA)
- Head coach: J. J. Fitzpatrick (1st season)
- Home stadium: Wilson Field

1918 South Atlantic Intercollegiate Athletic Association football standings
	Conf.					Overall
Team	W		L		T	W		L		T
VPI $	3	–	0	–	0	7	–	0	–	0
Davidson	2	–	0	–	0	2	–	1	–	1
Richmond	1	–	0	–	0	3	–	1	–	1
Maryland State	2	–	0	–	1	4	–	1	–	1
Johns Hopkins	0	–	0	–	1	0	–	0	–	1
NC State	0	–	1	–	0	1	–	3	–	0
St. John's (MD)	0	–	1	–	0	0	–	1	–	0
William & Mary	0	–	1	–	0	0	–	2	–	0
VMI	0	–	2	–	0	1	–	3	–	0
Washington and Lee	0	–	2	–	0	1	–	2	–	0
Georgetown	0	–	0	–	0	3	–	2	–	0
$ – Conference champion

The 1918 Washington and Lee Generals football team was an American football team that represented Washington and Lee University as a member of the South Atlantic Intercollegiate Athletic Association (SAIAA) during the 1918 college football season. In their first season under head coach J. J. Fitzpatrick, Washington and Lee compiled a 1–2 record.

== Schedule ==
Date	Opponent	Site	Result	Source
November 2	vs. VPI	Fair Grounds; Roanoke, VA	L 0–13	
November 9	at Davidson	Sprunt Field; Davidson, NC	L 0–20	
November 16	Wake Forest*	Wilson Field; Lexington, VA	W 21–12	
*Non-conference game
