= 1918 Richmond Spiders football team =

American college football season

1918 Richmond Spiders football
- Conference: South Atlantic Intercollegiate Athletic Association
- Record: 3–1–1 (1–0 SAIAA)
- Head coach: Robert C. Marshall (1st season)
- Captain: G. Keith Taylor
- Home stadium: Boulevard Field

1918 South Atlantic Intercollegiate Athletic Association football standings
	Conf.					Overall
Team	W		L		T	W		L		T
VPI $	3	–	0	–	0	7	–	0	–	0
Davidson	2	–	0	–	0	2	–	1	–	1
Richmond	1	–	0	–	0	3	–	1	–	1
Maryland State	2	–	0	–	1	4	–	1	–	1
Johns Hopkins	0	–	0	–	1	0	–	0	–	1
NC State	0	–	1	–	0	1	–	3	–	0
St. John's (MD)	0	–	1	–	0	0	–	1	–	0
William & Mary	0	–	1	–	0	0	–	2	–	0
VMI	0	–	2	–	0	1	–	3	–	0
Washington and Lee	0	–	2	–	0	1	–	2	–	0
Georgetown	0	–	0	–	0	3	–	2	–	0
$ – Conference champion

The 1918 Richmond Spiders football team was an American football team that represented Richmond College—now known as the University of Richmond—as a member of the South Atlantic Intercollegiate Athletic Association (SAIAA) during the 1918 college football season. Led by Robert C. Marshall in his first and only year as head coach, Richmond compiled an overall record of 3–1–1 with a mark of 1–0 in conference play. Richmond beat rival William & Mary, 7–0.

== Schedule ==
Date	Opponent	Site	Result	Source
November 9	Randolph–Macon	Boulevard Field; Richmond, VA	T 0–0	
November 16	Hampden–Sydney	Richmond, VA	L 0–13	
November 22	Fulton Aviators	Richmond, VA	W 7–0	
November 30	at William & Mary	Williamsburg, VA (rivalry)	W 7–0	
December 7	Randolph–Macon	Richmond, VA	W 8–6	
