= 1918 Georgetown Blue and Gray football team =

American college football season

1918 Georgetown Blue and Gray football
- Conference: South Atlantic Intercollegiate Athletic Association
- Record: 3–2 (0–0 SAIAA)
- Head coach: Albert Exendine (5th season)
- Captain: Ed Heaphy
- Home stadium: Georgetown Field

1918 South Atlantic Intercollegiate Athletic Association football standings
	Conf.					Overall
Team	W		L		T	W		L		T
VPI $	3	–	0	–	0	7	–	0	–	0
Davidson	2	–	0	–	0	2	–	1	–	1
Richmond	1	–	0	–	0	3	–	1	–	1
Maryland State	2	–	0	–	1	4	–	1	–	1
Johns Hopkins	0	–	0	–	1	0	–	0	–	1
NC State	0	–	1	–	0	1	–	3	–	0
St. John's (MD)	0	–	1	–	0	0	–	1	–	0
William & Mary	0	–	1	–	0	0	–	2	–	0
VMI	0	–	2	–	0	1	–	3	–	0
Washington and Lee	0	–	2	–	0	1	–	2	–	0
Georgetown	0	–	0	–	0	3	–	2	–	0
$ – Conference champion

The 1918 Georgetown Blue and Gray football team represented Georgetown University during the 1918 college football season. Led by Albert Exendine in his fifth year as head coach, the team went 3–2.

== Schedule ==
Date	Opponent	Site	Result	Source
November 9	Fort Myer*	Georgetown Field; Washington, DC	W 87–0	
November 13	Quantico Marines*	Georgetown Field; Washington, DC	W 81–0	
November 16	Charleston Navy Yard*	Georgetown Field; Washington, DC	W 13–0	
November 23	League Island Marines*	Georgetown Field; Washington, DC	L 7–34	
November 28	at Fordham*	Fordham Field; Bronx, NY	L 0–14	
*Non-conference game
