= Vernon Geddy =

American lawyer

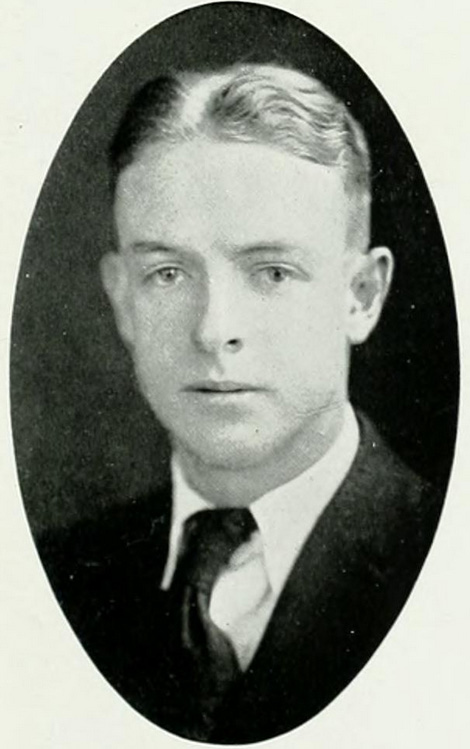
- Geddy pictured in The Colonial Echo 1919, William & Mary yearbook

Biographical details
- Born: November 11, 1897; Williamsburg, Virginia, U.S.
- Died: October 18, 1952 (aged 52); James City County, Virginia, U.S.

Coaching career (HC unless noted)

Football
- 1918: William & Mary

Basketball
- 1918–1919: William & Mary

Baseball
- 1919: William & Mary

Administrative career (AD unless noted)
- 1918–1919: William & Mary

Head coaching record
- Overall: 0–2 (football); 3–6 (basketball); 5–7 (baseball)

Vernon Meredith Geddy Sr. (November 11, 1897 – October 18, 1952) was an attorney based in Williamsburg, Virginia. He attended the College of William and Mary and the University of Virginia, and served W&M as the head coach for the William & Mary Tribe men's basketball team for the 1918–19 season.

Geddy was born in 1897. Following his brief career on the staff of William and Mary athletics, Geddy began practicing law in 1920, working from a second floor of the Peninsula Bank on Duke of Gloucester Street. He was elected as Williamsburg's Commonwealth's Attorney.

In the late 1920s, Geddy became a key member of the small inner circle working with Reverend Doctor W.A.R. Goodwin, the rector of Bruton Parish Church, as the latter headed the secretive project which became the Restoration of Colonial Williamsburg. Mr. Geddy was an officer of the Colonial Williamsburg Foundation for about 25 years, from its incorporation in Virginia until his death in 1952.

== Head coaching record ==
As the head coach for the William & Mary Tribe men's basketball team for the 1918–19 season, Geddy produced a 3–6 record during that time. Geddy was also the head football coach for the two-game 1918 season, but failed to notch a victory in either contest.

=== Football ===
Year	Team	Overall	Conference	Standing	Bowl/playoffs
William & Mary Indians (Independent) (1918)
1918	William & Mary	0–2			
William & Mary:		0–2			
Total:		0–2			

=== Basketball ===
Record table
Season	Team	Overall	Conference	Standing	Postseason
William & Mary Indians (Independent) (1918–1919)
1918–19	William & Mary	3–6			
William & Mary:		3–6			
Total:		3–6			

== Notable accomplishments, heritage ==
Vernon Geddy was a descendant of James and Ann Geddy. James Geddy was a silversmith in Williamsburg during the 18th century. The Historic Area of Colonial Williamsburg features an exhibition of James Geddy's silversmith shop and its operations, as well as the adjacent Geddy House. The building is a composite of restored and reconstructed entities. It has been restored to the period of James Geddy Jr.'s ownership. It was opened to visitors as an exhibition in 1968 with a promotional piece featuring original artwork of Norman Rockwell.

=== Rich Neck Plantation property ===
In the first half of the 20th century, Vernon Geddy and his wife Carrie Cole (née Lane) Geddy, built a home on a piece of land which had been passed down in her family and was part of Rich Neck Plantation in James City County which had been established in the 17th century near the community of Middle Plantation (which was renamed Williamsburg in 1699).

Although the house and dependencies had long since disappeared, Rich Neck Plantation had been home to a number of noted Virginians, including three of seventeenth-century Virginia's big-name secretaries of the colony: Richard Kemp, Sir Thomas Lundford, and Thomas Ludwell, as well as dozens of slaves and servants. Later, Rich Neck became the home of Reverend Doctor James Blair, who in 1693 became the founder and first president of the College of William and Mary.

Vernon and Carrie Geddy named their home "Holly Hill" for numerous holly trees in near the house. Williamsburg's Holly Hills subdivision now occupies a portion of the former Rich Neck Plantation property west of College Creek. As of May 2010, Vernon and Carrie's grandson, Vernon Geddy III, and his wife, owned and occupied his grandparents' home, Holly Hill. He was also continuing a family tradition of the practice of law in the area. Vernon Meredith Geddy IV also resides in Williamsburg with his wife and her three kids.

=== Legal practice, role with Colonial Williamsburg ===
During the period after he began practicing law in 1920, Vernon Geddy Sr.'s secretary, Mary Inman, read law under his supervision in her spare time. In 1932, she became one of the first women attorneys for the Commonwealth of Virginia, and later served as the City of Williamsburg's first attorney.

Shortly before his death at the age of 53, together with Mary Inman, Mr. Geddy and his son, Vernon M. Geddy Jr. (1926–2005) established the law firm of Geddy & Geddy in 1952. Vernon Geddy Jr. had graduated from Princeton University and was later named as president of the Virginia Bar Association during 1972–73.

During the early years of the Restoration of Colonial Williamsburg in the late 1920s, Geddy worked closely with the Reverend Doctor W.A.R. Goodwin, the rector of Bruton Parish Church, who had successfully enlisted the participation and financial role of John D. Rockefeller Jr. and his wife Abby Aldrich Rockefeller in the project. Geddy was one of only a handful of confidants as he assisted Dr. Goodman in his role as Rockefeller's silent partner acquiring numerous properties in what became the Historic Area of the old colonial capital city. He later drafted the Virginia corporate papers, filing them with the Virginia State Corporation Commission (SCC). After receiving the charter authorization from the SCC for the two corporations, he served briefly as the first President of the Colonial Williamsburg Foundation, and for many years, was its Executive Vice President.
