= Milton Aronowitz =

American football coach (1891–1981)

Biographical details
- Born: December 7, 1891; Albany, New York, U.S.
- Died: August 9, 1981 (aged 89); Albany, New York, U.S.

Coaching career (HC unless noted)
- 1918: Delaware

Head coaching record
- Overall: 1–2–2

Milton Aronowitz (December 7, 1891 – August 9, 1981) was an American physician who was the ninth head coach of the University of Delaware's college football program. He led them to a 1–2–2 overall record in 1918—his only season as a coach.

Aronowitz was born in Albany, New York into a Jewish family, the son of Polish-Ukrainian immigrants Max Aronowitz and Dora Ettleson. He graduated from Dartmouth College in 1913 and Albany Medical College in 1917. He was a doctor in the University of Delaware's Student Army Training Corps—a U.S. military program to train soldiers in World War One—and coached the SATC's football squad. After the war ended, he returned to Albany to work as a physician. He remained in the medical corps for the National Guard. He died in Albany in 1981.

== Head coaching record ==
Year	Team	Overall	Conference	Standing	Bowl/playoffs
Delaware Fightin' Blue Hens (Independent) (1918)
1918	Delaware	1–2–2			
Delaware:		1–2–2			
Total:		1–2–2			
