= James W. St. Clair =

American football, basketball, and baseball coach

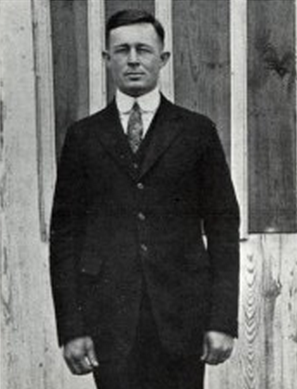
- St. Clair pictured in The Yucca 1922, North Texas State Normal yearbook

Biographical details
- Born: January 20, 1885; Houston, Mississippi, U.S.
- Died: May 4, 1945 (aged 60); Dallas, Texas, U.S.
- Education: Baylor University

Coaching career (HC unless noted)

Football
- 1915–1919: North Texas State Normal

Basketball
- 1914–1915: North Texas State Normal
- 1916–1920: North Texas State Normal
- 1921–1924: North Texas State Normal
- 1924–1938: SMU

Baseball
- 1922–1924: North Texas State Normal
- 1927: SMU
- 1931–1933: SMU

Administrative career (AD unless noted)
- 1938–1945: SWC (exec. sec.)

Head coaching record
- Overall: 20–11–2 (football); 190–129 (basketball); 34–60–1 (baseball)

James Watson St. Clair (January 20, 1885 – May 4, 1945) was an American football, basketball, and baseball coach. He served as head football coach at North Texas State Normal College, now the University of North Texas, from 1915 to 1919, compiling a 20–11–2 record.

St. Clair died of a heart attack on May 4, 1945, at this home in Dallas.

== Head coaching record ==
=== Football ===
Year	Team	Overall	Conference	Standing	Bowl/playoffs
North Texas State Normal (Independent) (1915–1919)
1915	North Texas State Normal	4–2			
1916	North Texas State Normal	4–3–1			
1917	North Texas State Normal	6–1			
1918	North Texas State Normal	1–2–1			
1919	North Texas State Normal	5–3			
North Texas State Normal:		20–11–2			
Total:		20–11–2			
