= 1918 Maryland State Aggies football team =

American college football season

1918 Maryland State Aggies football

Maryland champion
- Conference: South Atlantic Intercollegiate Athletic Association
- Record: 4–1–1 (2–0–1 SAIAA)
- Head coach: Curley Byrd (8th season)

1918 South Atlantic Intercollegiate Athletic Association football standings
	Conf.					Overall
Team	W		L		T	W		L		T
VPI $	3	–	0	–	0	7	–	0	–	0
Davidson	2	–	0	–	0	2	–	1	–	1
Richmond	1	–	0	–	0	3	–	1	–	1
Maryland State	2	–	0	–	1	4	–	1	–	1
Johns Hopkins	0	–	0	–	1	0	–	0	–	1
NC State	0	–	1	–	0	1	–	3	–	0
St. John's (MD)	0	–	1	–	0	0	–	1	–	0
William & Mary	0	–	1	–	0	0	–	2	–	0
VMI	0	–	2	–	0	1	–	3	–	0
Washington and Lee	0	–	2	–	0	1	–	2	–	0
Georgetown	0	–	0	–	0	3	–	2	–	0
$ – Conference champion

The 1918 Maryland State Aggies football team was an American football team that represented Maryland State College (which in 1920 became part of the University of Maryland) in the 1918 college football season. In their eighth season under head coach Curley Byrd, the Aggies compiled a 4–1–1 record, and outscored all opponents by a total of 57 to 35.

Due to the United States' participation in World War I, the 1918 team was not selected from the general student body. Instead, the team was a Students' Army Training Corps squad.

== Schedule ==
Date	Opponent	Site	Result	Attendance	Source
October 26	American University Chemical Warfare Service*	College Park, MD	L 13–20		
November 2	at VMI	Lexington, VA	W 7–6		
November 9	vs. Western Maryland*	Baltimore, MD	W 19–0		
November 16	NYU*	College Park, MD	W 6–2		
November 23	at St. John's (MD)	Baltimore, MD	W 19–14		
November 28	at Johns Hopkins	Homewood Field; Baltimore, MD	T 0–0	1,000	
*Non-conference game
