= John Ripple =

American football player (1897–1965)

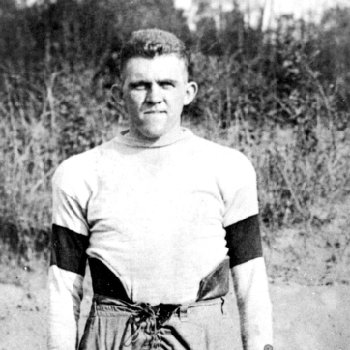
- John Ripple circa 1919

Profile
- Position: Tackle

Personal information
- Born: October 25, 1897; Lexington, North Carolina, U.S.
- Died: July 27, 1965 (aged 67); Durham, North Carolina, U.S.
- Listed height: 6 ft 0 in (1.83 m)
- Listed weight: 180 lb (82 kg)

Career information
- College: North Carolina A&M (1917–1920)

Awards and highlights
- Second-team All-American (1918)

John Hollis "Gus" Ripple (October 25, 1897 – July 27, 1965) was a college football player.

== North Carolina A&M ==
Ripple was a prominent tackle for the NC State Wolfpack of North Carolina A&M. One writer ranks Ripple as the fifth greatest player ever to grace the school. He was a member of the Delta Sigma Phi fraternity.

=== 1918 ===
He was the first football player from North Carolina ever to make an All-America team when he was selected second-team All-American by Walter Camp. Camp rarely selected southern players, Bum Day that year being the first southern Camp first-team All-American ever. North Carolina would not get a first-team All-American until Fred Crawford in 1933. Ripple was only a sophomore and had never played the sport before this year. He was not in the First World War due to catching influenza.

John Heisman's Georgia Tech beat NC State 128 to 0 on Grant Field. State's only highlight came in the third quarter, when Ripple recovered a teammate's fumble and returned the ball 75 yards for a touchdown. However, it was called back due to an offsides penalty. Camp attended that game.
