= 1912 Vanderbilt Commodores football team =

American college football season

1912 Vanderbilt Commodores football
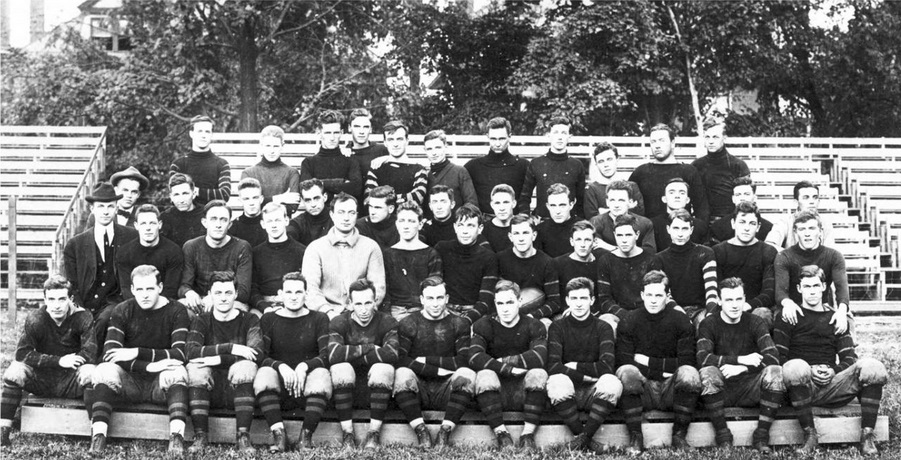

SIAA champion
- Conference: Southern Intercollegiate Athletic Association
- Record: 8–1–1 (3–0–1 SIAA)
- Head coach: Dan McGugin (9th season)
- Offensive scheme: Short punt
- Captain: Lewie Hardage
- Home stadium: Dudley Field

1912 Southern Intercollegiate Athletic Association football standings
	Conf.					Overall
Team	W		L		T	W		L		T
Vanderbilt $	3	–	0	–	1	8	–	1	–	1
Texas A&M	2	–	0	–	0	8	–	1	–	0
Kentucky State	1	–	0	–	0	7	–	2	–	0
Auburn	6	–	1	–	1	6	–	1	–	1
Georgia	5	–	1	–	1	6	–	1	–	1
Sewanee	2	–	1	–	2	5	–	1	–	2
Georgia Tech	5	–	3	–	0	5	–	3	–	1
Alabama	3	–	3	–	1	5	–	3	–	1
Tulane	3	–	3	–	0	5	–	3	–	0
Mississippi A&M	3	–	3	–	0	4	–	3	–	0
Clemson	3	–	3	–	0	4	–	4	–	0
Ole Miss	2	–	2	–	0	5	–	3	–	0
Mercer	2	–	3	–	1	5	–	3	–	1
LSU	2	–	3	–	0	4	–	3	–	0
Mississippi College	1	–	4	–	0	3	–	4	–	0
Tennessee	1	–	4	–	0	4	–	4	–	0
Florida	0	–	2	–	1	5	–	2	–	1
Central University	0	–	2	–	0	4	–	5	–	0
The Citadel	0	–	3	–	0	2	–	4	–	0
Howard (AL)	0	–	4	–	0	1	–	7	–	0
$ – Conference champion

The 1912 Vanderbilt Commodores football team represented Vanderbilt University in the 1912 college football season. The 1912 season was Dan McGugin's ninth year as head coach. Members of the Southern Intercollegiate Athletic Association (SIAA), the Commodores won their third straight conference title this year, posting an 8–1–1 win–loss–tie record (3–0–1 SIAA). The team played its home games at Dudley Field. It used the short punt formation as its offensive scheme.

Vanderbilt outscored its opponents 391–19. The team scored 100 points in each of the first two contests; the 105–0 victory over Bethel of Russellville, Kentucky was the largest in Vanderbilt history. The team posted seven shutout victories, being scored upon in only three games. The team's only loss came to national champion Harvard. The Commodores also played to a tie with the Auburn Tigers.

Several players received postseason honors. Halfback and team captain Lewie Hardage was selected a third-team All-American by Walter Camp, the fourth player from the South ever to receive such recognition, and was a unanimous first-team All-Southern selection. Center Hugh Morgan, end Enoch Brown, tackle Tom Brown, fullback Ammie Sikes, and guard Herman Daves also received All-Southern recognition.

== Schedule ==
Date	Time	Opponent	Site	Result	Attendance	Source
September 28	3:30 p.m.	Bethel (KY)*	Dudley Field; Nashville, TN	W 105–0		
October 5		Maryville (TN)*	Dudley Field; Nashville, TN	W 100–3		
October 12		Rose Poly*	Dudley Field; Nashville, TN	W 54–0		
October 19		at Georgia	Ponce de Leon Park; Atlanta, GA (rivalry)	W 46–0	4,500	
October 26		Ole Miss	Dudley Field; Nashville, TN (rivalry)	W 24–0		
November 2		Virginia*	Dudley Field; Nashville, TN	W 13–0	4,000	
November 9		at Harvard*	Harvard Stadium; Boston, MA	L 3–9		
November 16		Central University*	Dudley Field; Nashville, TN	W 23–0		
November 23		at Auburn	Rickwood Field; Birmingham, AL	T 7–7		
November 28		Sewanee	Dudley Field; Nashville, TN (rivalry)	W 16–0	10,000	
*Non-conference game

== Before the season ==
Vanderbilt faced its hardest schedule to date. The team lost several varsity letter winners to graduation, including quarterback Ray Morrison, tackle Ewing Y. Freeland, and guards Charles H. Brown and Will Metzger. Aside from Morrison, Vanderbilt retained the rest of its backfield of the previous year, then voted best in the South by the Atlanta Constitution. It included halfbacks Lew Hardage (the team's captain) and Wilson Collins and fullback Ammie Sikes. Replacing Morrison at quarterback was renowned drop kicker Zach Curlin.

The 1912 season saw the NCAA implement several rule changes to increase scoring. These included: the value of a touchdown increased from 5 points to 6, the length of the field was reduced to 100 yards, 10-yard end zones were added, the onside kick was eliminated, and unlimited use of the forward pass was introduced.

== Game summaries ==
=== Bethel (KY) ===
The season started with the largest win in school history, a 105–0 victory over Bethel of Russellville, Kentucky. Future Vanderbilt star Josh Cody played for Bethel.

The game began at 3:30 p.m. in pouring rain. Wilson Collins began the scoring when he took a punt 45 yards down the right sideline for a touchdown. Substitute quarterback Rabbi Robins was better suited to the mud than starter Zach Curlin. At one point during the game, Robins returned a kick 70 yards for a touchdown. Collins had five touchdowns, Enoch Brown three, Hardage, Robins and Morrison two each, and Reyer and Chester one each.

The starting lineup for Vanderbilt was: Turner (left end), Covington (left tackle), Daves (left guard), Morgan (center), Huffman (right guard), T. Brown (right tackle), E. Brown (right end), Curlin (quarterback), Hardage (left halfback), Collins (right halfback), and Sikes (fullback).

=== Maryville (TN) ===
Maryville at Vanderbilt

Team	1	2	3	4	Total
Maryville	0	0	0	3	3
• Vanderbilt	27	16	28	29	100

- Date: October 5
- Location: Dudley Field • Nashville, Tennessee

The Commodores then won by a 100–3 score against the Maryville Scots. Despite the first two games being like practice games, the large scores were a surprise, for in both the substitutes replaced the regulars by the second quarter. Maryville's Badgett scored on a 31-yard field goal in the fourth quarter. One of Vanderbilt's scores was a 40-yard forward pass from Hardage to Brown.

The starting lineup for Vanderbilt was: Turner (left end), Covington (left tackle), Daves (left guard), Morgan (center), Huffman (right guard), T. Brown (right tackle), E. Brown (right end), Curlin (quarterback), Hardage (left halfback), Collins (right halfback), and Sikes (fullback).

=== Rose Polytechnic ===
Rose Polytechnic at Vanderbilt

Team	1	2	3	4	Total
Rose Poly	0	0	0	0	0
• Vanderbilt	20	20	7	7	54

- Date: October 12
- Location: Dudley Field • Nashville, Tennessee
- Referee: Bradley Walker

The game with Rose Polytechnic was seen as the first real test of the season. The Commodores still managed a 54–0 victory, with substitutes replacing the regulars by the end of the first half. The first score came on a 35-yard interception return by Lew Hardage.

During the game's opening drive, Rose Poly tried a trick play with a player in civilian clothes and satchel receiving the ball. He was caught by Vanderbilt defenders before he reached his own 30-yard line.

The starting lineup for Vanderbilt was: Turner (left end), Shipp (left tackle), Daves (left guard), Morgan (center), Swofford (right guard), T. Brown (right tackle), E. Brown (right end), Robins (quarterback), Hardage (left halfback), Collins (right halfback), and Chester (fullback).

=== Georgia ===
The Commodores easily defeated the Georgia Bulldogs 46–0 in the rain. Coaching the Bulldogs was McGugin product Alex Cunningham. The game was played on the infield and part of the right outfield of Ponce de Leon Park. According to Vanderbilt University Quarterly, the score would have been higher but for the water and mud. Georgia star Bob McWhorter was held in check; his best run went for 12 yards.

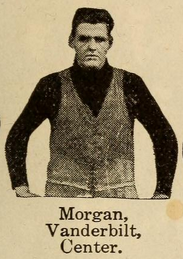
Center Hugh Morgan

The first score of the game came when Wilson Collins got away for a 20-yard run, but fumbled. The ball was picked up by Zach Curlin and run in for a touchdown. When the game ended, Georgia men tried to steal the ball, and a fight broke out, broken up by coach McGugin and umpire Ted Coy.

The starting lineup for Vanderbilt was: Turner (left end), Shipp (left tackle), Daves (left guard), Morgan (center), Huffman (right guard), T. Brown (right tackle), E. Brown (right end), Robins (quarterback), Hardage (left halfback), Shea (right halfback), and Chester (fullback).

=== Ole Miss ===
Vanderbilt beat Ole Miss 24–0, the visitors showing a strong defense. Morgan, Collins, and Sikes were on the sidelines for the whole game. Multiple times, the Commodores fumbled near the goal line.

Game action from Vanderbilt vs. Virginia, 1912

The starting lineup for Vanderbilt was: Milholland (left end), Shipp (left tackle), Daves (left guard), T. Brown (center), Swafford (right guard), Covington (right tackle), E. Brown (right end), Robins (quarterback), Hardage (left halfback), Shea (right halfback), and Turner (fullback).

=== Virginia ===
Virginia at Vanderbilt

Team	1	2	3	4	Total
Virginia	0	0	0	0	0
• Vanderbilt	6	7	0	0	13

- Date: November 2
- Location: Dudley Field • Nashville, Tennessee
- Game attendance: 4,000
- Referee: Selden (Sewanee)

Vanderbilt met Virginia for the first time since 1898. It also won for the first time, 13–0. Ammie Sikes scored first, after runs of 35 and 28 yards by Lew Hardage paved the way. A 30-yard forward pass from Hardage to Enoch Brown got the second touchdown. In the last period, Sikes broke loose, down to the 5-yard line when he was caught from behind by Buck Mayer.

The starting lineup for Vanderbilt was: Turner (left end), Daves (left tackle), Huffman (left guard), Morgan (center), Covington (right guard), T. Brown (right tackle), Milholland (right end), Curlin (quarterback), Hardage (left halfback), Collins (right halfback), and Sikes (fullback).

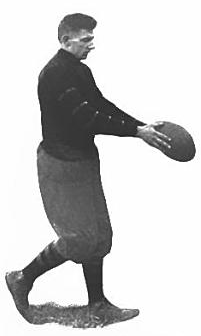
Zach Curlin drop kicked a field goal against Harvard.

=== Harvard ===
Vanderbilt at Harvard

Team	1	2	3	4	Total
Vanderbilt	0	0	3	0	3
• Harvard	0	6	0	3	9

- Date: November 9
- Location: Harvard Stadium • Boston, Massachusetts
- Referee: J. B. Pendleton (Bowdoin)

Vanderbilt suffered its only loss of the season on the road to coach Percy Haughton's national champion Harvard Crimson 9–3. Only Dartmouth played the Crimson closer. "As usual Harvard tried out the strength of its defense in the first period, kicking usually on the second down." Harvard used mostly substitutes and scored a touchdown five minutes after the second period began. Lew Hardage was injured and taken off the field.

Vanderbilt's lone score was a 28-yard field goal from Zach Curlin early in the third quarter, after Harvard muffed a punt. The Crimson added another field goal in the final period.

In the last ten minutes, the Commodores tried their full repertoire of tricks, including a delayed forward pass in which the ball was handled by four men and netted a 22-yard gain from Rabbi Robins. The International News Service reported: "Although defeated, Vanderbilt was not outplayed; for never was a gamer team seen in the Stadium."

The starting lineup for Vanderbilt was: Turner (left end), Shipp (left tackle), Swafford (left guard), Morgan (center), Daves (right guard), T. Brown (right tackle), E. Brown (right end), Curlin (quarterback), Hardage (left halfback), Collins (right halfback), and Sikes (fullback).

=== Central University ===
Vanderbilt playing with just four regulars and a new backfield beat Central University, 23–0. Hardage stayed home in Decatur, Alabama due to an injury.

The starting lineup for Vanderbilt was: Chester (left end), Daves (left tackle), Reyer (left guard), Huffman (center), Swafford (right guard), T. Brown (right tackle), Reams (right end), Robins (quarterback), Luck (left halfback), Shea (right halfback), and Milholland (fullback).

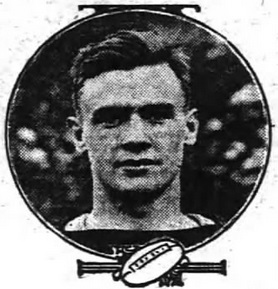
Ammie Sikes

=== Auburn ===
Vanderbilt at Auburn

Team	1	2	3	4	Total
Vanderbilt	0	7	0	0	7
Auburn	0	0	7	0	7

- Date: November 23
- Location: Rickwood Field • Birmingham, Alabama
- Referee: Bradley Walker

The Auburn Tigers upset expectations and tied the Commodores 7–7. Ammie Sikes scored first for Vanderbilt. Auburn scored after a Sikes fumble. The ball was kicked some fifteen yards down field clear of the melee, picked up by Kirk Newell, and run 55 yards to the end zone.

The starting lineup for Vanderbilt was: Reams (left end), Shipp (left tackle), Daves (left guard), Moody (center), Covington (right guard), T. Brown (right tackle), E. Brown (right end), Curlin (quarterback), Hardage (left halfback), Collins (right halfback), and Turner (fullback).

=== Sewanee ===
Sewanee at Vanderbilt

Team	1	2	3	4	Total
Sewanee	0	0	0	0	0
• Vanderbilt	2	0	0	14	16

- Date: November 28
- Location: Dudley Field • Nashville, Tennessee
- Game attendance: 10,000
- Referee: Bradley Walker

Vanderbilt defeated rival Sewanee 16–0. In the first period, Sewanee had to punt from its own end zone. The pass to Jenks Gillem went wide, and before he could recover it he was downed by Enoch Brown for a safety. Gillem had one punt of 58 yards that day. (Note: Gillem was later selected as the punter for the Associated Press All-Time Southeast 1869–1919 era team.) Vanderbilt's game seemed to stagnate until Wilson Collins was hurt and replaced by Tom Shea in the third quarter. Then two touchdowns came in the fourth period, one by Robins and another Turner. In his last game, Lew Hardage played well despite his hurt left ankle.

Vanderbilt had clamored for a rematch to decide a champion after its tie with Auburn, but Auburn was upset by Georgia 12–6, meaning Vanderbilt's victory over Sewanee secured the SIAA title.

The starting lineup for Vanderbilt was: Reams (left end), Shipp (left tackle), Daves (left guard), Morgan (center), Swofford (right guard), T. Brown (right tackle), E. Brown (right end), Robins (quarterback), Hardage (left halfback), Collins (right halfback), and Sikes (fullback).

== After the season ==
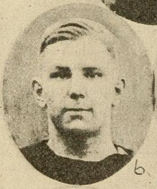
Lew Hardage

=== Awards and honors ===
Lew Hardage was selected third-team All-American by Walter Camp, the fourth ever Southern player to get such a recognition. (Note: Camp's teams had been historically loaded with players from Harvard, Yale, Princeton, Penn, and other Northeastern colleges.) He was a unanimous All-Southern selection. Innis Brown wrote: "Hardage has been rated as probably the most successful man in the south at making forward passes." Ammie Sikes, Hugh Morgan, Tom Brown, and Enoch Brown all made composite All-Southern.

=== Championships ===
Vanderbilt won the SIAA title in football, baseball, and track. According to Nathan Stauffer, Texas A&M was Vanderbilt's nearest challenger for best football team in the South.

== Personnel ==
=== Varsity letterwinners ===
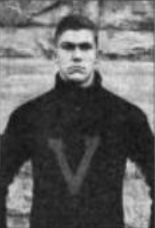
Tom Brown

The lettermen were dubbed "Wearers of the V." Team manager Frank Gilliland was also a letterman.

Line
Player	Position	Games started	Hometown	Prep school	Height	Weight	Age
Tom Brown	tackle	10	Gallatin, Tennessee	Unknown	6'2"	180	22
Joe Covington	guard	5	Unknown	Unknown	Unk.	Unk.	Unk.
Zeke Martin	end	0	Mobile, Alabama	University Military School	Unk.	Unk.	Unk.
Hugh Morgan	center	8	Nashville, Tennessee	Unknown	Unk.	216	19
Kent Morrison	end	0	Unknown	McTyeire School	Unk.	Unk.	Unk.

Backfield
Player	Position	Games started	Hometown	Prep school	Height	Weight	Age
Wilson Collins	halfback	7	Pulaski, Tennessee	Massey School	5'9"	165	23
Zach Curlin	halfback	5	Luxora, Arkansas	Webb School	Unk.	Unk.	22
Lew Hardage	halfback	9	Decatur, Alabama	Unknown	Unk.	165	21
Rabbi Robins	halfback	5	Tupelo, Mississippi	McTyeire School	Unk.	Unk.	21

Scoring leaders
Player	Touchdowns	Extra points	Field goals	Safeties	Points
Lew Hardage	11	27	1	0	96
Wilson Collins	11	0	0	0	66
Rabbi Robins	7	0	0	0	42
Enoch Brown	6	1	0	0	37
Zach Curlin	2	1	4	0	25
Kent Morrison	3	3	0	0	21
Yunk Chester	3	0	0	0	18
Glen Reams	3	0	0	0	18
Tom Shea	3	0	0	0	18
Ammie Sikes	2	0	0	0	12
Tom Brown	1	4	0	0	10
Malcolm Luck	1	0	0	0	6
Whitey Milholland	1	0	0	0	6
Pud Reyer	1	0	0	0	6
Peck Turner	1	0	0	0	6
N/A	0	0	0	2	4
Total	56	36	5	2	391

=== Depth chart ===
The following chart provides a visual depiction of Vanderbilt's lineup during the 1912 season with games started at the position reflected in parentheses. The chart mimics a short punt formation while on offense, with the quarterback under center.

LE
Peck Turner (6)
Glen Reams (2)
Yunk Chester (1)
Whitey Milholland (1)
Zeke Martin (0)

LT	LG	C	RG	RT
Cleveland Shipp (6)	Herman Daves (7)	Hugh Morgan (8)	Swofford (4)	Tom Brown (9)
Joe Covington (2)	Chester Huffman (1)	Tom Brown (1)	Chester Huffman (3)	Joe Covington (1)
Herman Daves (2)	Swofford (1)	Chester Huffman (1)	Joe Covington (2)	R. E. Lowe (0)
	Pud Reyer (1)		Herman Daves (1)	
			Darwin (0)	

RE
Enoch Brown (8)
Glen Reams (1)
Whitey Milholland (1)
Kent Morrison (0)

QB
Zach Curlin (5)
Rabbi Robins (5)

LHB	RHB
Lew Hardage (9)	Wilson Collins (7)
Malcolm Luck (1)	Tom P. Shea (3)

FB
Ammie Sikes (5)
Yunk Chester (2)
Peck Turner (2)
Whitey Milholland (1)

-

== Bibliography ==
- Traughber, Bill (2011). Vanderbilt Football: Tales of Commodore Gridiron History. The History Press. ISBN 978-1-60949-423-0.
- Vanderbilt University (1912). Vanderbilt University Quarterly. Vol. 12.
- Walsh, Christopher J. (2006). Where Football Is King: A History of the SEC. ISBN 9781461734772.
- Woodruff, Fuzzy (1928). A History of Southern Football 1890–1928. Vol. 1.
