= 1912 Southern Intercollegiate Athletic Association football season =

- League: NCAA
- Sport: College football
- Duration: September 28, 1912 through December 25, 1912
- Teams: 19

Regular Season
- Season champions: Vanderbilt

Football seasons
- ← 1911 1913 →

1912 Southern Intercollegiate Athletic Association football standings
	Conf.					Overall
Team	W		L		T	W		L		T
Vanderbilt $	3	–	0	–	1	8	–	1	–	1
Texas A&M	2	–	0	–	0	8	–	1	–	0
Kentucky State	1	–	0	–	0	7	–	2	–	0
Auburn	6	–	1	–	1	6	–	1	–	1
Georgia	5	–	1	–	1	6	–	1	–	1
Sewanee	2	–	1	–	2	5	–	1	–	2
Georgia Tech	5	–	3	–	0	5	–	3	–	1
Alabama	3	–	3	–	1	5	–	3	–	1
Tulane	3	–	3	–	0	5	–	3	–	0
Mississippi A&M	3	–	3	–	0	4	–	3	–	0
Clemson	3	–	3	–	0	4	–	4	–	0
Ole Miss	2	–	2	–	0	5	–	3	–	0
Mercer	2	–	3	–	1	5	–	3	–	1
LSU	2	–	3	–	0	4	–	3	–	0
Mississippi College	1	–	4	–	0	3	–	4	–	0
Tennessee	1	–	4	–	0	4	–	4	–	0
Florida	0	–	2	–	1	5	–	2	–	1
Central University	0	–	2	–	0	4	–	5	–	0
The Citadel	0	–	3	–	0	2	–	4	–	0
Howard (AL)	0	–	4	–	0	1	–	7	–	0
$ – Conference champion

The 1912 Southern Intercollegiate Athletic Association football season was the college football games played by the member schools of the Southern Intercollegiate Athletic Association as part of the 1912 college football season. The season began on September 28.

Ole Miss was suspended at year's end.

Conference champion Vanderbilt suffered its only loss to national champion Harvard. The 1912 season saw the NCAA implement several rule changes to increase scoring. These included: the number of downs allowed to advance the ball at least 10 yards was increased from three to four, the value of a touchdown increased from 5 points to 6, the length of the field was reduced to 100 yards, 10-yard end zones were added, the onside kick was eliminated, and unlimited use of the forward pass was introduced.

== Regular season ==
Index to colors and formatting
Non-conference matchup; SIAA member won
Non-conference matchup; SIAA member lost
Non-conference matchup; tie
Conference matchup

SIAA teams in bold.

=== Week One ===
Date	Visiting team	Home team	Site	Result	Attendance	Reference
September 28	Marion	Alabama	The Quad • Tuscaloosa, AL	**W** 52–0		
September 28	Fort Moultrie	The Citadel	College Park Stadium • Charleston, SC	**W** 1–0 (Note: The Citadel won by forfeit)		
September 28	11th Cavalry	Georgia Tech	The Flats • Atlanta, GA	**T** 0–0		
September 28	Gordon	Mercer	Central City Park • Macon, GA	**W** 29–6		
September 28	Maryville (TN)	Kentucky State	Stoll Field • Lexington, KY	**W** 34–0		
September 28	Vicksburg Athletic Club	Mississippi College	Provine Field • Clinton, MS	**W** 44–0		
September 28	Jacksonville State	Howard (AL)	Howard Athletic Field • Birmingham, AL	**W** 8–0		
September 28	Bethel (KY)	Vanderbilt	Dudley Field • Nashville, TN	**W** 105–0		

=== Week Two ===
Date	Visiting team	Home team	Site	Result	Attendance	Reference
October 4	**Mississippi College**	Mississippi A&M	Hardy Field • Starkville, MS	**MSA&M** 19–0		
October 5	Birmingham	Alabama	The Quad • Tuscaloosa, AL	**W** 62–0		
October 5	**Auburn**	Mercer	Driving Park • Columbus, GA	**AUB** 56–0		
October 5	Kentucky Military Institute	Central University	Cheek Field • Danville, KY	**W** 12–0		
October 5	**Clemson**	Howard (AL)	Alabama State Fairgrounds • Birmingham, AL	**CLEM** 59–0		
October 5	Chattanooga	Georgia	Sanford Field • Athens, GA	**W** 33–0		
October 5	**Georgia Tech**	The Citadel	College Park Stadium • Charleston, SC	**GT** 20–6		
October 5	Marshall	Kentucky State	Stoll Field • Lexington, KY	**W** 13–6		
October 5	Southwestern Louisiana	LSU	State Field • Baton Rouge, LA	**W** 85–3		
October 5	Memphis High School	Ole Miss	University Field • Oxford, MS	**W** 34–0		
October 5	King (TN)	Tennessee	Waite Field • Knoxville, TN	**W** 101–0		
October 5	Maryville (TN)	Vanderbilt	Dudley Field • Nashville, TN	**W** 100–3		

=== Week Three ===
Date	Visiting team	Home team	Site	Result	Attendance	Reference
October 8	Jefferson College (LA)	Tulane	Tulane Stadium • New Orleans, LA	**W** 37–0		
October 9	Morgan Training School	Sewanee	Hardee Field • Sewanee, TN	**W** 34–0		
October 11	**Mississippi College**	LSU	State Field • Baton Rouge, LA	**LSU** 45–0		
October 12	**Florida**	Auburn	Drake Field • Auburn, AL	**AUB** 27–13		
October 12	Morris Harvey	Central University	Cheek Field • Danville, KY	**L** 6–57		
October 12	Riverside Military Academy	Clemson	Bowman Field • Calhoun, SC	**W** 26–0		
October 12	**The Citadel**	Georgia	Sanford Field • Athens, GA	**UGA** 33–0		
October 12	**Alabama**	Georgia Tech	The Flats • Atlanta, GA	**GT** 20–3		
October 12	Miami (OH)	Kentucky State	Stoll Field • Lexington, KY	**L** 8–13		
October 12	**Mercer**	Howard (AL)	Alabama State Fairgrounds • Birmingham, AL	**MER** 36–0		
October 12	Castle Heights	Ole Miss	University Field • Oxford, MS	**W** 1–0 (Note: Ole Miss won by forfeit)		
October 12	Tennessee Docs	Mississippi A&M	Hardy Field • Starkville, MS	**W** 32–0		
October 12	Florence State Normal	Sewanee	Hardee Field • Sewanee, TN	**W** 101–0		
October 12	Maryville (TN)	Tennessee	Waite Field • Knoxville, TN	**W** 38–0		
October 12	Southwestern Louisiana	Tulane	Tulane Stadium • New Orleans, LA	**W** 95–0		
October 12	Rose Poly	Vanderbilt	Dudley Field • Nashville, TN	**W** 54–0		
October 12	Daniel Baker	Texas A&M	Kyle Field • College Station, TX	**W** 50–0		

=== Week Four ===
Date	Visiting team	Home team	Site	Result	Attendance	Reference
October 17	**Central University**	Louisville	High School Park • Louisville, KY	**L** 6–23		
October 18	**Alabama**	**Mississippi A&M**	Aberdeen, MS	**MSA&M** 7–0		
October 18	**Howard (AL)**	Marion	Marion Field • Marion, AL	**L** 0–57		
October 18	Trinity (TX)	**Texas A&M**	Kyle Field • College Station, TX	**W** 59–0		
October 19	**Clemson**	**Auburn**	Drake Field • Auburn, AL	**AUB** 27–6		
October 19	Porter Military Academy	**The Citadel**	College Park Stadium • Charleston, SC	**W** 66–0		
October 19	South Carolina	**Florida**	University Field • Gainesville, FL	**W** 10–6		
October 19	**Georgia Tech**	**Mercer**	Central City Park • Macon, GA	**GT** 16–0		
October 19	**Kentucky State**	Cincinnati	Carson Field • Cincinnati, OH	**W** 19–13		
October 19	**Ole Miss**	**LSU**	State Field • Baton Rouge, LA	**MISS** 10–7		
October 19	Chattanooga	**Sewanee**	Hardee Field • Sewanee, TN	**W** 27–0		
October 19	**Tennessee**	Tennessee Docs	Red Elm Park • Memphis, TN	**W** 62–0		
October 19	**Mississippi College**	**Tulane**	Tulane Stadium • New Orleans, LA	**TUL** 19–6		
October 19	**Vanderbilt**	**Georgia**	Ponce de Leon Park • Atlanta, GA	**VAN** 46–0	4,500	

=== Week Five ===
Date	Visiting team	Home team	Site	Result	Attendance	Reference
October 26	**Mississippi A&M**	Auburn	Rickwood Field • Birmingham, AL	**AUB** 7–0		
October 26	**Alabama**	Georgia	Driving Park • Columbus, GA	**UGA** 13–9		
October 26	Chattanooga	Central University	Cheek Field • Danville, KY	**W** 7–6		
October 26	**The Citadel**	Clemson	Bowman Field • Calhoun, SC	**CLEM** 52–14		
October 26	**Georgia Tech**	Florida	Jacksonville, FL	**GT** 14–7		
October 26	Stetson	Mercer	Waycross, GA	**W** 6–0		
October 26	**Tennessee**	Sewanee	Chamberlain Field • Chattanooga, TN	**SEW** 33–6		
October 26	**Howard (AL)**	Tulane	Tulane Stadium • New Orleans, LA	**TUL** 35–0		
October 26	**Ole Miss**	Vanderbilt	Dudley Field • Nashville, TN	**VAN** 24–0		
October 26	Louisville	Kentucky State	Stoll Field • Lexington, KY	**W** 41–0		
October 26	Arkansas	Texas A&M	State Fairgrounds • Dallas, TX	**W** 27–0		

=== Week Six ===
Date	Visiting team	Home team	Site	Result	Attendance	Reference
October 31	**Clemson**	South Carolina	State Fairgrounds • Columbia, SC	**L** 7–22	3,500	
November 1	**Mississippi College**	**Ole Miss**	University Field • Oxford, MS	**MISS** 12–0		
November 1	Austin	**Texas A&M**	Kyle Field • College Station, TX	**W** 57–0		
November 2	**Alabama**	**Tulane**	Tulane Stadium • New Orleans, LA	**ALA** 7–0		
November 2	**Auburn**	**Georgia Tech**	The Flats • Atlanta, GA	**AUB** 27–7		
November 2	VMI	**Kentucky State**	Stoll Field • Lexington, KY	**L** 2–3		
November 2	Columbia College (FL)	**Mercer**	Valdosta, GA	**W** 71–0		
November 2	**Mississippi A&M**	**LSU**	State Field • Baton Rouge, LA	**MSA&M** 7–0		
November 2	**Sewanee**	**Georgia**	Sanford Field • Athens, GA	**T** 13–13		
November 2	**Central University**	**Tennessee**	Waite Field • Knoxville, TN	**TENN** 67–0		
November 2	Virginia	**Vanderbilt**	Dudley Field • Nashville, TN	**W** 13–0	4,000	
November 4	College of Charleston	**Florida**	Fleming Field • Gainesville, FL	**W** 78–0		
November 5	**Howard (AL)**	Seventh District Agricultural School	Marshall County Fairgrounds • Albertville, AL	**L** 0–13		

=== Week Seven ===
Date	Visiting team	Home team	Site	Result	Attendance	Reference
November 7	**Clemson**	**Georgia**	Augusta, GA	**UGA** 27–6		
November 9	**Ole Miss**	**Alabama**	The Quad • Tuscaloosa, AL	**ALA** 10–9		
November 9	**LSU**	**Auburn**	Monroe Park • Mobile, AL	**AUB** 7–0		
November 9	Kentucky School for the Deaf	**Central University**	Cheek Field • Danville, KY	**W** 13–7		
November 9	College of Charleston	**The Citadel**	College Park Stadium • Charleston, SC	**W** 40–0		
November 9	Hanover	**Kentucky State**	Stoll Field • Lexington, KY	**W** 64–0		
November 9	**Tennessee**	**Mercer**	Central City Park • Macon, GA	**MER** 27–14		
November 9	Louisiana Industrial	**Mississippi College**	Provine Field • Clinton, MS	**W** 14–13		
November 9	**Sewanee**	**Georgia Tech**	The Flats • Atlanta, GA	**SEW** 7–0		
November 9	**Mississippi A&M**	**Tulane**	Tulane Stadium • New Orleans, LA	**TUL** 27–24		
November 9	**Vanderbilt**	Harvard	Harvard Stadium • Boston, MA	**L** 3–9		

=== Week Eight ===
Date	Visiting team	Home team	Site	Result	Attendance	Reference
November 11	Oklahoma	**Texas A&M**	West End Park • Houston, TX	**W** 28–6		
November 13	**Ole Miss**	Texas	West End Park • Houston, TX	**L** 14–53		
November 15	Stetson	**Florida**	Fleming Field • Gainesville, FL	**W** 23–7		
November 16	**Clemson**	**Mercer**	Central City Park • Macon, GA	**CLEM** 21–13		
November 16	**Georgia**	**Georgia Tech**	The Flats • Atlanta, GA	**UGA** 20–0		
November 16	**Kentucky State**	**Tennessee**	Waite Field • Knoxville, TN	**UK** 13–6		
November 16	**LSU**	Arkansas	West End Park • Little Rock, AR	**W** 7–6		
November 16	**Ole Miss**	Tennessee Docs	Red Elm Park • Memphis, TN	**W** 47–6		
November 16	**Sewanee**	**Alabama**	Rickwood Field • Birmingham, AL	**T** 6–6		
November 16	**Mississippi A&M**	**Texas A&M**	Kyle Field • College Station, TX	**TXA&M** 41–7		
November 16	**Central University**	**Vanderbilt**	Dudley Field • Nashville, TN	**VAN** 23–0		

=== Week Nine ===
Date	Visiting team	Home team	Site	Result	Attendance	Reference
November 19	**Tulane**	**Texas A&M**	Kyle Field • College Station, TX	**TXA&M** 41–0		
November 21	**Central University**	Georgetown (KY)	Hinton Field • Georgetown, KY	**L** 12–34		
November 22	Birmingham	**Howard (AL)**	Rickwood Field • Birmingham, AL	**L** 6–13		
November 22	Kansas State	**Texas A&M**	Kyle Field • College Station, TX	**L** 10–13		
November 23	**Vanderbilt**	**Auburn**	Rickwood Field • Birmingham, AL	**T** 7–7		

=== Week Ten ===
Date	Visiting team	Home team	Site	Result	Attendance	Reference
November 28	**Tennessee**	**Alabama**	Rickwood Field • Birmingham, AL	**ALA** 7–0		
November 28	**Auburn**	**Georgia**	Sanford Field • Athens, GA	**UGA** 12–6		
November 28	**Central University**	Transylvania	Thomas Field • Lexington, KY	**W** 13–7		
November 28	**Clemson**	**Georgia Tech**	The Flats • Atlanta, GA	**GT** 23–0		
November 28	Cincinnati YMI	**Kentucky State**	Stoll Field • Lexington, KY	**W** 56–0		
November 28	**LSU**	**Tulane**	Tulane Stadium • New Orleans, LA	**LSU** 21–3		
November 28	**Mercer**	**Florida**	Jacksonville, FL	**T** 0–0		
November 28	**The Citadel**	South Carolina	Davis Field • Columbia, SC	**L** 2–26		
November 28	**Sewanee**	**Vanderbilt**	Dudley Field • Nashville, TN	**VAN** 16–0	10,000	
November 28	Baylor	**Texas A&M**	Gaston Park • Dallas, TX	**W** 53–0		
November 29	**Howard (AL)**	**Mississippi College**	Kamper Park • Hattiesburg, MS	**MSCOLL** 20–0		

=== Week Fourteen ===
Date	Visiting team	Home team	Site	Result	Attendance	Reference
December 21	**Florida**	Tampa Athletic Club	Tampa, FL	**W** 44–0		

== Bowl games ==
Date	Bowl Game	Site	SIAA Team	Opponent	Score	Reference
December 25, 1912	Bacardi Bowl	Almendares Park • Havana, Cuba	Florida	Vedado Athletic Club	FLA 28–0	

== Awards and honors ==
=== All-Americans ===
- HB - Lew Hardage, Vanderbilt (WC-3)

=== All-Southern team ===
The composite All-Southern team formed by "consolidated pick" of ten sporting writers culled by the Atlanta Constitution editor Dick Jemison included:

Position	Name	First-team selectors	Team
QB	Lee Tolley	C	Sewanee
HB	Lew Hardage	C	Vanderbilt
HB	Bob McWhorter	C	Georgia
FB	Ammie Sikes	C	Vanderbilt
E	Enoch Brown	C	Vanderbilt
T	Tom Brown	C	Vanderbilt
G	Rube Barker	C	Mississippi
C	Hugh Morgan	C	Vanderbilt
G	David Peacock	C	Georgia
T	B. J. Lamb	C	Auburn
E	Jenks Gillem	C	Sewanee
