= 1912 Howard Baptists football team =

American college football season

1912 Howard Baptists football
- Conference: Southern Intercollegiate Athletic Association
- Record: 1–7 (0–4 SIAA)
- Head coach: B. L. Noojin (1st season)
- Home stadium: Howard Athletic Field; Alabama State Fairgrounds

1912 Southern Intercollegiate Athletic Association football standings
	Conf.					Overall
Team	W		L		T	W		L		T
Vanderbilt $	3	–	0	–	1	8	–	1	–	1
Texas A&M	2	–	0	–	0	8	–	1	–	0
Kentucky State	1	–	0	–	0	7	–	2	–	0
Auburn	6	–	1	–	1	6	–	1	–	1
Georgia	5	–	1	–	1	6	–	1	–	1
Sewanee	2	–	1	–	2	5	–	1	–	2
Georgia Tech	5	–	3	–	0	5	–	3	–	1
Alabama	3	–	3	–	1	5	–	3	–	1
Tulane	3	–	3	–	0	5	–	3	–	0
Mississippi A&M	3	–	3	–	0	4	–	3	–	0
Clemson	3	–	3	–	0	4	–	4	–	0
Ole Miss	2	–	2	–	0	5	–	3	–	0
Mercer	2	–	3	–	1	5	–	3	–	1
LSU	2	–	3	–	0	4	–	3	–	0
Mississippi College	1	–	4	–	0	3	–	4	–	0
Tennessee	1	–	4	–	0	4	–	4	–	0
Florida	0	–	2	–	1	5	–	2	–	1
Central University	0	–	2	–	0	4	–	5	–	0
The Citadel	0	–	3	–	0	2	–	4	–	0
Howard (AL)	0	–	4	–	0	1	–	7	–	0
$ – Conference champion

The 1912 Howard Baptists football team was an American football team that represented Howard College (now known as the Samford University) as a member of the Southern Intercollegiate Athletic Association (SIAA) during the 1912 college football season. In their first year under head coach B. L. Noojin, the team compiled an 1–7 record.

== Schedule ==
Date	Opponent	Site	Result	Source
September 28	Jacksonville State*	Howard Athletic Field; Birmingham, AL (rivalry)	W 8–0	
October 5	Clemson	Alabama State Fairgrounds; Birmingham, AL	L 0–59	
October 12	Mercer	Alabama State Fairgrounds; Birmingham, AL	L 0–36	
October 18	at Marion*	Marion Field; Marion, AL	L 0–57	
October 26	at Tulane	Tulane Stadium; New Orleans, LA	L 0–35	
November 5	at Seventh District Agricultural School*	Marshall County Fairgrounds; Albertville, AL	L 0–13	
November 22	vs. Birmingham*	Rickwood Field; Birmingham, AL	L 6–13	
November 28	vs. Mississippi College	Kamper Park; Hattiesburg, MS	L 0–20	
*Non-conference game
