= 1912 Tennessee Volunteers football team =

American college football season

1912 Tennessee Volunteers football
- Conference: Southern Intercollegiate Athletic Association
- Record: 4–4 (1–4 SIAA)
- Head coach: Zora Clevenger (2nd season)
- Offensive scheme: Straight T
- Base defense: Multiple
- Captain: C. H. Fonde
- Home stadium: Waite Field

1912 Southern Intercollegiate Athletic Association football standings
| | Conf. | | | | | Overall |
| Team | W | | L | | T | W | | L | | T |
|---|---|---|---|---|---|---|---|---|---|---|
| Vanderbilt $ | 3 | – | 0 | – | 1 | 8 | – | 1 | – | 1 |
| Texas A&M | 2 | – | 0 | – | 0 | 8 | – | 1 | – | 0 |
| Kentucky State | 1 | – | 0 | – | 0 | 7 | – | 2 | – | 0 |
| Auburn | 6 | – | 1 | – | 1 | 6 | – | 1 | – | 1 |
| Georgia | 5 | – | 1 | – | 1 | 6 | – | 1 | – | 1 |
| Sewanee | 2 | – | 1 | – | 2 | 5 | – | 1 | – | 2 |
| Georgia Tech | 5 | – | 3 | – | 0 | 5 | – | 3 | – | 1 |
| Alabama | 3 | – | 3 | – | 1 | 5 | – | 3 | – | 1 |
| Tulane | 3 | – | 3 | – | 0 | 5 | – | 3 | – | 0 |
| Mississippi A&M | 3 | – | 3 | – | 0 | 4 | – | 3 | – | 0 |
| Clemson | 3 | – | 3 | – | 0 | 4 | – | 4 | – | 0 |
| Ole Miss | 2 | – | 2 | – | 0 | 5 | – | 3 | – | 0 |
| Mercer | 2 | – | 3 | – | 1 | 5 | – | 3 | – | 1 |
| LSU | 2 | – | 3 | – | 0 | 4 | – | 3 | – | 0 |
| Mississippi College | 1 | – | 4 | – | 0 | 3 | – | 4 | – | 0 |
| Tennessee | 1 | – | 4 | – | 0 | 4 | – | 4 | – | 0 |
| Florida | 0 | – | 2 | – | 1 | 5 | – | 2 | – | 1 |
| Central University | 0 | – | 2 | – | 0 | 4 | – | 5 | – | 0 |
| The Citadel | 0 | – | 3 | – | 0 | 2 | – | 4 | – | 0 |
| Howard (AL) | 0 | – | 4 | – | 0 | 1 | – | 7 | – | 0 |
$ – Conference champion

The 1912 Tennessee Volunteers football team was an American football team that represented the University of Tennessee as a member of the Southern Intercollegiate Athletic Association (SIAA) during the 1912 college football season. In their second year under head coach Zora Clevenger, the team compiled a 4–4 record.

== Schedule ==
| Date | Opponent | Site | Result | Source |
|---|---|---|---|---|
| October 5 | King (TN)* | Waite Field; Knoxville, TN | W 101–0 | |
| October 12 | Maryville (TN)* | Waite Field; Knoxville, TN | W 38–0 | |
| October 19 | at Tennessee Docs* | Red Elm Park; Memphis, TN | W 62–0 | |
| October 26 | vs. Sewanee | Chamberlain Field; Chattanooga, TN | L 6–33 | |
| November 2 | Central University | Waite Field; Knoxville, TN | W 67–0 | |
| November 9 | at Mercer | Central City Park; Macon, GA | L 14–27 | |
| November 16 | Kentucky State College | Waite Field; Knoxville, TN (rivalry) | L 6–13 | |
| November 28 | at Alabama | Rickwood Field; Birmingham, AL (rivalry) | L 0–7 | |
*Non-conference game
