= 1912 Florida Gators football team =

American college football season

1912 Florida Gators football
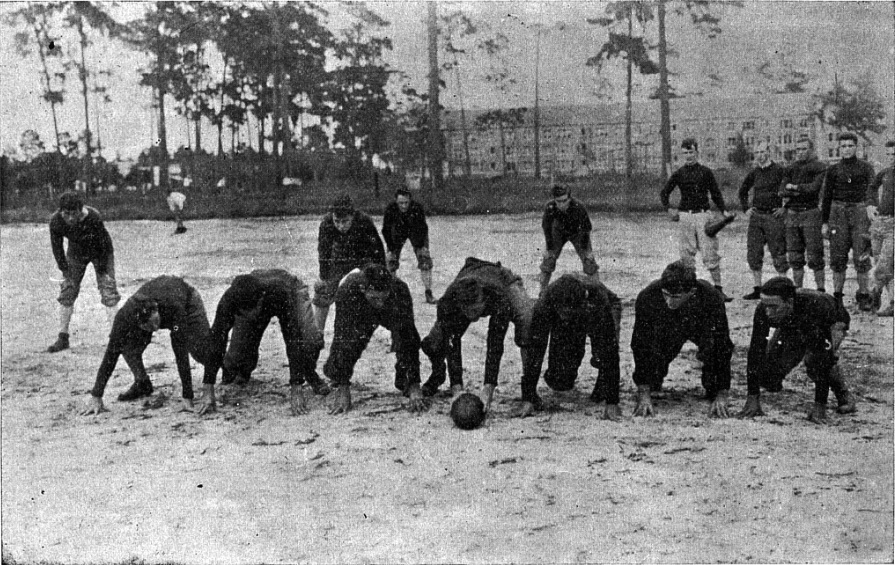
- The 1912 Gators practicing on the UF campus

Bacardi Bowl, W 28–0 vs. Vedado Tennis Club
- Conference: Southern Intercollegiate Athletic Association
- Record: 5–2–1 (0–2–1 SIAA)
- Head coach: George E. Pyle (4th season)
- Captain: Sam Buie
- Home stadium: University Athletic Field

1912 Southern Intercollegiate Athletic Association football standings
	Conf.					Overall
Team	W		L		T	W		L		T
Vanderbilt $	3	–	0	–	1	8	–	1	–	1
Texas A&M	2	–	0	–	0	8	–	1	–	0
Kentucky State	1	–	0	–	0	7	–	2	–	0
Auburn	6	–	1	–	1	6	–	1	–	1
Georgia	5	–	1	–	1	6	–	1	–	1
Sewanee	2	–	1	–	2	5	–	1	–	2
Georgia Tech	5	–	3	–	0	5	–	3	–	1
Alabama	3	–	3	–	1	5	–	3	–	1
Tulane	3	–	3	–	0	5	–	3	–	0
Mississippi A&M	3	–	3	–	0	4	–	3	–	0
Clemson	3	–	3	–	0	4	–	4	–	0
Ole Miss	2	–	2	–	0	5	–	3	–	0
Mercer	2	–	3	–	1	5	–	3	–	1
LSU	2	–	3	–	0	4	–	3	–	0
Mississippi College	1	–	4	–	0	3	–	4	–	0
Tennessee	1	–	4	–	0	4	–	4	–	0
Florida	0	–	2	–	1	5	–	2	–	1
Central University	0	–	2	–	0	4	–	5	–	0
The Citadel	0	–	3	–	0	2	–	4	–	0
Howard (AL)	0	–	4	–	0	1	–	7	–	0
$ – Conference champion

The 1912 Florida Gators football team represented the University of Florida during the 1912 college football season. The season was the fourth for George Pyle as the Florida Gators football team's head coach. Pyle's 1912 Florida Gators finished their seventh varsity football season with an SIAA conference record of 1–2 and an overall winning record of 5–2–1.

The 1912 season saw several milestone events for the young program, including the first season in which they officially competed as the "Florida Gators"; their first conference games (in the Southern Intercollegiate Athletic Association), their first contests with future rivals Auburn, Georgia Tech, and South Carolina, and their first participation in a post-season bowl game. Florida also claimed an unofficial state championship by beating in-state rival Stetson for the third consecutive year.

== Schedule ==
Date	Opponent	Site	Result	Source
October 12	at Auburn	Drake Field; Auburn, AL (rivalry)	L 13–27	
October 19	South Carolina*	University Field; Gainesville, FL	W 10–6	
October 26	vs. Georgia Tech	Jacksonville, FL	L 6–14	
November 4	College of Charleston*	University Field; Gainesville, FL	W 78–0	
November 15	Stetson*	University Field; Gainesville, FL	W 23–7	
November 28	vs. Mercer	Jacksonville, FL	T 0–0	
December 21	at Tampa Athletic Club*	Tampa, FL	W 44–0	
December 25	at Vedado Athletic Club*	Almendares Park; Havana, Cuba (Bacardi Bowl)	W 28–0	
*Non-conference game

== Before the season ==
Florida joined the Southern Intercollegiate Athletic Association, a large confederation of southern athletic programs that was the precursor to several other regional conferences, including the Southeastern Conference. This raised the profile of the young program (1912 was only the seventh academic year for the modern University of Florida) and allowed more contests against older football programs in the south and elsewhere. As Florida sportswriter and UF alumnus Tom McEwen wrote, "it was in 1912 when the Gators really ventured out into big-time football."

== Game summaries ==
=== Auburn ===
The season began with the first-ever game against coach Mike Donahue's Auburn Tigers, a 13–27 loss. Florida was unable to gain on Auburn's line, and made its scores off Auburn miscues. "The team, the coach and the University are happy over this honorable result, and grant cheerfully that Florida is not master; but only the worthy opponent of the Southern team, which, with Vanderbilt, claims the Southern pennant." Though a loss, the Gators scored more points than any other Auburn opponent that year.

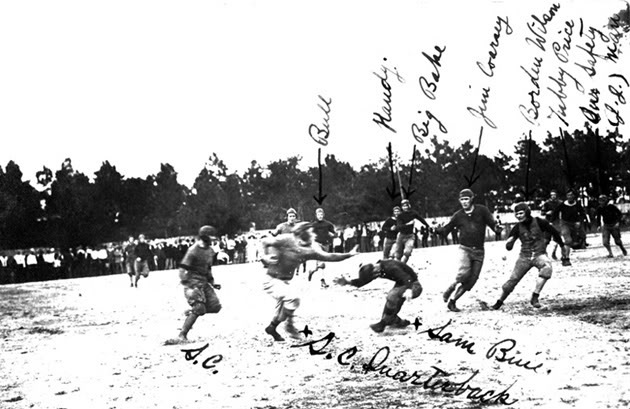
The South Carolina contest.

=== South Carolina ===
South Carolina at Florida

Team	1	2	3	4	Total
S. Carolina	3	0	3	0	6
• Florida	0	0	3	7	10

- Date: October 19
- Location: University Field • Gainesville, FL

In the second week of play, the Gators defeated the South Carolina Gamecocks for the first time 10–6. One writer labeled it "the most thrilling and hardest fought game ever played on University Field."

Florida came back to win down 3–0 at the half, Dummy Taylor had an 18-yard drop kick field goal. After Taylor missed a drop kick, Carolina fumbled, and Florida's Hoyle Pounds recovered for a touchdown.

=== Georgia Tech ===
Georgia Tech at Florida

Team	1	2	3	4	Total
• Ga. Tech	7	0	7	0	14
Florida	0	6	0	0	6

- Date: October 26
- Location: Jacksonville, FL
- Referee: Pat Murray

In their first time facing John Heisman's Georgia Tech team, Florida fell 6–14 in Jacksonville. Down 7–0, Florida scored after two passes from Tenney to Pounds, the first netting 40 yards. Alf McDonald made Tech's second touchdown.

The starting lineup was Mosley (left end), Coarsey (left tackle), Wilson (left guard), Watt (center), Baker (right guard), Sutton (right tackle), Pounds (right end), Buie (quarterback), Tenney (left halfback), Taylor (right halfback), McCullock (fullback).

=== Charleston ===
The Gators beat the College of Charleston 78–0. Florida used several forward passes.

=== Stetson ===
Florida gave Stetson its worst loss on the year, 23–7. This was considered Dummy Taylor's greatest game. He kicked three field goals, two extra points, and ran for a touchdown.

=== Mercer ===
The Mercer Baptists fought the Gators to a scoreless tie. Mercer outweighed Florida, and both squads attempted several field goals. Mercer had shut out Florida each time they had met.

=== Tampa Athletic Club ===
Before the contest in Cuba, the Gators stopped in Tampa and defeated the Tampa Athletic Club 44–0. Rex Farrior, a high school senior who would become the captain of Florida's football team soon thereafter, played on the amateur home squad.

== Postseason ==
=== Bacardi Bowl ===
In December, the Florida Gators team competed in their first ever post-season games: the Bacardi Bowl, a two-game series in Havana against squads from two Cuban athletic clubs.

The first game was held on Christmas Day, and the Gators defeated the Vedado Athletic Club, 28–0. The second game, which pitted the Gators against the Cuban Athletic Club of Havana, ended abruptly when Coach Pyle realized that the officials were running the game according to football's old rules and that the head referee was the former coach of his opponent. Pyle pulled his players off the field during the first quarter and was arrested for violating a Cuban law prohibiting a game's suspension after spectators' money had been collected. A trial was scheduled and Pyle was released on bail, at which point he, the team, and the Gators' entire traveling party quickly boarded a steamship for Tampa, an escape which caused the coach to be branded a "fugitive from justice" by Cuban authorities.

Bacardi Bowl officials declared that Florida had forfeited the second game and listed the result as a 1–0 win for the Cuban Athletic Club, while the University of Florida declared the game a 1–0 forfeit win for the Gators. In later years, the incomplete game was dropped from the university's official football record, and Florida's football teams would never again compete against a squad from Cuba.

== Personnel ==
=== Line ===
Player	Position	Games started	High school	Height	Weight	Age
A. A. Baker	guard				175	
Sam Buie	end				124	
Jim Coarsey	tackle				170	
S. W. Lawler	guard					
Merritt	tackle					
Hoyle Pounds	end					
Hubby Price	guard					
Shands	end					
John Sutton	guard			6'0"	185	21
Wilson	center					

=== Backfield ===
Player	Position	Games started	High school	Height	Weight	Age
Bullock	fullback					
Harvey Hester	quarterback					
Dummy Taylor	halfback				165	21
Louis E. Tenney	halfback				155	

=== Subs ===
Player	Position	Games started	High school	Height	Weight	Age
Beelor
Hunt
McIntosh
Mosely

== Bibliography ==
- Carlson, Norm (2007). University of Florida Football Vault: The History of the Florida Gators. Atlanta, Georgia: Whitman Publishing, LLC. ISBN 978-0-7948-2298-9.
- McEwen, Tom (1974). The Gators: A Story of Florida Football. Huntsville, Alabama: The Strode Publishers. ISBN 0-87397-025-X.
