= 1912 Auburn Tigers football team =

American college football season

1912 Auburn Tigers football
- Conference: Southern Intercollegiate Athletic Association
- Record: 6–1–1 (6–1–1 SIAA)
- Head coach: Mike Donahue (8th season)
- Base defense: 7–2–2
- Captain: Rip Major
- Home stadium: Drake Field; Rickwood Field

1912 Southern Intercollegiate Athletic Association football standings
	Conf.					Overall
Team	W		L		T	W		L		T
Vanderbilt $	3	–	0	–	1	8	–	1	–	1
Texas A&M	2	–	0	–	0	8	–	1	–	0
Kentucky State	1	–	0	–	0	7	–	2	–	0
Auburn	6	–	1	–	1	6	–	1	–	1
Georgia	5	–	1	–	1	6	–	1	–	1
Sewanee	2	–	1	–	2	5	–	1	–	2
Georgia Tech	5	–	3	–	0	5	–	3	–	1
Alabama	3	–	3	–	1	5	–	3	–	1
Tulane	3	–	3	–	0	5	–	3	–	0
Mississippi A&M	3	–	3	–	0	4	–	3	–	0
Clemson	3	–	3	–	0	4	–	4	–	0
Ole Miss	2	–	2	–	0	5	–	3	–	0
Mercer	2	–	3	–	1	5	–	3	–	1
LSU	2	–	3	–	0	4	–	3	–	0
Mississippi College	1	–	4	–	0	3	–	4	–	0
Tennessee	1	–	4	–	0	4	–	4	–	0
Florida	0	–	2	–	1	5	–	2	–	1
Central University	0	–	2	–	0	4	–	5	–	0
The Citadel	0	–	3	–	0	2	–	4	–	0
Howard (AL)	0	–	4	–	0	1	–	7	–	0
$ – Conference champion

The 1912 Auburn Tigers football team represented Auburn University (then called the Alabama Polytechnic Institute) in the 1912 college football season. It was the Tigers' 21st season and they competed as a member of the Southern Intercollegiate Athletic Association (SIAA). The team was led by head coach Mike Donahue, in his eighth year, and played their home games at Drake Field in Auburn, Alabama. They finished with a record of six wins, one loss and one tie (6–1–1 overall).

== Schedule ==
Date	Opponent	Site	Result	Source
October 5	vs. Mercer	Driving Park; Columbus, GA	W 56–0	
October 12	Florida	Drake Field; Auburn, AL (rivalry)	W 27–13	
October 19	Clemson	Drake Field; Auburn, AL (rivalry)	W 26–7	
October 26	Mississippi A&M	Rickwood Field; Birmingham, AL	W 7–0	
November 2	at Georgia Tech	The Flats; Atlanta, GA (rivalry)	W 27–7	
November 9	vs. LSU	Monroe Park; Mobile, AL (rivalry)	W 7–0	
November 23	Vanderbilt	Rickwood Field; Birmingham, AL	T 7–7	
November 28	at Georgia	Sanford Field; Athens, GA (rivalry)	L 6–12	
