= 1912 Alabama Crimson Tide football team =

American college football season

1912 Alabama Crimson Tide football
- Conference: Southern Intercollegiate Athletic Association
- Record: 5–3–1 (3–3–1 SIAA)
- Head coach: D. V. Graves (2nd season)
- Captain: Farley Moody
- Home stadium: The Quad; Rickwood Field

1912 Southern Intercollegiate Athletic Association football standings
	Conf.					Overall
Team	W		L		T	W		L		T
Vanderbilt $	3	–	0	–	1	8	–	1	–	1
Texas A&M	2	–	0	–	0	8	–	1	–	0
Kentucky State	1	–	0	–	0	7	–	2	–	0
Auburn	6	–	1	–	1	6	–	1	–	1
Georgia	5	–	1	–	1	6	–	1	–	1
Sewanee	2	–	1	–	2	5	–	1	–	2
Georgia Tech	5	–	3	–	0	5	–	3	–	1
Alabama	3	–	3	–	1	5	–	3	–	1
Tulane	3	–	3	–	0	5	–	3	–	0
Mississippi A&M	3	–	3	–	0	4	–	3	–	0
Clemson	3	–	3	–	0	4	–	4	–	0
Ole Miss	2	–	2	–	0	5	–	3	–	0
Mercer	2	–	3	–	1	5	–	3	–	1
LSU	2	–	3	–	0	4	–	3	–	0
Mississippi College	1	–	4	–	0	3	–	4	–	0
Tennessee	1	–	4	–	0	4	–	4	–	0
Florida	0	–	2	–	1	5	–	2	–	1
Central University	0	–	2	–	0	4	–	5	–	0
The Citadel	0	–	3	–	0	2	–	4	–	0
Howard (AL)	0	–	4	–	0	1	–	7	–	0
$ – Conference champion

The 1912 Alabama Crimson Tide football team (variously "Alabama", "UA", or "Bama") represented the University of Alabama in the 1912 Southern Intercollegiate Athletic Association football season. It was the Crimson Tide's 20th overall and 17th season as a member of the Southern Intercollegiate Athletic Association (SIAA). The team was led by head coach D. V. Graves, in his second year, and played their home games at the University of Alabama Quad in Tuscaloosa and at Rickwood Field in Birmingham, Alabama, US. They finished the season with a record of five wins, three losses, and one tie (5–3–1 overall, 3–3–1 in the SIAA).

== Schedule ==
Date	Opponent	Site	Result	Source
September 28	Marion*	The Quad; Tuscaloosa, AL	W 52–0	
October 5	Birmingham*	The Quad; Tuscaloosa, AL	W 62–0	
October 12	at Georgia Tech	The Flats; Atlanta, GA (rivalry)	L 3–20	
October 18	at Mississippi A&M	Monroe County Fairgrounds; Aberdeen, MS (rivalry)	L 0–7	
October 26	at Georgia	Driving Park; Columbus, GA (rivalry)	L 9–13	
November 2	at Tulane	First Tulane Stadium; New Orleans, LA	W 7–0	
November 9	Ole Miss	The Quad; Tuscaloosa, AL (rivalry)	W 10–9	
November 16	Sewanee	Rickwood Field; Birmingham, AL	T 6–6	
November 28	Tennessee	Rickwood Field; Birmingham, AL (rivalry)	W 6–0	
*Non-conference game

== Before the season ==
Farley Moody was captain of the 1912 team. Also on the team were brothers Hargrove Van de Graaff and Adrian Van de Graaff, brothers of Robert J. Van de Graaff.

== Game summaries ==
=== Marion ===
Week 1: Marion at Alabama

Team	1	2	3	4	Total
Marion	0	0	0	0	0
• Alabama	20	13	0	19	52

- Date: September 28
- Location: The Quad
  Tuscaloosa, AL

To open the 1912 season, Alabama shutout the Marion Military Institute 52–0 at The Quad in Tuscaloosa. The Crimson Tide took a 20–0 lead behind a trio of first quarter touchdowns on a pair of runs by Holt Andrews McDowell and another by Adrian Van de Graaff. They then extended their lead to 33–0 at halftime behind touchdown runs by Hargrove Van de Graaff and Charlie Joplin. After a scoreless third, Alabama scored on a trio of fourth quarter touchdowns and made the final score 52–0. The final points were scored on runs by McDowell, Hargrove Van de Graaff and W. A. Barnes.

=== Birmingham ===
In their second game of the season, Alabama shutout Birmingham College (now Birmingham–Southern College) 62–0 at The Quad. Although Adrian Van de Graaff, Charles Long and Farley Moody, the Crimson Tide thoroughly outmatched Birmingham. Touchdowns were scored by Hargrove Van de Graaff (4), Everett Wilkinson (2), Holt Andrews McDowell, Charlie Joplin and Morgan Stickney.

The starting lineup was Hargrove Van de Graaff (left end), James Gibbons (left tackle), C. M. Hamilton (left guard), C. D. Riddle (center), Julius W. Hicks (right guard), T. D. Boman (right tackle), Raymond Jones (right end), Charlie Joplin (quarterback), J. H. G. Riley (left halfback), Holt Andrews McDowell (right halfback), Everett Wilkinson (fullback).

=== Georgia Tech ===
One source claims Tech athlete Al Loeb "is best remembered for the 1912 Tech-Alabama game." The Tide were favored and outweighed the Tech team.

Loeb gave a rousing pep talk before the game. Coach John Heisman said "I think Loeb's speech did it. I've never seen madder playing than Al Loeb did that day and inspired by him, we won." Loeb broke three fingers during the game, but had the doctor tape them up and returned to the fray to lead Tech to a 20–3 victory. Loeb recalled "They were supposed to write their own score. We licked 'em 20-3. 'Tis said I didn't miss a tackle all day. And there were plenty of 'em made... Also, coach John Heisman had a heavy shift that left me on the end so I was eligible as a pass receiver. I caught a couple, too...I was also called upon to do a bit of blocking. We ran series plays, three or four consecutively. We had no huddle -- just lined up, and without a signal we were gone. It seemed just a bit speedier than at present."

The starting lineup was: H. Vandergraaf (left end), Grady (left tacle), Hamilton (left guard), Riddle (center), Hicks (right guard), Barnes (right tackle), Wilkinson (right end), A. Vandergraaf (left halfback), McDowell (right halfback), Stickney (fullback).

=== Mississippi A&M ===
Alabama had its second consecutive SIAA loss over Mississippi A&M (now Mississippi State University).

=== Georgia ===
In the Georgia game, the Bulldogs ran a trick play in which they threw the ball to a receiver who was dressed as a waterboy, on the field, carrying a bucket. The play did not prove decisive, as Georgia fumbled the ball away soon after, but the Bulldogs won the game after they recovered a botched Alabama field goal and scored in the final minutes. Coach Graves accused Coach Cunningham of violating the ethics of the game.

=== Tulane ===
Alabama had a 7–0 victory over Tulane. A 35-yard run by Vandergraaf set up a short touchdown run by Stickney.

=== Ole Miss ===
Alabama beat Ole Miss 10–9 after the Rebels missed an extra point and two late field goals.

=== Tennessee ===
The last win of the year came over Tennessee.

=== Sewanee ===
The Tide finished the season with a surprising tie against Sewanee in what was the first Alabama football game played at Rickwood Field. "There was a saying in the South that all Sewanee had to do to defeat Alabama was to show the Alabamians a purple jersey."

== Postseason ==
Moody was selected All-Southern. He died in France while serving in the First World War during the Battle of the Argonne Forest just a month before the Armistice.
