= 1912 Mississippi A&M Aggies football team =

American college football season

1912 Mississippi A&M Aggies football
- Conference: Southern Intercollegiate Athletic Association
- Record: 4–3 (3–3 SIAA)
- Head coach: W. D. Chadwick (4th season)
- Home stadium: Hardy Field

1912 Southern Intercollegiate Athletic Association football standings
	Conf.					Overall
Team	W		L		T	W		L		T
Vanderbilt $	3	–	0	–	1	8	–	1	–	1
Texas A&M	2	–	0	–	0	8	–	1	–	0
Kentucky State	1	–	0	–	0	7	–	2	–	0
Auburn	6	–	1	–	1	6	–	1	–	1
Georgia	5	–	1	–	1	6	–	1	–	1
Sewanee	2	–	1	–	2	5	–	1	–	2
Georgia Tech	5	–	3	–	0	5	–	3	–	1
Alabama	3	–	3	–	1	5	–	3	–	1
Tulane	3	–	3	–	0	5	–	3	–	0
Mississippi A&M	3	–	3	–	0	4	–	3	–	0
Clemson	3	–	3	–	0	4	–	4	–	0
Ole Miss	2	–	2	–	0	5	–	3	–	0
Mercer	2	–	3	–	1	5	–	3	–	1
LSU	2	–	3	–	0	4	–	3	–	0
Mississippi College	1	–	4	–	0	3	–	4	–	0
Tennessee	1	–	4	–	0	4	–	4	–	0
Florida	0	–	2	–	1	5	–	2	–	1
Central University	0	–	2	–	0	4	–	5	–	0
The Citadel	0	–	3	–	0	2	–	4	–	0
Howard (AL)	0	–	4	–	0	1	–	7	–	0
$ – Conference champion

The 1912 Mississippi A&M Aggies football team represented The Agricultural and Mechanical College of the State of Mississippi (now known as Mississippi State University) as a member of the Southern Intercollegiate Athletic Association (SIAA) during the 1912 college football season. Led by fourth-year head coach W. D. Chadwick, the Aggies compiled an overall record of 4–3, with a mark of 3–3 in conference play. Mississippi A&M played home games at the Hardy Field in Starkville, Mississippi. Fullback Paul A. Reule was All-Southern.

== Schedule ==
Date	Opponent	Site	Result	Source
October 4	Mississippi College	Hardy Field; Starkville, MS	W 19–0	
October 12	Tennessee Docs*	Hardy Field; Starkville, MS	W 32–0	
October 18	Alabama	Aberdeen, MS (rivalry)	W 7–0	
October 26	at Auburn	Rickwood Field; Birmingham, AL	L 0–7	
November 2	at LSU	State Field; Baton Rouge, LA (rivalry)	W 7–0	
November 9	at Tulane	Tulane Stadium; New Orleans, LA	L 24–27	
November 16	at Texas A&M	Kyle Field; College Station, TX	L 7–41	
*Non-conference game
