= 1912 Sewanee Tigers football team =

American college football season

1912 Sewanee Tigers football
- Conference: Southern Intercollegiate Athletic Association
- Record: 5–1–2 (2–1–2 SIAA)
- Head coach: Harris G. Cope (4th season)
- Captain: Jenks Gillem
- Home stadium: Hardee Field

1912 Southern Intercollegiate Athletic Association football standings
| | Conf. | | | | | Overall |
| Team | W | | L | | T | W | | L | | T |
|---|---|---|---|---|---|---|---|---|---|---|
| Vanderbilt $ | 3 | – | 0 | – | 1 | 8 | – | 1 | – | 1 |
| Texas A&M | 2 | – | 0 | – | 0 | 8 | – | 1 | – | 0 |
| Kentucky State | 1 | – | 0 | – | 0 | 7 | – | 2 | – | 0 |
| Auburn | 6 | – | 1 | – | 1 | 6 | – | 1 | – | 1 |
| Georgia | 5 | – | 1 | – | 1 | 6 | – | 1 | – | 1 |
| Sewanee | 2 | – | 1 | – | 2 | 5 | – | 1 | – | 2 |
| Georgia Tech | 5 | – | 3 | – | 0 | 5 | – | 3 | – | 1 |
| Alabama | 3 | – | 3 | – | 1 | 5 | – | 3 | – | 1 |
| Tulane | 3 | – | 3 | – | 0 | 5 | – | 3 | – | 0 |
| Mississippi A&M | 3 | – | 3 | – | 0 | 4 | – | 3 | – | 0 |
| Clemson | 3 | – | 3 | – | 0 | 4 | – | 4 | – | 0 |
| Ole Miss | 2 | – | 2 | – | 0 | 5 | – | 3 | – | 0 |
| Mercer | 2 | – | 3 | – | 1 | 5 | – | 3 | – | 1 |
| LSU | 2 | – | 3 | – | 0 | 4 | – | 3 | – | 0 |
| Mississippi College | 1 | – | 4 | – | 0 | 3 | – | 4 | – | 0 |
| Tennessee | 1 | – | 4 | – | 0 | 4 | – | 4 | – | 0 |
| Florida | 0 | – | 2 | – | 1 | 5 | – | 2 | – | 1 |
| Central University | 0 | – | 2 | – | 0 | 4 | – | 5 | – | 0 |
| The Citadel | 0 | – | 3 | – | 0 | 2 | – | 4 | – | 0 |
| Howard (AL) | 0 | – | 4 | – | 0 | 1 | – | 7 | – | 0 |
$ – Conference champion

The 1912 Sewanee Tigers football team represented Sewanee: The University of the South during the 1912 college football season as a member of the Southern Intercollegiate Athletic Association (SIAA). The Tigers were led by head coach Harris G. Cope in his fourth season and finished with a record of five wins, one loss, and two ties (5–1–2 overall, 2–1–2 in the SIAA).

== Schedule ==
| Date | Opponent | Site | Result | Attendance | Source |
|---|---|---|---|---|---|
| October 9 | Morgan Training School* | Hardee Field; Sewanee, TN | W 34–0 | | |
| October 12 | Florence State Normal* | Hardee Field; Sewanee, TN | W 101–0 | | |
| October 19 | Chattanooga* | Hardee Field; Sewanee, TN | W 27–0 | | |
| October 26 | vs. Tennessee | Chamberlain Field; Chattanooga, TN | W 33–6 | | |
| November 2 | at Georgia | Sanford Field; Athens, GA | T 13–13 | | |
| November 9 | at Georgia Tech | The Flats; Atlanta, GA | W 7–0 | | |
| November 16 | at Alabama | Rickwood Field; Birmingham, AL | T 6–6 | | |
| November 28 | at Vanderbilt | Dudley Field; Nashville, TN (rivalry) | L 0–16 | 10,000 | |
*Non-conference game
