= 1912 Tulane Olive and Blue football team =

American college football season

1912 Tulane Olive and Blue football
- Conference: Southern Intercollegiate Athletic Association
- Record: 5–3 (3–3 SIAA)
- Head coach: Appleton A. Mason (3rd season)
- Captain: Gaylord McLeod
- Home stadium: First Tulane Stadium

1912 Southern Intercollegiate Athletic Association football standings
	Conf.					Overall
Team	W		L		T	W		L		T
Vanderbilt $	3	–	0	–	1	8	–	1	–	1
Texas A&M	2	–	0	–	0	8	–	1	–	0
Kentucky State	1	–	0	–	0	7	–	2	–	0
Auburn	6	–	1	–	1	6	–	1	–	1
Georgia	5	–	1	–	1	6	–	1	–	1
Sewanee	2	–	1	–	2	5	–	1	–	2
Georgia Tech	5	–	3	–	0	5	–	3	–	1
Alabama	3	–	3	–	1	5	–	3	–	1
Tulane	3	–	3	–	0	5	–	3	–	0
Mississippi A&M	3	–	3	–	0	4	–	3	–	0
Clemson	3	–	3	–	0	4	–	4	–	0
Ole Miss	2	–	2	–	0	5	–	3	–	0
Mercer	2	–	3	–	1	5	–	3	–	1
LSU	2	–	3	–	0	4	–	3	–	0
Mississippi College	1	–	4	–	0	3	–	4	–	0
Tennessee	1	–	4	–	0	4	–	4	–	0
Florida	0	–	2	–	1	5	–	2	–	1
Central University	0	–	2	–	0	4	–	5	–	0
The Citadel	0	–	3	–	0	2	–	4	–	0
Howard (AL)	0	–	4	–	0	1	–	7	–	0
$ – Conference champion

The 1912 Tulane Olive and Blue football team was an American football team that represented Tulane University as a member of the Southern Intercollegiate Athletic Association (SIAA) during the 1912 college football season. In its third year under head coach Appleton A. Mason, Tulane compiled a 5–3 record.

== Schedule ==
Date	Opponent	Site	Result	Source
October 8	Jefferson College (LA)*	Tulane Stadium; New Orleans, LA	W 37–0	
October 12	Southwestern Louisiana*	Tulane Stadium; New Orleans, LA	W 95–0	
October 19	Mississippi College	Tulane Stadium; New Orleans, LA	W 19–6	
October 26	Howard (AL)	Tulane Stadium; New Orleans, LA	W 35–0	
November 2	Alabama	Tulane Stadium; New Orleans, LA	L 0–7	
November 9	Mississippi A&M	Tulane Stadium; New Orleans, LA	W 27–24	
November 19	at Texas A&M	Kyle Field; College Station, TX	L 0–41	
November 28	LSU	Tulane Stadium; New Orleans, LA (rivalry)	L 3–21	
*Non-conference game
