= 1912 Texas A&M Aggies football team =

American college football season

1912 Texas A&M Aggies football

TIAA champion
- Conference: Southern Intercollegiate Athletic Association, Texas Intercollegiate Athletic Association
- Record: 8–1 (4–0 TIAA)
- Head coach: Charley Moran (4th season)
- Captain: Tyree Bell
- Home stadium: Kyle Field

1912 Southern Intercollegiate Athletic Association football standings
	Conf.					Overall
Team	W		L		T	W		L		T
Vanderbilt $	3	–	0	–	1	8	–	1	–	1
Texas A&M	2	–	0	–	0	8	–	1	–	0
Kentucky State	1	–	0	–	0	7	–	2	–	0
Auburn	6	–	1	–	1	6	–	1	–	1
Georgia	5	–	1	–	1	6	–	1	–	1
Sewanee	2	–	1	–	2	5	–	1	–	2
Georgia Tech	5	–	3	–	0	5	–	3	–	1
Alabama	3	–	3	–	1	5	–	3	–	1
Tulane	3	–	3	–	0	5	–	3	–	0
Mississippi A&M	3	–	3	–	0	4	–	3	–	0
Clemson	3	–	3	–	0	4	–	4	–	0
Ole Miss	2	–	2	–	0	5	–	3	–	0
Mercer	2	–	3	–	1	5	–	3	–	1
LSU	2	–	3	–	0	4	–	3	–	0
Mississippi College	1	–	4	–	0	3	–	4	–	0
Tennessee	1	–	4	–	0	4	–	4	–	0
Florida	0	–	2	–	1	5	–	2	–	1
Central University	0	–	2	–	0	4	–	5	–	0
The Citadel	0	–	3	–	0	2	–	4	–	0
Howard (AL)	0	–	4	–	0	1	–	7	–	0
$ – Conference champion

1912 Texas Intercollegiate Athletic Association football standings
	Conf.					Overall
Team	W		L		T	W		L		T
Texas A&M $	4	–	0	–	0	8	–	1	–	0
Texas	4	–	0	–	0	7	–	1	–	0
TCU	7	–	1	–	0	8	–	1	–	0
Southwestern (TX)	3	–	2	–	0	3	–	3	–	0
Daniel Baker	3	–	2	–	2	3	–	2	–	2
Austin	3	–	3	–	0	4	–	3	–	0
Baylor	2	–	5	–	0	3	–	5	–	0
Polytechnic (TX)	1	–	5	–	1	1	–	5	–	1
Trinity (TX)	0	–	7	–	0	0	–	7	–	0
$ – Conference champion

The 1912 Texas A&M Aggies football team represented the Agricultural and Mechanical College of Texas—now known as Texas A&M University—as a member of the Southern Intercollegiate Athletic Association (SIAA) during the 1912 college football season. In their fourth year under head coach Charley Moran, the Aggies compiled an overall record of 8–0 with a conference mark of 2–0, finishing second in the SIAA.

== Schedule ==
Date	Time	Opponent	Site	Result	Attendance	Source
October 12		Daniel Baker*	Kyle Field; College Station, TX	W 50–0		
October 18		Trinity (TX)*	Kyle Field; College Station, TX	W 59–0		
October 26		vs. Arkansas*	State Fairgrounds; Dallas, TX (rivalry)	W 27–0		
November 1		Austin*	Kyle Field; College Station, TX	W 57–0		
November 11	3:15 p.m.	vs. Oklahoma*	West End Park; Houston, TX	W 28–6	6,000	
November 16		Mississippi A&M	Kyle Field; College Station, TX	W 41–7		
November 19		Tulane	Kyle Field; College Station, TX	W 41–0		
November 22		Kansas State*	Kyle Field; College Station, TX	L 10–13		
November 28		vs. Baylor*	Gaston Park; Dallas, TX (rivalry)	W 53–0		
*Non-conference game
