= 1912 The Citadel Bulldogs football team =

American college football season

1912 The Citadel Bulldogs football
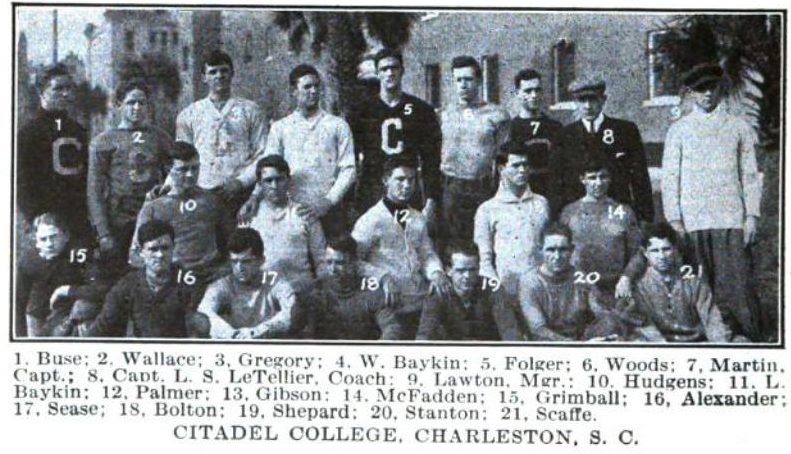
- Conference: Southern Intercollegiate Athletic Association
- Record: 3–4 (0–3 SIAA)
- Head coach: Louis LeTellier (2nd season)
- Captain: John Martin
- Home stadium: College Park Stadium

1912 Southern Intercollegiate Athletic Association football standings
	Conf.					Overall
Team	W		L		T	W		L		T
Vanderbilt $	3	–	0	–	1	8	–	1	–	1
Texas A&M	2	–	0	–	0	8	–	1	–	0
Kentucky State	1	–	0	–	0	7	–	2	–	0
Auburn	6	–	1	–	1	6	–	1	–	1
Georgia	5	–	1	–	1	6	–	1	–	1
Sewanee	2	–	1	–	2	5	–	1	–	2
Georgia Tech	5	–	3	–	0	5	–	3	–	1
Alabama	3	–	3	–	1	5	–	3	–	1
Tulane	3	–	3	–	0	5	–	3	–	0
Mississippi A&M	3	–	3	–	0	4	–	3	–	0
Clemson	3	–	3	–	0	4	–	4	–	0
Ole Miss	2	–	2	–	0	5	–	3	–	0
Mercer	2	–	3	–	1	5	–	3	–	1
LSU	2	–	3	–	0	4	–	3	–	0
Mississippi College	1	–	4	–	0	3	–	4	–	0
Tennessee	1	–	4	–	0	4	–	4	–	0
Florida	0	–	2	–	1	5	–	2	–	1
Central University	0	–	2	–	0	4	–	5	–	0
The Citadel	0	–	3	–	0	2	–	4	–	0
Howard (AL)	0	–	4	–	0	1	–	7	–	0
$ – Conference champion

The 1912 The Citadel Bulldogs football team represented The Citadel as a member of the Southern Intercollegiate Athletic Association (SIAA) during the 1912 college football season. This was the eighth year of intercollegiate football at The Citadel, with Louis LeTellier serving as coach for the second season. All home games are believed to have been played at College Park Stadium in Hampton Park.

== Schedule ==
Date	Opponent	Site	Result	Source
September 28	Fort Moultrie*	College Park Stadium; Charleston, SC	W 1–0 (Note: The Citadel won by forfeit)	
October 5	Georgia Tech	College Park Stadium; Charleston, SC	L 6–20	
October 12	at Georgia	Sanford Field; Athens, GA	L 0–33	
October 19	Porter Military Academy*	College Park Stadium; Charleston, SC	W 66–0	
October 26	at Clemson	Bowman Field; Calhoun, SC	L 14–52	
November 16	College of Charleston*	College Park Stadium; Charleston, SC	W 40–0	
November 28	at South Carolina*	Davis Field; Columbia, SC	L 2–26	
*Non-conference game
