= 1912 Mercer Baptists football team =

American college football season

1912 Mercer Baptists football
- Conference: Southern Intercollegiate Athletic Association
- Record: 5–3–1 (2–3–1 SIAA)
- Head coach: Charles C. Stroud (3rd season)
- Home stadium: Central City Park

1912 Southern Intercollegiate Athletic Association football standings
	Conf.					Overall
Team	W		L		T	W		L		T
Vanderbilt $	3	–	0	–	1	8	–	1	–	1
Texas A&M	2	–	0	–	0	8	–	1	–	0
Kentucky State	1	–	0	–	0	7	–	2	–	0
Auburn	6	–	1	–	1	6	–	1	–	1
Georgia	5	–	1	–	1	6	–	1	–	1
Sewanee	2	–	1	–	2	5	–	1	–	2
Georgia Tech	5	–	3	–	0	5	–	3	–	1
Alabama	3	–	3	–	1	5	–	3	–	1
Tulane	3	–	3	–	0	5	–	3	–	0
Mississippi A&M	3	–	3	–	0	4	–	3	–	0
Clemson	3	–	3	–	0	4	–	4	–	0
Ole Miss	2	–	2	–	0	5	–	3	–	0
Mercer	2	–	3	–	1	5	–	3	–	1
LSU	2	–	3	–	0	4	–	3	–	0
Mississippi College	1	–	4	–	0	3	–	4	–	0
Tennessee	1	–	4	–	0	4	–	4	–	0
Florida	0	–	2	–	1	5	–	2	–	1
Central University	0	–	2	–	0	4	–	5	–	0
The Citadel	0	–	3	–	0	2	–	4	–	0
Howard (AL)	0	–	4	–	0	1	–	7	–	0
$ – Conference champion

The 1912 Mercer Baptists football team was an American football team that represented Mercer University as a member of the Southern Intercollegiate Athletic Association (SIAA) during the 1912 college football season. In their third year under head coach Charles C. Stroud, the team compiled an 5–3–1 record, with a mark of 2–3–1 in the SIAA.

== Schedule ==
Date	Opponent	Site	Result	Source
September 28	Gordon Institute	Central City Park; Macon, GA	W 29–6	
October 5	vs. Auburn	Driving Park; Columbus, GA	L 0–56	
October 12	at Howard (AL)	Alabama State Fairgrounds; Birmingham, AL	W 36–0	
October 19	Georgia Tech	Central City Park; Macon, GA	L 0–16	
October 26	vs. Stetson	Waycross, GA	W 6–0	
November 2	vs. Columbia College (FL)	Valdosta, GA	W 71–0	
November 9	Tennessee	Central City Park; Macon, GA	W 27–14	
November 16	Clemson	Central City Park; Macon, GA	L 13–21	
November 28	vs. Florida	Jacksonville, FL	T 0–0	
