= 1912 LSU Tigers football team =

American college football season

1912 LSU Tigers football
- Conference: Southern Intercollegiate Athletic Association
- Record: 4–3 (2–3 SIAA)
- Head coach: Pat Dwyer (2nd season)
- Captain: Charles S. Reiley
- Home stadium: State Field

1912 Southern Intercollegiate Athletic Association football standings
	Conf.					Overall
Team	W		L		T	W		L		T
Vanderbilt $	3	–	0	–	1	8	–	1	–	1
Texas A&M	2	–	0	–	0	8	–	1	–	0
Kentucky State	1	–	0	–	0	7	–	2	–	0
Auburn	6	–	1	–	1	6	–	1	–	1
Georgia	5	–	1	–	1	6	–	1	–	1
Sewanee	2	–	1	–	2	5	–	1	–	2
Georgia Tech	5	–	3	–	0	5	–	3	–	1
Alabama	3	–	3	–	1	5	–	3	–	1
Tulane	3	–	3	–	0	5	–	3	–	0
Mississippi A&M	3	–	3	–	0	4	–	3	–	0
Clemson	3	–	3	–	0	4	–	4	–	0
Ole Miss	2	–	2	–	0	5	–	3	–	0
Mercer	2	–	3	–	1	5	–	3	–	1
LSU	2	–	3	–	0	4	–	3	–	0
Mississippi College	1	–	4	–	0	3	–	4	–	0
Tennessee	1	–	4	–	0	4	–	4	–	0
Florida	0	–	2	–	1	5	–	2	–	1
Central University	0	–	2	–	0	4	–	5	–	0
The Citadel	0	–	3	–	0	2	–	4	–	0
Howard (AL)	0	–	4	–	0	1	–	7	–	0
$ – Conference champion

The 1912 LSU Tigers football team represented Louisiana State University (LSU) as a member of the Southern Intercollegiate Athletic Association (SIAA) during the 1912 college football season. Led by second-year head coach Pat Dwyer, the Tigers compiled an overall record of 4–3, with a mark of 2–3 in conference play, and finished 14th in the SIAA. LSU played home games at State Field in Baton Rouge, Louisiana.

== Schedule ==
Date	Opponent	Site	Result	Source
October 5	Southwestern Louisiana*	State Field; Baton Rouge, LA	W 85–3	
October 11	Mississippi College	State Field; Baton Rouge, LA	W 45–0	
October 19	Ole Miss	State Field; Baton Rouge, LA (rivalry)	L 7–10	
November 2	Mississippi A&M	State Field; Baton Rouge, LA (rivalry)	L 0–7	
November 9	vs. Auburn	Monroe Park; Mobile, AL (rivalry)	L 0–7	
November 16	vs. Arkansas*	West End Park; Little Rock, AR (rivalry)	W 7–6	
November 28	at Tulane	Tulane Stadium; New Orleans, LA (rivalry)	W 21–3	
*Non-conference game
