= 1912 Ole Miss Rebels football team =

American college football season

1912 Ole Miss Rebels football
- Conference: Southern Intercollegiate Athletic Association
- Record: 5–3 (2–2 SIAA)
- Head coach: Leo DeTray (1st season)
- Captain: John C. Adams

1912 Southern Intercollegiate Athletic Association football standings
| | Conf. | | | | | Overall |
| Team | W | | L | | T | W | | L | | T |
|---|---|---|---|---|---|---|---|---|---|---|
| Vanderbilt $ | 3 | – | 0 | – | 1 | 8 | – | 1 | – | 1 |
| Texas A&M | 2 | – | 0 | – | 0 | 8 | – | 1 | – | 0 |
| Kentucky State | 1 | – | 0 | – | 0 | 7 | – | 2 | – | 0 |
| Auburn | 6 | – | 1 | – | 1 | 6 | – | 1 | – | 1 |
| Georgia | 5 | – | 1 | – | 1 | 6 | – | 1 | – | 1 |
| Sewanee | 2 | – | 1 | – | 2 | 5 | – | 1 | – | 2 |
| Georgia Tech | 5 | – | 3 | – | 0 | 5 | – | 3 | – | 1 |
| Alabama | 3 | – | 3 | – | 1 | 5 | – | 3 | – | 1 |
| Tulane | 3 | – | 3 | – | 0 | 5 | – | 3 | – | 0 |
| Mississippi A&M | 3 | – | 3 | – | 0 | 4 | – | 3 | – | 0 |
| Clemson | 3 | – | 3 | – | 0 | 4 | – | 4 | – | 0 |
| Ole Miss | 2 | – | 2 | – | 0 | 5 | – | 3 | – | 0 |
| Mercer | 2 | – | 3 | – | 1 | 5 | – | 3 | – | 1 |
| LSU | 2 | – | 3 | – | 0 | 4 | – | 3 | – | 0 |
| Mississippi College | 1 | – | 4 | – | 0 | 3 | – | 4 | – | 0 |
| Tennessee | 1 | – | 4 | – | 0 | 4 | – | 4 | – | 0 |
| Florida | 0 | – | 2 | – | 1 | 5 | – | 2 | – | 1 |
| Central University | 0 | – | 2 | – | 0 | 4 | – | 5 | – | 0 |
| The Citadel | 0 | – | 3 | – | 0 | 2 | – | 4 | – | 0 |
| Howard (AL) | 0 | – | 4 | – | 0 | 1 | – | 7 | – | 0 |
$ – Conference champion

The 1912 Ole Miss Rebels football team represented the University of Mississippi as a member of the Southern Intercollegiate Athletic Association (SIAA) during the 1912 college football season. Led by Leo DeTray in his first and only season as head coach, the Rebels compiled an overall record of 5–3 with a mark of 2–2 in SIAA play.

== Schedule ==
| Date | Opponent | Site | Result | Source |
|---|---|---|---|---|
| October 5 | Memphis High School* | University Field; Oxford, MS | W 34–0 | |
| October 12 | Castle Heights* | University Field; Oxford, MS | W 1–0 (forfeit) | |
| October 19 | at LSU | State Field; Baton Rouge, LA (rivalry) | W 10–7 | |
| October 26 | at Vanderbilt | Dudley Field; Nashville, TN (rivalry) | L 0–24 | |
| November 1 | Mississippi College | University Field; Oxford, MS | W 12–0 | |
| November 9 | at Alabama | The Quad; Tuscaloosa, AL (rivalry) | L 9–10 | |
| November 13 | vs. Texas* | West End Park; Houston, TX | L 14–53 | |
| November 16 | at Tennessee Docs* | Red Elm Park; Memphis, TN | W 47–6 | |
*Non-conference game

== Players ==
=== Line ===
| Player | Position | Games started | Hometown | Prep school | Height | Weight | Age |
|---|---|---|---|---|---|---|---|
| John C. Adams | center | | | | | | |
| Rube Barker | tackle | | | | | | |
| J. P. Evans | end | | | | | | |
| E. F. McCall | guard | | | | | | |
| L. D. Myers | tackle | | | | | | |
| H. A. Puryear | guard | | | | | | |
| E. S. Samuels | guard | | | | | | |
| Guy Spruhan | end | | | | | | |
| J. S. Therrell | end | | | | | | |
| W. E. Vandevere | end | | | | | | |

=== Backfield ===
| Player | Position | Games started | Hometown | Prep school | Height | Weight | Age |
|---|---|---|---|---|---|---|---|
| J. J. Breeland | halfback | | | | | | |
| David Gardner | halfback | | | | | | |
| W. G. Green | halfback | | | | | | |
| Ralph E. Fletcher | quarterback | | | | | | |
| M. F. Haralson | quarterback | | | | | | |
| I. H. Harris | fullback | | | | | | |
| R. K. Haxton | halfback | | | | | | |
| G. J. Leftwich | fullback | | | | | | |
