= Rip Major =

American football player, sports coach, and college athletics administrator (1889–1934)

Biographical details
- Born: December 26, 1889; Anderson, South Carolina, U.S.
- Died: January 21, 1934 (aged 34); Albany, Georgia, U.S.

Playing career

Football
- 1910–1912: Auburn
- Positions: Fullback, quarterback

Coaching career (HC unless noted)

Football
- 1913: Clemson (assistant)
- 1919: Wofford
- 1922–1926: Wofford

Basketball
- 1919–1920: Wofford
- 1921–1926: Wofford

Baseball
- 1919–1920: Wofford

Head coaching record
- Overall: 19–34–1 (football)

Accomplishments and honors

Awards
- All-Southern (1912)

John Perry "Rip" Major (December 26, 1889 – January 21, 1934) was an American football player, coach of football, basketball, and baseball, and college athletics administrator. He served as the head football coach at Wofford College in 1919 and again from 1922 to 1926, compiling a record of 19–34–1.

== Auburn ==
Major was a prominent running back for Mike Donahue's Auburn Tigers of Auburn University.

=== 1912 ===
Major was captain of the team in 1912. He was selected All-Southern.

== Wofford ==
Major coached the Wofford Terriers football teams of Wofford College in 1919 and from 1922 to 1926.

== Head coaching record ==
=== Football ===
Year	Team	Overall	Conference	Standing	Bowl/playoffs
Wofford Terriers (Southern Intercollegiate Athletic Association) (1919)
1919	Wofford	3–2–1	1–1	T–13th	
Wofford Terriers (Southern Intercollegiate Athletic Association) (1922–1926)
1922	Wofford	2–7	0–2	T–13th	
1923	Wofford	6–3	1–3	T–13th	
1924	Wofford	3–7	2–4	T–12th	
1925	Wofford	3–7	1–3	T–15th	
1926	Wofford	2–8	1–3	T–20th	
Wofford:		19–34–1	6–16		
Total:		19–34–1			
