= 1912 Georgia Bulldogs football team =

American college football season

1912 Georgia Bulldogs football
- Conference: Southern Intercollegiate Athletic Association
- Record: 6–1–1 (5–1–1 SIAA)
- Head coach: W. A. Cunningham (3rd season)
- Captain: David Peacock
- Home stadium: Sanford Field

1912 Southern Intercollegiate Athletic Association football standings
	Conf.					Overall
Team	W		L		T	W		L		T
Vanderbilt $	3	–	0	–	1	8	–	1	–	1
Texas A&M	2	–	0	–	0	8	–	1	–	0
Kentucky State	1	–	0	–	0	7	–	2	–	0
Auburn	6	–	1	–	1	6	–	1	–	1
Georgia	5	–	1	–	1	6	–	1	–	1
Sewanee	2	–	1	–	2	5	–	1	–	2
Georgia Tech	5	–	3	–	0	5	–	3	–	1
Alabama	3	–	3	–	1	5	–	3	–	1
Tulane	3	–	3	–	0	5	–	3	–	0
Mississippi A&M	3	–	3	–	0	4	–	3	–	0
Clemson	3	–	3	–	0	4	–	4	–	0
Ole Miss	2	–	2	–	0	5	–	3	–	0
Mercer	2	–	3	–	1	5	–	3	–	1
LSU	2	–	3	–	0	4	–	3	–	0
Mississippi College	1	–	4	–	0	3	–	4	–	0
Tennessee	1	–	4	–	0	4	–	4	–	0
Florida	0	–	2	–	1	5	–	2	–	1
Central University	0	–	2	–	0	4	–	5	–	0
The Citadel	0	–	3	–	0	2	–	4	–	0
Howard (AL)	0	–	4	–	0	1	–	7	–	0
$ – Conference champion

The 1912 Georgia Bulldogs football team represented the University of Georgia during the 1912 Southern Intercollegiate Athletic Association football season. The Bulldogs completed the season with a 6–1–1, but its 46–0 loss to Vanderbilt was a big disappointment. Vanderbilt completed its 1912 season undefeated and won its third straight SIAA conference title. The otherwise strong season also include a tie with Sewanee. Bob McWhorter continued to overpower Georgia's opponents.

== Schedule ==
Date	Opponent	Site	Result	Attendance	Source
October 5	Chattanooga*	Sanford Field; Athens, GA	W 33–0		
October 12	The Citadel	Sanford Field; Athens, GA	W 33–0		
October 19	vs. Vanderbilt	Ponce de Leon Park; Atlanta, GA (rivalry)	L 0–46	4,500	
October 26	vs. Alabama	Driving Park; Columbus, GA (rivalry)	W 13–9		
November 2	Sewanee	Sanford Field; Athens, GA	T 13–13		
November 7	vs. Clemson	Augusta, GA (rivalry)	W 27–6		
November 16	at Georgia Tech	The Flats; Atlanta, GA (rivalry)	W 20–0		
November 28	Auburn	Sanford Field; Athens, GA (rivalry)	W 12–6		
*Non-conference game
