= 1912 State Normal Lions football team =

American college football season

1912 State Normal Lions football
- Conference: Independent
- Record: 1–1
- Head coach: A. H. Wilds (1st season)

The 1912 State Normal Lions football team represented the State Normal School of Florence—now known as the University of North Alabama— during the 1912 college football season. Led by head coach A. H. Wilds, the Lions compiled an overall record of 1–1.

== Schedule ==
Date	Time	Opponent	Site	Result	Source
October 12		at Sewanee	Hardee Field; Sewanee, TN	L 0–101	
October 26	3:30 p.m.	West Alabama Agricultural School of Hamilton	Local Grounds; Florence, AL	W 65–0	

== Personnel ==
=== Roster ===
Player	Position
Joe Stutts	Right End
Henry Kitchens	Right Tackle
Lee Glenn	Left End
Ike Rogers	Left Half
Joe Game	Quarterback
Edgar Jackson	Substitute
Tom Snow	Right Guard
Guy Burns	Center
Oliver Kilburn	Fullback
Clarence Hester	Right Half
Doc Jones	Left Tackle
Bunyan Hodges	Right End
Howard Harris	Left Guard
Jesse Hyde	Left Tackle
James Kilburn	Quarterback
Hiram Hyde	Left Guard
Jno. Darby	Left Half

=== Coaching staff ===
Head coach

- A. H. Wilds

Additional Staff

- Bill Linsey - Mascot
