= John C. Adams =

American football player and physician (1887–1969)

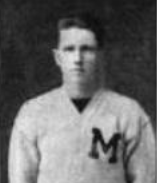

Profile
- Position: Center

Personal information
- Born: March 2, 1887; Kosciusko, Mississippi, U.S.
- Died: August 28, 1969 (aged 82); Natchez, Mississippi, U.S.
- Listed height: 6 ft 1 in (1.85 m)
- Listed weight: 180 lb (82 kg)

Career information
- College: Ole Miss (1909–1912)

Awards and highlights
- All-Southern (1912)

John Charles "Red" Adams (March 2, 1887 – August 28, 1969) was an American college football player and physician.

== University of Mississippi ==
He was a prominent center for the Ole Miss Rebels football team of the University of Mississippi. Adams was nominated though not selected for an Associated Press All-Time Southeast 1869-1919 era team.

=== 1912 ===
Adams was captain of the 1912 team. He was selected All-Southern by Nathan Stauffer of Collier's Weekly.

== Physician ==
During World War I, he worked for Standard Oil in Maricopa, California. He was later a doctor in Greenwood. In 1924, he married Vivian Muller in New Orleans.
