= 1912 Clemson Tigers football team =

American college football season

1912 Clemson Tigers football
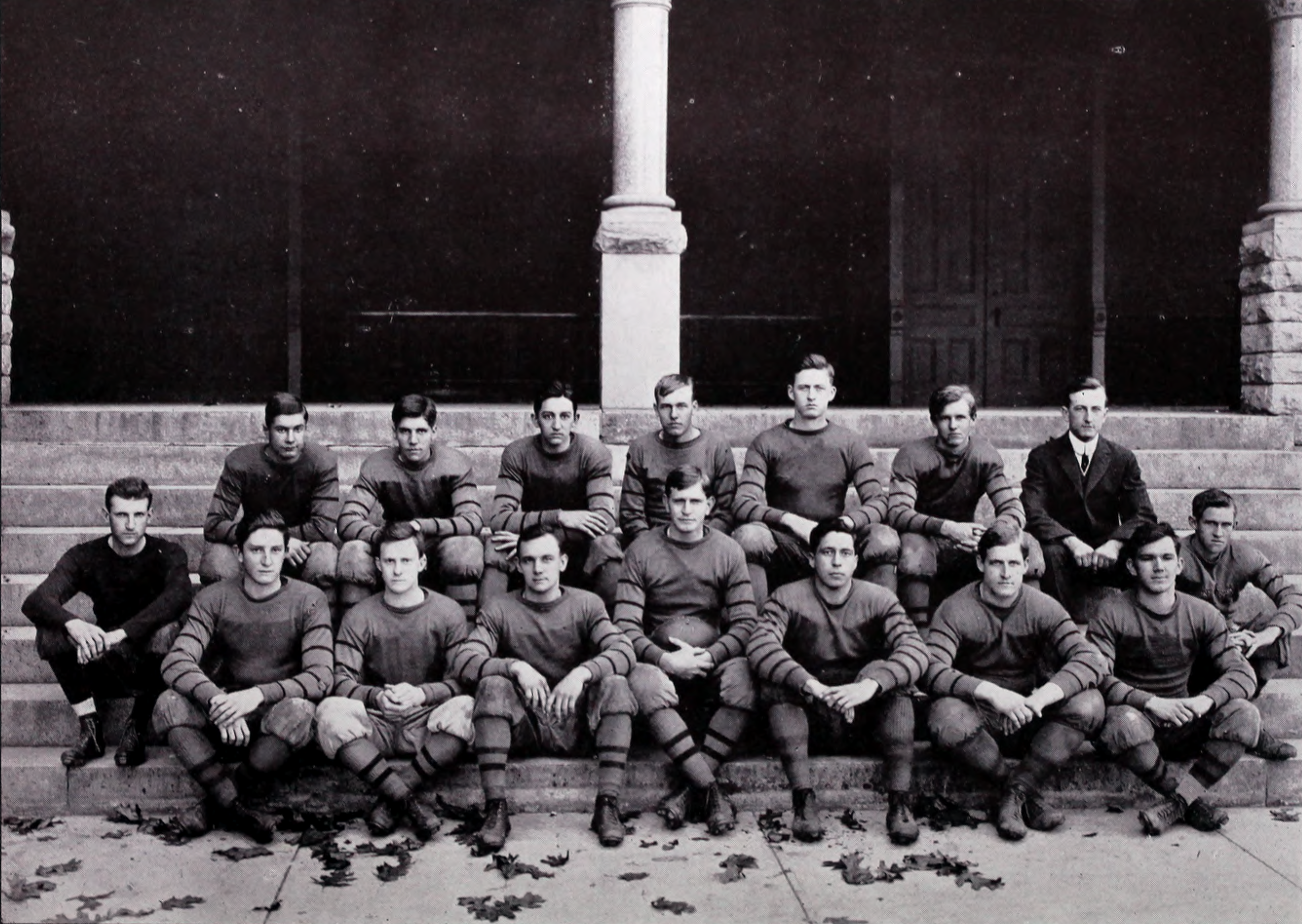
- Conference: Southern Intercollegiate Athletic Association
- Record: 4–4 (3–3 SIAA)
- Head coach: Frank Dobson (3rd season)
- Captain: W. B. Britt
- Home stadium: Bowman Field

1912 Southern Intercollegiate Athletic Association football standings
	Conf.					Overall
Team	W		L		T	W		L		T
Vanderbilt $	3	–	0	–	1	8	–	1	–	1
Texas A&M	2	–	0	–	0	8	–	1	–	0
Kentucky State	1	–	0	–	0	7	–	2	–	0
Auburn	6	–	1	–	1	6	–	1	–	1
Georgia	5	–	1	–	1	6	–	1	–	1
Sewanee	2	–	1	–	2	5	–	1	–	2
Georgia Tech	5	–	3	–	0	5	–	3	–	1
Alabama	3	–	3	–	1	5	–	3	–	1
Tulane	3	–	3	–	0	5	–	3	–	0
Mississippi A&M	3	–	3	–	0	4	–	3	–	0
Clemson	3	–	3	–	0	4	–	4	–	0
Ole Miss	2	–	2	–	0	5	–	3	–	0
Mercer	2	–	3	–	1	5	–	3	–	1
LSU	2	–	3	–	0	4	–	3	–	0
Mississippi College	1	–	4	–	0	3	–	4	–	0
Tennessee	1	–	4	–	0	4	–	4	–	0
Florida	0	–	2	–	1	5	–	2	–	1
Central University	0	–	2	–	0	4	–	5	–	0
The Citadel	0	–	3	–	0	2	–	4	–	0
Howard (AL)	0	–	4	–	0	1	–	7	–	0
$ – Conference champion

The 1912 Clemson Tigers football team represented Clemson Agricultural College—now known as Clemson University—as a member of the Southern Intercollegiate Athletic Association (SIAA) during the 1912 college football season. Led by Frank Dobson in his third and final season a head coach, the team compiled an overall record of 4–4 with a mark of 3–3 in SIAA team. W. B. Britt was the team captain.

== Schedule ==
Date	Opponent	Site	Result	Attendance	Source
October 5	at Howard (AL)	Alabama State Fairgrounds; Birmingham, AL	W 59–0		
October 12	Riverside Military Academy*	Bowman Field; Calhoun, SC	W 26–0		
October 19	at Auburn	Drake Field; Auburn, AL (rivalry)	L 6–27		
October 26	The Citadel	Bowman Field; Calhoun, SC	W 52–14		
October 31	at South Carolina*	State Fairgrounds; Columbia, SC (rivalry)	L 7–22	3,500	
November 7	vs. Georgia	Augusta, GA (rivalry)	L 5–27		
November 16	at Mercer	Central City Park; Macon, GA	W 21–13		
November 28	at Georgia Tech	The Flats; Atlanta, GA (rivalry)	L 0–23		
*Non-conference game
