= Louis LeTellier =

American football coach and university instructor and administrator

Biographical details
- Born: February 8, 1887; Charlottesville, Virginia, U.S.
- Died: July 2, 1975 (aged 88); Jacksonville, Florida, U.S.

Coaching career (HC unless noted)
- 1911–1912: The Citadel

Head coaching record
- Overall: 8–6–2

Louis Shepherd LeTellier (February 8, 1887 – July 2, 1975) was an American football coach and university instructor and administrator. He was the fourth head football coach at The Citadel, serving for two seasons, from 1911 to 1912, and compiling a record of 8–6–2.

LeTellier was an instructor in the Engineering department and later became head of the Civil Engineering Department. He served as interim President of The Citadel from the time of General Charles P. Summerall's departure in 1953 until General Mark W. Clark's arrival in 1954. The current home of the Civil Engineering Department at The Citadel, LeTellier Hall, is named for him.

== Head coaching record ==
Year	Team	Overall	Conference	Standing	Bowl/playoffs
The Citadel Bulldogs (Southern Intercollegiate Athletic Association) (1911–1912)
1911	The Citadel	5–2–2	1–2		
1912	The Citadel	3–4	0–3		
The Citadel:		8–6–2	1–5		
Total:		8–6–2			
