= 1912 Kentucky State College Wildcats football team =

American college football season

1912 Kentucky State College Wildcats football
- Conference: Southern Intercollegiate Athletic Association
- Record: 7–2 (1–0 SIAA)
- Head coach: Edwin Sweetland (3rd season)
- Captain: W. C. Harrison
- Home stadium: Stoll Field

1912 Southern Intercollegiate Athletic Association football standings
	Conf.					Overall
Team	W		L		T	W		L		T
Vanderbilt $	3	–	0	–	1	8	–	1	–	1
Texas A&M	2	–	0	–	0	8	–	1	–	0
Kentucky State	1	–	0	–	0	7	–	2	–	0
Auburn	6	–	1	–	1	6	–	1	–	1
Georgia	5	–	1	–	1	6	–	1	–	1
Sewanee	2	–	1	–	2	5	–	1	–	2
Georgia Tech	5	–	3	–	0	5	–	3	–	1
Alabama	3	–	3	–	1	5	–	3	–	1
Tulane	3	–	3	–	0	5	–	3	–	0
Mississippi A&M	3	–	3	–	0	4	–	3	–	0
Clemson	3	–	3	–	0	4	–	4	–	0
Ole Miss	2	–	2	–	0	5	–	3	–	0
Mercer	2	–	3	–	1	5	–	3	–	1
LSU	2	–	3	–	0	4	–	3	–	0
Mississippi College	1	–	4	–	0	3	–	4	–	0
Tennessee	1	–	4	–	0	4	–	4	–	0
Florida	0	–	2	–	1	5	–	2	–	1
Central University	0	–	2	–	0	4	–	5	–	0
The Citadel	0	–	3	–	0	2	–	4	–	0
Howard (AL)	0	–	4	–	0	1	–	7	–	0
$ – Conference champion

The 1912 Kentucky State College Wildcats football team represented Kentucky State College—now known as the University of Kentucky—during the 1912 Southern Intercollegiate Athletic Association football season. Led by Edwin Sweetland in his third and final season as head coach, the Wildcats compiled an overall record of 7–2 with a mark of 1–0 in SIAA play. Sweetland fired his assistant coach, Richard S. Webb, after Webb took several team members to a Knoxville red-light district after the game against Tennessee.

== Schedule ==
Date	Opponent	Site	Result	Source
September 28	Maryville (TN)*	Stoll Field; Lexington, KY	W 34–0	
October 5	Marshall*	Stoll Field; Lexington, KY	W 13–6	
October 12	Miami (OH)*	Stoll Field; Lexington, KY	L 8–13	
October 19	at Cincinnati*	Carson Field; Cincinnati, OH	W 19–13	
October 26	Louisville*	Stoll Field; Lexington, KY (rivalry)	W 41–0	
November 2	VMI*	Stoll Field; Lexington, KY	L 2–3	
November 9	Hanover*	Stoll Field; Lexington, KY	W 64–0	
November 16	at Tennessee	Waite Field; Knoxville, TN (rivalry)	W 13–6	
November 28	Cincinnati YMI*	Stoll Field; Lexington, KY	W 56–0	
*Non-conference game
