= 1912 Georgia Tech Yellow Jackets football team =

American college football season

1912 Georgia Tech Yellow Jackets football
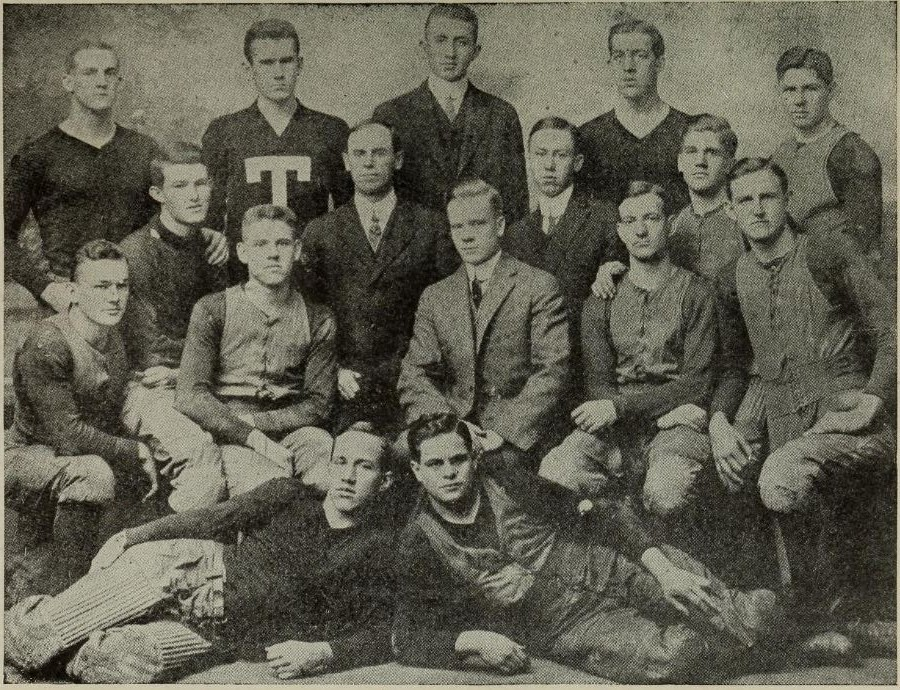
- Conference: Southern Intercollegiate Athletic Association
- Record: 5–3–1 (5–3 SIAA)
- Head coach: John Heisman (9th season)
- Offensive scheme: Jump shift
- Captain: Hugh Leuhrman
- Home stadium: The Flats

1912 Southern Intercollegiate Athletic Association football standings
	Conf.					Overall
Team	W		L		T	W		L		T
Vanderbilt $	3	–	0	–	1	8	–	1	–	1
Texas A&M	2	–	0	–	0	8	–	1	–	0
Kentucky State	1	–	0	–	0	7	–	2	–	0
Auburn	6	–	1	–	1	6	–	1	–	1
Georgia	5	–	1	–	1	6	–	1	–	1
Sewanee	2	–	1	–	2	5	–	1	–	2
Georgia Tech	5	–	3	–	0	5	–	3	–	1
Alabama	3	–	3	–	1	5	–	3	–	1
Tulane	3	–	3	–	0	5	–	3	–	0
Mississippi A&M	3	–	3	–	0	4	–	3	–	0
Clemson	3	–	3	–	0	4	–	4	–	0
Ole Miss	2	–	2	–	0	5	–	3	–	0
Mercer	2	–	3	–	1	5	–	3	–	1
LSU	2	–	3	–	0	4	–	3	–	0
Mississippi College	1	–	4	–	0	3	–	4	–	0
Tennessee	1	–	4	–	0	4	–	4	–	0
Florida	0	–	2	–	1	5	–	2	–	1
Central University	0	–	2	–	0	4	–	5	–	0
The Citadel	0	–	3	–	0	2	–	4	–	0
Howard (AL)	0	–	4	–	0	1	–	7	–	0
$ – Conference champion

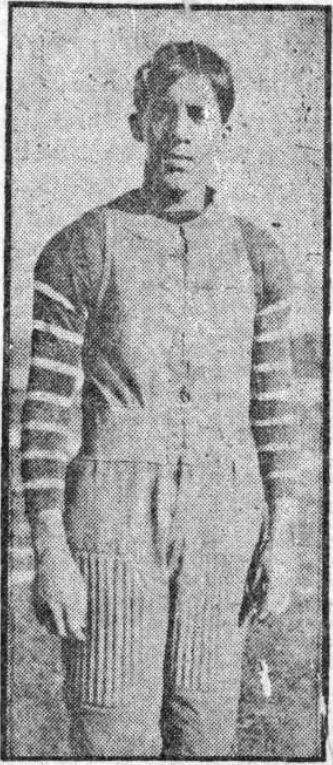
Team captain "Dutch" Luehrman

The 1912 Georgia Tech Yellow Jackets football team represented Georgia Tech as a member of the Southern Intercollegiate Athletic Association (SIAA) during the 1912 college football season. Led by ninth-year head coach John Heisman, the Yellow Jackets compiled an overall record of 5–3–1 with a mark of 5–3 in SIAA play. Georgia Tech played home games at The Flats, the future site of Bobby Dodd Stadium, in Atlanta. Alf McDonald was named to the College Football All-Southern Team as a quarterback.

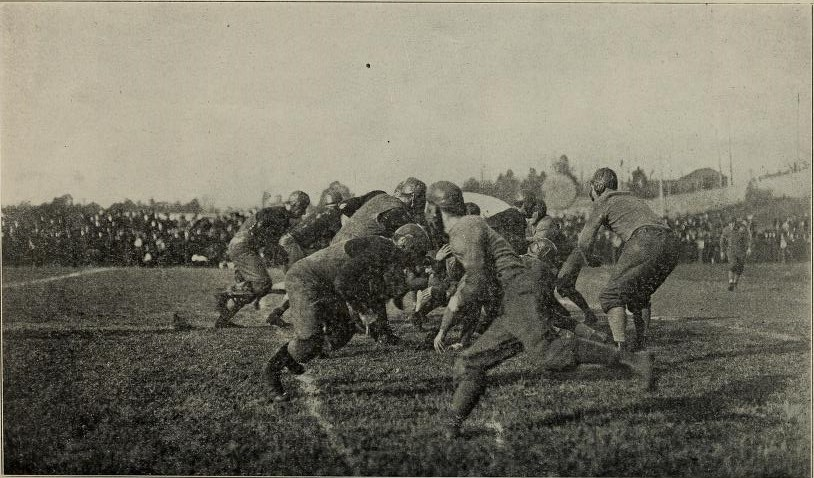
A scene from an unknown game

== Schedule ==
Date	Opponent	Site	Result	Source
September 28	11th Cavalry*	The Flats; Atlanta, GA	T 0–0	
October 5	at The Citadel	College Park Stadium; Charleston, SC	W 20–16	
October 12	Alabama	The Flats; Atlanta, GA (rivalry)	W 20–3	
October 19	at Mercer	Central City Park; Macon, GA	W 16–0	
October 26	vs. Florida	Jacksonville, FL	W 14–7	
November 2	Auburn	The Flats; Atlanta, GA (rivalry)	L 7–27	
November 9	Sewanee	The Flats; Atlanta, GA	L 0–7	
November 16	Georgia	The Flats; Atlanta, GA (rivalry)	L 0–20	
November 28	Clemson	The Flats; Atlanta, GA (rivalry)	W 23–0	
*Non-conference game
