= 1912 Central University football team =

American college football season

1912 Central University football
- Conference: Southern Intercollegiate Athletic Association
- Record: 4–5 (0–2 SIAA)
- Head coach: Patrick O'Brien (1st season)
- Home stadium: Cheek Field

1912 Southern Intercollegiate Athletic Association football standings
	Conf.					Overall
Team	W		L		T	W		L		T
Vanderbilt $	3	–	0	–	1	8	–	1	–	1
Texas A&M	2	–	0	–	0	8	–	1	–	0
Kentucky State	1	–	0	–	0	7	–	2	–	0
Auburn	6	–	1	–	1	6	–	1	–	1
Georgia	5	–	1	–	1	6	–	1	–	1
Sewanee	2	–	1	–	2	5	–	1	–	2
Georgia Tech	5	–	3	–	0	5	–	3	–	1
Alabama	3	–	3	–	1	5	–	3	–	1
Tulane	3	–	3	–	0	5	–	3	–	0
Mississippi A&M	3	–	3	–	0	4	–	3	–	0
Clemson	3	–	3	–	0	4	–	4	–	0
Ole Miss	2	–	2	–	0	5	–	3	–	0
Mercer	2	–	3	–	1	5	–	3	–	1
LSU	2	–	3	–	0	4	–	3	–	0
Mississippi College	1	–	4	–	0	3	–	4	–	0
Tennessee	1	–	4	–	0	4	–	4	–	0
Florida	0	–	2	–	1	5	–	2	–	1
Central University	0	–	2	–	0	4	–	5	–	0
The Citadel	0	–	3	–	0	2	–	4	–	0
Howard (AL)	0	–	4	–	0	1	–	7	–	0
$ – Conference champion

The 1912 Central University football team represented Central University of Kentucky (now known as Centre College) as a member the Southern Intercollegiate Athletic Association (SIAA) during the 1912 college football season. Led by first-year head coach Patrick O'Brien, the team compiled an overall record of 4–5, with a mark of 0–2 in conference play.

== Schedule ==
Date	Opponent	Site	Result	Source
October 5	Kentucky Military Institute*	Cheek Field; Danville, KY	W 12–0	
October 12	Morris Harvey*	Cheek Field; Danville, KY	L 6–57	
October 17	at Louisville*	High School Park; Louisville, KY	L 6–23	
October 26	Chattanooga*	Cheek Field; Danville, KY	W 7–6	
November 2	at Tennessee	Waite Field; Knoxville, TN	L 0–67	
October 9	Kentucky School for the Deaf*	Cheek Field; Danville, KY	W 13–7	
November 16	at Vanderbilt	Dudley Field; Nashville, TN	L 0–23	
November 21	at Georgetown (KY)*	Hinton Field; Georgetown, KY	L 12–34	
November 28	at Transylvania*	Thomas Field; Lexington, KY	W 13–7	
*Non-conference game
