= Alf McDonald (American football) =

American football player

Profile
- Position: Quarterback/Halfback/Punter

Career information
- College: Georgia Tech (1912–1913)

Awards and highlights
- All-Southern (1912)

Alf McDonald was a college football player.

== Georgia Tech ==
He was a prominent quarterback and punter for John Heisman's Georgia Tech Golden Tornado football team of the Georgia Institute of Technology.

=== 1912 ===
McDonald was selected All-Southern by Harold Ketron in 1912.

=== 1913 ===
McDonald was elected captain for 1914, but did not attend that year.

== See also ==
- List of Georgia Tech Yellow Jackets starting quarterbacks
