= Tom Brown (tackle) =

American football and basketball player (1890–1972)

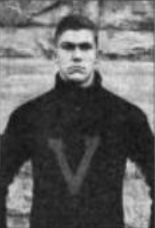

Profile
- Position: Tackle

Personal information
- Born: July 2, 1890; Gallatin, Tennessee, U.S.
- Died: August 3, 1972 (aged 82); Sylvania, Ohio, U.S.
- Listed height: 6 ft 2 in (1.88 m)
- Listed weight: 180 lb (82 kg)

Career history
- 1910–13: Vanderbilt (football & basketball)
- 1915–17: Toledo Maroons

Awards and highlights
- 3x SIAA champion (1910, 1911, 1912); 2x All-Southern (1912, 1913); Toledo Chapter, Football Hall of Fame; 1912 All-time Vandy 1st team

Thomas Hartwell Brown Jr. (July 2, 1890 – August 3, 1972) was an American college football and basketball player for the Vanderbilt Commodores. He played next to his brother Charles on the line for the football team. Brown was also a medical doctor.

== Early life ==
Tom Brown was born on July 2, 1890, in Gallatin, Tennessee, to Thomas Hartwell Brown, Sr. and Annie Donelson Hunt.

== Vanderbilt ==
Brown graduated from Vanderbilt University with an M. D in 1913. In his senior year he was awarded the title of 'Bachelor of Ugliness,' given to the most liked fellow on campus. Tom Brown was a prominent tackle on Dan McGugin's Commodores football teams, selected All-Southern. As a freshman, he took part in the scoreless tie of defending national champion Yale. In 1915, John Heisman selected Brown one of the 30 greatest Southern football players.

== Toledo ==
=== Pro football ===
In World War I he served in the Army Medical Corps as a lieutenant. While interning at St Vincent's Hospital in Toledo, he played with the Toledo Maroons. While with them, according to author Emil Klosinski, he played a part in the worst loss ever suffered by legendary coach Knute Rockne, a 40 to 0 win in 1917 over the "South Bend Jolly Fellows Club."

=== Physician ===
Brown was an avid member of the Rotary Club for more than 38 years. "He had no peers in his orthopedic ability and contributed greatly to Toledo medicine." He was a Fellow in the American College of Surgeons and President of the Lucas County Academy of Medicine.
