= Rickwood Field =

Baseball field in Birmingham, Alabama, United States

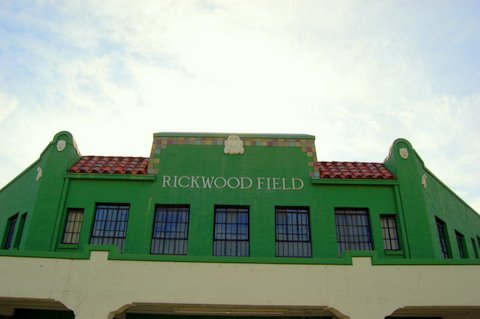
- Interactive map of Rickwood Field
- Location: 1137 2nd Avenue West, Birmingham, Alabama
- Owner: City of Birmingham
- Capacity: 8,300 (10,800 before renovations)
- Surface: Tahoma 31 Bermuda Grass
- Field size: Left field: 325 feet (99 m) Left center: 399 feet (122 m); Center field: 400 feet (120 m); Right center: 370 feet (110 m); Right field: 332 feet (101 m)
- Rickwood Field
- U.S. National Register of Historic Places
- Alabama Register of Landmarks and Heritage
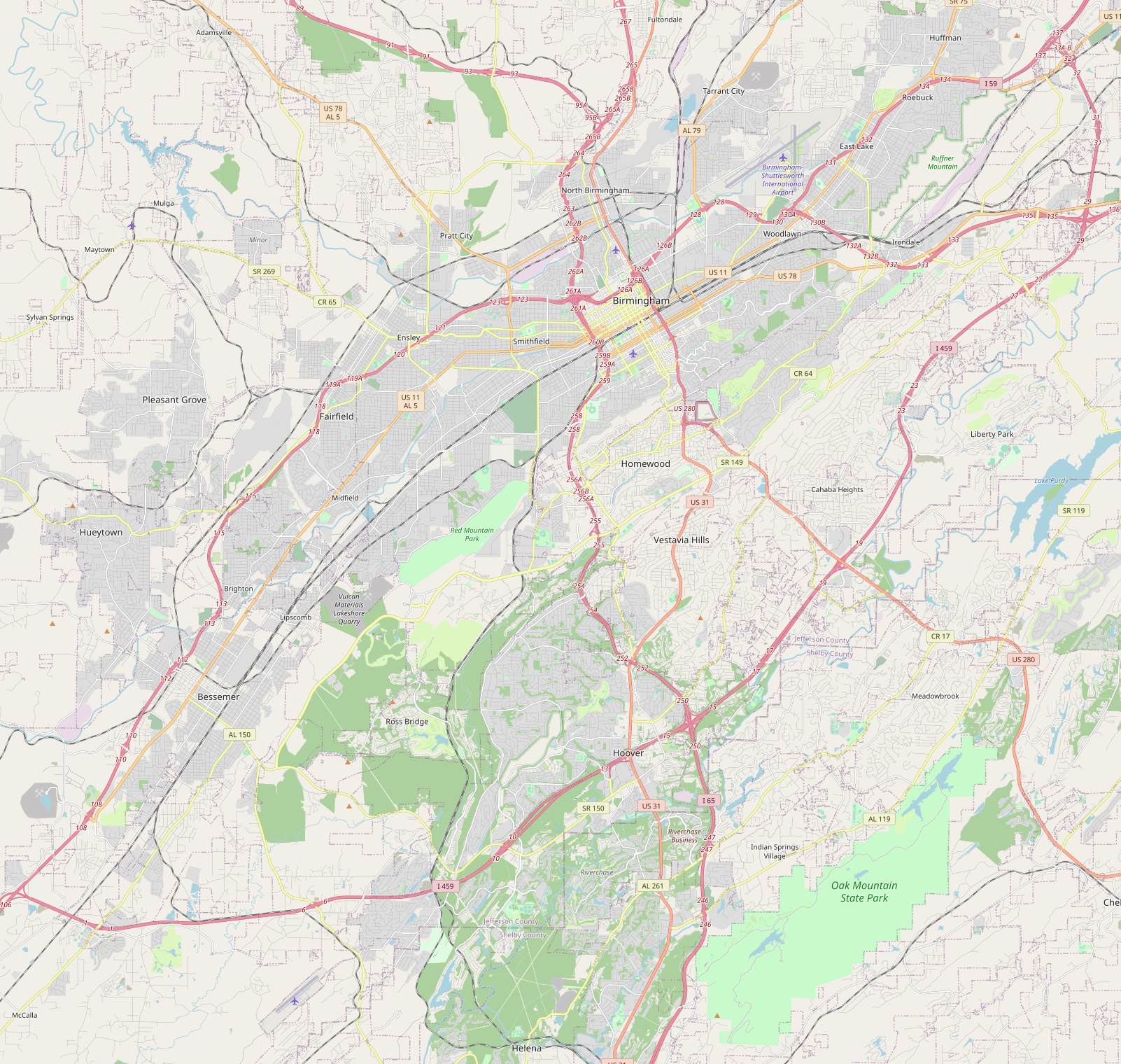
- Location within Birmingham, Alabama Location within Alabama Location within the United States
- Coordinates: 33°30′8″N 86°51′21″W
- Area: 12.7 acres (5.1 ha)
- Built: 1910
- NRHP reference No.: 92001826

Significant dates
- Added to NRHP: February 1, 1993
- Designated ARLH: December 19, 1991

Construction
- Groundbreaking: Spring 1910
- Opened: August 18, 1910
- Renovated: 2023–2024
- Cost: US$75,000 (US$2.59 million in 2025 dollars)

Tenants
- Birmingham Barons (Southern Association) – 1910–1961; Birmingham Barons (Southern League) – 1964–1965, 1981–1987, part-time 1988–present Birmingham A's (Southern League) – 1967–1975; Birmingham Black Barons (Negro Southern League) – 1920–1924, 1926, 1931–1936, 1938–1939; Birmingham Black Barons (Negro National League) – 1925–1926, 1927–1930, 1937, 1940–1948; Birmingham Black Barons (Negro American League) – 1949–1960; Philadelphia Phillies (NL) (Spring Training) – 1911, 1920; Pittsburgh Pirates (NL) (Spring Training) – 1919; Miles College (SIAC) 2025–

Rickwood Field is a ballpark located in Birmingham, Alabama, United States. It is the oldest existing professional baseball stadium in the country, as it was built for the Birmingham Barons in 1910 by industrialist and team-owner Rick Woodward. It has served as the home park for the Birmingham Barons and the Birmingham Black Barons of the Negro leagues.

Though the Barons moved their home games to Hoover Metropolitan Stadium after the 1988 season, Rickwood Field has been preserved and is undergoing gradual restoration as a "working museum" where baseball's history can be experienced. The Barons also play one regular season game a year at Rickwood Field.

Rickwood Field is listed on the National Register of Historic Places. The Birmingham chapter of the Society for American Baseball Research is named after the historic ballpark.

== Construction and opening ==
The Birmingham Coal Barons baseball team began playing professionally in 1887, with their home games at an informal park called "Slag Pile Field" in West End. In 1901 they joined the Southern Association.

Allen Harvey "Rick" Woodward, chairman of Woodward Iron Company and grandson of pioneer Birmingham industrialist Stimpson Harvey Woodward, purchased a majority share of the Birmingham Coal Barons baseball team from J. William McQueen in 1909 while he was still in his 20s. Immediately he began planning a grand showplace for his new team. He contacted Connie Mack for advice on the details, including the field dimensions. He settled on Shibe Park in Philadelphia (which was controlled by Mack's team and later renamed Connie Mack Stadium) and Forbes Field in Pittsburgh as the models for the new park. He purchased land in the West End neighborhood of Birmingham from the Alabama Central Railroad.

The $75,000 ($2.59 million in 2025) structure was designed by Southeastern Engineering Company of Birmingham (a short-lived subsidiary of Pittsburgh's General Fireproofing Company) and completed during the summer of 1910. The 12.7 acre (51,000 m^{2}) park was flanked along the basepaths by concrete and steel stands. A tile-roofed cupola on the roof behind home plate provided space for the announcer and the press. Woodward named the field after himself, using his nickname and the first part of his last name. It was the first concrete-and-steel stadium in Minor League Baseball.

Woodward invited Alabama Governor Braxton Bragg Comer, Birmingham Mayor Culpepper Exum, civic leader, George B. Ward and Victor H. Hanson, publisher of The Birmingham News, for opening day on August 18, 1910. The day was celebrated by businesses closing all over town to allow fans to fill the park for the first pitch at 3:30 P.M. Over 10,000 people attended that first game in which the Barons defeated the visiting Montgomery Climbers, 3–2.

The new ballpark attracted the Philadelphia Phillies to Birmingham for spring training in 1911. The Philadelphia Inquirer reported, "The players were agreeably surprised to find Rickwood field, for such it is named, one of the most complete and commodious minor league parks in the country. It lacks nothing either for the convenience of the player or the comfort of the spectator." After a week of intrasquad games, the Phillies opened against the Barons on Saturday, March 11, 1911.

In 1912, a spring tornado tore through the field, pulling up the outfield fence. Two years later, Woodward felt the need to have electric fans installed in the grandstands for the comfort of the crowd. The Pittsburgh Pirates also made Rickwood Field their spring training home in 1919.

== 1910s–1940s ==
The Alabama Crimson Tide played many home games at Rickwood Field between 1912 and 1927. The Tide had played home games on The Quad from 1893 to 1914, and built University Field in 1915. Rickwood's larger capacity enabled the Tide to sell more tickets and play before bigger crowds until Denny Stadium opened in 1929.

In 1921, the outfield fence was damaged in a tornado and quickly rebuilt. During 1924 to 1927, the infield bleachers were covered with a steel-framed roof designed by Denham, VanKeuren & Denham, Architects of Birmingham. Shortly after, in 1928, a new Mission style entry structure with offices was built to the designs of Paul Wright & Co., Engineers of Birmingham. A new concrete outfield wall replaced the original fence.

In 1931, in the first game of the Dixie Series championship, Birmingham's 43-year-old Ray Caldwell outpitched 22-year-old Dizzy Dean, who had guaranteed a win. The Barons won the series, 4 games to 3. In 1936, four monumental steel-frame light towers designed and fabricated by the Truscon Steel Company of Youngstown, Ohio, were erected, allowing for night games.

In 1938, Woodward sold the park to Ed Norton, a local businessman. In 1940, Norton sold it to the Cincinnati Reds. At that time, new outfield fences were built inside the original walls to reduce the field dimensions. G. J. Jebeles of Birmingham purchased the park in 1944. A ladies' rest room was added and the outfield fence reduced again in 1948. In 1949, ownership changed hands again, going to a partnership of Al DeMent, Al Belcher, and Rufus Lackey. They added a small restaurant in the entrance building in 1950 and installed additional box seats, necessitating the relocations of the dugouts farther down the baselines. In 1958, Belcher gained a majority share and control of the park.

== 1950s–1987 ==
In 1964, General Manager Glynn West purchased 1000 wooden seats from New York City's Polo Grounds and installed them at the park.

Major-league teams played preseason exhibition games at Rickwood as recently as the 1970s. The Phillies and Pirates played in front of 4,311 fans on April 10, 1965, and 6,109 fans the following day, April 11, 1965 who saw Roberto Clemente play right field for the Pirates, and get three hits in a 5-1 victory.

Belcher sold Rickwood Field in 1966 to the City of Birmingham, but retained a lease for the remainder of that year.

In 1966, the lease was transferred to Charlie Finley, who brought the Kansas City Athletics Double-A farm team to Birmingham for the 1967 season. Many of the players on that team later became the backbone of the championship major-league A's, including Reggie Jackson, Dave Duncan, and many of their pitchers. Among other things, that year is remembered for the day that 14,000 disappointed fans were sent home early when the Atlanta Braves vs. Southern League All-Stars exhibition game was called "on account of tornado." During this period, following a trend which swept minor league baseball (and which has since been largely reversed), the team took the name of the parent major-league club and was known as the "Birmingham A's".

The Atlanta Braves and Baltimore Orioles played a preseason exhibition game at Rickwood on April 2, 1974. On the verge of breaking Babe Ruth's all time homerun record, the Braves' Hank Aaron was honored on the field prior to the game, receiving proclamations from Birmingham mayor George Seibels and governor George Wallace.

Between 1979 and 1980, the wooden seats were replaced with plastic seats in the box areas and metal bleachers under the grandstands.

In 1981, Art Clarkson brought minor league baseball back to Rickwood with the Detroit Tigers Double-A club, which resumed the Barons name. He had a new electronic scoreboard installed at the park. In 1986, the Barons became the Chicago White Sox Double-A club, an affiliation that continues today.

In 1987, the Barons moved to a new facility, Hoover Metropolitan Stadium, in the suburb of Hoover. They returned to Birmingham in 2013 with the opening of Regions Field, just south of downtown Birmingham.

== 1990s–2023 ==
Since 1992, the ballpark has been under the care of the Friends of Rickwood who are restoring the facility to its former glory. They also host frequent amateur, police and semi-pro games and open the gates to visitors who can walk in and explore the grandstands or run the bases.

Since 1996, Rickwood Field has hosted the Barons for a throwback game in which both teams wear period uniforms. Each game honors a different era in Birmingham baseball history. Ballpark enthusiasts from across North America migrate to Rickwood to attend this Double-A regulation game, named the "Rickwood Classic", every season.

The ballpark was used by several film productions which contributed to the recreation of the scoreboard and press box and the addition of 1940s period-style advertisements on the outfield fence. Some of these retro-style ads have been sponsored by real Birmingham businesses, including a section sponsored by the descendants of Rick Woodward that advertises long-gone Woodward Iron Co. The outfield signs were designed by Ted Haigh, a Los Angeles–based graphic designer and executed by Skidmore Sign Company of Birmingham.

As of 2005, the Friends of Rickwood have spent around $2 million refurbishing the grandstands, press-box, locker rooms, roof and main entrance to the park. Future plans include establishing a Museum of Southern Baseball.

Since 2011, Play at the Plate Baseball has held an annual three-day adult baseball tournament with four teams from various regions of the country participating. The event is usually held in June.

ESPN Classic broadcast a re-enactment of a Negro league baseball game played at Rickwood on February 26, 2006. It featured teams wearing the uniforms of the fictitious "Bristol Barnstormers" (named for ESPN's hometown of Bristol, Connecticut) and the Birmingham Black Barons.

In 2022 and 2023, Rickwood Field hosted Savannah Bananas "bananaball" games.

== 2023 renovations and 2024 MLB game ==
On June 20, 2023, Major League Baseball announced that a regular season game between the St. Louis Cardinals and San Francisco Giants would be played at Rickwood Field on June 20, 2024, as part of a salute to the Negro leagues in observance of Juneteenth. The facility was scheduled to undergo further renovations in preparation for the game. Beginning October 2023, these renovations included "upgrading the grass playing surface to modern big league standards, padding and moving the outfield walls, overhauling the dugouts, adding new lights" as well as other items. The Cardinals won the game, 6–5. It was the first Major League game ever played in Alabama.

The ballpark underwent $5 million in renovations by 2024 which included a new playing surface, a new padded wall (which will be removed from the wall after the game) that is 10 feet (3.0 m) deeper than the original, and shifting the entire field to the left by 5 feet (1.5 m) to make the field more symmetrical. Other renovations include new dugouts, a modern batter's eye in center field, a digital scoreboard, netting along the foul lines, and accessibility upgrades.

In addition to the June 20, 2024, game between the Giants and Cardinals, Minor League Baseball's Montgomery Biscuits (Rays affiliate) and Birmingham Barons (White Sox affiliate) of Double-A played a game at Rickwood Field on June 18, 2024. The visiting Biscuits wore Montgomery Gray Sox road uniforms while the home Barons wore Birmingham Black Barons home uniforms. Amid the game, the public address announcer notified the crowd of the passing of Willie Mays, who grew up near Rickwood Field and started his pro baseball career with the Black Barons in 1948.

== Local use ==
Miles College's Division II Southern Intercollegiate Athletic Conference baseball team will play home games at Rickwood beginning with the 2025 season.

Birmingham City high schools play home games there as well.

== Popular culture ==
The ballpark was used for scenes in the film biopics of Jackie Robinson (42) and Ty Cobb (Cobb). The 1995 movie Soul of the Game features the park. The field is mentioned in the Willie Mays documentary, Say Hey, Willie Mays!, while detailing Mays' earlier professional career with the Birmingham Black Barons.

== Gallery ==
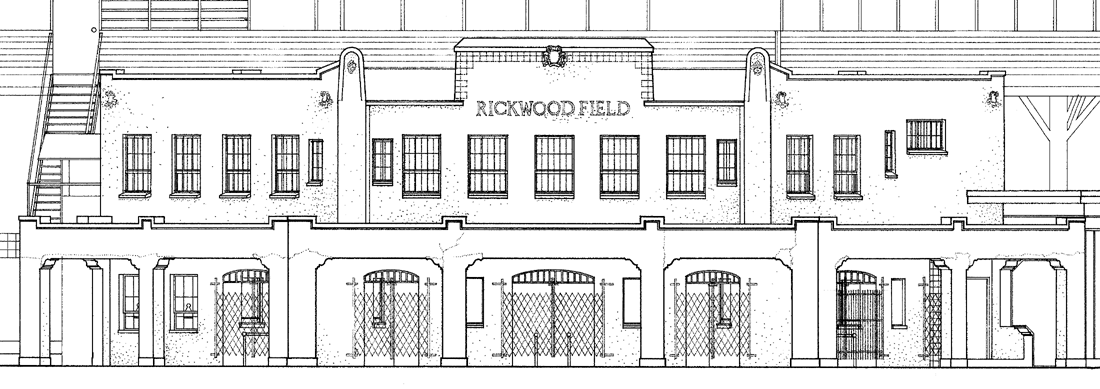
Rickwood Field facade

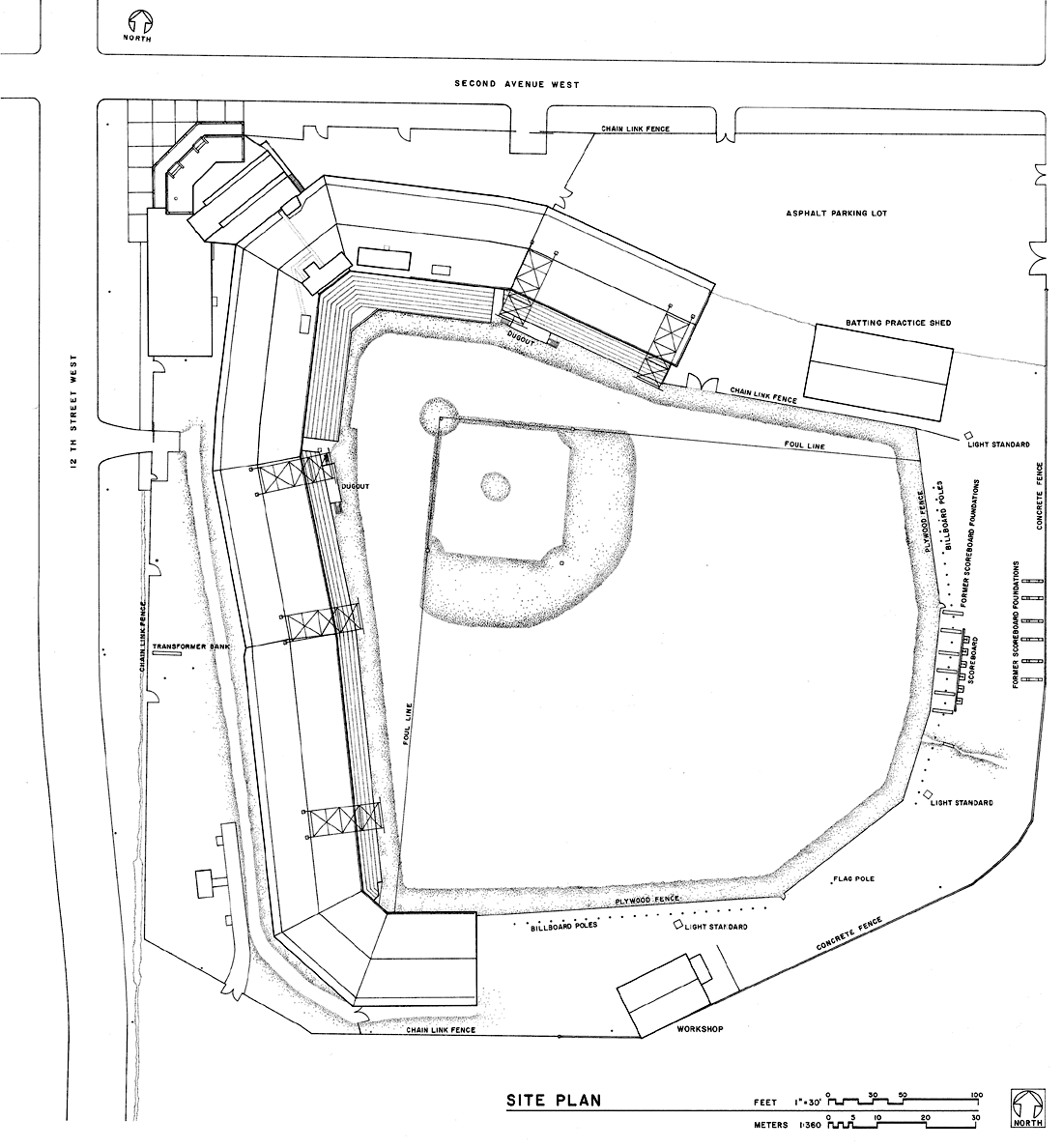
Plan of the field

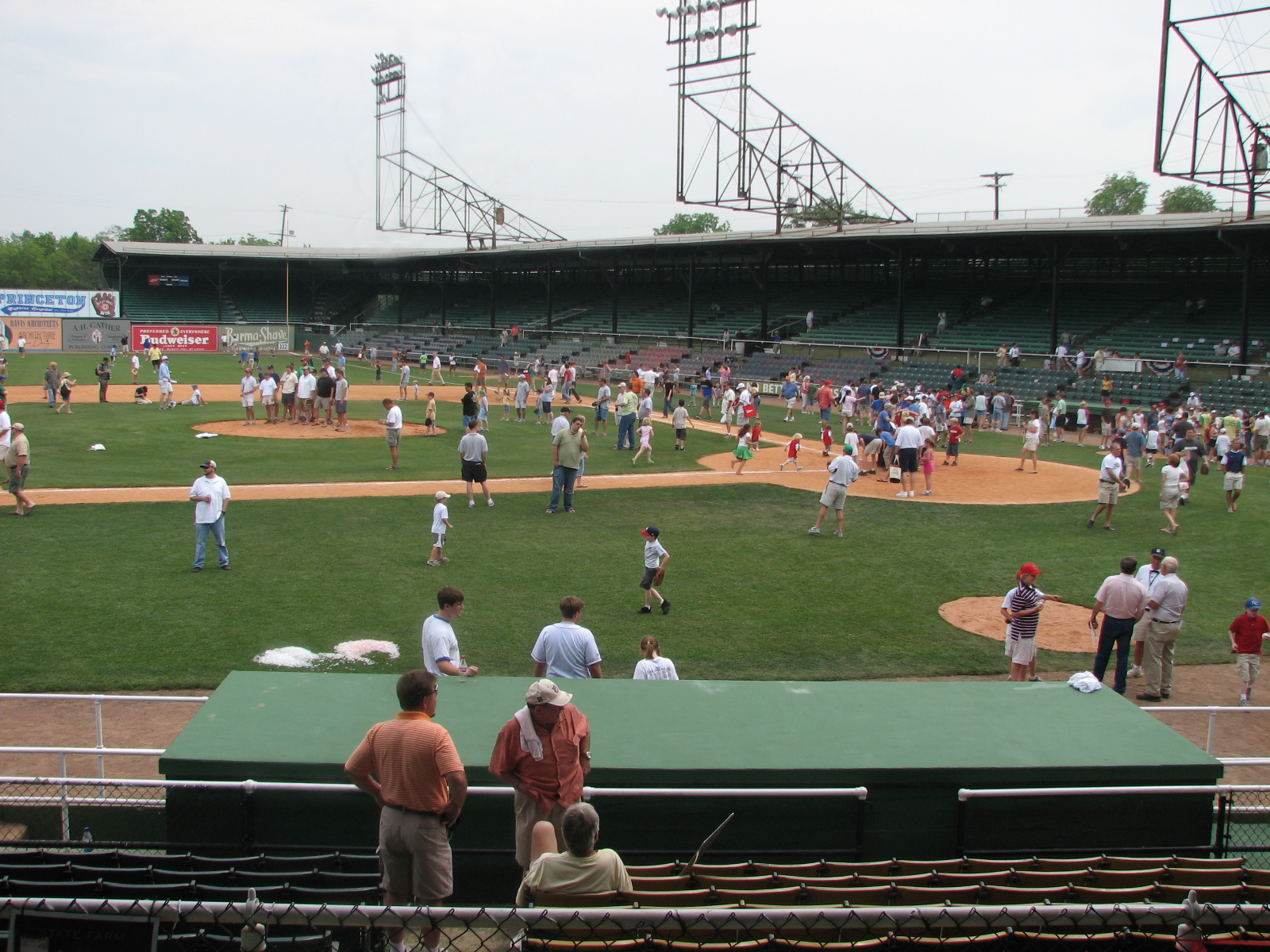
Field

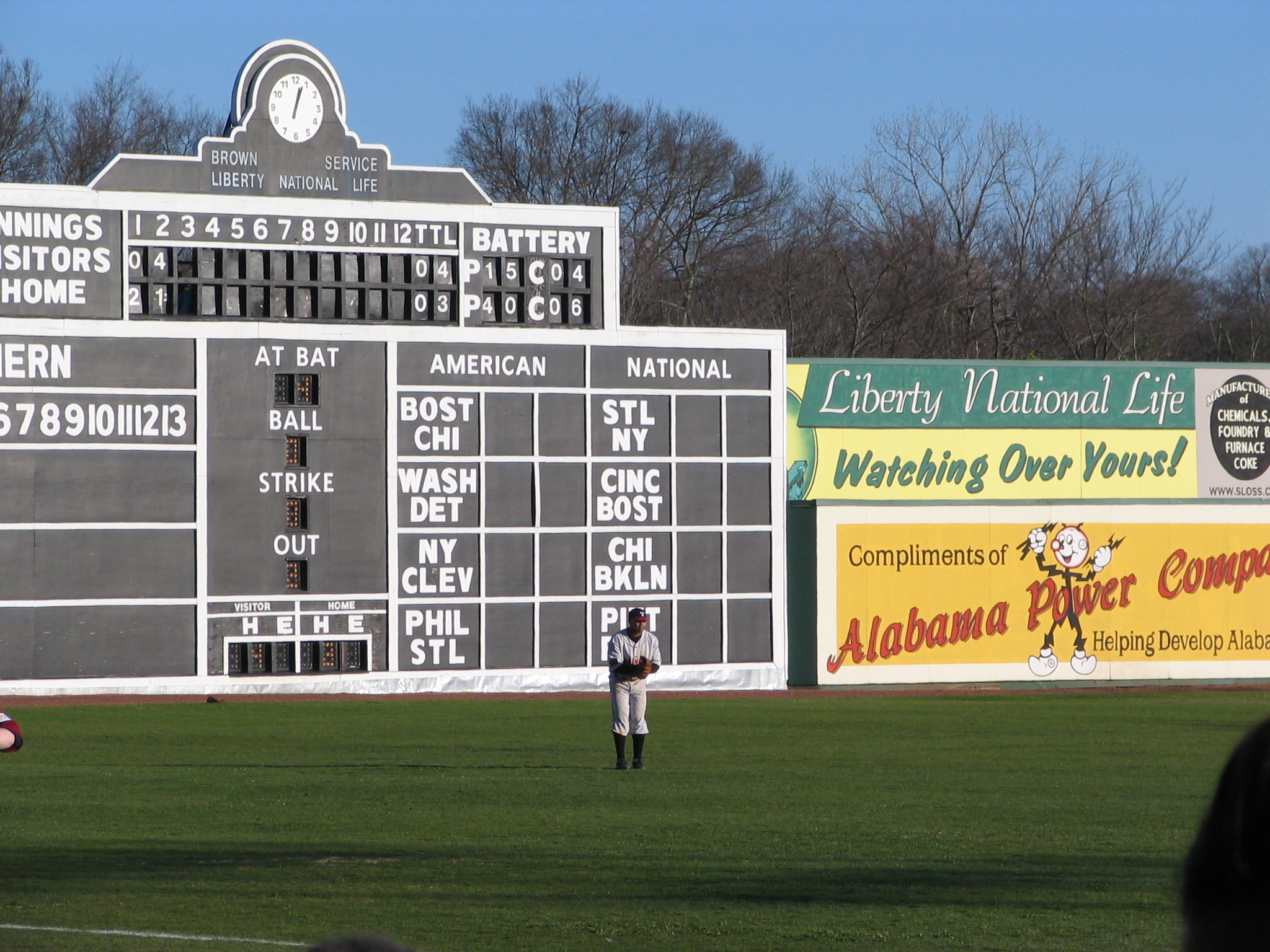
Scoreboard

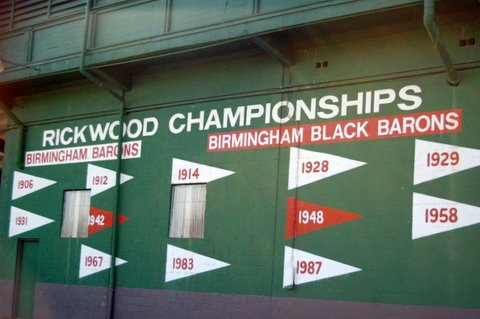
Rickwood Championships

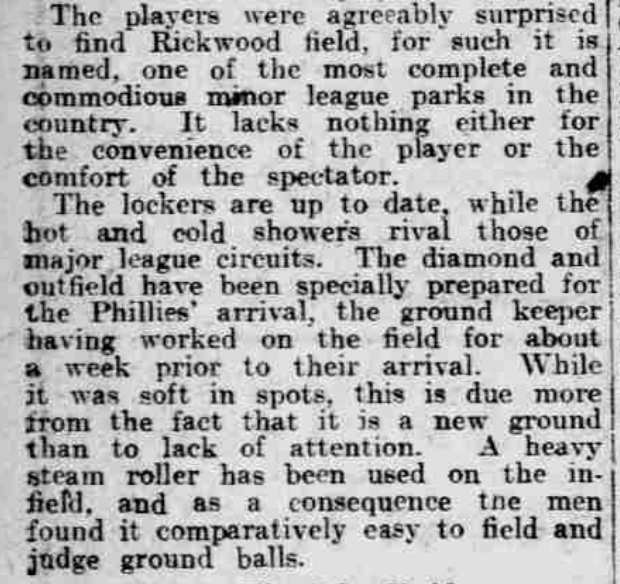
First impressions of Rickwood, March 1911

== See also ==
- Labatt Park in London, Ontario, recognized as the "oldest continually operating baseball grounds in the world".
- Warren Ballpark in Bisbee, Arizona, the grounds hosted professional baseball in 1909, but the present stadium dates to the 1930s.
- League Park in Cleveland, Ohio, began professionally on May 1, 1891, with Cy Young and the Cleveland Spiders defeating the Cincinnati Reds. The stands are removed, but the bases remain similarly positioned to this day. Local leagues continue to use this park.
