= 1912 Michigan Wolverines football team =

American college football season

1912 Michigan Wolverines football
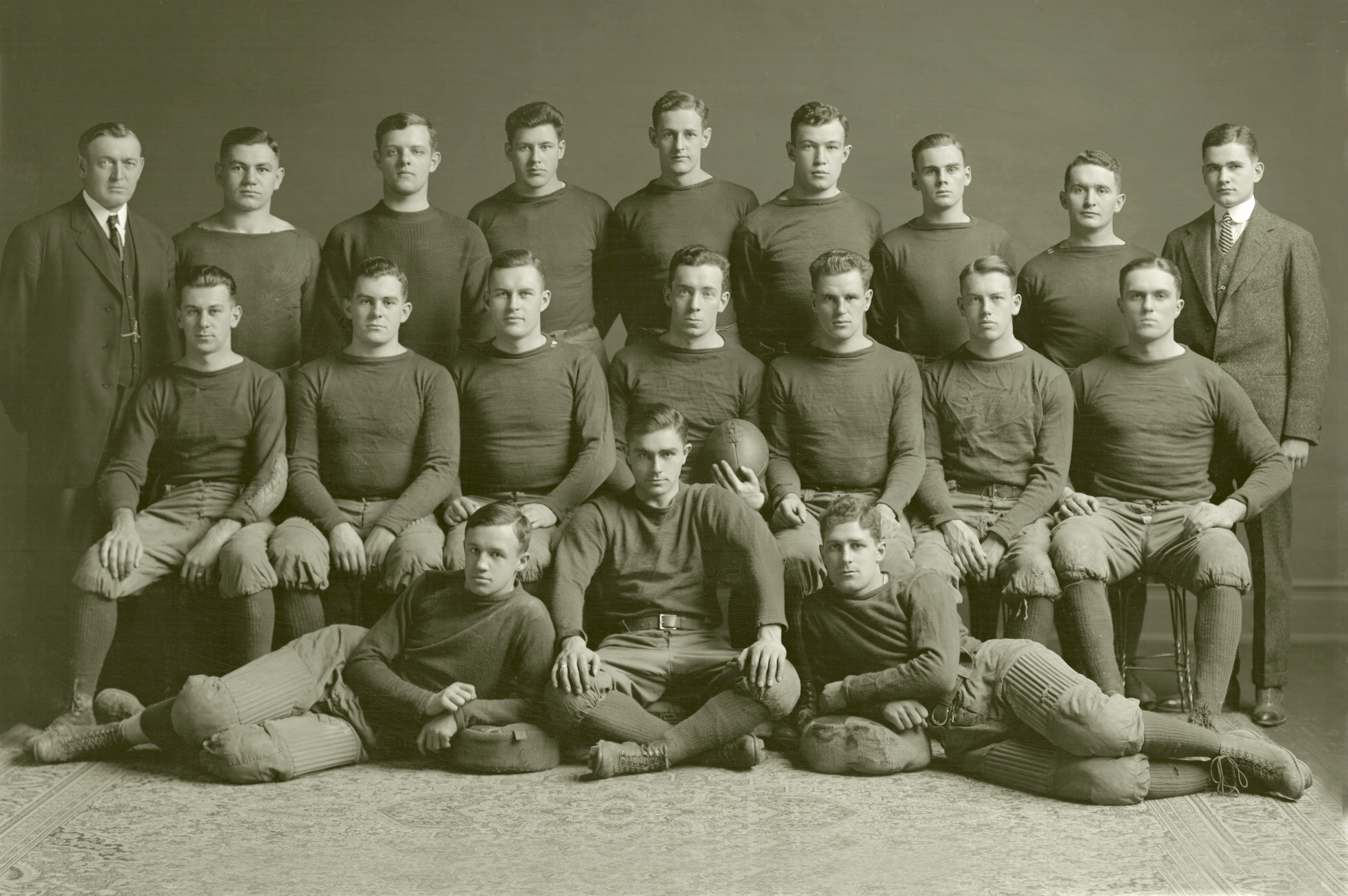
- Conference: Independent
- Record: 5–2
- Head coach: Fielding H. Yost (12th season)
- Captain: George C. Thomson
- Home stadium: Ferry Field

Uniform
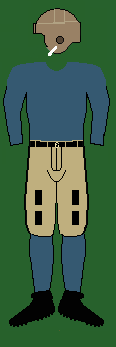

1912 Midwestern college football independents records
	Conf.			Overall
Team	W	L	T	W		L		T
Notre Dame		–		7	–	0	–	0
Lincoln (MO)		–		1	–	0	–	0
Lake Forest		–		5	–	0	–	1
Michigan Agricultural		–		7	–	1	–	0
North Dakota Agricultural		–		5	–	1	–	0
South Dakota		–		5	–	1	–	0
Mount Union		–		9	–	2	–	0
Saint Louis		–		7	–	1	–	2
Michigan		–		5	–	2	–	0
Wabash		–		5	–	2	–	0
Buchtel		–		5	–	2	–	1
Detroit		–		5	–	2	–	1
Iowa State Teachers		–		5	–	2	–	1
St. Mary's (OH)		–		4	–	2	–	0
Michigan State Normal		–		4	–	2	–	1
Butler		–		5	–	3	–	0
Doane		–		5	–	3	–	0
Haskell		–		7	–	4	–	0
Central Michigan		–		2	–	1	–	2
Western State Normal		–		3	–	2	–	0
St. Viator		–		4	–	4	–	0
Fairmount		–		4	–	5	–	0
Marquette		–		3	–	4	–	0
Northern Illinois State		–		3	–	5	–	0
Baldwin–Wallace		–		0	–	1	–	0
Heidelberg		–		0	–	6	–	0

The 1912 Michigan Wolverines football team represented the University of Michigan as an independent during the 1912 college football season. The team's head coach was Fielding H. Yost in his 12th year at Michigan. The Wolverines compiled a record of 5–2 and outscored opponents 158 to 65.

The team's captain and fullback George C. Thomson was also the leading scorer with 49 points on eight touchdowns and one extra point. Two Michigan players, Miller Pontius and Jimmy Craig, were consensus All-Western players. Pontius was also selected as a first-team All-American by Alfred Harvey.

== Schedule ==
Date	Opponent	Site	Result	Attendance
October 5	Case	Ferry Field; Ann Arbor, MI	W 34–0	6,000
October 12	Michigan Agricultural	Ferry Field; Ann Arbor, MI (rivalry)	W 55–7	
October 19	at Ohio State	Ohio Field; Columbus, OH (rivalry)	W 14–0	10,000
October 26	at Syracuse	Archbold Stadium; Syracuse, NY	L 7–18	
November 2	South Dakota	Ferry Field; Ann Arbor, MI	W 7–6	
November 9	at Penn	Franklin Field; Philadelphia, PA	L 21–27	15,000
November 16	Cornell^{†}	Ferry Field; Ann Arbor, MI	W 20–7	
^{†}Homecoming

== Season summary ==
=== Pre-season ===
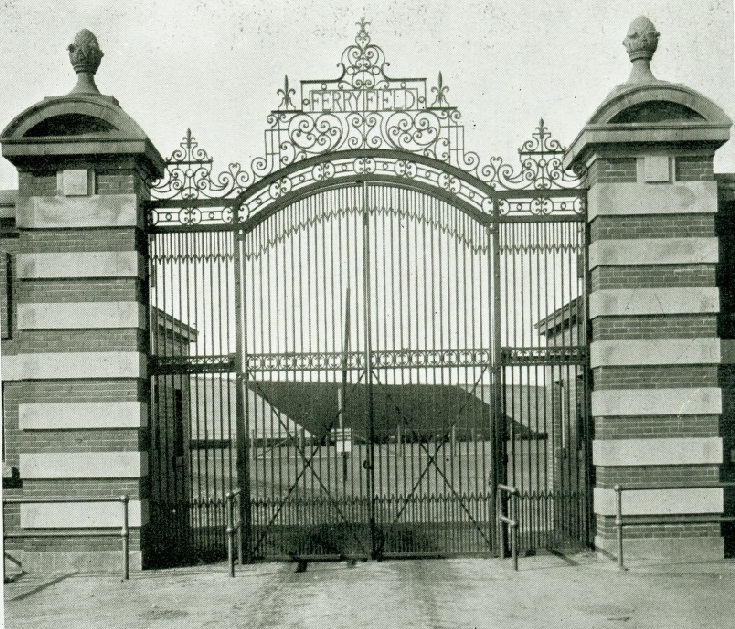
Ferry Field gate, c. 1912

In May 1912, the University of Michigan and the University of Pennsylvania jointly announced that they had signed an agreement to continue their annual football rivalry games through the 1915 season. Since leaving the Big Ten Conference, Michigan had played annual rivalry games against Penn at or near the end of the season. Penn was one of the dominant football programs of the era, winning seven national championships between 1894 and 1912.

In June 1912, the Detroit Free Press wrote that, with eight varsity letter winners returning from the 1911 team, Michigan's football prospects were the "brightest in years."

In early August 1912, invitations were sent to candidates for the football team for training camp at Ferry Field in mid-September. Instead of holding training camp at Whitmore Lake, Michigan, as had been the tradition for several years, the 1912 training camp was held on campus. On the eve of the opening of training camp, Michigan announced that former Michigan star, Henry Schulte, would join Fielding H. Yost's staff as an assistant coach. Stung by fumbles in past years, Coach Yost posted a sign on the door of the training house at Ferry Field that read, "No butterfingers need apply."

On September 23, 1912, the Detroit Free Press reported from training camp that one of the Michigan players had broken the program's marathon eating record. The player, who asked that his identity not be disclosed, reportedly required two waiters "to minister to his wants alone." At the team's lunch on September 22, the player consumed a bowl of cream of tomato soup, a dish of celery, "half a dozen or so bunches of grapes," a dish of crackers, more than ten slices of bread and butter, two helpings of chicken, "three thick slices of roast beef with brown gravy," four side dishes of potatoes, two side orders of string beans, three dishes of ice cream, two dishes of rice pudding, two glasses of milk, and a pitcher of water. The meal was consumed in "the fast time of 2:13." After the contest, Michigan's trainer Stephen Farrell aid, "More could not have been asked," to which the person in charge of feeding the team replied, "More would not have been given."

On the day before the season opener, Coach Yost declined to give the press his final starting lineup. He noted that George C. Paterson would start at center with George C. Thomson at fullback and Jimmy Craig at left halfback. However, questions remained as to whether Yost would start Herbert Huebel or Michael Boyle at quarterback and Miller Pontius or Roy Torbet at left end.

=== Case ===
Week 1: Case at Michigan

Team	1	2	3	4	Total
Case	0	0	0	0	0
• Michigan	14	7	0	13	34

- Date: October 5, 1912
- Location: Ferry Field
  Ann Arbor, MI
- Game start: 2:30 p.m.
- Game attendance: 6,000
- Referee: Ralph P. Hoagland (Princeton)

Michigan opened its 1912 season with a 34–0 victory over the team from Cleveland's Case Scientific School. The game was the 16th meeting between the two programs. Michigan had won 14 times and tied once.

The game was played in hot weather in front of a crowd totaling somewhat over 6,000 persons at Ferry Field in Ann Arbor. The Detroit Free Press wrote that the heat slowed both teams and "made anything except pop hard work." Halfback Jimmy Craig and fullback George C. Thomson were the principal ground gainers for Michigan. The Free Press praised Craig for his "wonderful 'crooked' running" and Thomson for his accurate forward passing, solid defense, and for "hitting the line like a wild engine." Michigan scored three touchdowns in the first half, two by Thomson and one by Herbert Huebel. Craig and Thomas Bushnell also scored touchdowns in the fourth quarter. George C. Paterson kicked four extra points.

The game was played in 15-minute quarters. Michigan's lineup against Case was Pontius, Peterson and Wyman (left end), Cole and Musser (left tackle), Clem Quinn (left guard), Paterson (center), Allmendinger (right guard), Raynsford and McHale (right tackle), Barton (right end), Huebel, Boyle and Bushnell (quarterback), Craig and Hughitt (left halfback), Carpell, Torbet, and Collette (right halfback), and Thomson and Cyril Quinn (fullback).

=== Michigan Agricultural ===
Week 2: Michigan Agricultural at Michigan

Team	1	2	3	4	Total
Michigan Agricultural	7	0	0	0	7
• Michigan	0	7	14	34	55

- Date: October 12, 1912
- Location: Ferry Field
  Ann Arbor, MI
- Referee: J. C. Holderness (Lehigh)

In the second week of the season, Michigan defeated Michigan Agricultural College by a 55–7 score at Ferry Field. It was the seventh game in the Michigan - Michigan State football rivalry, and Michigan had a 5–0–1 record in the six prior meetings, outscoring the Aggies by a combined total of 225 to 6.

The Aggies took a 7-0 lead in the first quarter on an 85-yard interception return by left end Blake Miller. The touchdown was the first ever scored by a Michigan Aggies team against Michigan. Michigan tied the score in the second quarter and added 48 points in the second half. Michigan scored eight touchdowns in the game, two each by Jimmy Craig and Tommy Hughitt and one each by George C. Thomson, Herbert Huebel, Charles Barton, and Thomas Bushnell. George C. Paterson kicked seven extra points for Michigan.

The game was played in 15-minute quarters. Michigan's lineup against the Aggies was Pontius, Peterson, Wyman and Bleich (left end), Raynsford and Cole (left tackle), Quinn and Musser (left guard), Paterson (center), Allmendinger (right guard), McHale (right tackle), Torbet and Barton (right end), Huebel and Bushnell (quarterback), Craig and Hughitt (left halfback), Carpell and Collette (right halfback), and Thomson and Cyril Quinn (fullback).

=== At Ohio State ===
Week 3: Michigan at Ohio State

Team	1	2	3	4	Total
• Michigan	7	0	0	7	14
Ohio State	0	0	0	0	0

- Date: October 19, 1912
- Location: Ohio Field
  Columbus, OH
- Game attendance: 9,000
- Referee: Horatio B. Hackett

In the third week of the season, Michigan defeated Ohio State by a 14–0 score at Columbus, Ohio. It was the 14th game in the Michigan - Ohio State football rivalry, and Michigan had an 11–0–2 record in the 13 prior meetings. On October 19, 1912, more than 500 Michigan supporters traveled on a special train to Columbus to attend the game.

Michigan's touchdowns were scored by Jimmy Craig and George C. Thomson. George C. Paterson kicked both extra points. The game was played in front of a crowd of 9,000 persons, the largest to watch a Michigan-Ohio State game up to that time. With Ohio State having been admitted into the Western Conference for the 1913 season, the 1912 Michigan-Ohio State game marked the close of athletic relations between the schools. Michigan and Ohio State did not resume their football rivalry until 1918, when Michigan returned to the conference.

After the Ohio State game, the Detroit Free Press wrote: "The material is undoubtedly on hand to make the team one of the greatest that has ever worn the Maize and Blue but the men are not playing together nor are they putting up the game that they seem to be capable. Individually the squad contains many stars and players of good calibre but collectively the team is mediocre."

The game was played in 15-minute quarters. Michigan's lineup against Ohio State (starters listed first) was Pontius (left end), Cole (left tackle), Quinn (left guard), Paterson and Musser (center), Allmendinger (right guard), McHale (right tackle), Barton and Torbet (right end), Huebel and Bushnell (quarterback), Craig and Collette (left halfback), Carpell and Hughitt (right halfback), and Thomson (fullback). Horatio Hackett was the referee, and Paul Hoagland was the umpire.

=== At Syracuse ===
Week 4: Michigan at Syracuse

Team	1	2	3	4	Total
Michigan	7	0	0	0	7
• Syracuse	0	6	6	6	18

- Date: October 26, 1912
- Location: Standard Oil Stadium
  Syracuse, NY
- Referee: Pendleton

In the fourth week of the season, Michigan lost to Syracuse by an 18–7 score at Standard Oil Stadium in Syracuse, New York. It was Michigan's fifth game against Syracuse, with Michigan having a 2–1–1 record in the four prior meetings.

The game was played in light rain and on a wet field. The day before the game, E. A. Batchelor described the condition of the field in the Detroit Free Press: "Judging by the condition of the Standard Oil stadium tomorrow's football game between Michigan and Syracuse is more likely to be a test of seamanship than of speed, strength and strategy. When it comes to collecting and retaining water, the local gridiron asks no odds of the Atlantic ocean. . . . Syracuse is rather tickled over the especially fine crop of mud now ripening in the stadium, but Yost doesn't like it a bit. . . . On a hard, dry gridiron Michigan undoubtedly would be a top-heavy favorite over the Orange. . . . In the approaching amphibious test, however, everybody seems to look for a bad football game in which the worst team may win."

Michigan took a 7–0 lead in the first quarter on a 70-yard scoring drive capped with a three-yard run by fullback George C. Thomson and an extra point by Herbert Huebel. Michigan was held scoreless in the remaining three quarters, and Syracuse scored a touchdown in each of those quarters. Michigan center Charles Barton was blamed for five bad long snaps to Thomson that "proved disastrous for the Ann Arborites." Syracuse halfback Castle scored two touchdowns. Syracuse's final touchdown followed a fumble by Huebel that was returned 45 yards by Castle.

Michigan's lineup against Syracuse was Torbet and Tessin (left end), Cole (left tackle), Quinn (left guard), Barton and Musser (center), Allmendinger (right guard), McHale (right tackle), Pontius and Carpell (right end), Huebel and Bushnell (quarterback), Craig (left halfback), Hughitt and Boyle (right halfback), and Thomson (fullback). Pendleton was the referee, and Hinkey was the umpire.

=== South Dakota ===
Week 5: South Dakota at Michigan

Team	1	2	3	4	Total
South Dakota	0	6	0	0	6
• Michigan	0	0	0	7	7

- Date: November 2, 1912
- Location: Ferry Field
  Ann Arbor, MI
- Game start: 2:30 p.m.
- Referee: Dave Fultz (Brown)

In the fifth week of the season, Michigan defeated the South Dakota Coyotes by a 7–6 score at Ferry Field. The game was the first and only meeting between the two football programs. The 1912 South Dakota football team was 5–0 in its other games and outscored those opponents 234 to 6, including a 10–0 shutout victory over Minnesota at Minneapolis and a 73–6 victory over South Dakota State. In the Detroit Free Press, E. A. Batchelor wrote that South Dakota was an "unknown quantity," and the game was "impossible to 'dope'."

South Dakota took a 6–0 lead with a touchdown in the second quarter. Michigan took the lead with less than a minute left in the game on a touchdown by George C. Thomson and an extra point kick by George C. Paterson.

Michigan's lineup against South Dakota was Torbet (left end), Cole and Musser (left tackle), Quinn (left guard), Paterson (center), Allmendinger (right guard), Pontius (right tackle), Carpell (right end), Huebel (quarterback), Craig (left halfback), Boyle and Hughitt (right halfback), and Thomson (fullback).

=== At Penn ===
Week 6: Michigan at Penn

Team	1	2	3	4	Total
Michigan	14	7	0	0	21
• Penn	0	7	7	13	27

- Date: November 9, 1912
- Location: Franklin Field • Philadelphia, PA
- Game start: 2:00 p.m.
- Referee: William S. Langford (Trinity)

On November 9, 1912, Michigan lost to the Penn Quakers, 27–21, at Franklin Field in Philadelphia. The 1912 game was the eighth meeting between the schools. Penn won the first four games, and Michigan went 2–0–1 from 1909 to 1911.

The game was played in cold weather and heavy winds. Michigan took a 21–0 lead in the game, but Penn staged a comeback culminating in a long touchdown run in the final minute of the game. Herbert Huebel ran for Michigan's first touchdown, and George C. Paterson kicked the extra point. Michigan scored again on the next drive, this time on a touchdown run by George C. Thomson. Paterson kicked the extra point, and Michigan led 14–0 at the end of the first quarter. In the second quarter, Thomson scored again, and Paterson kicked the extra point to give Michigan a 21–0 lead. Late in the second quarter, Penn scored to cut the lead to 21–7 at halftime.

Penn held Michigan scoreless in the second half while scoring three touchdowns. In the fourth quarter, Penn cut Michigan's lead to 21–20 but missed the extra point attempt that would have tied the game. In the final minute of play, Michigan was forced to punt. Penn's quarterback Marshall took the punt at midfield and returned it 55 yards to give Penn a 26–21 lead. The crowd at Franklin Field swarmed onto the field, and a lengthy delay ensued as the police drove thousands of Penn fans from the field. When play resumed, Penn kicked the extra point to extend its lead to 27–21. With less than a minute left in the game, Michigan threw three forward passes, all of which were incomplete.

Michigan's lineup against Penn was Torbet (left end), Cole (left tackle), Quinn (left guard), Paterson and Musser (center), Allmendinger (right guard), Pontius (right tackle), Carpell and Barton (right end), Huebel and Bushnell (quarterback), Craig (left halfback), Hughitt and Boyle (right halfback), and Thomson (fullback).

=== Cornell ===
Week 7: Cornell at Michigan

Team	1	2	3	4	Total
Cornell	0	7	0	0	7
• Michigan	7	0	0	13	20

- Date: November 16, 1912
- Location: Ferry Field
  Ann Arbor, MI
- Game start: 2:30 p.m.
- Referee: Horatio B. Hackett

In the final week of the season, Michigan defeated Cornell by a 20–7 score at Ferry Field. The game was the tenth meeting between Michigan and Cornell. Michigan had a record of 1–8 in the first nine games.

Michigan took a 7–0 lead in the first quarter on a forward pass from Roy Torbet to Miller Pontius. Cornell tied the game with a touchdown in the second quarter. The game remained tied going into the fourth quarter. Michigan took the lead on a touchdown pass from Herbert Huebel to Pontius. Michigan's final touchdown was scored by Huebel on a 55-yard punt return in the last minute of the game. George C. Thomson and George C. Paterson each kicked an extra point.

Michigan's lineup against Cornell was Torbet (left end), Cole (left tackle), Quinn (left guard), Paterson (center), Allmendinger and Raynsford (right guard), Musser (right tackle), Pontius (right end), Huebel (quarterback), Craig and Collette (left halfback), Hughitt (right halfback), and Thomson (fullback).

=== Post-season ===
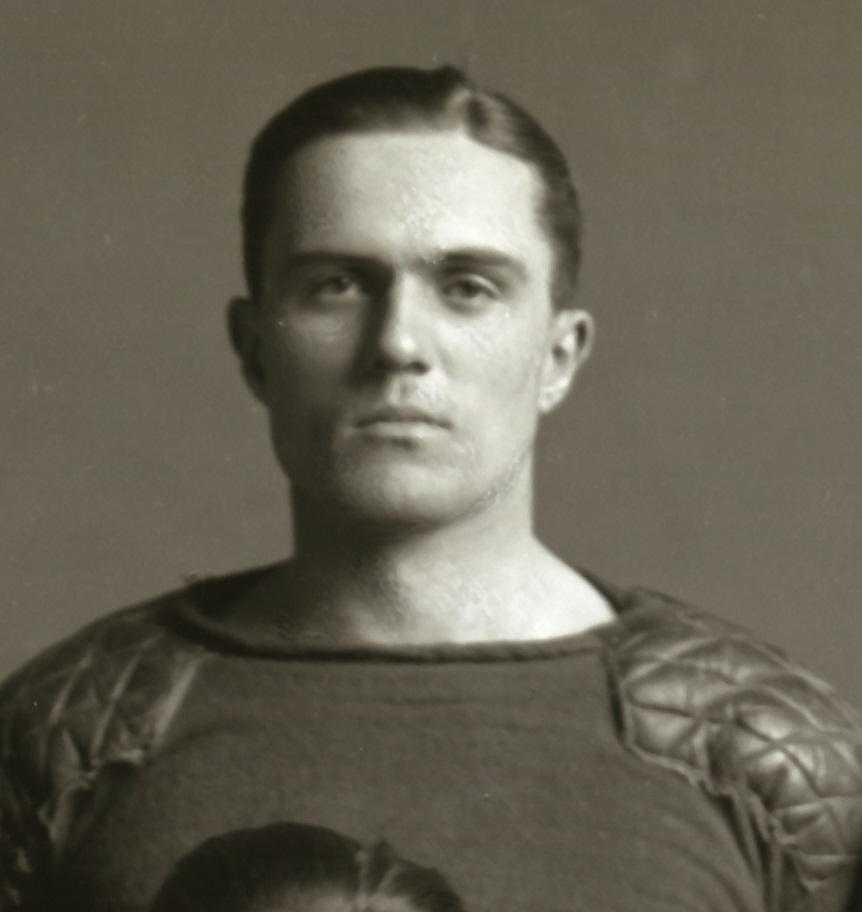
Miller Pontius

At the end of the 1912 season, Miller Pontius was the only Michigan player to receive first-team All-America honors. He was selected as a first-team All-American by Alfred Harvey.

Several Michigan players received first-team All-Westerns honors. Pontius and Jimmy Craig were consensus picks. The Michigan players chosen by the various All-Western selectors were:

- E. C. Patterson for Collier's Weekly: Pontius and Craig
- Walter Eckersall for the Chicago Daily Tribune: Pontius and Craig
- G. W. Axelson for the Chicago Record Herald: Pontius, Craig and George C. Paterson
- Matt Foley for the Chicago Inter Ocean: Pontius and Craig (first-team); Paterson (second-team)
- Fielding H. Yost in the Detroit Free Press: Pontius, Craig, Paterson, Roy Torbet, Clement Quinn, George C. Thomson

== Players ==
=== Varsity letter winners ===
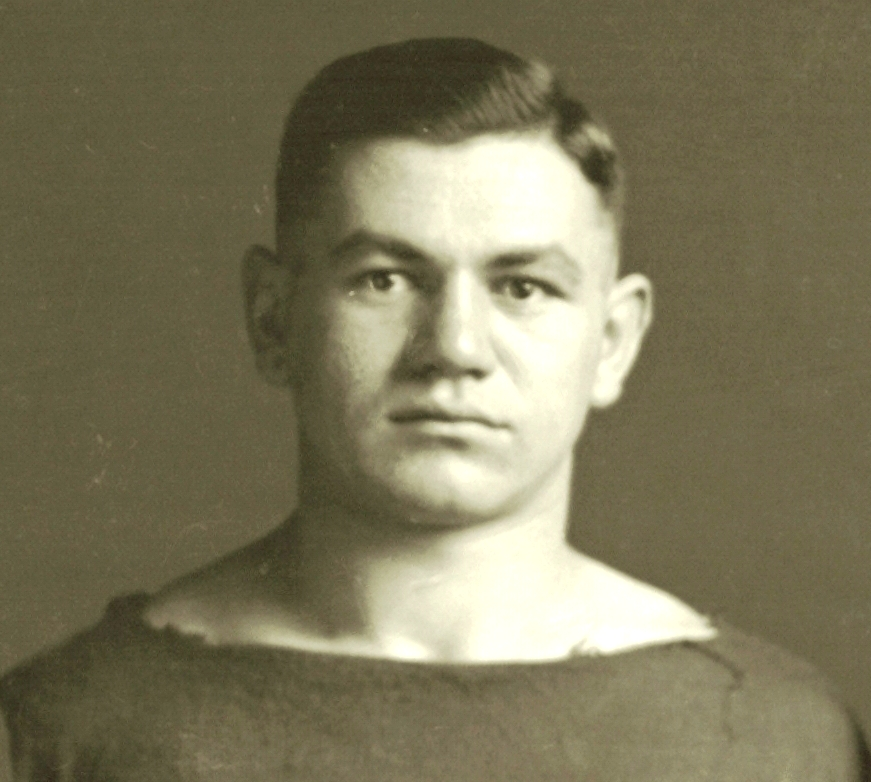
Ernest Allmendinger

The following players won varsity "M" letters for their participation on the 1912 football team:

- Ernest Allmendinger, Ann Arbor, MI - started all 7 games at right guard
- Charles P. Barton, Jr., New York, NY - started 3 games at right end (Case, Ohio State, Penn), 1 game at center (Syracuse); also appeared in the M.A.C. game as a substitute at right end
- Michael H. Boyle, Duluth, Minnesota - started one game at right halfback (South Dakota); also appeared as a substitute at quarterback against Case and at right halfback against Syracuse and Penn
- Thomas H. Bushnell, East Cleveland, Ohio - appeared as a substitute at quarterback against Case, M.A.C., Ohio State, Syracuse and Penn
- Otto Carpell, Saginaw, MI - started 3 games at right halfback (Case, M.A.C., Ohio State), 2 games at right end (South Dakota and Penn); also appeared as a substitute at right end against Syracuse
- Walter Munson Cole, Cedar Springs, MI - started 6 games at left tackle (also appeared in the M.A.C. game as a substitute at the same position)
- William H. Collette, Menominee, MI - appeared as a substitute at halfback against Case, M.A.C., Ohio State, and Cornell
- James B. Craig, Detroit, MI - started all 7 games at left halfback
- Herbert Huebel, Menominee, MI - started all 7 games at quarterback
- Ernest "Tommy" Hughitt, Escanaba, MI - started 3 games at right halfback (Syracuse, Penn and Cornell); also appeared as a substitute at halfback against Case, M.A.C., Ohio State, and South Dakota
- James C. Musser, Akron, Ohio - started 1 game at right tackle (Cornell); also appeared as a substitute at left tackle against Case and South Dakota, at left guard against M.A.C., and at center against Ohio State, Syracuse and Penn
- George C. Paterson, Detroit, MI - started 6 games at center (did not play against Syracuse)
- Miller Pontius, Circleville, Ohio - started 3 games at left end (Case, M.A.C., and Ohio State), 2 games at right end (Syracuse and Cornell), 2 games at right tackle (South Dakota and Penn)
- Clement Quinn, Saginaw, MI - started all 7 games at left guard
- James W. Raynsford, Detroit, MI - started 1 game at left tackle (M.A.C.), 1 game at right tackle (Case); also appeared as a substitute at right guard against Cornell
- George C. Thomson, Cadillac, MI - started all 7 games at fullback
- Roy Torbet, Detroit, MI - started 4 games at left end (Syracuse, South Dakota, Penn and Cornell), 1 game at right end (M.A.C.); also appeared as a substitute at right halfback against Case and at right end against Ohio State

=== Reserves ===
- Walter H. Allmendinger, Ann Arbor, MI
- Everett L. Bentley, Detroit, MI
- Louis Bleich, Buffalo, NY - appeared as a substitute at left end against M.A.C.
- Cecil Aunger Brown, Chicago, Illinois
- Edgar N. Eisenhower, Abilene, Kansas (older brother of U.S. President Dwight Eisenhower)
- John H. Jay, Shenandoah, Iowa
- Henry W. Lichtner, Grand Rapids, MI
- M. Mathieson, Detroit, MI
- Bernard A. McDonald, Rochester, NY
- Frank M. McHale, Logansport, Indiana - started 3 games at right tackle (M.A.C., Ohio State, and Syracuse); also appeared as a substitute at right tackle against Case
- Leon Ford Merritt, Detroit, MI
- Frank G. Millard, Corunna, MI
- Floyd C. Morse, Detroit, MI
- Walter W. Paisley, Dubuque, Iowa
- John C. Peterson, Le Mars, Iowa - appeared as a substitute at left end against Case and M.A.C.
- Reuben Peterson, Ann Arbor, MI
- Cyril Quinn, Saginaw, MI - appeared as a substitute at fullback against Case and M.A.C.
- Samuel S. Scott, Cranford, New Jersey
- Ben O. Shepard, Detroit, MI
- Emil Tessin, Hemlock, MI - appeared as a substitute at left end against Syracuse
- Walter John Thienes, Indianapolis, Indiana
- John A. Tompkins, Ann Arbor, MI
- Guy Wells, Brewster, Ohio
- Stephen B. Wilson, Newton, Massachusetts
- Charles E. Wyman, Nunica, MI - appeared as a substitute at left end against Case and M.A.C.
- Harry Young, Detroit, MI

=== Scoring leaders ===
Player	Touchdowns	Extra points	Field goals	Points
George C. Thomson	8	1	0	49
Jimmy Craig	4	0	0	24
Herbert Huebel	4	1	0	24
George C. Paterson	0	18	0	18
Tommy Hughitt	2	0	0	12
Miller Pontius	2	0	0	12
Thomas Bushnell	2	0	0	12
Charles Barton	1	0	0	6
Totals	23	20	0	158

== Awards and honors ==
- Captain: George C. Thomson
- All-Americans: Miller Pontius (Alfred Harvey, 1st team)
- All-Western: Miller Pontius (Collier's, Eckersall, Axelson, Foley, Yost); Jimmy Craig (Collier's, Eckersall, Axelson, Foley, Yost); George C. Paterson (Axelson, Yost); Roy Torbet (Yost); Quinn (Yost); George C. Thomson (Yost)

== Coaching staff ==
- Head coach: Fielding H. Yost
- Assistant coaches: Prentiss Douglass (general assistant coach), Frederick Conklin, Curtis Redden, Henry Schulte, Andrew W. Smith
- Trainer: Stephen J. Farrell
- Manager: John K. Coolidge
- Director of Outdoor Athletics: Philip Bartelme
