= Roy Torbet =

American football player (1889–1974)

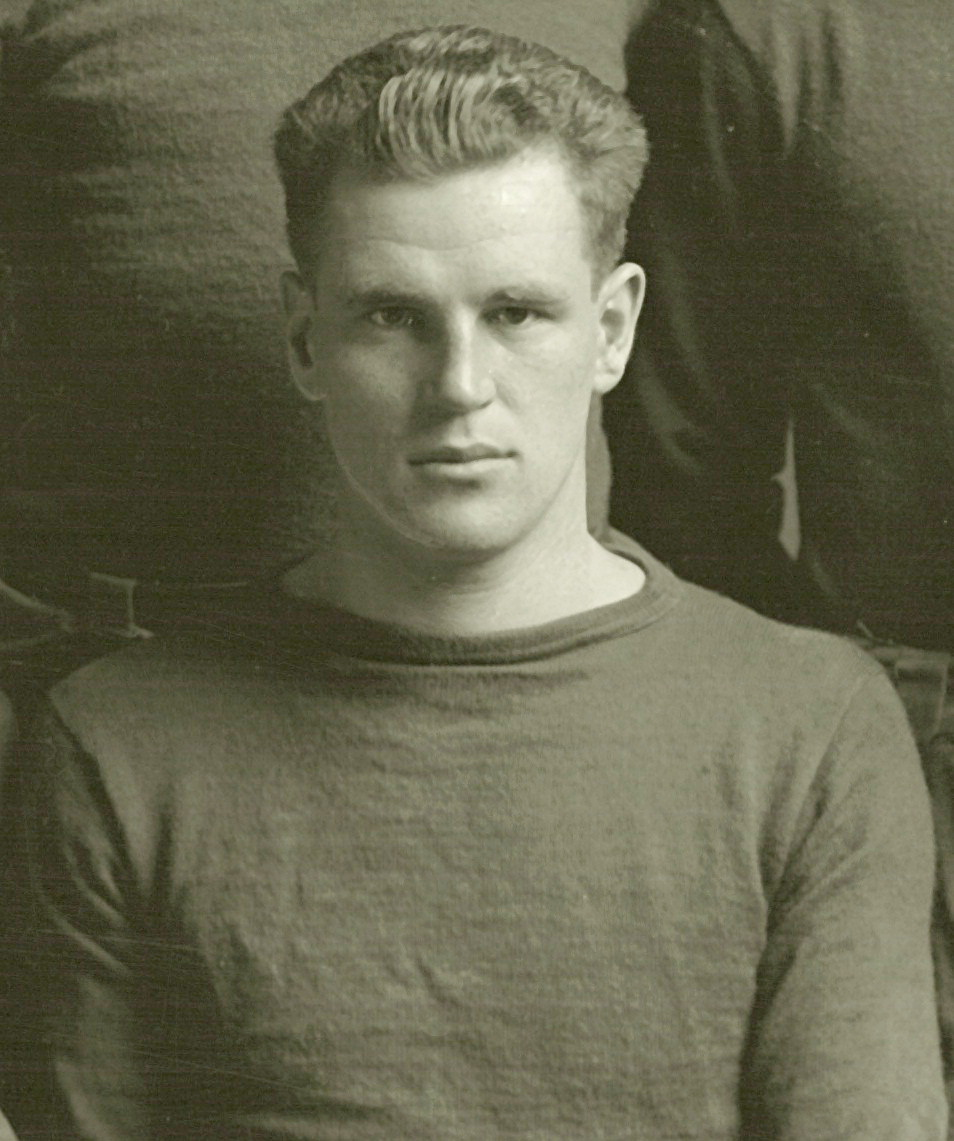
- Torbet cropped from 1912 Michigan team photograph

Profile
- Positions: End, Fullback, Halfback

Personal information
- Born: August 21, 1889
- Died: February 1974 (aged 84)

Career information
- College: Michigan

Career history
- 1910–1913: Michigan

Roy Herman "Squib" Torbet (August 21, 1889 – February 1974) was an American football player. He played at the end and fullback positions for the Michigan Wolverines football teams from 1910 to 1913. He developed a reputation as an excellent forward passer and was one of the earliest Michigan players to have success as a passer.

== Early life ==
A native of Detroit, Michigan, Torbet attended the Detroit public schools. He attended Detroit Central High School and was a star of the school's football teams in 1908 and 1909. After the 1908 season, the school's yearbook noted that Torbet's "sensational playing was a bright feature of every game." He was unanimously selected as the captain of the school's 1909 football team. At Detroit Central, he was a teammate of Jimmy Craig and "Bubbles" Patterson -— both of whom later joined Torbet on the University of Michigan football team.

== University of Michigan ==
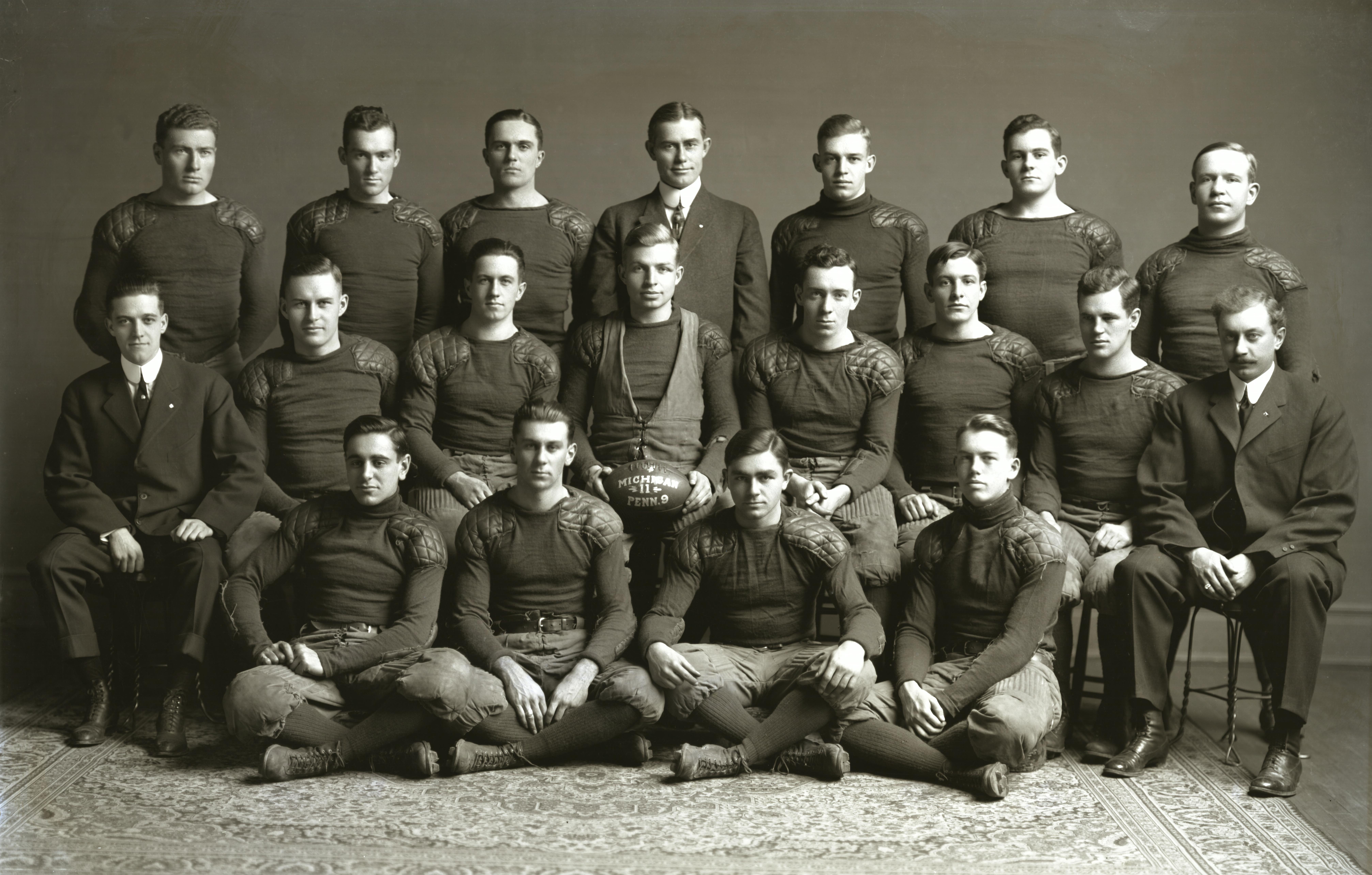
1911 Michigan Wolverines football team

Torbet graduated from high school in 1910 and enrolled at the University of Michigan. He was a reserve on Michigan's football team in 1910, and a three-year starter at the end, fullback and halfback positions from 1911 to 1913. The Wolverines compiled a record of 16-4-2 in Torbet's three years as a starter.

Torbet was one of the earliest Michigan Wolverines football players to have success as a forward passer. The forward pass was not legalized until 1906, and it was not until 1913 (after the success that year of Gus Dorais and Knute Rockne at Notre Dame) that the forward pass was widely popularized.

Two years before Dorais and Rockne popularized the passing game, Torbet developed a reputation as one of the game's best forward passers. The Detroit Free Press wrote that, in 1911, "his long forward passes were largely instrumental in bringing Michigan her victory." In the final game of the 1912 season, on fourth down with seven yards to go in the fourth quarter, Torbet threw a touchdown pass to Miller Pontius to give Michigan the lead against Cornell; Michigan won the game 20–7. The New York Times praised Torbet's work in the "whirlwind finish" against Cornell:

While Cornell did not have as strong a team as was expected, the Wolverines' expert use of the forward pass placed them on a higher plane than they have reached before this fall. ... It was the forward pass that did the work, and to 'Squib' Torbet belongs the glory. His heaves were excellent.

At the end of the 1912 season, Torbet was selected by Fielding H. Yost as a first-team player on his All-Western team.

In early 1913, Torbet announced plans to leave the university, stating that he was not satisfied with the results of his last semester's examinations. However, in late February 1913, he announced that he had reconsidered his decision and would return to the football team in the fall of 1913. The Detroit Free Press reported: "It seems that the forward-passing end was a bit hasty in making up his mind to leave and that when the matter was gone into carefully it was found that he was not in bad shape at all scholastically."

As a senior in 1913, he was moved to the fullback position where he continued to develop a reputation as an effective forward passer. At the end of October 1913, the Detroit Free Press wrote:

The showing of 'Squib' Torbet at fullback this afternoon was the one bright spot in an otherwise dismal scrimmage. ... On his off tackle plunges the new Yost fullback was always good for a gain. He hit low and hard when he came to his opposition and he seldom failed to string out a bunch of tacklers before he was finally stopped, and once he spun a forward pass down the field that was a beauty. ... The aim of Torbet was perfect. The ball went like a streak and was high and true.

== Later life ==
Torbet graduated from the University of Michigan in 1914. In September 1914, he was reportedly hired to teach and coach football at the Colorado School of Mines. (Colorado School of Mines records, however, reflect that William Hanley was the head football coach during the 1914 and 1915 seasons.) He studied sociology at Michigan and, after graduating, devoted himself "to both practical and theoretical sociology." He worked as a supervisor of athletics at Detroit parks. He married Gladys Evelyn Matheson on April 18, 1916, in Detroit. In the fall of 1916, Torbet coached the Timken club football team—a team composed of "mechanics and office men who are employed in the various departments of the big plant of the Timken Detroit Axle company."

Torbet lived in Northville, Michigan in his later years. He died in February 1974 at age 84.
