= John L. Marks =

American college football coach

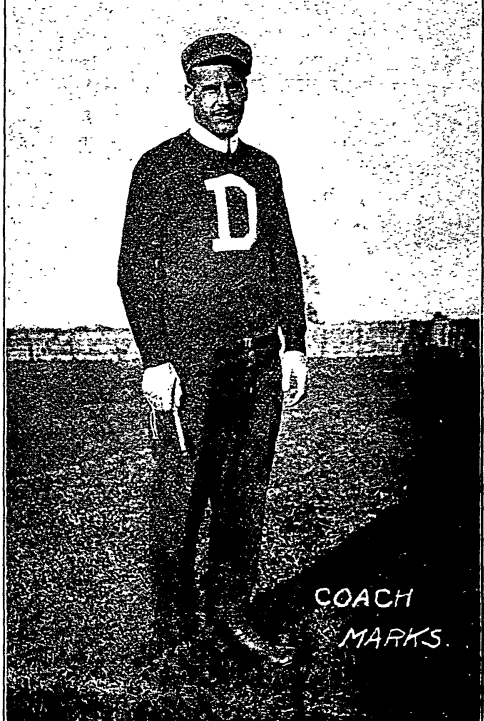
- Marks at Notre Dame, 1912

Playing career
- 1907–1909: Dartmouth
- Positions: Fullback, halfback

Coaching career (HC unless noted)
- 1910: St. Viator
- 1911–1912: Notre Dame

Head coaching record
- Overall: 18–3–2

Accomplishments and honors

Awards
- 2× Second-team All-American (1907, 1909)

John L. Marks was an American football coach. He served as the head football coach at the University of Notre Dame from 1911 to 1912, compiling a record of 13–0–2. Marks played college football at Dartmouth College.

On October 5, 1912, in one of the easiest victories in Notre Dame history, junior quarterback Gus Dorais led the Irish to a 116–7 rout of St. Viator in the season-opener.

== Head coaching record ==
Year	Team	Overall	Conference	Standing	Bowl/playoffs
St. Viator (Independent) (1910)
1910	St. Viator	5–3			
St. Viator:		5–3			
Notre Dame Fighting Irish (Independent) (1911–1912)
1911	Notre Dame	6–0–2			
1912	Notre Dame	7–0			
Notre Dame:		13–0–2			
Total:		18–3–2			
