= 1912 Central Michigan Normalites football team =

American college football season

1912 Central Michigan Normalites football
- Conference: Independent
- Record: 2–1–2
- Head coach: Harry Helmer (4th season)

1912 Midwestern college football independents records
	Conf.			Overall
Team	W	L	T	W		L		T
Notre Dame		–		7	–	0	–	0
Lincoln (MO)		–		1	–	0	–	0
Lake Forest		–		5	–	0	–	1
Michigan Agricultural		–		7	–	1	–	0
North Dakota Agricultural		–		5	–	1	–	0
South Dakota		–		5	–	1	–	0
Mount Union		–		9	–	2	–	0
Saint Louis		–		7	–	1	–	2
Michigan		–		5	–	2	–	0
Wabash		–		5	–	2	–	0
Buchtel		–		5	–	2	–	1
Detroit		–		5	–	2	–	1
Iowa State Teachers		–		5	–	2	–	1
St. Mary's (OH)		–		4	–	2	–	0
Michigan State Normal		–		4	–	2	–	1
Butler		–		5	–	3	–	0
Doane		–		5	–	3	–	0
Haskell		–		7	–	4	–	0
Central Michigan		–		2	–	1	–	2
Western State Normal		–		3	–	2	–	0
St. Viator		–		4	–	4	–	0
Fairmount		–		4	–	5	–	0
Marquette		–		3	–	4	–	0
Northern Illinois State		–		3	–	5	–	0
Baldwin–Wallace		–		0	–	1	–	0
Heidelberg		–		0	–	6	–	0

The 1912 Central Michigan Normalites football team represented Central Michigan Normal School, later renamed Central Michigan University, as an independent during the 1912 college football season. In its fourth and final season under head coach Harry Helmer, the Central Michigan football team compiled a 2–1–2 record.

The team's quarterback Tip Carnahan broke his collarbone during a practice on October 4.

== Schedule ==
Date	Opponent	Site	Result	Source
	Michigan School for the Deaf		W	
October 11	Ithaca High School		W 10–0	
October 26	Alma	Mount Pleasant, MI	L 0–106	
November 9	Michigan State Normal	Mount Pleasant, MI (rivalry)	T 0–0	
November 15	Michigan Agricultural freshmen		L	
