= 1912 Michigan Agricultural Aggies football team =

American college football season

1912 Michigan Agricultural Aggies football
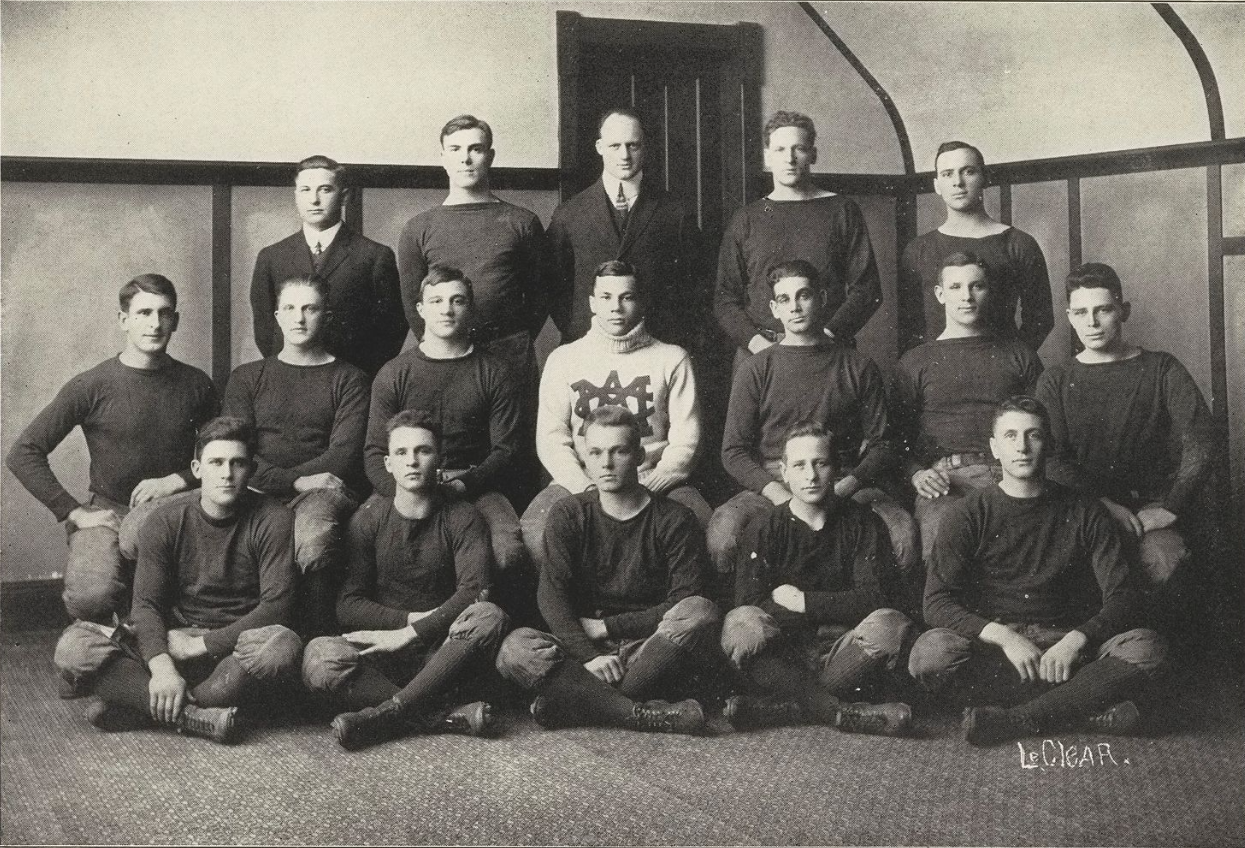
- Conference: Independent
- Record: 7–1
- Head coach: John Macklin (2nd season)
- Captain: William R. Riblett
- Home stadium: College Field

1912 Midwestern college football independents records
	Conf.			Overall
Team	W	L	T	W		L		T
Notre Dame		–		7	–	0	–	0
Lincoln (MO)		–		1	–	0	–	0
Lake Forest		–		5	–	0	–	1
Michigan Agricultural		–		7	–	1	–	0
North Dakota Agricultural		–		5	–	1	–	0
South Dakota		–		5	–	1	–	0
Mount Union		–		9	–	2	–	0
Saint Louis		–		7	–	1	–	2
Michigan		–		5	–	2	–	0
Wabash		–		5	–	2	–	0
Buchtel		–		5	–	2	–	1
Detroit		–		5	–	2	–	1
Iowa State Teachers		–		5	–	2	–	1
St. Mary's (OH)		–		4	–	2	–	0
Michigan State Normal		–		4	–	2	–	1
Butler		–		5	–	3	–	0
Doane		–		5	–	3	–	0
Haskell		–		7	–	4	–	0
Central Michigan		–		2	–	1	–	2
Western State Normal		–		3	–	2	–	0
St. Viator		–		4	–	4	–	0
Fairmount		–		4	–	5	–	0
Marquette		–		3	–	4	–	0
Northern Illinois State		–		3	–	5	–	0
Baldwin–Wallace		–		0	–	1	–	0
Heidelberg		–		0	–	6	–	0

The 1912 Michigan Agricultural Aggies football team represented Michigan Agricultural College (MAC) as an independent during the 1912 college football season. In their second year under head coach John Macklin, the Aggies compiled a 7–1 record and outscored their opponents 297 to 98.

== Schedule ==
Date	Opponent	Site	Result
October 5	Alma	College Field; East Lansing, MI	W 14–3
October 12	at Michigan	Ferry Field; Ann Arbor, MI (rivalry)	L 7–55
October 19	Olivet	College Field; East Lansing, MI	W 52–0
October 26	DePauw	College Field; East Lansing, MI	W 58–0
November 2	Ohio Wesleyan	College Field; East Lansing, MI	W 46–0
November 9	Mount Union	College Field; East Lansing, MI	W 61–20
November 16	Wabash	College Field; East Lansing, MI	W 24–0
November 28	at Ohio State	Ohio Field; Columbus, OH	W 35–20

== Game summaries ==
=== Michigan ===
Michigan Agricultural at Michigan

Team	1	2	3	4	Total
Michigan Agricultural	7	0	0	0	7
• Michigan	0	7	14	34	55

- Date: October 12, 1912
- Location: Ferry Field
  Ann Arbor, MI
- Referee: J. C. Holderness (Lehigh)

On October 12, 1912, the Aggies lost to Michigan by a 55 to 7 score at Ferry Field. It was the seventh game in the Michigan - Michigan State football rivalry, and Michigan had a 5–0–1 record in the six prior meetings, outscoring the Aggies by a combined total of 225 to 6. The Aggies took a 7–0 lead in the first quarter on an 85-yard interception return by left end Blake Miller. The touchdown was the first ever scored by a Michigan Aggies team against Michigan. Michigan tied the score in the second quarter and added 48 points in the second half. Michigan scored eight touchdowns in the game. The game was played in 15-minute quarters.
