= 1912 Western State Normal Hilltoppers football team =

American college football season

1912 Western State Normal Hilltoppers football
- Conference: Independent
- Record: 3–2–1
- Head coach: William H. Spaulding (6th season)
- Captain: Edgar Roper
- Home stadium: Woodward Avenue grounds

1912 Midwestern college football independents records
	Conf.			Overall
Team	W	L	T	W		L		T
Notre Dame		–		7	–	0	–	0
Lincoln (MO)		–		1	–	0	–	0
Lake Forest		–		5	–	0	–	1
Michigan Agricultural		–		7	–	1	–	0
North Dakota Agricultural		–		5	–	1	–	0
South Dakota		–		5	–	1	–	0
Mount Union		–		9	–	2	–	0
Saint Louis		–		7	–	1	–	2
Michigan		–		5	–	2	–	0
Wabash		–		5	–	2	–	0
Buchtel		–		5	–	2	–	1
Detroit		–		5	–	2	–	1
Iowa State Teachers		–		5	–	2	–	1
St. Mary's (OH)		–		4	–	2	–	0
Michigan State Normal		–		4	–	2	–	1
Butler		–		5	–	3	–	0
Doane		–		5	–	3	–	0
Haskell		–		7	–	4	–	0
Central Michigan		–		2	–	1	–	2
Western State Normal		–		3	–	2	–	0
St. Viator		–		4	–	4	–	0
Fairmount		–		4	–	5	–	0
Marquette		–		3	–	4	–	0
Northern Illinois State		–		3	–	5	–	0
Baldwin–Wallace		–		0	–	1	–	0
Heidelberg		–		0	–	6	–	0

The 1912 Western State State Normal Hilltoppers football team represented Western State Normal School (later renamed Western Michigan University) as an independent during the 1912 college football season. In their sixth season under head coach William H. Spaulding, the Hilltoppers compiled a 3–2–1 record. End Edgar Roper was the team captain.

Attendance at Western State reached 650 students in the fall of 1912.

== Schedule ==
Date	Time	Opponent	Site	Result	Source
October 12		at Culver Military Academy	Culver, IN	W 19–13	
October 19	2:30 p.m.	Michigan Agricultural freshman	Woodward Avenue grounds; Kalamazoo, MI	L 0–20	
October 26		at Albion	Albion, MI	W 7–3	
November 2		at Hope	Holland, MI	W 46–0	
November 9	2:30 p.m.	Hillsdale	Woodward Avenue grounds; Kalamazoo, MI	T 7–7	
November 15		at Michigan State Normal	Ypsilanti, MI	L 0–7	
