= 1912 Haskell Indians football team =

American college football season

1912 Haskell Indians football
- Conference: Independent
- Record: 7–4
- Head coach: A. R. Kennedy (2nd season)
- Home stadium: Haskell Field

1912 Midwestern college football independents records
	Conf.			Overall
Team	W	L	T	W		L		T
Notre Dame		–		7	–	0	–	0
Lincoln (MO)		–		1	–	0	–	0
Lake Forest		–		5	–	0	–	1
Michigan Agricultural		–		7	–	1	–	0
North Dakota Agricultural		–		5	–	1	–	0
South Dakota		–		5	–	1	–	0
Mount Union		–		9	–	2	–	0
Saint Louis		–		7	–	1	–	2
Michigan		–		5	–	2	–	0
Wabash		–		5	–	2	–	0
Buchtel		–		5	–	2	–	1
Detroit		–		5	–	2	–	1
Iowa State Teachers		–		5	–	2	–	1
St. Mary's (OH)		–		4	–	2	–	0
Michigan State Normal		–		4	–	2	–	1
Butler		–		5	–	3	–	0
Doane		–		5	–	3	–	0
Haskell		–		7	–	4	–	0
Central Michigan		–		2	–	1	–	2
Western State Normal		–		3	–	2	–	0
St. Viator		–		4	–	4	–	0
Fairmount		–		4	–	5	–	0
Marquette		–		3	–	4	–	0
Northern Illinois State		–		3	–	5	–	0
Baldwin–Wallace		–		0	–	1	–	0
Heidelberg		–		0	–	6	–	0

The 1912 Haskell Indians football team was an American football team that represented the Haskell Indian Institute (now known as Haskell Indian Nations University) as an independent during the 1912 college football season. In its second season under head coach A. R. Kennedy, Haskell compiled a 7–4 record and outscored opponents by a total of 209 to 94. The team lost close games to Kansas State, Texas, and undefeated Christian Brothers.

Leo Roque was the team's best all-around player and won a place on the All-Kansas football team for 1912. Bill Mzhicteno was named to the All-Kansas second team. The team captain Williams and John Artichoker were named to the third team.

== Schedule ==
Date	Opponent	Site	Result	Source
September 26	Baker	Haskell Field; Lawrence, KS	W 21–6	
October 5	at Kansas State	Ahearn Field; Manhattan, KS	L 14–21	
October 11	William Jewell	Lawrence, KS	W 1–0 (forfeit)	
October 14	at Ottawa	Ottawa College gridiron; Ottawa, KS	W 23–6	
October 19	Wentworth Military Academy	Lawrence, KS	W 82–0	
October 26	at Texas	Clark Field; Austin, TX	L 7–14	
November 2	at Denver	Denver, CO	W 12–10	
November 9	Kansas City Vets	Lawrence, KS	W 13–2	
November 12	Kansas freshmen	Haskell Field; Lawrence, KS	W 13–6	
November 22	at College of Emporia	Emporia, KS	L 17–21	
November 28	at Christian Brothers (MO)	Sportsman's Park; St. Louis, MO	L 6–9	
