= 1912 Lincoln Tigers football team =

American college football season

1912 Lincoln Tigers football
- Conference: Independent
- Record: 1–0

1912 Midwestern college football independents records
	Conf.			Overall
Team	W	L	T	W		L		T
Notre Dame		–		7	–	0	–	0
Lincoln (MO)		–		1	–	0	–	0
Lake Forest		–		5	–	0	–	1
Michigan Agricultural		–		7	–	1	–	0
North Dakota Agricultural		–		5	–	1	–	0
South Dakota		–		5	–	1	–	0
Mount Union		–		9	–	2	–	0
Saint Louis		–		7	–	1	–	2
Michigan		–		5	–	2	–	0
Wabash		–		5	–	2	–	0
Buchtel		–		5	–	2	–	1
Detroit		–		5	–	2	–	1
Iowa State Teachers		–		5	–	2	–	1
St. Mary's (OH)		–		4	–	2	–	0
Michigan State Normal		–		4	–	2	–	1
Butler		–		5	–	3	–	0
Doane		–		5	–	3	–	0
Haskell		–		7	–	4	–	0
Central Michigan		–		2	–	1	–	2
Western State Normal		–		3	–	2	–	0
St. Viator		–		4	–	4	–	0
Fairmount		–		4	–	5	–	0
Marquette		–		3	–	4	–	0
Northern Illinois State		–		3	–	5	–	0
Baldwin–Wallace		–		0	–	1	–	0
Heidelberg		–		0	–	6	–	0

The 1912 Lincoln Blue Tigers football team represented Lincoln Institute—now known as Lincoln University—in Jefferson City, Missouri as an independent during the 1912 college football season. The Tigers compiled a record of 1–0 after defeating the Columbia Stars on the road. Available information is sparse for this season.

== Schedule ==
Date	Opponent	Site	Result	Source
October 28	at Columbia Stars	Fair Grounds; Columbia, MO	W 20–6	
