= 1912 St. Viator football team =

American college football season

1912 St. Viator football
- Conference: Independent
- Record: 4–4
- Head coach: Elias Kelly (1st season)

1912 Midwestern college football independents records
	Conf.			Overall
Team	W	L	T	W		L		T
Notre Dame		–		7	–	0	–	0
Lincoln (MO)		–		1	–	0	–	0
Lake Forest		–		5	–	0	–	1
Michigan Agricultural		–		7	–	1	–	0
North Dakota Agricultural		–		5	–	1	–	0
South Dakota		–		5	–	1	–	0
Mount Union		–		9	–	2	–	0
Saint Louis		–		7	–	1	–	2
Michigan		–		5	–	2	–	0
Wabash		–		5	–	2	–	0
Buchtel		–		5	–	2	–	1
Detroit		–		5	–	2	–	1
Iowa State Teachers		–		5	–	2	–	1
St. Mary's (OH)		–		4	–	2	–	0
Michigan State Normal		–		4	–	2	–	1
Butler		–		5	–	3	–	0
Doane		–		5	–	3	–	0
Haskell		–		7	–	4	–	0
Central Michigan		–		2	–	1	–	2
Western State Normal		–		3	–	2	–	0
St. Viator		–		4	–	4	–	0
Fairmount		–		4	–	5	–	0
Marquette		–		3	–	4	–	0
Northern Illinois State		–		3	–	5	–	0
Baldwin–Wallace		–		0	–	1	–	0
Heidelberg		–		0	–	6	–	0

The 1912 St. Viator football team represented St. Viator College during the 1912 college football season. The team compiled a 4–4, but was outscored 229 to 117, largely due to a 116–7 loss to Notre Dame in early October.

== Schedule ==
Date	Opponent	Site	Result	Source
September 28	at Grand Prairie Seminary	Onarga, IL	W 19–0	
October 5	at Notre Dame	Cartier Field; Notre Dame, IN	L 7–116	
October 19	Chicago Veterinary	Bourbonnais, IL	W 13–0	
October 26	at Christian Brothers (MO)	St. Louis, MO	L 0–61	
November 2	Dixon College	Bourbonnais, IL	L 19–26	
November 9	at Loyola (IL)	Chicago, IL	W 13–0	
November 17	St. Viator alumni	Bourbonnais, IL	W 34–7	
November 28	at DePaul	Chicago, IL	L 12–19	
