= 1912 Michigan State Normal Normalites football team =

American college football season

1912 Michigan State Normal Normalites football
- Conference: Independent
- Record: 4–2–1
- Head coach: Leroy Brown (1st season)
- Captain: S. B. Crouse

1912 Midwestern college football independents records
	Conf.			Overall
Team	W	L	T	W		L		T
Notre Dame		–		7	–	0	–	0
Lincoln (MO)		–		1	–	0	–	0
Lake Forest		–		5	–	0	–	1
Michigan Agricultural		–		7	–	1	–	0
North Dakota Agricultural		–		5	–	1	–	0
South Dakota		–		5	–	1	–	0
Mount Union		–		9	–	2	–	0
Saint Louis		–		7	–	1	–	2
Michigan		–		5	–	2	–	0
Wabash		–		5	–	2	–	0
Buchtel		–		5	–	2	–	1
Detroit		–		5	–	2	–	1
Iowa State Teachers		–		5	–	2	–	1
St. Mary's (OH)		–		4	–	2	–	0
Michigan State Normal		–		4	–	2	–	1
Butler		–		5	–	3	–	0
Doane		–		5	–	3	–	0
Haskell		–		7	–	4	–	0
Central Michigan		–		2	–	1	–	2
Western State Normal		–		3	–	2	–	0
St. Viator		–		4	–	4	–	0
Fairmount		–		4	–	5	–	0
Marquette		–		3	–	4	–	0
Northern Illinois State		–		3	–	5	–	0
Baldwin–Wallace		–		0	–	1	–	0
Heidelberg		–		0	–	6	–	0

The 1912 Michigan State Normal Normalites football team represented Michigan State Normal College (later renamed Eastern Michigan University) as an independent during the 1912 college football season. In their first season under head coach Leroy Brown, the Normalites compiled a record of 4–2–1 and outscored their opponents by a combined total of 83 to 45. For the second consecutive year, S. B. Crouse was the team captain.

== Schedule ==
Date	Opponent	Site	Result	Source
October 19	Michigan School for the Deaf	Ypsilanti, MI	W 20–7	
October 26	Alumni	Ypsilanti, MI	W 9–0	
October 29	Cleary	Ypsilanti, MI	W 33–0	
November 2	at Assumption (ON)	Windsor, ON	L 0–12	
November 8	at Central Michigan	Mount Pleasant, MI (rivalry)	T 0–0	
November 15	Western State Normal	Ypsilanti, MI	W 7–0	
November 23	Hillsdale	Ypsilanti, MI	L 14–26	
