= 1912 Northern Illinois State Normal football team =

American college football season

1912 Northern Illinois State Normal football
- Conference: Independent
- Record: 3–5
- Head coach: William Wirtz (3rd season)
- Captain: William Baker
- Home stadium: Glidden Field

1912 Midwestern college football independents records
	Conf.			Overall
Team	W	L	T	W		L		T
Notre Dame		–		7	–	0	–	0
Lincoln (MO)		–		1	–	0	–	0
Lake Forest		–		5	–	0	–	1
Michigan Agricultural		–		7	–	1	–	0
North Dakota Agricultural		–		5	–	1	–	0
South Dakota		–		5	–	1	–	0
Mount Union		–		9	–	2	–	0
Saint Louis		–		7	–	1	–	2
Michigan		–		5	–	2	–	0
Wabash		–		5	–	2	–	0
Buchtel		–		5	–	2	–	1
Detroit		–		5	–	2	–	1
Iowa State Teachers		–		5	–	2	–	1
St. Mary's (OH)		–		4	–	2	–	0
Michigan State Normal		–		4	–	2	–	1
Butler		–		5	–	3	–	0
Doane		–		5	–	3	–	0
Haskell		–		7	–	4	–	0
Central Michigan		–		2	–	1	–	2
Western State Normal		–		3	–	2	–	0
St. Viator		–		4	–	4	–	0
Fairmount		–		4	–	5	–	0
Marquette		–		3	–	4	–	0
Northern Illinois State		–		3	–	5	–	0
Baldwin–Wallace		–		0	–	1	–	0
Heidelberg		–		0	–	6	–	0

The 1912 Northern Illinois State Normal football team represented Northern Illinois State Normal College as an independent in the 1912 college football season. They were led by third-year head coach William Wirtz and played their home games at Glidden Field, located on the east end of campus. The team finished the season with a 3–5 record. William Baker was the team's captain.

== Schedule ==
Date	Opponent	Site	Result	Source
September 21	at Elgin High School	Elgin, IL	L 6–7	
September 28	at Beloit	Beloit, WI	L 0–65	
October 5	DeKalb All-Stars	Glidden Field; DeKalb, IL	L 0–14	
October 12	Alumni	Glidden Field; DeKalb, IL	W 47–0	
October 19	Wheaton (IL)	Glidden Field; DeKalb, IL	W 114–7	
October 26	at Dixon	Dixon, IL	L 7–37	
November 9	at East Aurora High School	Aurora, IL	W 33–10	
November 16	at Clinton High School	Clinton, IA	L 7–27	
