= Harry Helmer =

American football player and sports coach (1884–1971)

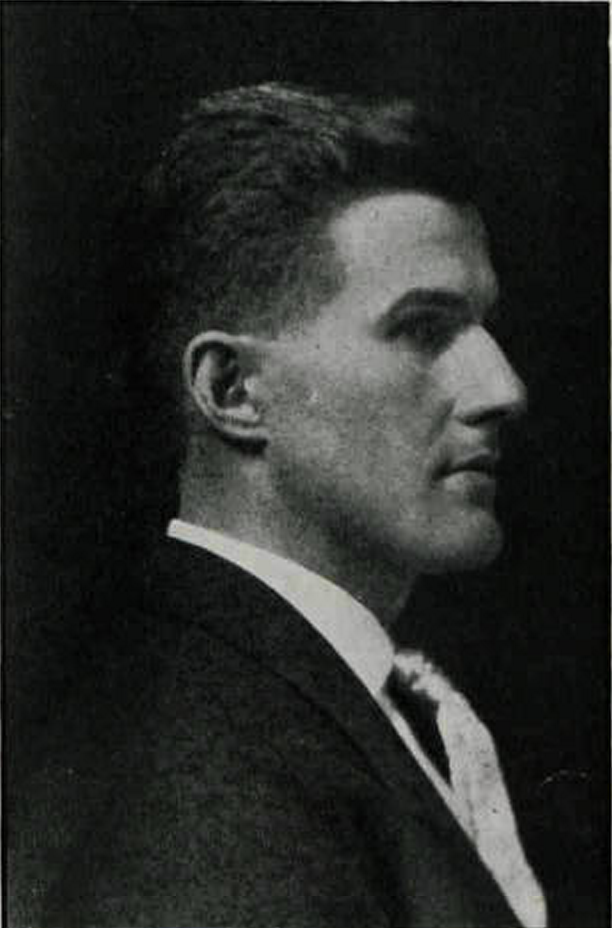
- Helmer pictured in Cheppewa 1910, Central Michigan yearbook

Biographical details
- Born: November 26, 1884; Sandstone Charter Township, Michigan, U.S.
- Died: April 11, 1971 (aged 86); Jackson, Michigan, U.S.

Playing career

Football
- 1905–1907: Alma

Coaching career (HC unless noted)

Football
- 1909–1912: Central Michigan
- 1916–1917: Alma

Basketball
- 1910–1916: Central Michigan
- 1916–1918: Alma

Baseball
- 1910–1916: Central Michigan

Head coaching record
- Overall: 26–13–3 (football); 50–40 (basketball); 33–26–2 (baseball)

Accomplishments and honors

Championships
- Football; 1 MIAA (1917)

Harry William Helmer (November 26, 1884 – April 11, 1971) was an American college football, college basketball, and college baseball coach. He served as the head football coach at Central Michigan Normal School—now known as Central Michigan University—from 1909 to 1912 and Alma College in 1916 and 1917. Helmer was also the head basketball coach at Central Michigan from 1910 to 1916 and at Alma from 1916 to 1918, amassing a career college basketball coaching mark of 50–40. In addition, he was the head baseball coach at Central Michigan from 1910 to 1916, tallying a mark of 33–26–2.

Helmer was an alumnus of Alma College who also studied at Columbia University. While at Alma, Helmer played on the football, baseball, basketball, and track and field teams. He later served for many years as the superintendent of schools in Alma, Michigan. We was also served 18 years as a supervisor of Parma Township and was the director of the welfare department in Jackson County, Michigan, from 1944 to 1954.

Helmer was married to Hazel Potter. They had a son, Hal, and a daughter, Wilhelmina. He died in a hospital in Jackson, Michigan, in 1971.

== Head coaching record ==
=== Football ===
Year	Team	Overall	Conference	Standing	Bowl/playoffs
Central Michigan Normalites (Independent) (1909–1912)
1909	Central Michigan	4–3			
1910	Central Michigan	6–1–1			
1911	Central Michigan	3–3			
1912	Central Michigan	2–1–2			
Central Michigan:		15–8–3			
Alma Maroon and Cream (Michigan Intercollegiate Athletic Association) (1916–1917)
1916	Alma	5–4			
1917	Alma	6–1	4–0	1st	
Alma:		11–5			
Total:		26–13–3			
National championship Conference title Conference division title or championship game berth
