= Herbert Huebel =

American football player, coach, and official (1889–1950)

- Photograph of Huebel cropped from 1912 Michigan Wolverines football team portrait

Biographical details
- Born: November 21, 1889; Nadeau, Michigan, U.S.
- Died: November 6, 1950 (aged 60); Los Angeles, California, U.S.

Playing career
- 1908: St. Thomas (MN)
- 1911–1912: Michigan
- Positions: Quarterback, halfback

Coaching career (HC unless noted)
- 1913–1914: Rose Polytechnic

Herbert Henry "Hub" Huebel (November 21, 1889 – November 6, 1950) was an American football player, coach, and official. He played at the halfback and quarterback positions for the University of Michigan in 1911 and 1912.

== Early years ==
Huebel was born in 1889 at Nadeau, in Menominee County in Michigan's Upper Peninsula. His father, Charles J. Huebel, was a businessman in Menominee County, whose business interests included the C.J. Huebel Company, producers and wholesalers of cedar posts, poles and other cedar products. At the time of the 1900 U.S. Census, Huebel was living in Menominee, Michigan, with his parents, C. J. Huebel and Zelia J. Huebel, and three younger brothers Archie, Robert and Norman Huebel. Huebel played quarterback for the football team at Menominee High School, graduating in 1908.

Before enrolling at the University of Michigan, Huebel attended the College of St. Thomas in Minnesota. He played quarterback for the College of St. Thomas football team.

== University of Michigan ==
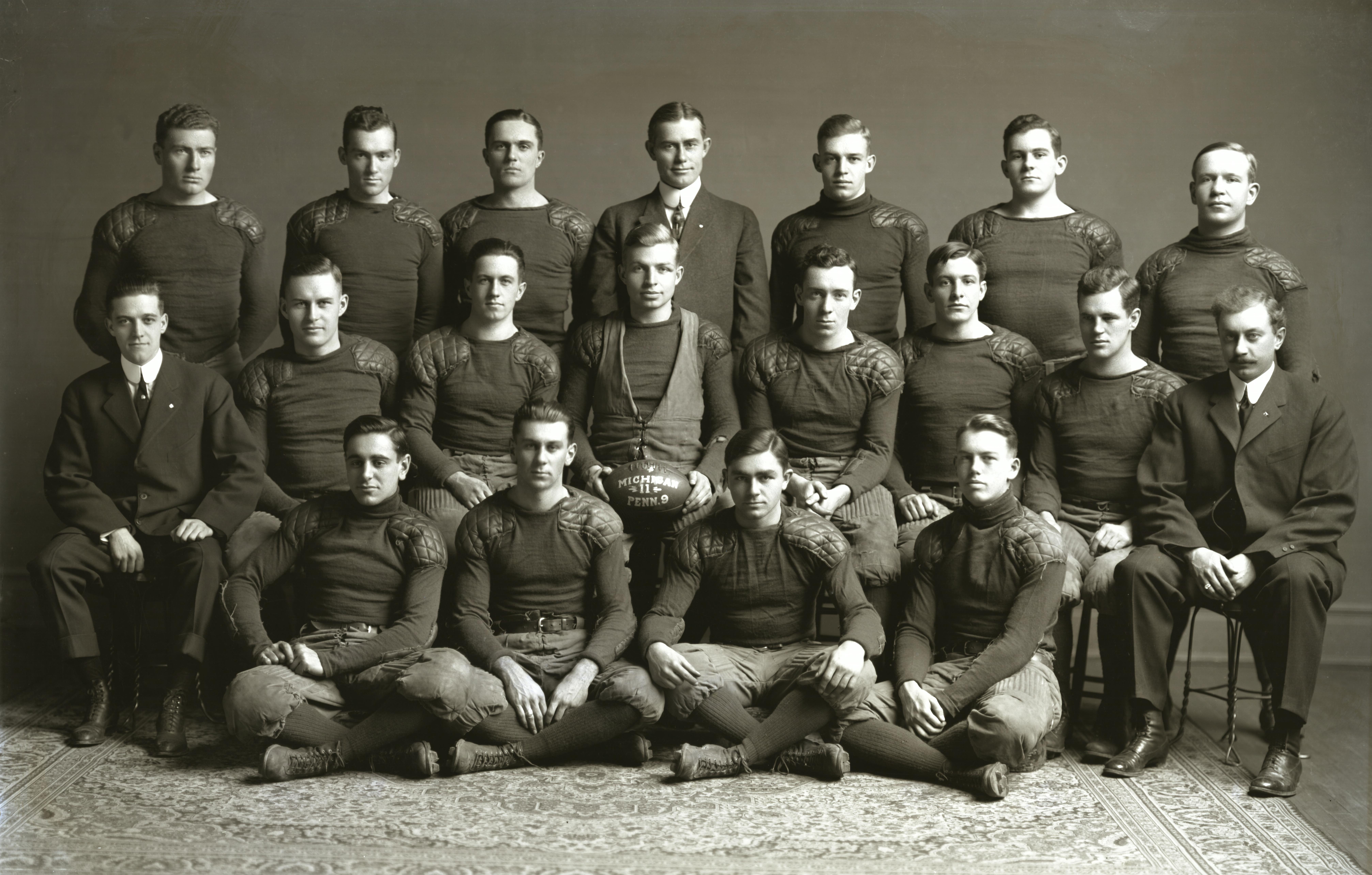
1911 Michigan Wolverines football team

He played college football for the Michigan Wolverines as a member of the freshman team in 1909, and as a member of the varsity team in 1911 and 1912. In 1911, Huebel won a varsity letter as a halfback for the Michigan football team that finished with a record of 5–1–2. In 1912, he won a second varsity letter as the starting quarterback for the Michigan team that finished with a record of 5–2. In January 1913, Huebel announced that he would not return to the football team in 1913, deciding to give up his school work and enter business with his father.

== Coaching career ==
In 1913, Huebel was hired as the football coach at Rose Polytechnic Institute in Terre Haute, Indiana. He served as the head coach at Rose Polytech during the 1913 and 1914 seasons.

== Later years ==
In a draft registration card completed in June 1917, Huebel listed his residence at 2197 Divisadero Street in San Francisco, California. He was at that time working as the office manager for Belber Trunk & Bag Co. at 938 Mission Street in San Francisco. He indicated he had previously served two years with the rank of first lieutenant in the Minnesota infantry. At the time of the 1920 U.S. Census, Huebel was employed as the office manager of a trunk company and living in San Francisco with his father, Christian J. Huebel, his mother Zelia Huebel, his wife Marie Huebel, and his son Herbert Henry Huebel, Jr. At the time of the 1930 U.S. Census, Huebel was living in Seattle, Washington, with his wife Marie and son Jack H. Huebel.

Huebel remained actively associated with college football throughout his life. In 1922, he was the President of the Pacific Coast Football Association, and wrote the section of Spalding's "Official Intercollegiate Foot Ball Guide" concerning "Football in California." Between 1921 and 1942, Huebel served as a frequent umpire for Pacific Coast Conference football games, Rose Bowl games, and East-West Shrine Games. He was the umpire in the USC-UCLA football game played on December 6, 1941, the day before the Japanese attack on Pearl Harbor. After the 1922 Rose Bowl, Washington & Jefferson supporters claimed that their team had been "robbed" of a touchdown in a scoreless game against the University of California, due to an offside penalty called by Huebel. In 1947, The Michigan Alumnus reported that Huebel "was one of the most popular and busiest gridiron watchdogs out on the Pacific Coast for years." Huebel reportedly related "with glee the story of a five hundred dollar fee he received for one important game."

Huebel died on November 6, 1950, in Los Angeles, California.
