= 1912 Saint Louis Billikens football team =

American college football season

1912 Saint Louis Billikens football
- Conference: Independent
- Record: 7–2
- Head coach: Frank Dennie (1st season)
- Captain: Snyder (left end)
- Home stadium: Sportsman's Park

1912 Midwestern college football independents records
	Conf.			Overall
Team	W	L	T	W		L		T
Notre Dame		–		7	–	0	–	0
Lincoln (MO)		–		1	–	0	–	0
Lake Forest		–		5	–	0	–	1
Michigan Agricultural		–		7	–	1	–	0
North Dakota Agricultural		–		5	–	1	–	0
South Dakota		–		5	–	1	–	0
Mount Union		–		9	–	2	–	0
Saint Louis		–		7	–	1	–	2
Michigan		–		5	–	2	–	0
Wabash		–		5	–	2	–	0
Buchtel		–		5	–	2	–	1
Detroit		–		5	–	2	–	1
Iowa State Teachers		–		5	–	2	–	1
St. Mary's (OH)		–		4	–	2	–	0
Michigan State Normal		–		4	–	2	–	1
Butler		–		5	–	3	–	0
Doane		–		5	–	3	–	0
Haskell		–		7	–	4	–	0
Central Michigan		–		2	–	1	–	2
Western State Normal		–		3	–	2	–	0
St. Viator		–		4	–	4	–	0
Fairmount		–		4	–	5	–	0
Marquette		–		3	–	4	–	0
Northern Illinois State		–		3	–	5	–	0
Baldwin–Wallace		–		0	–	1	–	0
Heidelberg		–		0	–	6	–	0

The 1912 Saint Louis Billikens football team was an American football team that represented Saint Louis University as an independent during the 1912 college football season. In their second season under head coach Frank Dennie, the Billikens compiled a 7–2 record and outscored opponents by a total of 201 to 80. The team played its home games at Sportsman's Park at St. Louis.

== Schedule ==
Date	Opponent	Site	Result	Attendance	Source
September 28	Shurtleff	St. Louis, MO	W 16–0		
October 5	Drury	St. Louis, MO	W 34–0		
October 12	Westminster (MO)	St. Louis, MO	W 33–0		
October 19	Missouri Mines	St. Louis, MO	W 13–0		
October 26	Miami (OH)	St. Louis, MO	W 35–0		
November 2	at Creighton	Omaha, NE	W 28–3		
November 9	Notre Dame	St. Louis, MO	L 7–47		
November 16	Marquette	St. Louis, MO	W 20–6		
November 28	Holy Cross	Sportsman's Park; St. Louis, MO	L 15–24	8,000	
