= 1912 South Dakota Coyotes football team =

American college football season

1912 South Dakota Coyotes football
- Conference: Independent
- Record: 5–1
- Head coach: James Henderson (2nd season)

1912 Midwestern college football independents records
	Conf.			Overall
Team	W	L	T	W		L		T
Notre Dame		–		7	–	0	–	0
Lincoln (MO)		–		1	–	0	–	0
Lake Forest		–		5	–	0	–	1
Michigan Agricultural		–		7	–	1	–	0
North Dakota Agricultural		–		5	–	1	–	0
South Dakota		–		5	–	1	–	0
Mount Union		–		9	–	2	–	0
Saint Louis		–		7	–	1	–	2
Michigan		–		5	–	2	–	0
Wabash		–		5	–	2	–	0
Buchtel		–		5	–	2	–	1
Detroit		–		5	–	2	–	1
Iowa State Teachers		–		5	–	2	–	1
St. Mary's (OH)		–		4	–	2	–	0
Michigan State Normal		–		4	–	2	–	1
Butler		–		5	–	3	–	0
Doane		–		5	–	3	–	0
Haskell		–		7	–	4	–	0
Central Michigan		–		2	–	1	–	2
Western State Normal		–		3	–	2	–	0
St. Viator		–		4	–	4	–	0
Fairmount		–		4	–	5	–	0
Marquette		–		3	–	4	–	0
Northern Illinois State		–		3	–	5	–	0
Baldwin–Wallace		–		0	–	1	–	0
Heidelberg		–		0	–	6	–	0

The 1912 South Dakota Coyotes football team was an American football team that represented the University of South Dakota as an independent during the 1912 college football season. In its second season under head coach James Henderson, the team compiled a 5–1 record and outscored them by a total of 240 to 13.

== Schedule ==
Date	Opponent	Site	Result	Attendance	Source
September 28	at Minnesota	Northrop Field; Minneapolis, MN	W 10–0	3,500	
October 12	Nebraska Wesleyan	Vermillion, SD	W 39–0		
October 26	South Dakota State	Vermillion, SD (rivalry)	W 73–7		
November 2	at Michigan	Ferry Field; Ann Arbor, MI	L 6–7		
November 9	vs. North Dakota	Sioux Falls, SD (rivalry)	W 44–0	3,500	
November 28	at Creighton	Creighton field; Omaha, NE	W 68–0		
