= 1912 Buchtel football team =

American college football season

1912 Buchtel football
- Conference: Independent
- Record: 5–2–1
- Head coach: Frank Haggerty (3rd season)
- Captain: Charles Criss

1912 Midwestern college football independents records
	Conf.			Overall
Team	W	L	T	W		L		T
Notre Dame		–		7	–	0	–	0
Lincoln (MO)		–		1	–	0	–	0
Lake Forest		–		5	–	0	–	1
Michigan Agricultural		–		7	–	1	–	0
North Dakota Agricultural		–		5	–	1	–	0
South Dakota		–		5	–	1	–	0
Mount Union		–		9	–	2	–	0
Saint Louis		–		7	–	1	–	2
Michigan		–		5	–	2	–	0
Wabash		–		5	–	2	–	0
Buchtel		–		5	–	2	–	1
Detroit		–		5	–	2	–	1
Iowa State Teachers		–		5	–	2	–	1
St. Mary's (OH)		–		4	–	2	–	0
Michigan State Normal		–		4	–	2	–	1
Butler		–		5	–	3	–	0
Doane		–		5	–	3	–	0
Haskell		–		7	–	4	–	0
Central Michigan		–		2	–	1	–	2
Western State Normal		–		3	–	2	–	0
St. Viator		–		4	–	4	–	0
Fairmount		–		4	–	5	–	0
Marquette		–		3	–	4	–	0
Northern Illinois State		–		3	–	5	–	0
Baldwin–Wallace		–		0	–	1	–	0
Heidelberg		–		0	–	6	–	0

The 1912 Buchtel football team represented Buchtel College in the 1912 college football season. The team was led by head coach Frank Haggerty, in his third season. Buchtel outscored their opponents by a total of 105–36.

== Schedule ==
Date	Opponent	Site	Result
September 28	Case	Akron, OH	W 3–0
October 5	Ohio Northern	Akron, OH	W 30–13
October 12	Western Reserve	Akron, OH	L 0–7
October 19	Hiram	Akron, OH	W 32–3
October 26	at Mount Union	Hartshorn Field; Alliance, OH	L 0–13
November 2	Ohio	Akron, OH	W 27–0
November 9	Allegheny	Akron, OH	T 0–0
November 16	Marietta	Akron, OH	W 12–0
