= 1912 Notre Dame Fighting Irish football team =

American college football season

1912 Notre Dame Fighting Irish football
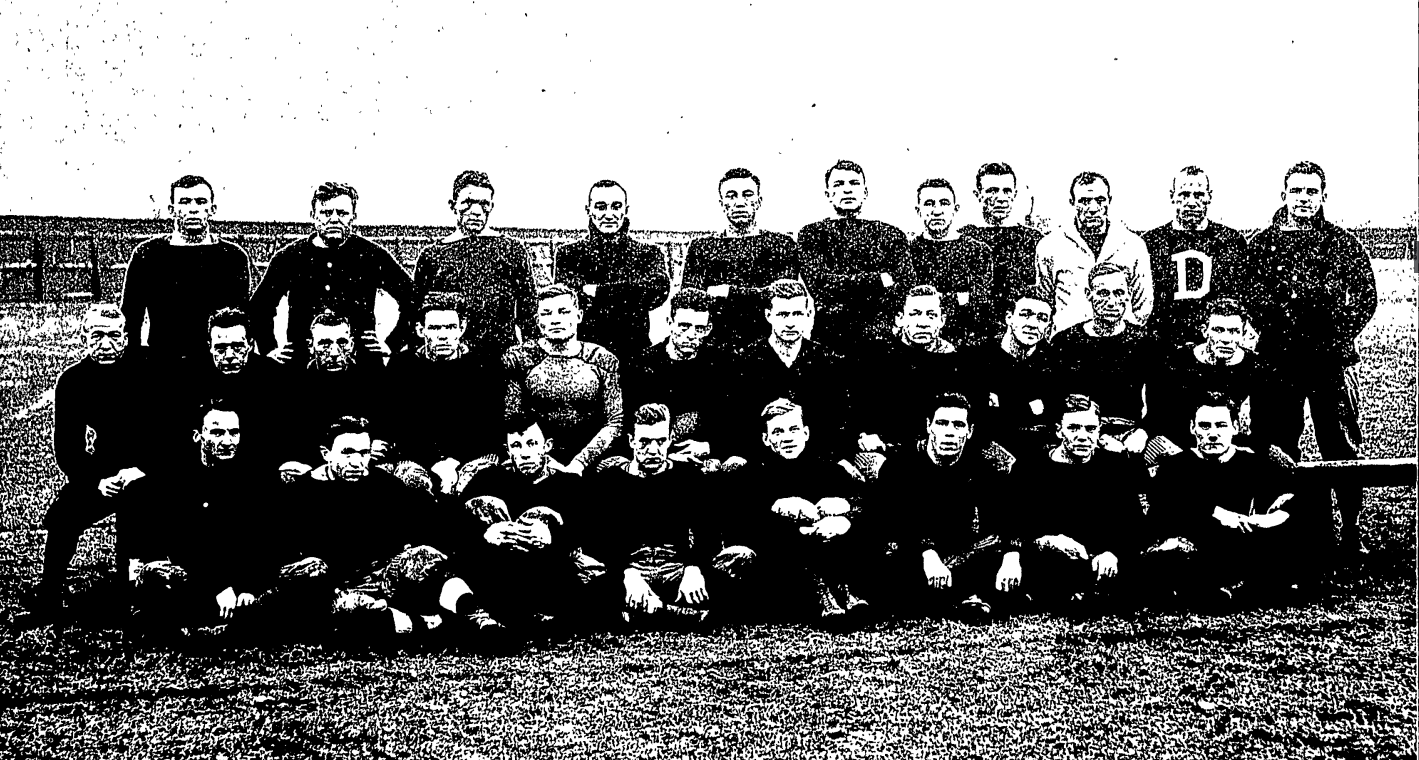
- Conference: Independent
- Record: 7–0
- Head coach: John L. Marks (2nd season)
- Captain: Gus Dorais
- Home stadium: Cartier Field

1912 Midwestern college football independents records
	Conf.			Overall
Team	W	L	T	W		L		T
Notre Dame		–		7	–	0	–	0
Lincoln (MO)		–		1	–	0	–	0
Lake Forest		–		5	–	0	–	1
Michigan Agricultural		–		7	–	1	–	0
North Dakota Agricultural		–		5	–	1	–	0
South Dakota		–		5	–	1	–	0
Mount Union		–		9	–	2	–	0
Saint Louis		–		7	–	1	–	2
Michigan		–		5	–	2	–	0
Wabash		–		5	–	2	–	0
Buchtel		–		5	–	2	–	1
Detroit		–		5	–	2	–	1
Iowa State Teachers		–		5	–	2	–	1
St. Mary's (OH)		–		4	–	2	–	0
Michigan State Normal		–		4	–	2	–	1
Butler		–		5	–	3	–	0
Doane		–		5	–	3	–	0
Haskell		–		7	–	4	–	0
Central Michigan		–		2	–	1	–	2
Western State Normal		–		3	–	2	–	0
St. Viator		–		4	–	4	–	0
Fairmount		–		4	–	5	–	0
Marquette		–		3	–	4	–	0
Northern Illinois State		–		3	–	5	–	0
Baldwin–Wallace		–		0	–	1	–	0
Heidelberg		–		0	–	6	–	0

The 1912 Notre Dame Fighting Irish football team was an American football team that represented the University of Notre Dame as an independent during the 1912 college football season. In their second and final year under head coach John L. Marks, the Irish compiled a perfect 7–0 record and outscored opponents by a total of 389 to 27. It was Notre Dame's second consecutive undefeated season under Marks. The season began with one of the most lopsided victories in Notre Dame history – a 116–7 rout of Marks' former team, St. Viator. The season also included shutout victories over rivals Pittsburgh and Marquette.

Key players included quarterback and team captain Gus Dorais, ends Knute Rockne and Charles Crowley, fullback Ray Eichenlaub, and freshman guard Freeman Fitzgerald.

The team played its home games at Cartier Field in Notre Dame, Indiana.

== Schedule ==
Date	Opponent	Site	Result	Attendance	Source
October 5	St. Viator	Cartier Field; Notre Dame, IN	W 116–7		
October 12	Adrian	Cartier Field; Notre Dame, IN	W 74–7		
October 19	Morris Harvey	Cartier Field; Notre Dame, IN	W 39–0		
October 26	Wabash	Cartier Field; Notre Dame, IN	W 41–6		
November 2	at Pittsburgh	Forbes Field; Pittsburgh, PA (rivalry)	W 3–0		
November 9	at Saint Louis	St. Louis, MO	W 47–7		
November 28	vs. Marquette	Comiskey Park; Chicago, IL	W 69–0	7,000	

== Personnel ==
Gus Dorais

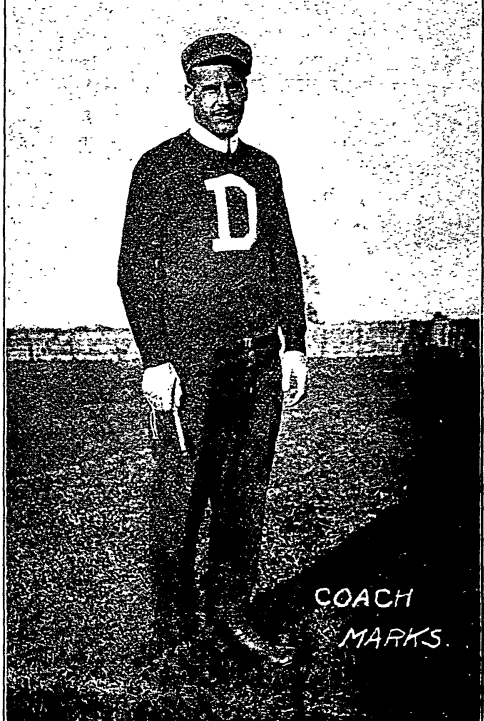
John L. Marks

=== Players ===
- Alvin Berger, halfback
- Charles Crowley, end
- William Dolan, end
- Gus Dorais, quarterback and captain
- Ray Eichenlaub, fullback
- Albert G. Feeney, center
- Charles T. Finnegan, quartrback
- Freeman Fitzgerald, guard
- Fred W. "Gus" Gushurst, halfback
- Edwin J. Harvat, tackle
- Keith K. Jones, tackle
- Arthur B. "Bunnie" Larkin, halfback
- Ralph G. Lathrop, guard
- Daniel V. McGinnis, end
- Joseph S. Pliska, halfback
- Knute Rockne, end
- Martin L. Stevenson, tackle
- Walter S. Yund, guard

=== Coaching staff ===
- Head coach - John L. Marks
- Assistant coaches - Dunbar and Philbrook
- Manager - William E. Cotter
- Assistant manager - John F. O'Connell
