= 1912 North Dakota Agricultural Aggies football team =

American college football season

1912 North Dakota Agricultural Aggies football
- Conference: Independent
- Record: 5–1
- Head coach: Arthur Rueber (4th season)
- Captain: Edgar Olson

1912 Midwestern college football independents records
	Conf.			Overall
Team	W	L	T	W		L		T
Notre Dame		–		7	–	0	–	0
Lincoln (MO)		–		1	–	0	–	0
Lake Forest		–		5	–	0	–	1
Michigan Agricultural		–		7	–	1	–	0
North Dakota Agricultural		–		5	–	1	–	0
South Dakota		–		5	–	1	–	0
Mount Union		–		9	–	2	–	0
Saint Louis		–		7	–	1	–	2
Michigan		–		5	–	2	–	0
Wabash		–		5	–	2	–	0
Buchtel		–		5	–	2	–	1
Detroit		–		5	–	2	–	1
Iowa State Teachers		–		5	–	2	–	1
St. Mary's (OH)		–		4	–	2	–	0
Michigan State Normal		–		4	–	2	–	1
Butler		–		5	–	3	–	0
Doane		–		5	–	3	–	0
Haskell		–		7	–	4	–	0
Central Michigan		–		2	–	1	–	2
Western State Normal		–		3	–	2	–	0
St. Viator		–		4	–	4	–	0
Fairmount		–		4	–	5	–	0
Marquette		–		3	–	4	–	0
Northern Illinois State		–		3	–	5	–	0
Baldwin–Wallace		–		0	–	1	–	0
Heidelberg		–		0	–	6	–	0

The 1912 North Dakota Agricultural Aggies football team was an American football team that represented North Dakota Agricultural College (now known as North Dakota State University) as an independent during the 1912 college football season. In its fourth season under head coach Arthur Rueber, the team compiled a 5–1 record and outscored opponents by a total of 200 to 6.

== Schedule ==
Date	Opponent	Site	Result	Source
	Wahpeton	Dacotah Field; Fargo, ND	W 21–0	
October 5	Wahpeton Indian School	Dacotah Field; Fargo, ND	W 123–0	
October 19	Dakota Wesleyan	Dacotah Field; Fargo, ND	W 35–0	
October 26	St. Cloud Normal	Dacotah Field; Fargo, ND	W 7–0	
November 1	Fargo	Dacotah Field; Fargo, ND	W 14–3	
November 6	at North Dakota	Grand Forks, ND (rivalry)	L 0–3	
