= Frank Dennie =

American football player, coach, and administrator (1885–1952)

Biographical details
- Born: March 30, 1885; Concord, Massachusetts, U.S.
- Died: January 13, 1952 (aged 66); Rolla, Missouri, U.S.

Playing career
- 1905–1908: Brown
- Positions: End, quarterback

Coaching career (HC unless noted)
- 1909–1911: Missouri Mines
- 1912–1913: Saint Louis
- 1915–1917: Missouri Mines

Head coaching record
- Overall: 26–31–4

Accomplishments and honors

Awards
- Second-team All-American (1908)

Frank Edward Dennie (March 30, 1885 – January 13, 1952), also known as Fred Dennie, was an American college football player and coach, athletics administrator, and mathematics professor. He played college football at Brown University from 1905 to 1908 and was selected as an end on the 1908 College Football All-America Team. He also played at quarterback for Brown. Dennie served two stints the head football coach at the Missouri School of Mines and Metallurgy—now known as the Missouri University of Science and Technology—in Rolla, Missouri, from 1909 to 1911 and from 1915 to 1917, and one stint at Saint Louis University, from 1912 to 1913.

Dennie was on March 30, 1885, in Concord, Massachusetts. He attended public schools in Brockton, Massachusetts, and Williston Seminary—now known as Williston Northampton School—in Easthampton, Massachusetts. Dennie served as the athletic director as Missouri Mines until 1928, when he was appointed assistant professor of mathematics at the school. He died on January 13, 1952, in Rolla.

== Head coaching record ==
| Year | Team | Overall | Conference | Standing | Bowl/playoffs |
|---|---|---|---|---|---|
Missouri Mines Miners (Independent) (1909–1911)
| 1909 | Missouri Mines | 5–4 | | | |
| 1910 | Missouri Mines | 3–3–1 | | | |
| 1911 | Missouri Mines | 1–5–2 | | | |
Saint Louis Billikens (Independent) (1912–1914)
| 1912 | Saint Louis | 7–2 | | | |
| 1913 | Saint Louis | 2–5 | | | |
| Saint Louis: | | 9–7 | | | |
Missouri Mines Miners (Independent) (1915–1917)
| 1915 | Missouri Mines | 5–2 | | | |
| 1916 | Missouri Mines | 1–6–1 | | | |
| 1917 | Missouri Mines | 2–4 | | | |
| Missouri Mines: | | 17–24–4 | | | |
| Total: | | 26–31–4 | | | |
