= 1912 Wabash Little Giants football team =

American college football season

1912 Wabash Little Giants football
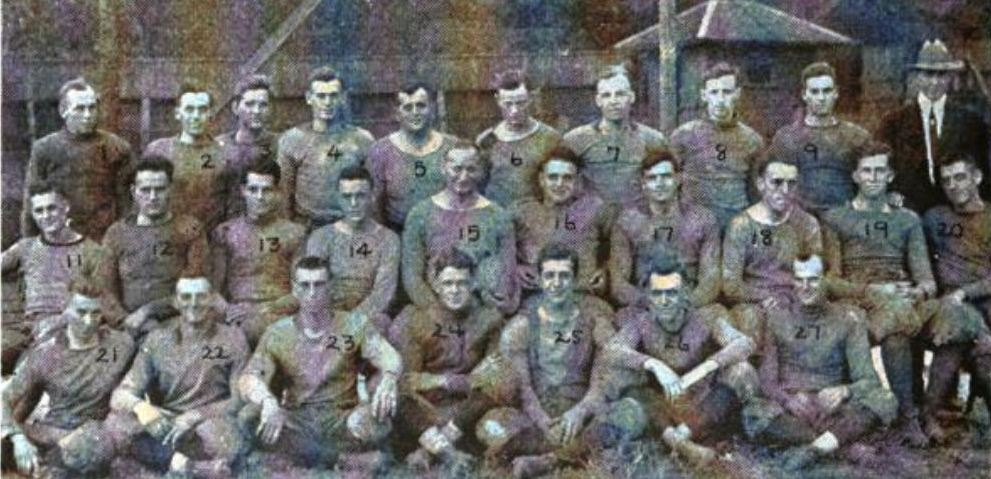
- Conference: Independent
- Record: 5–2
- Head coach: Jesse Harper (4th season)

1912 Midwestern college football independents records
	Conf.			Overall
Team	W	L	T	W		L		T
Notre Dame		–		7	–	0	–	0
Lincoln (MO)		–		1	–	0	–	0
Lake Forest		–		5	–	0	–	1
Michigan Agricultural		–		7	–	1	–	0
North Dakota Agricultural		–		5	–	1	–	0
South Dakota		–		5	–	1	–	0
Mount Union		–		9	–	2	–	0
Saint Louis		–		7	–	1	–	2
Michigan		–		5	–	2	–	0
Wabash		–		5	–	2	–	0
Buchtel		–		5	–	2	–	1
Detroit		–		5	–	2	–	1
Iowa State Teachers		–		5	–	2	–	1
St. Mary's (OH)		–		4	–	2	–	0
Michigan State Normal		–		4	–	2	–	1
Butler		–		5	–	3	–	0
Doane		–		5	–	3	–	0
Haskell		–		7	–	4	–	0
Central Michigan		–		2	–	1	–	2
Western State Normal		–		3	–	2	–	0
St. Viator		–		4	–	4	–	0
Fairmount		–		4	–	5	–	0
Marquette		–		3	–	4	–	0
Northern Illinois State		–		3	–	5	–	0
Baldwin–Wallace		–		0	–	1	–	0
Heidelberg		–		0	–	6	–	0

The 1912 Wabash Little Giants football team represented Wabash College as an independent during the 1912 college football season. Led by fourth-year head coach Jesse Harper, the Little Giants compiled a record of 5–2 record, and outscored their opponents 261 to 65.

== Schedule ==
Date	Opponent	Site	Result	Source
October 4	Evansville	Crawfordsville, IN	W 101–0	
October 12	DePauw	Greencastle, IN	W 62–0	
October 19	Butler	Crawfordsville, IN	W 46–0	
October 26	Notre Dame	Cartier Field; Notre Dame, IN	L 6–41	
November 2	Rose Polytechnic	Crawfordsville, IN	W 39–0	
November 9	Earlham	Crawfordsville, IN	W 7–0	
November 16	Michigan Agricultural	College Field; East Lansing, MI	L 0–24	
