= 1912 Detroit Tigers football team =

American college football season

1912 Detroit Tigers football
- Conference: Independent
- Record: 5–2–1
- Head coach: Royal R. Campbell (2nd season)
- Home stadium: Mack Park

1912 Midwestern college football independents records
	Conf.			Overall
Team	W	L	T	W		L		T
Notre Dame		–		7	–	0	–	0
Lincoln (MO)		–		1	–	0	–	0
Lake Forest		–		5	–	0	–	1
Michigan Agricultural		–		7	–	1	–	0
North Dakota Agricultural		–		5	–	1	–	0
South Dakota		–		5	–	1	–	0
Mount Union		–		9	–	2	–	0
Saint Louis		–		7	–	1	–	2
Michigan		–		5	–	2	–	0
Wabash		–		5	–	2	–	0
Buchtel		–		5	–	2	–	1
Detroit		–		5	–	2	–	1
Iowa State Teachers		–		5	–	2	–	1
St. Mary's (OH)		–		4	–	2	–	0
Michigan State Normal		–		4	–	2	–	1
Butler		–		5	–	3	–	0
Doane		–		5	–	3	–	0
Haskell		–		7	–	4	–	0
Central Michigan		–		2	–	1	–	2
Western State Normal		–		3	–	2	–	0
St. Viator		–		4	–	4	–	0
Fairmount		–		4	–	5	–	0
Marquette		–		3	–	4	–	0
Northern Illinois State		–		3	–	5	–	0
Baldwin–Wallace		–		0	–	1	–	0
Heidelberg		–		0	–	6	–	0

The 1912 Detroit Tigers football team was an American football team that represented the University of Detroit in the 1912 college football season. In its second season under head coach Royal R. Campbell, the team compiled a 5–2–1 record and outscored its opponents by a combined total of 242 to 104.

== Schedule ==
Date	Opponent	Site	Result	Source
September 28	at Assumption (ON)	Sandwich, ON	W 31–0	
October 5	at Heidelberg	Tiffin, OH	W 19–12	
October 12	at Hillsdale	Martin field; Hillsdale, MI	T 13–13	
October 26	at Michigan freshmen	Ann Arbor, MI	W 19–16	
November 4	at Olivet	Olivet MI	L 21–29	
November 9	Cleary (Note: Clearly replaced Western State Normal on the schedule after the Hilltoppers withdrew their agreement to participate.)	Mack Park; Detroit, MI	W 91–0	
November 17	Alma	Detroit, MI	L 20–28	
November 28	Loyola (IL)	Detroit, MI	W 27–6	
