= 1912 Marquette Blue and Gold football team =

American college football season

1912 Marquette Blue and Gold football
- Conference: Independent
- Record: 3–4
- Head coach: Clarence Kenney (1st season)

1912 Midwestern college football independents records
	Conf.			Overall
Team	W	L	T	W		L		T
Notre Dame		–		7	–	0	–	0
Lincoln (MO)		–		1	–	0	–	0
Lake Forest		–		5	–	0	–	1
Michigan Agricultural		–		7	–	1	–	0
North Dakota Agricultural		–		5	–	1	–	0
South Dakota		–		5	–	1	–	0
Mount Union		–		9	–	2	–	0
Saint Louis		–		7	–	1	–	2
Michigan		–		5	–	2	–	0
Wabash		–		5	–	2	–	0
Buchtel		–		5	–	2	–	1
Detroit		–		5	–	2	–	1
Iowa State Teachers		–		5	–	2	–	1
St. Mary's (OH)		–		4	–	2	–	0
Michigan State Normal		–		4	–	2	–	1
Butler		–		5	–	3	–	0
Doane		–		5	–	3	–	0
Haskell		–		7	–	4	–	0
Central Michigan		–		2	–	1	–	2
Western State Normal		–		3	–	2	–	0
St. Viator		–		4	–	4	–	0
Fairmount		–		4	–	5	–	0
Marquette		–		3	–	4	–	0
Northern Illinois State		–		3	–	5	–	0
Baldwin–Wallace		–		0	–	1	–	0
Heidelberg		–		0	–	6	–	0

The 1912 Marquette Blue and Gold football team represented the Marquette University as an independent during the 1912 college football season. Led by Clarence Kenney in his first and only season as head coach, Marquette compiled a record of 3–4.

== Schedule ==
Date	Opponent	Site	Result	Attendance	Source
October 5	Carroll (WI)	Milwaukee, WI	W 6–0		
October 12	at DePaul	Chicago, IL	W 20–0		
October 19	at Creighton	Omaha, NE	L 0–20		
October 25	Lawrence	Milwaukee, WI	L 0–12		
November 2	at Loyola (IL)	Chicago, IL	W 41–0		
November 16	at Saint Louis	St. Louis, MO	L 6–20		
November 28	vs. Notre Dame	Comiskey Park; Chicago, IL	L 0–69	7,000	
