= Miller Pontius =

American football player and coach (1891–1960)

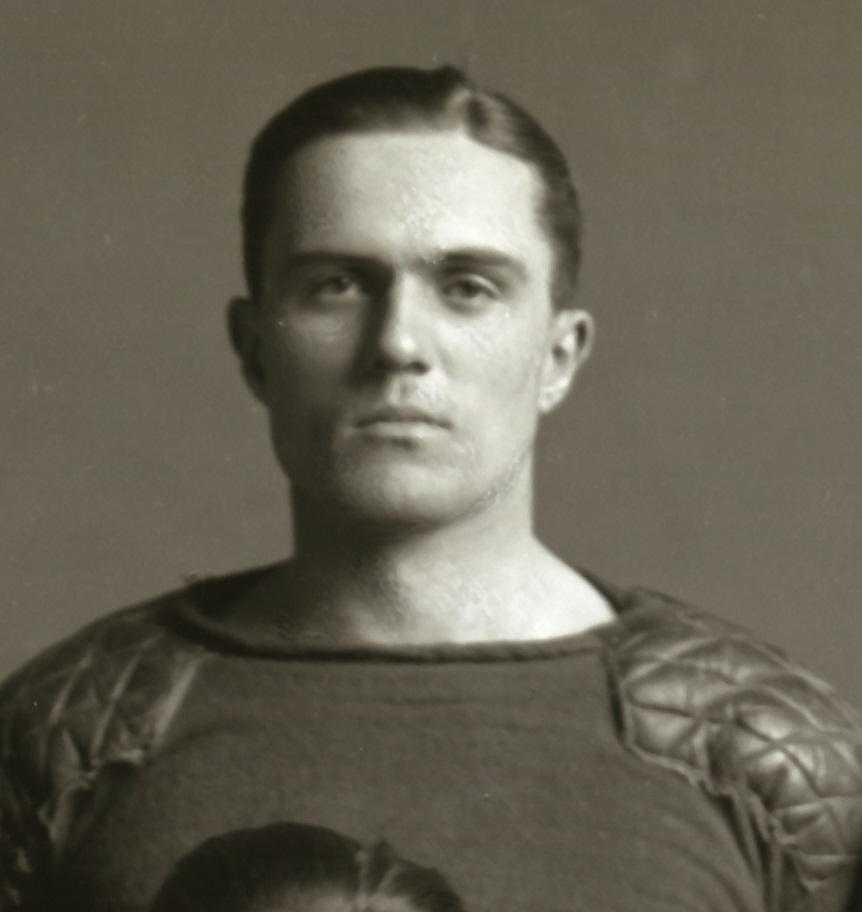
- Pontius cropped from 1912 Michigan football team photograph

Biographical details
- Born: April 17, 1891; Circleville, Ohio, U.S.
- Died: November 5, 1960 (aged 69); New York City, New York, U.S.
- Education: University of Michigan

Playing career

Football
- 1911–1913: Michigan

Baseball
- 1913: Michigan
- Positions: End, tackle (football); First baseman (baseball)

Coaching career (HC unless noted)

Football
- 1914–1915: Tennessee (assistant)
- 1916: Michigan (assistant)

Accomplishments and honors

Awards
- Consensus All-American (1913); Consensus first-team All-Western (1912)

Miller Hall Pontius (April 17, 1891 – November 5, 1960) was an American football player and investment banker.

A native of Circleville, Ohio, Pontius played college football as a tackle and end for coach Fielding H. Yost's Michigan Wolverines from 1911 to 1913. He was selected as a consensus first-team tackle on the 1913 College Football All-America Team. He also played baseball at Michigan under head coach Branch Rickey.

Pontius later served as an assistant football coach the University of Tennessee from 1914 to 1915 and at Michigan in 1916. He served in the United States Army during World War I. In later years, he was an investment banker with F. Eberstadt and Co. from 1938 until his death in 1960.

== Early years ==
Pontius was born in Circleville, Ohio, 1891. He was the son of Judge George Pontius and Ora Pontius. He attended Everts High School in Circleville where he played for the football, basketball and baseball teams and was captain of the football team in 1907. He graduated in 1908. He next attended preparatory school at the Detroit University School where he starred at the fullback position on the football team. After Detroit University School. Pontius attended Kenyon College for one year.

== University of Michigan ==
In 1910, Pontius enrolled at the University of Michigan. While attending Michigan, Pontius was a member of Alpha Delta Phi, Barristers, Michigammua, and The Friars. He became known as an outstanding athlete at Michigan, playing for the football and baseball teams and also developing a reputation as an excellent boxer.

=== Football ===
He played at the fullback position for the freshman football team in 1910. As a sophomore, he weighed approximately 200 pounds and played at the end and tackle positions for the 1911 team. Years later, Pontius was remembered as a "slashing tackle."

==== 1912 season ====
Pontius was stricken by typhoid fever during the summer of 1912. After a period of convalescing at his home in Ohio, Pontius was sent "west to the mountains for his health." When he arrived in Ann Arbor in September, he was "not in condition to stand the grueling work of a football season." After a promising showing by Pontius in 1911, his loss reportedly cost coach Yost "much worry and sleep."

Despite the illness, Pontius managed to get into shape and played several games in 1912. In November 1912, Yost announced that he was moving Pontius from right end to right tackle. One reporter noted that Pontius was "a medium end," but "a crackerjack tackle." At the end of the 1912 season, Pontius received first team All-Western honors from Chicago football writer George W. Axelson, E. C. Patterson for Collier's Weekly Fielding H. Yost in the Detroit Free Press, and Walter Eckersall for the Chicago Tribune. Pontius was nominated to be captain of the 1913 team, but lost the vote to George C. Paterson.

==== 1913 season ====
Before the 1913 season, Pontius was expected to be a star. He helped lead the 1913 Wolverines to a 6–1, outscoring opponents, 175 to 21. The only loss was to Michigan Agricultural College (later known as Michigan State), 12–7. They beat Vanderbilt, 33–2, Syracuse, 43–7, Cornell, 17–0, and Penn, 13–0.

Pontius played his last game as a Wolverine on November 15, 1913, against Penn. Collier's Weekly wrote the following of his performance in that game: "He was aggressive against Pennsylvania, playing both end and tackle. He showed a thorough knowledge of the game and always crashed into the point of rival attacks."

At the end of the 1913 season, Pontius was a consensus first-team tackle on the 1913 College Football All-America Team, receiving first-team honors from, among others, Grantland Rice, Frank G. Menke, Tom Thorp, and Fielding H.Yost.

=== Baseball ===
Pontius was also a standout baseball player at Michigan, where he played for coach Branch Rickey and alongside George Sisler—both of whom were later inducted into the Baseball Hall of Fame. In 1913, he was the first baseman for Rickey's best team at Michigan, a squad that went 21–4–1. It was the first Michigan baseball team to win 20 games.

At the end of the 1913 baseball season, Pontius was elected to serve as captain of the 1914 Michigan baseball team. However, in February 1914, Pontius announced that he would not play baseball that spring "as a result of scholastic difficulties." George Sisler was chosen to succeed Pontius as the team's captain.

== Coaching career and military service ==
In June 1914, Pontius graduated from the law department at Michigan. He was admitted to practice law in both Michigan and Ohio. Upon graduating, he became an assistant football coach under Zora Clevenger at the University of Tennessee. He introduced the "Yost-Michigan system" at Tennessee, and the 1915 Tennessee Volunteers football team responded with a perfect 9-0 record and the program's first Southern championship.

Pontius returned to Tennessee in 1915, but he decided in January 1916 not to return to Tennessee "because of private business interests."

In March 1916, Pontius was hired as an assistant coach responsible for the lineman on the 1916 Michigan football team. He took charge of spring practice in May 1916. In October 1916, the Syracuse Herald noted that "the line coaching of Miller Pontius has helped remarkably in bolstering up their department, and the back field can bank on much better protection." The Michigan Daily also praised Pontius' work in strengthening the line:

Perhaps no single individual deserves any more credit for the showing of the 1916 Michigan Varsity than Line Coach Miller H. Pontius. . . . The former Varsity star took hold with a vengeance . . . and built up a forward wall that was a wonderful improvement upon that of the previous season. . . . Pontius was a star of the first magnitude himself during his college career and he seems to have the gift for imparting to others the knowledge that he learned while actively engaged in mussing up the scenery . . ."

Pontius signed a contract in January 1917 to return to Michigan's coaching staff. However, following the United States entry into World War I, he enlisted in the United States Army in August 1917. He served as a second lieutenant in a field artillery unit.

== Business career ==
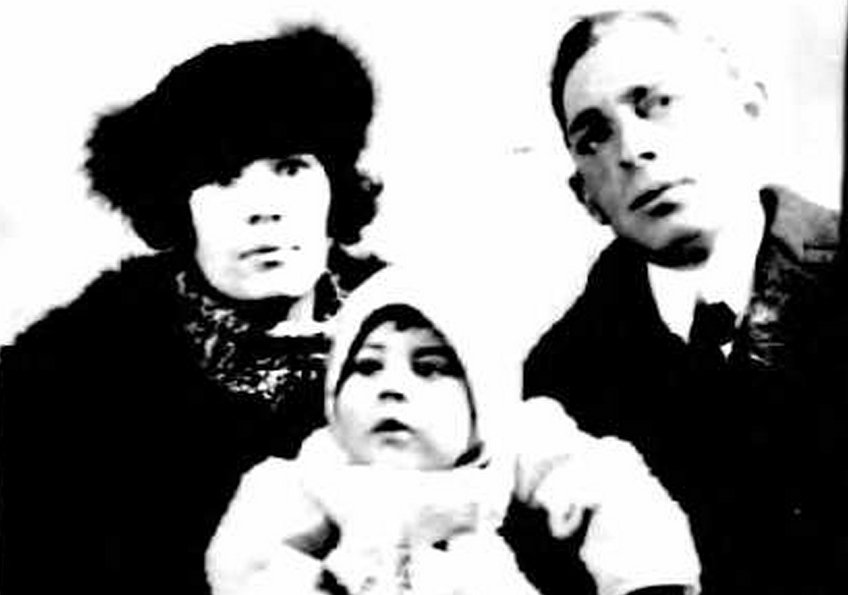
Pontius with wife Mildred and son David (1922)

In 1919, after being discharged from the Army, Pontius sailed to Rio de Janeiro, Brazil. He spent three years in South America working for the foreign department of the National City Bank.

In 1922, Pontius was working with the foreign department of the Home Insurance Company. He then went into the security business in Chicago in 1925. In 1934, he moved to New York City and was for four years the president of the New York Michigan Club. In 1937, he was a vice president of G.L. Ohrstrom & Co., Inc., an investment banking, brokerage and real estate development firm founded by fellow University of Michigan alumnus, George L. Ohrstrom.

In 1938, Pontius was elected vice president of the Touchdown Club in New York City. Also, in 1938, Pontius was the "toastmaster" at a Michigan Alumni Club dinner in New York in honor of Michigan's new football coach Fritz Crisler. Pontius spoke of "the return of Michigan to its former high estate in the game."

Pontius next joined the Wall Street investment banking firm, F. Eberstadt and Co. He began as its Chicago partner in 1938. He moved to the New York City office in 1943 as syndicate manager and senior vice president. He remained with Eberstadt until his death in 1960.

== Family and later years ==
In 1922, Pontius married Mildred Carrington Taylor of Port Huron, Michigan, in a ceremony at Watertown, New York. Their son, David Taylor Pontius (1924-1992), attended the University of Michigan in the 1940s. Pontius and his wife resided in later years in Bronxville, New York.

In 1957, Pontius received a distinguished alumni service medal from the University of Michigan.

Pontius died in 1960 at Presbyterian Hospital in Manhattan at age 69.

In April 1972, the Miller Hall Pontius Room was dedicated at the Pickaway County Historical Society's Clarke-May Museum in Pontius' hometown of Circleville, Ohio. His widow, son, and grandson (Miller Hall Pontius II) attended the dedication ceremony.

== See also ==
- List of Michigan Wolverines football All-Americans
