= Gus Dorais =

American football player, coach, and administrator (1891–1954)

- Dorais, c. 1913

Biographical details
- Born: July 2, 1891; Chippewa Falls, Wisconsin, U.S.
- Died: January 3, 1954 (aged 62); Southfield, Michigan, U.S.

Playing career

Football
- 1910–1913: Notre Dame
- 1915: Massillon Tigers
- 1916: Fort Wayne Friars
- 1918–1919: Massillon Tigers
- Position: Quarterback

Coaching career (HC unless noted)

Football
- 1914–1917: Dubuque
- 1919: Notre Dame (assistant)
- 1920–1924: Gonzaga
- 1925–1942: Detroit
- 1943–1947: Detroit Lions
- 1952: Pittsburgh Steelers (backfield)

Basketball
- 1914–1918: Dubuque
- 1918–1920: Notre Dame
- 1920–1925: Gonzaga
- 1925–1929: Detroit

Baseball
- 1919–1920: Notre Dame
- 1921–1925: Gonzaga

Administrative career (AD unless noted)
- 1920–1925: Gonzaga

Head coaching record
- Overall: 151–70–12 (college football); 20–31–2 (NFL); 93–113 (college basketball); 41–31–1 (college baseball)
- Bowls: 0–1

Accomplishments and honors

Championships
- Football; 1 Co-National Champion (Davis) (1928); 1 Northwest Conference (1924)

Awards
- Consensus All-American (1913); First-team All-Western (1913)
- College Football Hall of Fame; Inducted in 1954 (profile)

Charles Emile "Gus" Dorais (July 2, 1891 – January 3, 1954) was an American football player, coach, and athletics administrator.

Dorais played college football at the University of Notre Dame, where he was an All-American in 1913 at quarterback, and then played professionally with the Fort Wayne Friars and Massillon Tigers. He was the head football coach at Dubuque College (now known as Loras College) in Dubuque, Iowa from 1914 to 1917, Gonzaga University in Spokane, Washington from 1920 to 1925, and the University of Detroit (now known as the University of Detroit Mercy) from 1925 to 1942, compiling a career college football head coaching record of 151–70–12 (.674). He was also the head coach of the National Football League (NFL)'s Detroit Lions from 1943 to 1947, tallying a mark of 20–31–2 (.396). In addition, Dorais was the head basketball coach at Notre Dame, Gonzaga, and Detroit and the head baseball coach at Notre Dame and Gonzaga. He was inducted into the College Football Hall of Fame as a coach in 1954.

== Early years ==
Dorais was born in Chippewa Falls, Wisconsin, in 1891. He was the son of David Dorais, a native of Quebec, and Malvina (Murphy) Dorais, a Wisconsin native sometimes referred to as Mary. When Dorais was a child, his parents separated. According to one account, the father abandoned the family. According to another, the mother left the father. Dorais remained with his mother, who took in laundry, worked as a midwife, and did odd jobs to support her children. Dorais' father moved to Montana where he worked in the mines and died of acute alcoholism in a Butte boarding house in November 1911 (one month before his son was elected captain of the Notre Dame football team).

Dorais attended Chippewa Falls High School and was captain of the school's 1909 football team that won the state championship.

== Football player ==
=== Notre Dame ===
Dorais enrolled at the University of Notre Dame in the summer of 1910 at 5 ft 7 in (1.70 m) and 145 lb (66 kg). As a freshman, he was the quarterback on the Fighting Irish second team and became "the star performer, dodging in a way that showed up many of the first team men."

As a sophomore, Dorais was the starting quarterback on the 1911 Notre Dame football team that compiled a 6–0–2 record. He was rated as "the star" of the 1911 team, winning praise for his tackling on defense. At the team banquet following the 1911 season, Dorais was elected by his teammates as the captain of the 1912 team.

As captain and starting quarterback, Dorais led the 1912 team to a 7–0 record, the first perfect season in Notre Dame history. The team outscored opponents, 389 to 27, including a 116–7 victory over St. Viator College and a 69–0 victory over Marquette. At the end of the 1912 season, The Notre Dame Scholastic wrote: "Captain Dorais is the type of young man Notre Dame feels proud of. He is a great player,—resourceful, vigilant, always calm,—and what is vastly more important, he is a fine type of gentleman. Much of the 'helping' spirit among the players was the result of his ever present tact."

During the summer before his senior season, Dorais and his teammate Knute Rockne worked as lifeguards and busboys at Cedar Point Resort on Lake Erie in Sandusky, Ohio. During their free time there, they practiced passing on the beach with Dorais throwing to Rockne, an end. Rockne later wrote, "We mastered the technique of losing the football with hands relaxed and tried to master the more difficult feat of catching it with one hand," Rockne later wrote. From that point forward, no longer was the forward pass an obscure weapon, or a little-used gimmick to be used when trailing late in games. "The press and the football public hailed this new game, and Notre Dame received credit as the originator of a style of play that we simply systematized," Rockne said.

Dorais and Rockne, along with fullback Ray Eichenlaub, led the 1913 Notre Dame team to a 7–0, the team's third consecutive undefeated season with Dorais at quarterback. The 1913 outscored opponents by a margin of 268 to 41. Dorais shone for Notre Dame in multiple roles in 1913, as a dual threat quarterback on offense and as a defender, punter, placekicker, and punt returner. The Chicago Examiner wrote: "Dorais is a great general, a sure catcher of punts, a fast and elusive runner, a great punter and a field goal kicker." His greatest acclaim came for his passing performance (14 of 17 for 243 yards and three touchdowns) in a 35–13 victory over undefeated Army at West Point, New York on November 1. Dorais' performance against Army has been credited with popularizing the modern passing game.

At the end of the season, Dorais was selected as a first-team All-American by Frank G. Menke of the International News Service, the Milwaukee Free Press, Tom Thorp, and the Trenton Evening-Times. He was the first consensus All-American in Notre Dame history.

Vanity Fair in 1913 praised Dorais' versatility: "Dorais is not only a sure catcher of punts, but he is also a master of the forward pass, a sure tackler, a good punter, an open-field runner with few equals, and altogether able to meet any emergencies of his position." Notre Dame's "Dome" yearbook for 1914 declared Dorais to be "the 'Little Napoleon' of our great football teams" and Notre Dame's "greatest all time football player."

=== Professional football ===
Dorais later played professional football for the Massillon Tigers (1915, 1918–1919) and Fort Wayne Friars (1916). Despite weighing only 138 pounds, he was one of the early stars of professional football in the years before the formation of the National Football League. In 1915, Dorais and Rockne played for Massillon in a season highlighted by two games with Jim Thorpe's Canton Bulldogs. In the first game, a 16–0 victory for Massillon, Dorais completed 7 of 19 passes for 119 yards and kicked three field goals. Canton won the rematch on November 28, 1915, billed as the championship of the Ohio League, when an apparent touchdown pass from Dorais to Briggs was disallowed after a lengthy post-game conference among officials. In 1916, Dorais was the star of the Fort Wayne Friars.

== Coaching career ==
=== Dubuque ===
In June 1914, Dorais was hired by Dubuque College (later renamed Loras College), a Catholic college in Dubuque, Iowa. He served as the school's football, basketball, and track coach, athletic director, teacher, and chairman of commercial law. He remained at Dubuque for approximately four years. He compiled a 17–9–2 record as Dubuque's head football coach from 1914 to 1917, including an undefeated 1916 season. His basketball teams won Hawkeye Conference championships all three seasons he was in charge.

In December 1917, Dorais was inducted into the Army during World War I. He was assigned to the officer training corps at Camp Dodge in central Iowa.

=== Notre Dame ===
In September 1919, Knute Rockne hired Dorais as his assistant at Notre Dame. Together, they led the 1919 Notre Dame football team to a perfect 9–0 record. Dorais also served as the head coach of Notre Dame's basketball and baseball teams during the 1918–19 and 1919–20 academic year.

=== Gonzaga ===
In May 1920, Dorais was hired as the athletic director at Gonzaga University, a Jesuit school located in Spokane, Washington. He also served as the head coach of the Gonzaga football, basketball, baseball, and track teams for the next five years.

Dorais earned $4,000 per year at Gonzaga and was kept for a fifth season in 1924 when boosters helped raise his salary to $7,000 to prevent him from leaving for Detroit. The Bulldogs were undefeated in 1924, led on the field by Houston Stockton, grandfather of basketball hall of famer John Stockton.

=== University of Detroit ===
Gus Dorais, circa 1940

In February 1925, Dorais reached an agreement with the University of Detroit, giving him complete control of the school's athletic program as both athletic director and coach of various teams, including the football team.

Dorais remained the University of Detroit's athletic director and head football coach for 18 seasons from 1925 to 1942. His record with the Detroit Titans football was 113–48–7 (.693). Dorais was also the head coach of the basketball team for his first four years at the school from 1925 to 1929.

Dorais led the Titans to the top tier of college football programs, scheduling games against Army, Notre Dame, Michigan State, Oklahoma A&M, and Arkansas, as well as regular series with other major Catholic colleges and universities, including Fordham, Boston College, DePaul, Georgetown, Marquette, Villanova, Duquesne, Manhattan College, and Catholic University. From October 1927 to November 1929, his teams did not lose a game, an unbeaten streak that lasted 22 games and included a perfect 9–0 record during the 1928 season in which the Titans were named co-national champions by Parke H. Davis. He recruited and coached elite athletes to the school, including Lloyd Brazil (All-American halfback in 1928 and 1929 and NCAA passing leader in 1928), fullback Andy Farkas (a two-time All-Pro fullback with the Redskins), halfback Doug Nott (NCAA passing leader in 1933), Al Ghesquiere (NCAA rushing leader in 1940), and Vince Banonis (All-American center in 1940, later inducted into the College Football Hall of Fame).

Dorais was the college team coach for the fourth College All-Star Game in 1937 in Chicago, in which college seniors from the previous season (pro rookies) played against the defending NFL champions in a pre-season game on September 1. With Sammy Baugh at quarterback and over 84,500 in attendance on a Wednesday night at Soldier Field, the college stars won 6–0 over Curly Lambeau's Green Bay Packers. This was the first All-Star team to beat the pros.

=== Detroit Lions ===
In January 1943, Dorais left the University of Detroit at age 51 to become the head coach, general manager, and part owner of the Detroit Lions of the National Football League (NFL). Prior to Dorais' arrival, the Lions had compiled a 0–11 record in 1942. In their first year under Dorais, the 1943 Lions improved modestly to 3–6–1.

In 1944 and 1945, Dorais turned the Lions around, leading them to second-place finishes both years with records of 6–3–1 and 7–3. During his time with the Lions, Dorais was credited with having "the best pass patterns in the NFL." After two strong seasons, the Lions slipped to 1–10 in 1946 and 3–9 in 1947. One week after the end of the 1947 season, Lions owner Fred L. Mandel Jr. announced that, despite the five-year contract signed with Dorais prior to the 1947 season, Dorais had been removed as the club's head coach. The parties reached a settlement which included a payoff for the final four years of Dorais' contract.

== Legacy and honors ==
Although the forward pass was legalized four years before Dorais enrolled at Notre Dame, his overhand spiral throwing technique and successful passing game were considered "revolutionary" and led to Dorais being called the "father of the forward pass". Dorais found the title flattering, but said he felt the honor was misplaced and should instead be applied to Eddie Cochems who used the forward pass extensively as head coach of the Saint Louis Billikens in 1906.

Dorais received numerous posthumous honors for his contributions to the sport. His honors include the following:

- In 1954, seven months after his death, Dorais was named to the National Football Foundation's College Football Hall of Fame.
- In 1955, the Wisconsin native was inducted into the Wisconsin Athletic Hall of Fame.
- In 1958, having spent 23 years as head coach of the Detroit Titans and Lions, he was inducted into the Michigan Sports Hall of Fame.
- In 1960, he was inducted as a coach into the Helms Athletic Foundation Hall of Fame.
- In 1976, the football field at his alma mater, Chippewa Falls High School, was renamed in his honor.
- In 1983, he was inducted into the Loras College Athletics Hall of Fame as part of its inaugural class of inductees.
- In 1987, he was inducted into the Detroit Titans Hall of Fame.
- In 1988, he was inducted into the Gonzaga Athletic Hall of Fame as part of its inaugural class of inductees.

== Family, politics, and later years ==
In April 1918, Dorais married Viola Fettgather at a ceremony in Des Moines, Iowa. They had five children: Thomas (born c. 1921); William (born c. 1923); Dorothy Jean (Mulcrone, born c. 1925); Joan Mayree (Robinson, born c. 1928); and David (born c. 1934).

In 1939, Dorais became a candidate for the Detroit Common Council (as the city council was then known). He received the second highest vote count among all the candidates, served four terms, and was an advocate for the expansion of the city's recreation and play facilities. However, his job as head coach of the Detroit Lions resulted in frequent absences from meetings and criticism of his lack of attendance. He resigned from the Common Council in May 1947.

In July 1947, Dorais' youngest son, David, drowned while swimming in Tecon Lake while at the family's summer home in Otsego County, Michigan.

In 1949, Dorais moved to Wabash, Indiana, where he purchased an automobile dealership with his son, William. In September 1950, Dorais underwent exploratory surgery for cancer at the Mayo Clinic.

In June 1952, Dorais agreed to return to coaching as the backfield coach for the Pittsburgh Steelers. After one season with the Steelers, Dorais announced in January 1953 that he would likely retire.

He became ill with a circulatory disorder and moved to Southfield, Michigan, a suburb of Detroit, in 1953. In January 1954, he died at age 62 at his home at 19050 Middlesex Avenue in Southfield. The cause of his death was arteriosclerosis. Anorexia, with a duration of two years, was also listed on the death certificate as an antecedent cause; Dorais weighed only 67 pounds at the time of his death. His funeral was held at Gesu Church in Detroit, and he was interred at the Holy Sepulchre Cemetery in Southfield.

== Head coaching record ==
=== College football ===
Year	Team	Overall	Conference	Standing	Bowl/playoffs
Dubuque (Independent) (1914–1917)
1914	Dubuque				
1915	Dubuque				
1916	Dubuque				
1917	Dubuque				
Dubuque:		17–9–2			
Gonzaga Blue and White / Bulldogs (Independent) (1920–1923)
1920	Gonzaga	4–3			
1921	Gonzaga	3–4–1			
1922	Gonzaga	5–3			L San Diego East-West Christmas Classic
1923	Gonzaga	4–3			
Gonzaga Bulldogs (Northwest Conference) (1924)
1924	Gonzaga	5–0–2	3–0–2	T–1st	
Gonzaga:		21–13–3	3–0–2		
Detroit Titans (Independent) (1925–1942)
1925	Detroit	5–4			
1926	Detroit	3–6–1			
1927	Detroit	7–2			
1928	Detroit	9–0			
1929	Detroit	7–1–1			
1930	Detroit	5–3–2			
1931	Detroit	7–2–1			
1932	Detroit	8–2			
1933	Detroit	7–1			
1934	Detroit	5–3–1			
1935	Detroit	6–3			
1936	Detroit	7–3			
1937	Detroit	7–3			
1938	Detroit	6–4			
1939	Detroit	5–3–1			
1940	Detroit	7–2			
1941	Detroit	7–2			
1942	Detroit	5–4			
Detroit:		113–48–7			
Total:		151–70–12			
National championship Conference title Conference division title or championship game berth

=== Professional football ===
Team	Year	Regular season					Postseason			
Team	Year	Won	Lost	Ties	Win %	Finish	Won	Lost	Win %	Result
DET	1943	3	6	1	.350	3rd in NFL Western	–	–	–	–
DET	1944	6	3	1	.650	2nd in NFL Western	–	–	–	–
DET	1945	7	3	0	.700	2nd in NFL Western	–	–	–	–
DET	1946	1	10	0	.091	5th in NFL Western	–	–	–	–
DET	1947	3	9	0	.250	5th in NFL Western	–	–	–	–
DET Total		20	31	2	.396		–	–	–	–
NFL Total		20	31	2	.396		–	–	–	–
Total		20	31	2	.396		–	–	–	–
