= George C. Paterson =

American football player (1891–1945)

George "Bubbles" Paterson
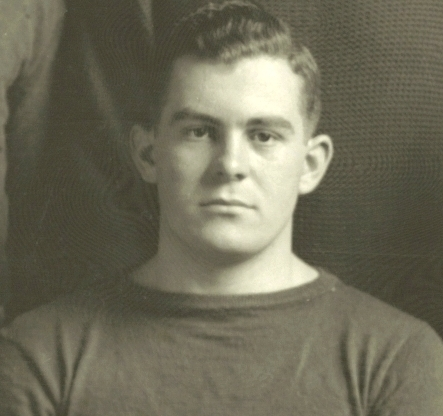

Michigan Wolverines
- Position: Center

Personal information
- Born: May 10, 1891; Austin, Pennsylvania, U.S.
- Died: November 29, 1945 (aged 54); Detroit, Michigan, U.S.

Career information
- College: Michigan (1911–1913)

Awards and highlights
- Third-team All-American (1913)

George Cornell "Bubbles" Paterson (May 10, 1891 – November 29, 1945) was an American football player and engineer. He played center for the University of Michigan Wolverines football teams coached by Fielding H. Yost from 1911 to 1913. He was selected as an All-American in 1913.

== Biography ==
=== Early life ===
Paterson was born in Austin, Pennsylvania in 1891. Paterson grew up in Detroit, Michigan, where his father, Andrew C. Paterson, practiced as an attorney. Paterson attended the Detroit public schools and graduated in 1910 from Detroit Central High School. At Detroit Central, Paterson was captain of the football team and a teammate of Jimmy Craig and Squib Torbet — both of whom later joined Paterson on the University of Michigan football team. Paterson also played with the Detroit Athletic Club team.

=== Football player at Michigan ===
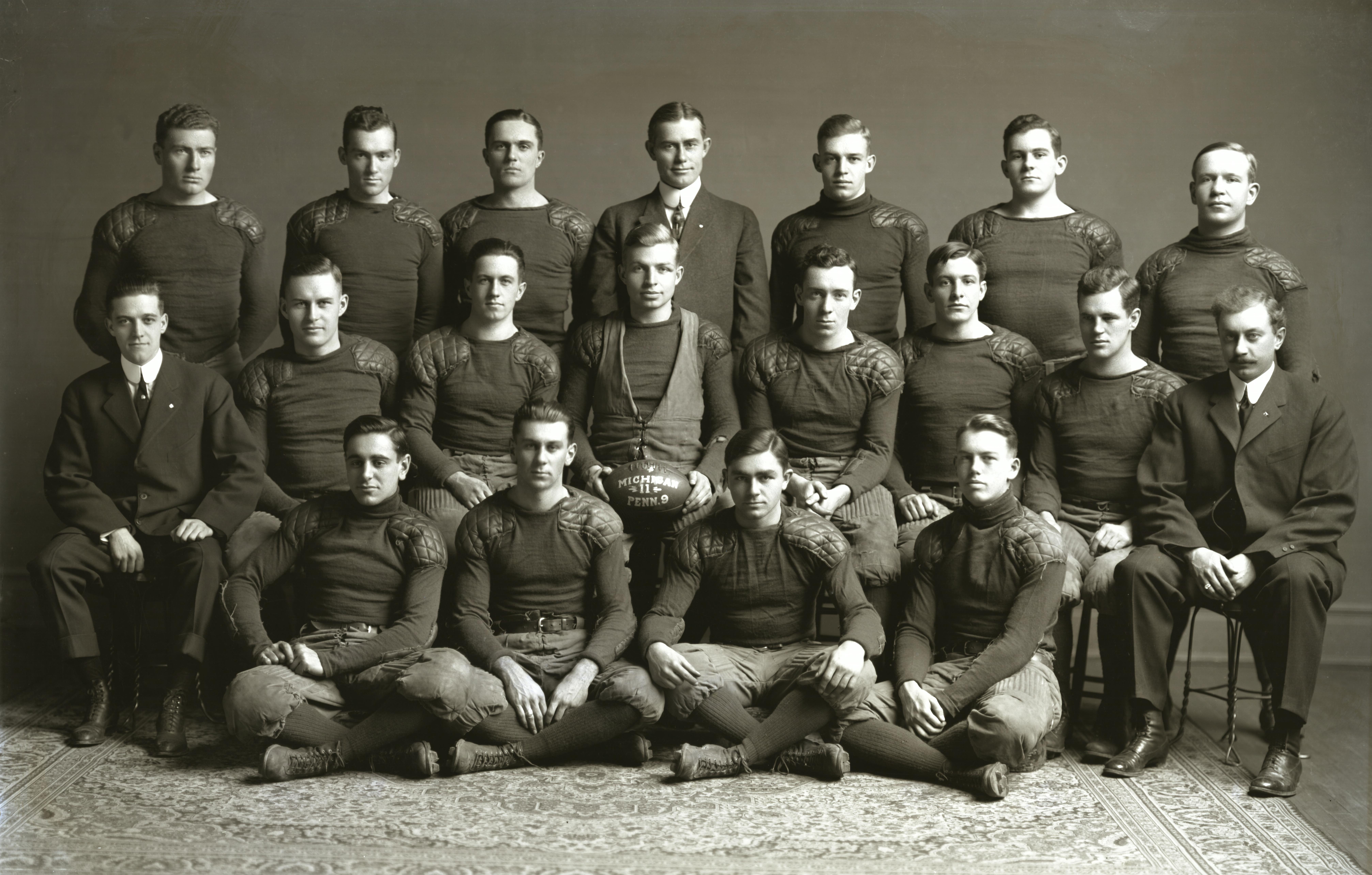
1911 Michigan Wolverines football team

Paterson enrolled at the University of Michigan where he played football under the school's famous coach, Fielding H. Yost. Paterson was the starting center on Yost's teams from 1911 to 1913. Paterson started all eight games for the Wolverines as a sophomore in 1911. In 1912, he started six of the team's seven games, missing one game due to injury. And as a senior in 1913, Paterson was elected by his teammates as the captain and started all seven games.

Michigan's 1913 football team, with Paterson as captain, finished with a 6–1 record and outscored its opponents 175–21. The team unexpectedly lost a game early in the season to Michigan Agricultural College (known now as the Michigan State University) by a score of 12–7. In the remaining six games, the team allowed only nine points. The 1913 schedule included games against three of the Eastern football powers, and the Wolverines won all three games — defeating Syracuse (43–7), Cornell (17–0) and Penn (13–0).

Paterson was the largest man on the Michigan football team. He stood six feet tall and weighed 210 pounds. He was known on the team and in the press as "Bubbles" Paterson.

Michigan's 1913 team was built around Paterson's large presence at center, as reflected in the following newspaper account:

Captain Paterson of this year's Michigan eleven, is one of the best centers in the country. It is around him that Coach Yost has built his present Wolverine eleven. Michigan plays three of the big eastern teams this year—Syracuse, Cornell and Pennsylvania. Yost expects his charges to have a good season, despite the unexpected defeat sustained at the hands of the Michigan Aggies. Captain Paterson shares the coach's confidence.

Michigan left the Big Ten Conference in the 1900s, and during the decade while Michigan was not affiliated with the Big Ten, its biggest rivalry was with Eastern football power, Penn. Michigan beat Penn in 1911, but lost the game in 1912. The 1913 Penn game was Paterson's last as a Wolverine, and he helped lead Michigan to a 13-0 shutout in the game. One published account summarized Paterson's contributions:

As the whistle at the close of the Michigan-Pennsylvania football game blew, every Michigan man felt justly proud of the captain of their victorious team, George Cornell Paterson. 'Bubb' had played his last game of intercollegiate football. For four years he had striven for that goal, realized by that final victory. The story of his college career is one of exceptional achievement ...

In December 1913, Baseball Magazine published profiles of the captains of the major college football teams. In its profile of Paterson, the magazine wrote:

George C. Patterson is the most important man at Ann Arbor. That is to say, he is captain of the football squad. There are people who would prefer to be president of the United States or a multimillionaire, but not so an undergraduate. He knows that to be leader of the varsity football club is to taste of the sweetest honors this old world has to offer. Patterson is six feet tall; furthermore, he is twenty-two years old. To sum up, he weighs 205 pounds. Why shouldn't he play center on any club, even the Wolverines?

At the end of the 1913 season, Paterson selected as a third-team All-American by Walter Camp for Collier's Weekly. He was also named as a first-team All-American by the Milwaukee Free Press.

At the close of his football career at Michigan, one publication summarized his contributions:

With such leadership the Michigan team was sure of success. 'Bubbles' worked hard, and his team was behind him to a man. Under the efficient coaching of Fielding H. Yost they were rounded into championship material. There was only one set-back, the loss of a game to the Michigan Agricultural College. Syracuse, Cornell and Pennsylvania all bowed in turn to the triumphant Michigan team with Paterson at its head. Michigan had certainly placed control of its team in good hands. He retires from the gridiron with a good, clean sportsman's record and the admiration of the campus. He owns three hard earned football 'M's.'

=== Academics and campus leader ===
Paterson was known as an outstanding scholar athlete and campus leader while at the University of Michigan. He was elected president of the university senior class as well as president of his fraternity, Theta Delta Chi. He was a member of the Vulcans, the senior engineering society and one of twenty senior elected to Michigauma, the highest honorary society at the university. One contemporary account noted his outstanding academic achievement:

Contrary to the general rule on such cases, he has not neglected his college work. He is in the mechanical engineering course, which is probably the hardest one offered at the university. Although athletic and campus activities have kept him away from his work very often he has never received one of the dreaded 'plucks.' His scholastic record is so good that last year he was elected to T B H, the honorary inter-collegiate engineering fraternity. Every college man realizes how high the standards are, which are necessary for election to T B H, and knows how infrequently athletes are found among its members.

=== Later life ===
Paterson graduated from the University of Michigan in 1914 with a degree in mechanical engineering. Upon graduating, Paterson worked for two years for the Saxon Motor Car Company in Detroit. Saxon's first car was a two-seat runabout. While Paterson was with the company in 1915, electric lighting was added as a standard fitting. In 1916, Paterson resigned his position at Saxon to become assistant manager of the Troy Body Company at Troy, Ohio. In 1919, he also became a director of the Troy Body Company. Paterson was a Republican, a Presbyterian, and a Mason.

In 1915, Paterson married Gretchen Schremser of Detroit. They had two daughters, Barbara and Virginia.

=== The George Cornell "Bubbles" Paterson Award ===
In 1947, the "George Cornell 'Bubbles' Paterson Award" was established. Between 1947 and 1966, the award was given to the leading athlete-scholar on the Michigan football team. In 1966, the name of the award was changed to the Dr. Arthur Robinson Scholarship Award, which continues to be given to the leading senior-scholar on the University of Michigan football team. Past recipients of the Paterson award include tackle Jim Orwig (1957) John Schopf in 1961. and quarterback Bob Timberlake in 1964.

== See also ==
- 1913 College Football All-America Team
