= 1912 West Virginia Mountaineers football team =

American college football season

1912 West Virginia Mountaineers football
- Conference: Independent
- Record: 6–3
- Head coach: William P. Edmunds (1st season)
- Captain: Carl G. Bachman

1912 Southern college football independents records
| | Conf. | | | Overall |
| Team | W | L | T | W | | L | | T |
|---|---|---|---|---|---|---|---|---|
| Middle Tennessee State Normal | | – | | 1 | – | 0 | – | 0 |
| Texas | | – | | 7 | – | 1 | – | 0 |
| VMI | | – | | 7 | – | 1 | – | 0 |
| Maryland | | – | | 6 | – | 1 | – | 1 |
| Oklahoma A&M | | – | | 5 | – | 2 | – | 0 |
| Stetson | | – | | 5 | – | 2 | – | 0 |
| Livingstone | | – | | 3 | – | 1 | – | 1 |
| Louisville | | – | | 3 | – | 1 | – | 0 |
| Morris Harvey | | – | | 3 | – | 1 | – | 0 |
| Mississippi Normal | | – | | 2 | – | 1 | – | 0 |
| South Carolina | | – | | 5 | – | 2 | – | 1 |
| Navy | | – | | 6 | – | 3 | – | 0 |
| Spring Hill | | – | | 4 | – | 2 | – | 0 |
| Oklahoma | | – | | 5 | – | 4 | – | 0 |
| Rice | | – | | 3 | – | 2 | – | 0 |
| Chattanooga | | – | | 4 | – | 4 | – | 0 |
| Sam Houston Normal | | – | | 2 | – | 2 | – | 0 |
| Southwest Texas State | | – | | 3 | – | 3 | – | 2 |
| Davidson | | – | | 3 | – | 4 | – | 0 |
| Marshall | | – | | 3 | – | 4 | – | 0 |
| Southwestern Louisiana Industrial | | – | | 3 | – | 4 | – | 0 |
| Tennessee Docs | | – | | 3 | – | 4 | – | 0 |
| Arkansas | | – | | 4 | – | 6 | – | 0 |
| Baylor | | – | | 3 | – | 5 | – | 0 |
| Catholic University | | – | | 3 | – | 5 | – | 0 |
| Louisiana Industrial | | – | | 1 | – | 2 | – | 1 |
| West Tennessee State Normal | | – | | 1 | – | 2 | – | 1 |
| Wake Forest | | – | | 2 | – | 6 | – | 0 |
| Kendall | | – | | 1 | – | 4 | – | 0 |
| Delaware | | – | | 1 | – | 6 | – | 1 |
| Birmingham | | – | | 1 | – | 6 | – | 0 |
| Biddle | | – | | 0 | – | 1 | – | 0 |

The 1912 West Virginia Mountaineers football team was an American football team that represented West Virginia University as an independent during the 1912 college football season. In its first and only season under head coach William P. Edmunds, the team compiled a 6–3 record and outscored opponents by a total of 131 to 106. Carl G. Bachman was the team captain.

== Schedule ==
| Date | Opponent | Site | Result |
|---|---|---|---|
| October 5 | West Virginia Wesleyan | Morgantown, WV | L 14–19 |
| October 12 | Westminster (PA) | Morgantown, WV | W 7–0 |
| October 19 | Geneva | Morgantown, WV | W 20–13 |
| October 26 | Ohio | Morgantown, WV | W 6–0 |
| November 2 | Allegheny | Morgantown, WV | W 8–7 |
| November 9 | at Marietta | Marietta, OH | W 22–6 |
| November 16 | at VPI | Blacksburg, VA (rivalry) | L 0–41 |
| November 23 | Waynesburg | Morgantown, WV | W 48–3 |
| November 28 | vs. Denison | Fairmont, WV | L 6–17 |
