= 1912 Sam Houston Normal football team =

American college football season

1912 Sam Houston Normal football
- Conference: Independent
- Record: 2–2
- Head coach: Sheldon R. Warner (1st season)
- Home stadium: Pritchett Field

1912 Southern college football independents records
	Conf.			Overall
Team	W	L	T	W		L		T
Middle Tennessee State Normal		–		1	–	0	–	0
Texas		–		7	–	1	–	0
VMI		–		7	–	1	–	0
Maryland		–		6	–	1	–	1
Oklahoma A&M		–		5	–	2	–	0
Stetson		–		5	–	2	–	0
Livingstone		–		3	–	1	–	1
Louisville		–		3	–	1	–	0
Mississippi Normal		–		2	–	1	–	0
South Carolina		–		5	–	2	–	1
Navy		–		6	–	3	–	0
Spring Hill		–		4	–	2	–	0
West Virginia		–		6	–	3	–	0
Oklahoma		–		5	–	4	–	0
Rice		–		3	–	2	–	0
Chattanooga		–		4	–	4	–	0
Morris Harvey		–		2	–	2	–	0
Sam Houston Normal		–		2	–	2	–	0
Southwest Texas State		–		3	–	3	–	2
Davidson		–		3	–	4	–	0
Marshall		–		3	–	4	–	0
Southwestern Louisiana Industrial		–		3	–	4	–	0
Tennessee Docs		–		3	–	4	–	0
Arkansas		–		4	–	6	–	0
Baylor		–		3	–	5	–	0
Catholic University		–		3	–	5	–	0
Louisiana Industrial		–		1	–	2	–	1
West Tennessee State Normal		–		1	–	2	–	1
Wake Forest		–		2	–	6	–	0
Kendall		–		1	–	4	–	0
Delaware		–		1	–	6	–	1
Birmingham		–		1	–	6	–	0
Biddle		–		0	–	1	–	0

The 1912 Sam Houston Normal football team represented Sam Houston Normal Institute—now known as Sam Houston State University—as an independent during the 1912 college football season. Led by first-year head coach Sheldon R. Warner, Sam Houston Normal compiled a record of 2–2. The team played home games at Pritchett Field in Huntsville, Texas.

== Schedule ==
Date	Opponent	Site	Result	Source
October 23	Huntsville High School	Huntsville, TX	W 18–0 (practice)	
November 9	Rice	Pritchett Field; Huntsville, TX	L 6–20	
November ?	Alexander Institute	Huntsville, TX	L 7–19	
November 23	Bryan Baptist Academy	Huntsville, TX	W 19–5 or 19–6	
November 30	at Blinn	Brenham, TX	W 16–6	
