= 1912 Kendall Orange and Black football team =

American college football season

1912 Kendall Orange and Black football
- Conference: Independent
- Record: 1–4
- Head coach: Harvey Allen (1st season)
- Home stadium: South Main Park

1912 Southern college football independents records
	Conf.			Overall
Team	W	L	T	W		L		T
Middle Tennessee State Normal		–		1	–	0	–	0
Texas		–		7	–	1	–	0
VMI		–		7	–	1	–	0
Maryland		–		6	–	1	–	1
Oklahoma A&M		–		5	–	2	–	0
Stetson		–		5	–	2	–	0
Livingstone		–		3	–	1	–	1
Louisville		–		3	–	1	–	0
Mississippi Normal		–		2	–	1	–	0
South Carolina		–		5	–	2	–	1
Navy		–		6	–	3	–	0
Spring Hill		–		4	–	2	–	0
West Virginia		–		6	–	3	–	0
Oklahoma		–		5	–	4	–	0
Rice		–		3	–	2	–	0
Chattanooga		–		4	–	4	–	0
Morris Harvey		–		2	–	2	–	0
Sam Houston Normal		–		2	–	2	–	0
Southwest Texas State		–		3	–	3	–	2
Davidson		–		3	–	4	–	0
Marshall		–		3	–	4	–	0
Southwestern Louisiana Industrial		–		3	–	4	–	0
Tennessee Docs		–		3	–	4	–	0
Arkansas		–		4	–	6	–	0
Baylor		–		3	–	5	–	0
Catholic University		–		3	–	5	–	0
Louisiana Industrial		–		1	–	2	–	1
West Tennessee State Normal		–		1	–	2	–	1
Wake Forest		–		2	–	6	–	0
Kendall		–		1	–	4	–	0
Delaware		–		1	–	6	–	1
Birmingham		–		1	–	6	–	0
Biddle		–		0	–	1	–	0

The 1912 Kendall Orange and Black football team represented Henry Kendall College (later renamed the University of Tulsa) during the 1912 college football season. In its first and only season under head coach Harvey Allen, the team compiled a 1–4 record and was outscored by its opponents by a total of 141 to 75.

Prior to 1912, Kendall had played only a handful of intercollegiate football games in the 20th century. For the 1912 season, Kendall hired a regular coach, H. L. Allen. Prior to the start of the season, The Tulsa Daily World wrote:

"The sound of rough-shod toes coming sharply in contact will be wafted on the gentle breezes that float around Kendall college next week. They're going to have a regular football team at Kendall this year, with a regular coach and regular players. . . . All this should sound mighty good to the athletic-loving folks of Tulsa town, for it means that Kendall college is at last coming into her own."

The paper described the newly arrived coach and athletic director as "young, strong and energetic, a splendid athlete himself."

On September 27, 1912, the team played the school's first intercollegiate football game since 1909, losing to Oklahoma Methodist University (later known as Oklahoma City University) at Guthrie, Oklahoma, by a 39–6 score. After the game, The Tulsa Daily World praised the "wonderful showing" and wrote that the Kendall team had "demonstrated the face that at last Tulsa is to be placed upon the collegiate football map of Oklahoma in a convincing manner." In a case of mistaken identity, star guard William Maulson was arrested as a suspected train robber in Muskogee, Oklahoma, in late October or early November 1912.

== Schedule ==
Date	Opponent	Site	Result
September 27	at Oklahoma Methodist	Guthrie, OK	L 6–39
November 1	at Northeastern State	Tahlequah, OK	L 6–32
November 18	at Euchee Indians	Sapulpa, OK	W 57–0
November 28	Central High School	South Main Park; Tulsa, OK	L 6–32
