= 1912 Maryland Aggies football team =

American college football season

1912 Maryland Aggies football
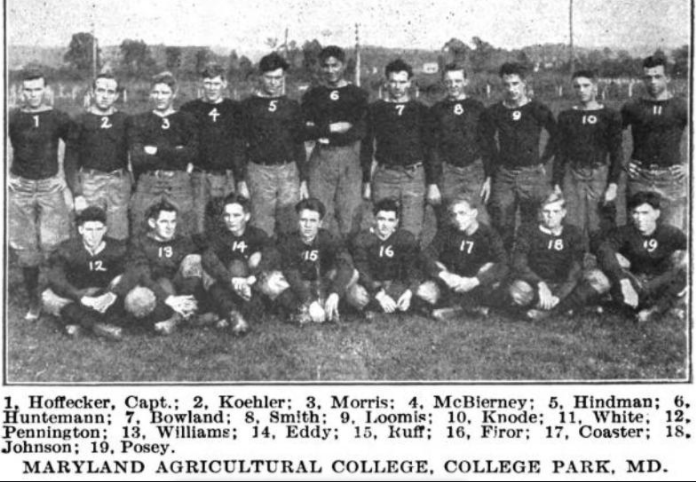
- Conference: Independent
- Record: 6–1–1
- Head coach: Curley Byrd (2nd season)
- Captain: Hoffecker

1912 Southern college football independents records
	Conf.			Overall
Team	W	L	T	W		L		T
Middle Tennessee State Normal		–		1	–	0	–	0
Texas		–		7	–	1	–	0
VMI		–		7	–	1	–	0
Maryland		–		6	–	1	–	1
Oklahoma A&M		–		5	–	2	–	0
Stetson		–		5	–	2	–	0
Livingstone		–		3	–	1	–	1
Louisville		–		3	–	1	–	0
Mississippi Normal		–		2	–	1	–	0
South Carolina		–		5	–	2	–	1
Navy		–		6	–	3	–	0
Spring Hill		–		4	–	2	–	0
West Virginia		–		6	–	3	–	0
Oklahoma		–		5	–	4	–	0
Rice		–		3	–	2	–	0
Chattanooga		–		4	–	4	–	0
Morris Harvey		–		2	–	2	–	0
Sam Houston Normal		–		2	–	2	–	0
Southwest Texas State		–		3	–	3	–	2
Davidson		–		3	–	4	–	0
Marshall		–		3	–	4	–	0
Southwestern Louisiana Industrial		–		3	–	4	–	0
Tennessee Docs		–		3	–	4	–	0
Arkansas		–		4	–	6	–	0
Baylor		–		3	–	5	–	0
Catholic University		–		3	–	5	–	0
Louisiana Industrial		–		1	–	2	–	1
West Tennessee State Normal		–		1	–	2	–	1
Wake Forest		–		2	–	6	–	0
Kendall		–		1	–	4	–	0
Delaware		–		1	–	6	–	1
Birmingham		–		1	–	6	–	0
Biddle		–		0	–	1	–	0

The 1912 Maryland Aggies football team was an American football team that represented Maryland Agricultural College (which became Maryland State College in 1916 and part of the University of Maryland in 1920) as an independent during the 1912 college football season. In their second season under head coach Curley Byrd, the Aggies compiled a 6–1–1 record and outscored all opponents by a total of 191 to 60.

Halfback Hoffecker was the team captain.

== Schedule ==
Date	Opponent	Site	Result	Attendance	Source
September 28	Technical High School (Washington, DC)	College Park, MD	W 31–6		
October 5	at Richmond	Broad Street Park; Richmond, VA	W 46–0		
October 12	at Johns Hopkins	Homewood Field; Baltimore, MD	W 13–0		
October 19	University of Maryland	College Park, MD	W 58–6		
October 26	at St. John's (MD)	Annapolis, MD	L 0–27		
November 9	at Gallaudet	Kendall Green; Washington, DC	W 13–7		
November 23	at Western Maryland	Westminster, MD	W 17–7		
November 28	at Pennsylvania Military	Chester, PA	T 13–13		
