= 1912 Delaware Fightin' Blue Hens football team =

American college football season

1912 Delaware Fightin' Blue Hens football
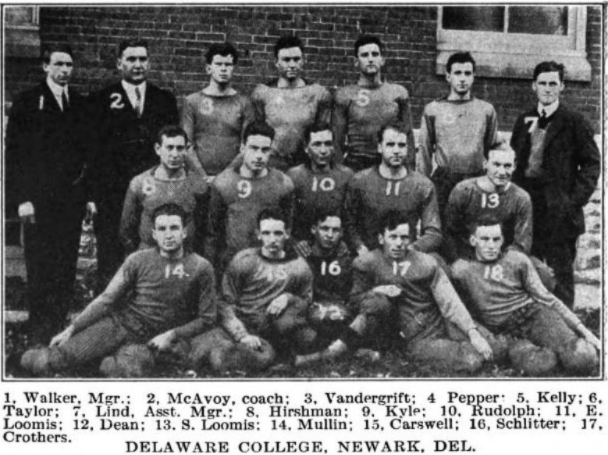
- Conference: Independent
- Record: 1–6–1
- Head coach: William McAvoy (5th season)
- Captain: Arthur C. Huston

1912 Southern college football independents records
	Conf.			Overall
Team	W	L	T	W		L		T
Middle Tennessee State Normal		–		1	–	0	–	0
Texas		–		7	–	1	–	0
VMI		–		7	–	1	–	0
Maryland		–		6	–	1	–	1
Oklahoma A&M		–		5	–	2	–	0
Stetson		–		5	–	2	–	0
Livingstone		–		3	–	1	–	1
Louisville		–		3	–	1	–	0
Mississippi Normal		–		2	–	1	–	0
South Carolina		–		5	–	2	–	1
Navy		–		6	–	3	–	0
Spring Hill		–		4	–	2	–	0
West Virginia		–		6	–	3	–	0
Oklahoma		–		5	–	4	–	0
Rice		–		3	–	2	–	0
Chattanooga		–		4	–	4	–	0
Morris Harvey		–		2	–	2	–	0
Sam Houston Normal		–		2	–	2	–	0
Southwest Texas State		–		3	–	3	–	2
Davidson		–		3	–	4	–	0
Marshall		–		3	–	4	–	0
Southwestern Louisiana Industrial		–		3	–	4	–	0
Tennessee Docs		–		3	–	4	–	0
Arkansas		–		4	–	6	–	0
Baylor		–		3	–	5	–	0
Catholic University		–		3	–	5	–	0
Louisiana Industrial		–		1	–	2	–	1
West Tennessee State Normal		–		1	–	2	–	1
Wake Forest		–		2	–	6	–	0
Kendall		–		1	–	4	–	0
Delaware		–		1	–	6	–	1
Birmingham		–		1	–	6	–	0
Biddle		–		0	–	1	–	0

The 1912 Delaware Fightin' Blue Hens football team, also known as "Old Delaware" and the "Main Line team", was an American football team that represented Delaware College (later renamed the University of Delaware) as an independent during the 1912 college football season. In its fifth season under head coach William McAvoy, the team compiled a 1–6–1 record and was outscored by a total of 121 to 50. Arthur C. Huston was the team captain. The team played its home games in Newark, Delaware.

== Schedule ==
Date	Opponent	Site	Result	Attendance	Source
September 28	at Lehigh	Lehigh Field; Bethlehem, PA (rivalry)	L 0–45		
October 5	at Haverford	Haverford, PA	L 0–14		
October 12	Lebanon Valley	Newark, DE	T 0–0		
October 19	at Washington College	Chestertown, MD	L 0–7		
October 26	Muhlenberg	Newark, DE	L 0–21		
November 2	Catholic University	Newark, DE	L 0–7		
November 9	at Gettysburg	Nixon Field; Gettysburg, PA	L 0–27		
November 16	University of Maryland, Baltimore	Newark, DE	W 50–0		
