= 1912 Wake Forest Baptists football team =

American college football season

1912 Wake Forest Baptists football
- Conference: Independent
- Record: 2–6
- Head coach: Frank Thompson (2nd season)
- Captain: Bruce Holding

1912 Southern college football independents records
	Conf.			Overall
Team	W	L	T	W		L		T
Middle Tennessee State Normal		–		1	–	0	–	0
Texas		–		7	–	1	–	0
VMI		–		7	–	1	–	0
Maryland		–		6	–	1	–	1
Oklahoma A&M		–		5	–	2	–	0
Stetson		–		5	–	2	–	0
Livingstone		–		3	–	1	–	1
Louisville		–		3	–	1	–	0
Mississippi Normal		–		2	–	1	–	0
South Carolina		–		5	–	2	–	1
Navy		–		6	–	3	–	0
Spring Hill		–		4	–	2	–	0
West Virginia		–		6	–	3	–	0
Oklahoma		–		5	–	4	–	0
Rice		–		3	–	2	–	0
Chattanooga		–		4	–	4	–	0
Morris Harvey		–		2	–	2	–	0
Sam Houston Normal		–		2	–	2	–	0
Southwest Texas State		–		3	–	3	–	2
Davidson		–		3	–	4	–	0
Marshall		–		3	–	4	–	0
Southwestern Louisiana Industrial		–		3	–	4	–	0
Tennessee Docs		–		3	–	4	–	0
Arkansas		–		4	–	6	–	0
Baylor		–		3	–	5	–	0
Catholic University		–		3	–	5	–	0
Louisiana Industrial		–		1	–	2	–	1
West Tennessee State Normal		–		1	–	2	–	1
Wake Forest		–		2	–	6	–	0
Kendall		–		1	–	4	–	0
Delaware		–		1	–	6	–	1
Birmingham		–		1	–	6	–	0
Biddle		–		0	–	1	–	0

The 1912 Wake Forest Baptists football team was an American football team that represented Wake Forest College (now known as Wake Forest University) as an independent during the 1912 college football season. In their second year under head coach Frank Thompson, the team compiled a 2–6 record.

== Schedule ==
Date	Opponent	Site	Result	Source
September 28	University College of Medicine, Richmond	Wake Forest, NC	W 33–0	
October 5	at South Carolina	Davis Field; Columbia, SC	L 3–10	
October 12	at North Carolina	Campus Athletic Field; Chapel Hill, NC (rivalry)	L 2–9	
October 26	at Washington and Lee	Wilson Field; Lexington, VA	L 0–20	
November 2	North Carolina A&M	Wake Forest, NC (rivlary)	L 0–12	
November 9	Virginia Medical College	Wake Forest, NC	L 14–23	
November 16	Horner	Wake Forest, NC	W 49–0	
November 28	vs. Davidson	Wearn Field; Charlotte, NC	L 7–13	
