= 1912 Southwestern Louisiana Industrial football team =

American college football season

1912 Southwestern Louisiana Industrial football
- Conference: Independent
- Record: 3–4
- Head coach: H. Lee Prather (1st season)
- Home stadium: Campus Athletic Field

1912 Southern college football independents records
	Conf.			Overall
Team	W	L	T	W		L		T
Middle Tennessee State Normal		–		1	–	0	–	0
Texas		–		7	–	1	–	0
VMI		–		7	–	1	–	0
Maryland		–		6	–	1	–	1
Oklahoma A&M		–		5	–	2	–	0
Stetson		–		5	–	2	–	0
Livingstone		–		3	–	1	–	1
Louisville		–		3	–	1	–	0
Mississippi Normal		–		2	–	1	–	0
South Carolina		–		5	–	2	–	1
Navy		–		6	–	3	–	0
Spring Hill		–		4	–	2	–	0
West Virginia		–		6	–	3	–	0
Oklahoma		–		5	–	4	–	0
Rice		–		3	–	2	–	0
Chattanooga		–		4	–	4	–	0
Morris Harvey		–		2	–	2	–	0
Sam Houston Normal		–		2	–	2	–	0
Southwest Texas State		–		3	–	3	–	2
Davidson		–		3	–	4	–	0
Marshall		–		3	–	4	–	0
Southwestern Louisiana Industrial		–		3	–	4	–	0
Tennessee Docs		–		3	–	4	–	0
Arkansas		–		4	–	6	–	0
Baylor		–		3	–	5	–	0
Catholic University		–		3	–	5	–	0
Louisiana Industrial		–		1	–	2	–	1
West Tennessee State Normal		–		1	–	2	–	1
Wake Forest		–		2	–	6	–	0
Kendall		–		1	–	4	–	0
Delaware		–		1	–	6	–	1
Birmingham		–		1	–	6	–	0
Biddle		–		0	–	1	–	0

The 1912 Southwestern Louisiana Industrial football team was an American football team that represented the Southwestern Louisiana Industrial Institute (now known as the University of Louisiana at Lafayette) as an independent during the 1912 college football season. In their first year under head coach H. Lee Prather, the team compiled a 3–4 record.

== Schedule ==
Date	Opponent	Site	Result	Source
September 28	Morgan City High School	Campus Athletic Field; Lafayette, LA	W 33–0	
October 5	at LSU	State Field; Baton Rouge, LA	L 3–85	
October 12	at Tulane	Tulane Stadium; New Orleans, LA	L 0–95	
October 22	Louisiana College	Campus Athletic Field; Lafayette, LA	W 19–0	
November 2	at Jefferson College	Convent, LA	L 0–46	
November 9	Loyola (LA)	Campus Athletic Field; Lafayette, LA	W 29–0	
November 16	Louisiana Normal	Campus Athletic Field; Lafayette, LA	L 6–13	
