= 1912 Oklahoma A&M Aggies football team =

American college football season

1912 Oklahoma A&M Aggies football
- Conference: Independent
- Record: 5–2
- Head coach: Paul J. Davis (4th season)

1912 Southern college football independents records
	Conf.			Overall
Team	W	L	T	W		L		T
Middle Tennessee State Normal		–		1	–	0	–	0
Texas		–		7	–	1	–	0
VMI		–		7	–	1	–	0
Maryland		–		6	–	1	–	1
Oklahoma A&M		–		5	–	2	–	0
Stetson		–		5	–	2	–	0
Livingstone		–		3	–	1	–	1
Louisville		–		3	–	1	–	0
Mississippi Normal		–		2	–	1	–	0
South Carolina		–		5	–	2	–	1
Navy		–		6	–	3	–	0
Spring Hill		–		4	–	2	–	0
West Virginia		–		6	–	3	–	0
Oklahoma		–		5	–	4	–	0
Rice		–		3	–	2	–	0
Chattanooga		–		4	–	4	–	0
Morris Harvey		–		2	–	2	–	0
Sam Houston Normal		–		2	–	2	–	0
Southwest Texas State		–		3	–	3	–	2
Davidson		–		3	–	4	–	0
Marshall		–		3	–	4	–	0
Southwestern Louisiana Industrial		–		3	–	4	–	0
Tennessee Docs		–		3	–	4	–	0
Arkansas		–		4	–	6	–	0
Baylor		–		3	–	5	–	0
Catholic University		–		3	–	5	–	0
Louisiana Industrial		–		1	–	2	–	1
West Tennessee State Normal		–		1	–	2	–	1
Wake Forest		–		2	–	6	–	0
Kendall		–		1	–	4	–	0
Delaware		–		1	–	6	–	1
Birmingham		–		1	–	6	–	0
Biddle		–		0	–	1	–	0

The 1912 Oklahoma A&M Aggies football team represented Oklahoma A&M College in the 1912 college football season. This was the 12th year of football at A&M and the fourth under Paul J. Davis. The Aggies played their home games in Stillwater, Oklahoma. They finished the season 5–2.

== Schedule ==
Date	Opponent	Site	Result	Attendance	Source
October 4	Central State Normal	Stillwater, OK	W 81–0		
October 11	Blackwell	Stillwater, OK	W 79–0		
October 19	at Arkansas	The Hill; Fayetteville, AR	W 13–7		
November 1	at Baker	Baldwin City, KS	W 37–13		
November 9	Oklahoma Methodist	Lewis Field; Stillwater, OK	W 90–0		
November 16	at Oklahoma	Norman, OK (Bedlam)	L 0–16		
November 28	at Missouri Mines	Rolla, MO	L 7–13	2,000	
