= 1912 Tennessee Docs football team =

American college football season

1912 Tennessee Docs football
- Conference: Independent
- Record: 3–4
- Head coach: Arthur Halle
- Captain: Mann
- Home stadium: Red Elm Park

1912 Southern college football independents records
	Conf.			Overall
Team	W	L	T	W		L		T
Middle Tennessee State Normal		–		1	–	0	–	0
Texas		–		7	–	1	–	0
VMI		–		7	–	1	–	0
Maryland		–		6	–	1	–	1
Oklahoma A&M		–		5	–	2	–	0
Stetson		–		5	–	2	–	0
Livingstone		–		3	–	1	–	1
Louisville		–		3	–	1	–	0
Mississippi Normal		–		2	–	1	–	0
South Carolina		–		5	–	2	–	1
Navy		–		6	–	3	–	0
Spring Hill		–		4	–	2	–	0
West Virginia		–		6	–	3	–	0
Oklahoma		–		5	–	4	–	0
Rice		–		3	–	2	–	0
Chattanooga		–		4	–	4	–	0
Morris Harvey		–		2	–	2	–	0
Sam Houston Normal		–		2	–	2	–	0
Southwest Texas State		–		3	–	3	–	2
Davidson		–		3	–	4	–	0
Marshall		–		3	–	4	–	0
Southwestern Louisiana Industrial		–		3	–	4	–	0
Tennessee Docs		–		3	–	4	–	0
Arkansas		–		4	–	6	–	0
Baylor		–		3	–	5	–	0
Catholic University		–		3	–	5	–	0
Louisiana Industrial		–		1	–	2	–	1
West Tennessee State Normal		–		1	–	2	–	1
Wake Forest		–		2	–	6	–	0
Kendall		–		1	–	4	–	0
Delaware		–		1	–	6	–	1
Birmingham		–		1	–	6	–	0
Biddle		–		0	–	1	–	0

The 1912 Tennessee Docs football team represented University of Tennessee College of Medicine as an independent during the 1912 college football season. The team was coached by Arthur Halle.

== Schedule ==
Date	Opponent	Site	Result	Source
October 5	Alumni	Red Elm Park; Memphis, TN	W 13–0	
October 12	at Mississippi A&M	Hardy Field; Starkville, MS	L 0–32	
October 19	Tennessee	Red Elm Park; Memphis, TN	L 0–62	
October 26	Central High School	Red Elm Park; Memphis, TN	L 6–13	
November 2	Memphis University School	Memphis, TN	W 35–0	
November 8	at Holly Springs Athletic Club	Holly Springs, MS	W 26–6	
November 16	Ole Miss	Red Elm Park; Memphis, TN	L 6–47	
