= 1912 West Tennessee State Normal football team =

American college football season

1912 West Tennessee State Normal football
- Conference: Independent
- Record: 1–2–1
- Head coach: Clyde H. Wilson (1st season)
- Captain: Victor Davis
- Home stadium: Normal Field, Red Elm Park

1912 Southern college football independents records
	Conf.			Overall
Team	W	L	T	W		L		T
Middle Tennessee State Normal		–		1	–	0	–	0
Texas		–		7	–	1	–	0
VMI		–		7	–	1	–	0
Maryland		–		6	–	1	–	1
Oklahoma A&M		–		5	–	2	–	0
Stetson		–		5	–	2	–	0
Livingstone		–		3	–	1	–	1
Louisville		–		3	–	1	–	0
Mississippi Normal		–		2	–	1	–	0
South Carolina		–		5	–	2	–	1
Navy		–		6	–	3	–	0
Spring Hill		–		4	–	2	–	0
West Virginia		–		6	–	3	–	0
Oklahoma		–		5	–	4	–	0
Rice		–		3	–	2	–	0
Chattanooga		–		4	–	4	–	0
Morris Harvey		–		2	–	2	–	0
Sam Houston Normal		–		2	–	2	–	0
Southwest Texas State		–		3	–	3	–	2
Davidson		–		3	–	4	–	0
Marshall		–		3	–	4	–	0
Southwestern Louisiana Industrial		–		3	–	4	–	0
Tennessee Docs		–		3	–	4	–	0
Arkansas		–		4	–	6	–	0
Baylor		–		3	–	5	–	0
Catholic University		–		3	–	5	–	0
Louisiana Industrial		–		1	–	2	–	1
West Tennessee State Normal		–		1	–	2	–	1
Wake Forest		–		2	–	6	–	0
Kendall		–		1	–	4	–	0
Delaware		–		1	–	6	–	1
Birmingham		–		1	–	6	–	0
Biddle		–		0	–	1	–	0

The 1912 West Tennessee State Normal football team was an American football team that represented West Tennessee State Normal School (now known as the University of Memphis) as an independent during the 1912 college football season. In their first season under head coach Clyde H. Wilson, West Tennessee State Normal compiled a 1–2–1 record.

== Schedule ==
Date	Time	Opponent	Site	Result	Source
October 5	2:00 p.m.	Memphis University School	Red Elm Park; Memphis, TN	T 0–0	
October 26		Bolton College	Normal Field; Memphis, TN	W 13–0	
November 8	3:30 p.m.	Christian Brothers	Normal campus; Memphis, TN	L 0–13	
November 16		Memphis University School	Normal campus; Memphis, TN	L 0–12	
