= 1912 Rice Grays football team =

American college football season

1912 Rice Grays football
- Conference: Independent
- Record: 3–2
- Head coach: Philip Arbuckle (1st season)
- Captain: R. E. Cummings
- Home stadium: West End Park

1912 Southern college football independents records
| | Conf. | | | Overall |
| Team | W | L | T | W | | L | | T |
|---|---|---|---|---|---|---|---|---|
| Middle Tennessee State Normal | | – | | 1 | – | 0 | – | 0 |
| Texas | | – | | 7 | – | 1 | – | 0 |
| VMI | | – | | 7 | – | 1 | – | 0 |
| Maryland | | – | | 6 | – | 1 | – | 1 |
| Oklahoma A&M | | – | | 5 | – | 2 | – | 0 |
| Stetson | | – | | 5 | – | 2 | – | 0 |
| Livingstone | | – | | 3 | – | 1 | – | 1 |
| Louisville | | – | | 3 | – | 1 | – | 0 |
| Mississippi Normal | | – | | 2 | – | 1 | – | 0 |
| South Carolina | | – | | 5 | – | 2 | – | 1 |
| Navy | | – | | 6 | – | 3 | – | 0 |
| Spring Hill | | – | | 4 | – | 2 | – | 0 |
| West Virginia | | – | | 6 | – | 3 | – | 0 |
| Oklahoma | | – | | 5 | – | 4 | – | 0 |
| Rice | | – | | 3 | – | 2 | – | 0 |
| Chattanooga | | – | | 4 | – | 4 | – | 0 |
| Morris Harvey | | – | | 2 | – | 2 | – | 0 |
| Sam Houston Normal | | – | | 2 | – | 2 | – | 0 |
| Southwest Texas State | | – | | 3 | – | 3 | – | 2 |
| Davidson | | – | | 3 | – | 4 | – | 0 |
| Marshall | | – | | 3 | – | 4 | – | 0 |
| Southwestern Louisiana Industrial | | – | | 3 | – | 4 | – | 0 |
| Tennessee Docs | | – | | 3 | – | 4 | – | 0 |
| Arkansas | | – | | 4 | – | 6 | – | 0 |
| Baylor | | – | | 3 | – | 5 | – | 0 |
| Catholic University | | – | | 3 | – | 5 | – | 0 |
| Louisiana Industrial | | – | | 1 | – | 2 | – | 1 |
| West Tennessee State Normal | | – | | 1 | – | 2 | – | 1 |
| Wake Forest | | – | | 2 | – | 6 | – | 0 |
| Kendall | | – | | 1 | – | 4 | – | 0 |
| Delaware | | – | | 1 | – | 6 | – | 1 |
| Birmingham | | – | | 1 | – | 6 | – | 0 |
| Biddle | | – | | 0 | – | 1 | – | 0 |

The 1912 Rice Grays football team was an American football team that represented Rice Institute as an independent during the 1912 college football season. The team compiled a 3–2 record and was outscored by a total of 125 to 40.

Rice Institute opened its doors in the fall of 1912, and its first football team was made up of 21 students from the incoming freshmen class. In its first game, the team defeated Houston High School by a 7–6 score. In its first intercollegiate football game, the team defeated Sam Houston Normal by a 20–6 score in Huntsville, Texas.

Philip Arbuckle was hired in 1912 as the football coach and the head of the entire Rice athletic program. Arbuckle was at the time a 28-year-old Illinois native and University of Chicago graduate.

The team played its two home games during the 1912 season at West End Park in Houston. Plans were set in motion to build athletic field on the campus with seating for 12,000 persons to be opened in 1913.

At the end of the 1912 season, end George Journeay was selected to be the captain of the 1913 Rice team.

== Schedule ==
| Date | Opponent | Site | Result | Source |
|---|---|---|---|---|
| October 26 | vs. Houston High School | West End Park; Houston, TX | W 7–6 | |
| October 30 | at Orange High School | West End Park; Orange, TX | W 13–0 | |
| November 9 | at Sam Houston Normal | Pritchett Field; Huntsville, TX | W 20–6 | |
| November 15 | at Southwestern (TX) | Georgetown, TX | L 0–32 | |
| November 28 | Austin | West End Park; Houston, TX | L 0–81 | |
