= 1912 Navy Midshipmen football team =

American college football season

1912 Navy Midshipmen football
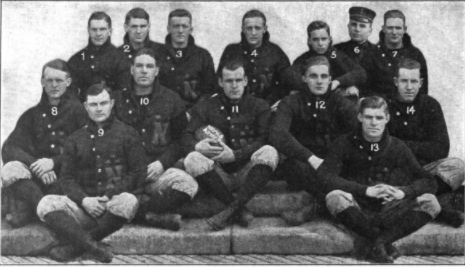
- Conference: Independent
- Record: 6–3
- Head coach: Douglas Legate Howard (2nd season)
- Captain: Pete Rodes
- Home stadium: Worden Field

1912 Southern college football independents records
	Conf.			Overall
Team	W	L	T	W		L		T
Middle Tennessee State Normal		–		1	–	0	–	0
Texas		–		7	–	1	–	0
VMI		–		7	–	1	–	0
Maryland		–		6	–	1	–	1
Oklahoma A&M		–		5	–	2	–	0
Stetson		–		5	–	2	–	0
Livingstone		–		3	–	1	–	1
Louisville		–		3	–	1	–	0
Mississippi Normal		–		2	–	1	–	0
South Carolina		–		5	–	2	–	1
Navy		–		6	–	3	–	0
Spring Hill		–		4	–	2	–	0
West Virginia		–		6	–	3	–	0
Oklahoma		–		5	–	4	–	0
Rice		–		3	–	2	–	0
Chattanooga		–		4	–	4	–	0
Morris Harvey		–		2	–	2	–	0
Sam Houston Normal		–		2	–	2	–	0
Southwest Texas State		–		3	–	3	–	2
Davidson		–		3	–	4	–	0
Marshall		–		3	–	4	–	0
Southwestern Louisiana Industrial		–		3	–	4	–	0
Tennessee Docs		–		3	–	4	–	0
Arkansas		–		4	–	6	–	0
Baylor		–		3	–	5	–	0
Catholic University		–		3	–	5	–	0
Louisiana Industrial		–		1	–	2	–	1
West Tennessee State Normal		–		1	–	2	–	1
Wake Forest		–		2	–	6	–	0
Kendall		–		1	–	4	–	0
Delaware		–		1	–	6	–	1
Birmingham		–		1	–	6	–	0
Biddle		–		0	–	1	–	0

The 1912 Navy Midshipmen football team represented the United States Naval Academy during the 1912 college football season. In their second season under head coach Douglas Legate Howard, the team compiled a 6–3 record, shut out four opponents, and defeated its opponents by a combined score of 125 to 61.

The annual Army–Navy Game was played on November 30 at Franklin Field in Philadelphia; Navy won 6–0.

== Schedule ==
Date	Opponent	Site	Result	Attendance	Source
October 5	Johns Hopkins	Worden Field; Annapolis, MD (rivalry)	W 7–3		
October 12	Lehigh	Worden Field; Annapolis, MD	L 0–14		
October 19	Swarthmore	Worden Field; Annapolis, MD	L 6–21		
October 26	Pittsburgh	Worden Field; Annapolis, MD	W 13–6	3,000	
November 1	Western Reserve	Worden Field; Annapolis, MD	W 7–0		
November 9	Bucknell	Worden Field; Annapolis, MD	L 7–17		
November 16	North Carolina A&M	Worden Field; Annapolis, MD	W 40–0		
November 23	NYU	Worden Field; Annapolis, MD	W 39–0		
November 30	vs. Army	Franklin Field; Philadelphia, PA (Army–Navy Game)	W 6–0	35,000	
