= 1912 South Carolina Gamecocks football team =

American college football season

1912 South Carolina Gamecocks football

State champion
- Conference: Independent
- Record: 5–2–1
- Head coach: Norman B. Edgerton (1st season)
- Captain: Alfred von Kolnitz
- Home stadium: Davis Field

1912 Southern college football independents records
	Conf.			Overall
Team	W	L	T	W		L		T
Middle Tennessee State Normal		–		1	–	0	–	0
Texas		–		7	–	1	–	0
VMI		–		7	–	1	–	0
Maryland		–		6	–	1	–	1
Oklahoma A&M		–		5	–	2	–	0
Stetson		–		5	–	2	–	0
Livingstone		–		3	–	1	–	1
Louisville		–		3	–	1	–	0
Mississippi Normal		–		2	–	1	–	0
South Carolina		–		5	–	2	–	1
Navy		–		6	–	3	–	0
Spring Hill		–		4	–	2	–	0
West Virginia		–		6	–	3	–	0
Oklahoma		–		5	–	4	–	0
Rice		–		3	–	2	–	0
Chattanooga		–		4	–	4	–	0
Morris Harvey		–		2	–	2	–	0
Sam Houston Normal		–		2	–	2	–	0
Southwest Texas State		–		3	–	3	–	2
Davidson		–		3	–	4	–	0
Marshall		–		3	–	4	–	0
Southwestern Louisiana Industrial		–		3	–	4	–	0
Tennessee Docs		–		3	–	4	–	0
Arkansas		–		4	–	6	–	0
Baylor		–		3	–	5	–	0
Catholic University		–		3	–	5	–	0
Louisiana Industrial		–		1	–	2	–	1
West Tennessee State Normal		–		1	–	2	–	1
Wake Forest		–		2	–	6	–	0
Kendall		–		1	–	4	–	0
Delaware		–		1	–	6	–	1
Birmingham		–		1	–	6	–	0
Biddle		–		0	–	1	–	0

The 1912 South Carolina Gamecocks football team represented the University of South Carolina as an independent during the 1912 college football season. Led by first-year Norman B. Edgerton, the Gamecocks compiled a record of 5–2–1. The team won the mythical state championship of South Carolina.

== Schedule ==
Date	Opponent	Site	Result	Attendance	Source
October 5	Wake Forest	Davis Field; Columbia, SC	W 10–3		
October 14	at Virginia	Madison Hall Field; Charlottesville, VA	L 0–19		
October 19	at Florida	University Field; Gainesville, FL	L 6–10		
October 26	at Charleston	Charleston, SC	W 68–0		
October 31	Clemson	State Fairgrounds; Columbia, SC	W 22–7	3,500	
November 9	at North Carolina	Chapel Hill, NC	T 6–6		
November 16	Porter Military Academy	Davis Field; Columbia, SC	W 66–0		
November 28	The Citadel	Davis Field; Columbia, SC	W 26–2		
