= 1912 Mississippi Normal Normalites football team =

American college football season

1912 Mississippi Normal Normalites football
- Conference: Independent
- Record: 2–1
- Head coach: Ronald J. Slay (1st season)
- Home stadium: Kamper Park

1912 Southern college football independents records
| | Conf. | | | Overall |
| Team | W | L | T | W | | L | | T |
|---|---|---|---|---|---|---|---|---|
| Middle Tennessee State Normal | | – | | 1 | – | 0 | – | 0 |
| Texas | | – | | 7 | – | 1 | – | 0 |
| VMI | | – | | 7 | – | 1 | – | 0 |
| Maryland | | – | | 6 | – | 1 | – | 1 |
| Oklahoma A&M | | – | | 5 | – | 2 | – | 0 |
| Stetson | | – | | 5 | – | 2 | – | 0 |
| Livingstone | | – | | 3 | – | 1 | – | 1 |
| Louisville | | – | | 3 | – | 1 | – | 0 |
| Mississippi Normal | | – | | 2 | – | 1 | – | 0 |
| South Carolina | | – | | 5 | – | 2 | – | 1 |
| Navy | | – | | 6 | – | 3 | – | 0 |
| Spring Hill | | – | | 4 | – | 2 | – | 0 |
| West Virginia | | – | | 6 | – | 3 | – | 0 |
| Oklahoma | | – | | 5 | – | 4 | – | 0 |
| Rice | | – | | 3 | – | 2 | – | 0 |
| Chattanooga | | – | | 4 | – | 4 | – | 0 |
| Morris Harvey | | – | | 2 | – | 2 | – | 0 |
| Sam Houston Normal | | – | | 2 | – | 2 | – | 0 |
| Southwest Texas State | | – | | 3 | – | 3 | – | 2 |
| Davidson | | – | | 3 | – | 4 | – | 0 |
| Marshall | | – | | 3 | – | 4 | – | 0 |
| Southwestern Louisiana Industrial | | – | | 3 | – | 4 | – | 0 |
| Tennessee Docs | | – | | 3 | – | 4 | – | 0 |
| Arkansas | | – | | 4 | – | 6 | – | 0 |
| Baylor | | – | | 3 | – | 5 | – | 0 |
| Catholic University | | – | | 3 | – | 5 | – | 0 |
| Louisiana Industrial | | – | | 1 | – | 2 | – | 1 |
| West Tennessee State Normal | | – | | 1 | – | 2 | – | 1 |
| Wake Forest | | – | | 2 | – | 6 | – | 0 |
| Kendall | | – | | 1 | – | 4 | – | 0 |
| Delaware | | – | | 1 | – | 6 | – | 1 |
| Birmingham | | – | | 1 | – | 6 | – | 0 |
| Biddle | | – | | 0 | – | 1 | – | 0 |

The 1912 Mississippi Normal Normalites football team was an American football team that represented Mississippi Normal College (now known as the University of Southern Mississippi) as an independent during the 1912 college football season. In their only year under head coach Ronald J. Slay, the team compiled a 2–1 record.

== Schedule ==
| Date | Opponent | Site | Result | Source |
|---|---|---|---|---|
| October 13 | Hattiesburg Boy Scouts | Kamper Park; Hattiesburg, MS | W 30–0 | |
| October 19 | Gulf Coast Military Academy | Kamper Park; Hattiesburg, MS | L 0–6 | |
| November 5 | Mobile Military Academy | Kamper Park; Hattiesburg, MS | W 6–0 | |
