= 1912 Chattanooga Moccasins football team =

American college football season

1912 Chattanooga Moccasins football
- Conference: Independent
- Record: 4–4
- Head coach: Leslie Stauffer (3rd season)
- Captain: DeForrest Spencer
- Home stadium: Chamberlain Field

1912 Southern college football independents records
	Conf.			Overall
Team	W	L	T	W		L		T
Middle Tennessee State Normal		–		1	–	0	–	0
Texas		–		7	–	1	–	0
VMI		–		7	–	1	–	0
Maryland		–		6	–	1	–	1
Oklahoma A&M		–		5	–	2	–	0
Stetson		–		5	–	2	–	0
Livingstone		–		3	–	1	–	1
Louisville		–		3	–	1	–	0
Mississippi Normal		–		2	–	1	–	0
South Carolina		–		5	–	2	–	1
Navy		–		6	–	3	–	0
Spring Hill		–		4	–	2	–	0
West Virginia		–		6	–	3	–	0
Oklahoma		–		5	–	4	–	0
Rice		–		3	–	2	–	0
Chattanooga		–		4	–	4	–	0
Morris Harvey		–		2	–	2	–	0
Sam Houston Normal		–		2	–	2	–	0
Southwest Texas State		–		3	–	3	–	2
Davidson		–		3	–	4	–	0
Marshall		–		3	–	4	–	0
Southwestern Louisiana Industrial		–		3	–	4	–	0
Tennessee Docs		–		3	–	4	–	0
Arkansas		–		4	–	6	–	0
Baylor		–		3	–	5	–	0
Catholic University		–		3	–	5	–	0
Louisiana Industrial		–		1	–	2	–	1
West Tennessee State Normal		–		1	–	2	–	1
Wake Forest		–		2	–	6	–	0
Kendall		–		1	–	4	–	0
Delaware		–		1	–	6	–	1
Birmingham		–		1	–	6	–	0
Biddle		–		0	–	1	–	0

The 1912 Chattanooga Moccasins football team represented the University of Chattanooga as an independent during the 1912 college football season. This team finished its eight-game schedule with a record of 4–4.

== Schedule ==
Date	Opponent	Site	Result	Source
October 5	at Georgia	Sanford Field; Athens, GA	L 0–33	
October 12	Alabama Presbyterian	Chamberlain Field; Chattanooga, TN	W 32–12	
October 19	at Sewanee	Hardee Field; Sewanee, TN	L 0–27	
October 26	at Central University	Cheek Field; Danville, KY	L 6–7	
November 1	Maryville (TN)	Chamberlain Field; Chattanooga, TN	W 34–6	
November 9	11th Cavalry	Chamberlain Field; Chattanooga, TN	L 7–14	
November 16	Transylvania	Chamberlain Field; Chattanooga, TN	W 52–2	
November 28	11th Cavalry	Chamberlain Field; Chattanooga, TN	W 13–9	
