= 1912 Davidson football team =

American college football season

1912 Davidson football
- Conference: Independent
- Record: 3–4
- Head coach: W. T. Cook (1st season)
- Home stadium: Sprunt Athletic Field

1912 Southern college football independents records
	Conf.			Overall
Team	W	L	T	W		L		T
Middle Tennessee State Normal		–		1	–	0	–	0
Texas		–		7	–	1	–	0
VMI		–		7	–	1	–	0
Maryland		–		6	–	1	–	1
Oklahoma A&M		–		5	–	2	–	0
Stetson		–		5	–	2	–	0
Livingstone		–		3	–	1	–	1
Louisville		–		3	–	1	–	0
Mississippi Normal		–		2	–	1	–	0
South Carolina		–		5	–	2	–	1
Navy		–		6	–	3	–	0
Spring Hill		–		4	–	2	–	0
West Virginia		–		6	–	3	–	0
Oklahoma		–		5	–	4	–	0
Rice		–		3	–	2	–	0
Chattanooga		–		4	–	4	–	0
Morris Harvey		–		2	–	2	–	0
Sam Houston Normal		–		2	–	2	–	0
Southwest Texas State		–		3	–	3	–	2
Davidson		–		3	–	4	–	0
Marshall		–		3	–	4	–	0
Southwestern Louisiana Industrial		–		3	–	4	–	0
Tennessee Docs		–		3	–	4	–	0
Arkansas		–		4	–	6	–	0
Baylor		–		3	–	5	–	0
Catholic University		–		3	–	5	–	0
Louisiana Industrial		–		1	–	2	–	1
West Tennessee State Normal		–		1	–	2	–	1
Wake Forest		–		2	–	6	–	0
Kendall		–		1	–	4	–	0
Delaware		–		1	–	6	–	1
Birmingham		–		1	–	6	–	0
Biddle		–		0	–	1	–	0

The 1912 Davidson football team was an American football team that represented the Davidson College as an independent during the 1912 college football season. In their first year under head coach W. T. Cook, the team compiled a 3–4 record.

== Schedule ==
Date	Opponent	Site	Result	Source
September 30	Westminster (PA)	Sprunt Athletic Field; Davidson, NC	W 30–0	
October 5	vs. North Carolina	Wearn Field; Charlotte, NC	L 0–13	
October 19	Mount Pleasant (NC)	Sprunt Athletic Field; Davidson, NC	W 125–0	
October 26	North Carolina A&M	Sprunt Athletic Field; Davidson, NC	L 0–7	
November 2	at Washington and Lee	Wilson Field; Lexington, VA	L 0–54	
November 21	at Stetson	DeLand, FL	L 6–21	
November 28	vs. Wake Forest	Wearn Field; Charlotte, NC	W 13–7	
