= 1912 Arkansas Razorbacks football team =

American college football season

1912 Arkansas Razorbacks football
- Conference: Independent
- Record: 4–6
- Head coach: Hugo Bezdek (5th season)
- Captain: Percy Hinton
- Home stadium: The Hill

1912 Southern college football independents records
| | Conf. | | | Overall |
| Team | W | L | T | W | | L | | T |
|---|---|---|---|---|---|---|---|---|
| Middle Tennessee State Normal | | – | | 1 | – | 0 | – | 0 |
| Texas | | – | | 7 | – | 1 | – | 0 |
| VMI | | – | | 7 | – | 1 | – | 0 |
| Maryland | | – | | 6 | – | 1 | – | 1 |
| Oklahoma A&M | | – | | 5 | – | 2 | – | 0 |
| Stetson | | – | | 5 | – | 2 | – | 0 |
| Livingstone | | – | | 3 | – | 1 | – | 1 |
| Louisville | | – | | 3 | – | 1 | – | 0 |
| Mississippi Normal | | – | | 2 | – | 1 | – | 0 |
| South Carolina | | – | | 5 | – | 2 | – | 1 |
| Navy | | – | | 6 | – | 3 | – | 0 |
| Spring Hill | | – | | 4 | – | 2 | – | 0 |
| West Virginia | | – | | 6 | – | 3 | – | 0 |
| Oklahoma | | – | | 5 | – | 4 | – | 0 |
| Rice | | – | | 3 | – | 2 | – | 0 |
| Chattanooga | | – | | 4 | – | 4 | – | 0 |
| Morris Harvey | | – | | 2 | – | 2 | – | 0 |
| Sam Houston Normal | | – | | 2 | – | 2 | – | 0 |
| Southwest Texas State | | – | | 3 | – | 3 | – | 2 |
| Davidson | | – | | 3 | – | 4 | – | 0 |
| Marshall | | – | | 3 | – | 4 | – | 0 |
| Southwestern Louisiana Industrial | | – | | 3 | – | 4 | – | 0 |
| Tennessee Docs | | – | | 3 | – | 4 | – | 0 |
| Arkansas | | – | | 4 | – | 6 | – | 0 |
| Baylor | | – | | 3 | – | 5 | – | 0 |
| Catholic University | | – | | 3 | – | 5 | – | 0 |
| Louisiana Industrial | | – | | 1 | – | 2 | – | 1 |
| West Tennessee State Normal | | – | | 1 | – | 2 | – | 1 |
| Wake Forest | | – | | 2 | – | 6 | – | 0 |
| Kendall | | – | | 1 | – | 4 | – | 0 |
| Delaware | | – | | 1 | – | 6 | – | 1 |
| Birmingham | | – | | 1 | – | 6 | – | 0 |
| Biddle | | – | | 0 | – | 1 | – | 0 |

The 1912 Arkansas Razorbacks football team represented the University of Arkansas during the 1912 college football season. In their fifth and final year under head coach Hugo Bezdek, the Razorbacks compiled a 4–6 record and were outscored by all opponents by a combined total of 179 to 149. The Razorbacks were blown out in games against Texas A&M (27–0), Wisconsin (64–7), and Texas (48–0). Bezdek left Arkansas after the 1912 season to become head football coach at Oregon, where he was offered more money and a modern gymnasium and athletic field. He was inducted into the College Football Hall of Fame as a coach in 1954.

== Schedule ==
| Date | Time | Opponent | Site | Result | Attendance | Source |
|---|---|---|---|---|---|---|
| October 5 | | Henderson-Brown | The Hill; Fayetteville, AR | W 39–6 | | |
| October 12 | | Hendrix | The Hill; Fayetteville, AR | W 52–0 | | |
| October 19 | | Oklahoma A&M | The Hill; Fayetteville, AR | L 7–13 | | |
| October 26 | | vs. Texas A&M | State Fairgrounds; Dallas, TX (rivalry) | L 0–27 | | |
| October 28 | | at Baylor | Waco, TX | L 0–7 | | |
| November 2 | | Southwestern (TX) | The Hill; Fayetteville, AR | W 25–0 | | |
| November 9 | 2:30 p.m. | at Wisconsin | Randall Field; Madison, WI | L 7–64 | 2,000 | |
| November 16 | | LSU | West End Park; Little Rock, AR (rivalry) | L 6–7 | | |
| November 23 | 2:30 p.m. | at Washington University | Francis Field; St. Louis, MO | W 13–7 | 2,500 | |
| November 28 | | at Texas | Clark Field; Austin, TX (rivalry) | L 0–48 | | |
