= 1912 Morris Harvey football team =

American college football season

1912 Morris Harvey football
- Conference: Independent
- Record: 3–1
- Head coach: Alexander Hogarty (1st season); Skeeter Shelton (3rd season)
- Captain: Edward Wellner

1912 Southern college football independents records
	Conf.			Overall
Team	W	L	T	W		L		T
Middle Tennessee State Normal		–		1	–	0	–	0
Texas		–		7	–	1	–	0
VMI		–		7	–	1	–	0
Maryland		–		6	–	1	–	1
Oklahoma A&M		–		5	–	2	–	0
Stetson		–		5	–	2	–	0
Livingstone		–		3	–	1	–	1
Louisville		–		3	–	1	–	0
Morris Harvey		–		3	–	1	–	0
Mississippi Normal		–		2	–	1	–	0
South Carolina		–		5	–	2	–	1
Navy		–		6	–	3	–	0
Spring Hill		–		4	–	2	–	0
Oklahoma		–		5	–	4	–	0
Rice		–		3	–	2	–	0
Chattanooga		–		4	–	4	–	0
Sam Houston Normal		–		2	–	2	–	0
Southwest Texas State		–		3	–	3	–	2
Davidson		–		3	–	4	–	0
Marshall		–		3	–	4	–	0
Southwestern Louisiana Industrial		–		3	–	4	–	0
Tennessee Docs		–		3	–	4	–	0
Arkansas		–		4	–	6	–	0
Baylor		–		3	–	5	–	0
Catholic University		–		3	–	5	–	0
Louisiana Industrial		–		1	–	2	–	1
West Tennessee State Normal		–		1	–	2	–	1
Wake Forest		–		2	–	6	–	0
Kendall		–		1	–	4	–	0
Delaware		–		1	–	6	–	1
Birmingham		–		1	–	6	–	0
Biddle		–		0	–	1	–	0

The 1912 Morris Harvey football team represented the Morris Harvey College—now known as the University of Charleston–in Charleston, West Virginia during the 1912 college football season. Alexander Hogarty was the team's head coach in October. In November, Skeeter Shelton was coaching the team..

== Schedule ==
Date	Opponent	Site	Result	Source
October 12	at Central University	Cheek Field; Danville, KY	W 53–7	
October 19	at Notre Dame	Cartier Field; Notre Dame, IN	L 0–39	
	Davis & Elkins		W 31–8	
November 9	at Bethany (WV)	Huntington, WV	W 17–6	
