= 1912 Southwest Texas State football team =

American college football season

1912 Southwest Texas State football
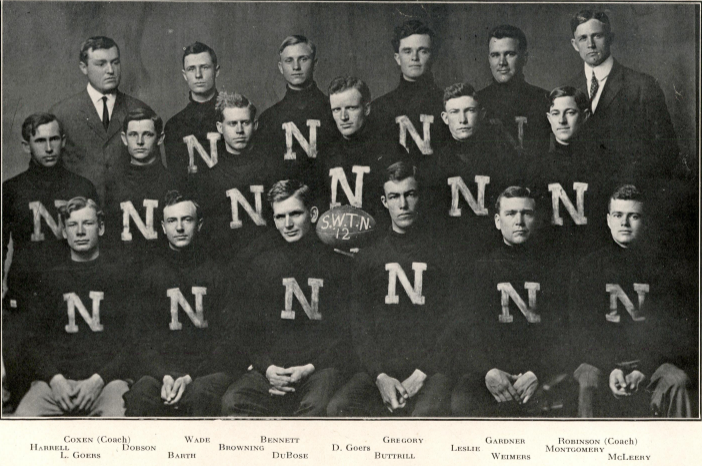
- Conference: Independent
- Record: 3–3–2
- Head coach: James R. Coxen (2nd season)

1912 Southern college football independents records
	Conf.			Overall
Team	W	L	T	W		L		T
Middle Tennessee State Normal		–		1	–	0	–	0
Texas		–		7	–	1	–	0
VMI		–		7	–	1	–	0
Maryland		–		6	–	1	–	1
Oklahoma A&M		–		5	–	2	–	0
Stetson		–		5	–	2	–	0
Livingstone		–		3	–	1	–	1
Louisville		–		3	–	1	–	0
Morris Harvey		–		3	–	1	–	0
Mississippi Normal		–		2	–	1	–	0
South Carolina		–		5	–	2	–	1
Navy		–		6	–	3	–	0
Spring Hill		–		4	–	2	–	0
Oklahoma		–		5	–	4	–	0
Rice		–		3	–	2	–	0
Chattanooga		–		4	–	4	–	0
Sam Houston Normal		–		2	–	2	–	0
Southwest Texas State		–		3	–	3	–	2
Davidson		–		3	–	4	–	0
Marshall		–		3	–	4	–	0
Southwestern Louisiana Industrial		–		3	–	4	–	0
Tennessee Docs		–		3	–	4	–	0
Arkansas		–		4	–	6	–	0
Baylor		–		3	–	5	–	0
Catholic University		–		3	–	5	–	0
Louisiana Industrial		–		1	–	2	–	1
West Tennessee State Normal		–		1	–	2	–	1
Wake Forest		–		2	–	6	–	0
Kendall		–		1	–	4	–	0
Delaware		–		1	–	6	–	1
Birmingham		–		1	–	6	–	0
Biddle		–		0	–	1	–	0

The 1912 Southwest Texas State football team was an American football team that represented Southwest Texas State Normal School—now known as Texas State University–as an independent during the 1912 college football season. The team was led by third-year head coach James R. Coxen and finished the season with a record of 3–3–2.

== Schedule ==
Date	Opponent	Site	Result
	San Marcos High School		T 0–0 (Note: Game not mentioned in the Normal yearbook, but is mentioned in the November 24, 1912 issue of the San Antonio Light newspaper on page 17.)
	San Marcos Baptist Academy	Academy Field	W 7–6
	West Texas Military Academy	San Antonio, TX	W 14–0
	San Antonio High School		W 19–13
	Coronal Institute		L 0–13
	San Marcos Baptist Academy		T 6–6
	San Antonio High School	San Antonio, TX	L 7–36
November 28	St. Edward's		L 0–9
