= 1912 Baylor football team =

American college football season

1912 Baylor football
- Conference: Independent
- Record: 3–5
- Head coach: Ralph Glaze (3rd season)
- Captain: L. L. Cooper
- Home stadium: Carroll Field

1912 Southern college football independents records
	Conf.			Overall
Team	W	L	T	W		L		T
Middle Tennessee State Normal		–		1	–	0	–	0
Texas		–		7	–	1	–	0
VMI		–		7	–	1	–	0
Maryland		–		6	–	1	–	1
Oklahoma A&M		–		5	–	2	–	0
Stetson		–		5	–	2	–	0
Livingstone		–		3	–	1	–	1
Louisville		–		3	–	1	–	0
Mississippi Normal		–		2	–	1	–	0
South Carolina		–		5	–	2	–	1
Navy		–		6	–	3	–	0
Spring Hill		–		4	–	2	–	0
West Virginia		–		6	–	3	–	0
Oklahoma		–		5	–	4	–	0
Rice		–		3	–	2	–	0
Chattanooga		–		4	–	4	–	0
Morris Harvey		–		2	–	2	–	0
Sam Houston Normal		–		2	–	2	–	0
Southwest Texas State		–		3	–	3	–	2
Davidson		–		3	–	4	–	0
Marshall		–		3	–	4	–	0
Southwestern Louisiana Industrial		–		3	–	4	–	0
Tennessee Docs		–		3	–	4	–	0
Arkansas		–		4	–	6	–	0
Baylor		–		3	–	5	–	0
Catholic University		–		3	–	5	–	0
Louisiana Industrial		–		1	–	2	–	1
West Tennessee State Normal		–		1	–	2	–	1
Wake Forest		–		2	–	6	–	0
Kendall		–		1	–	4	–	0
Delaware		–		1	–	6	–	1
Birmingham		–		1	–	6	–	0
Biddle		–		0	–	1	–	0

The 1912 Baylor football team was an American football team that represented Baylor University as an independent during the 1912 college football season. In its third season under head coach Ralph Glaze, the team compiled a 3–5 record and was outscored by a total of 123 to 79.

== Schedule ==
Date	Opponent	Site	Result	Source
October 8	Austin	Carroll Field; Waco, TX	L 6–8	
October 12	Polytechnic (TX)	Carroll Field; Waco, TX	W 12–8	
October 19	at TCU	Morris Park; Fort Worth, TX (rivalry)	L 0–22	
October 28	Arkansas	Carroll Field; Waco, TX	W 6–0	
November 4	Texas	Carroll Field; Waco, TX (rivalry)	L 7–19	
November 12	Southwestern (TX)	Carroll Field; Waco, TX	L 6–13	
November 16	Trinity (TX)	Carroll Field; Waco, TX	W 41–0	
November 28	vs. Texas A&M	Gaston Park; Dallas, TX (rivalry)	L 0–53	
