= 1912 Oklahoma Sooners football team =

American college football season

1912 Oklahoma Sooners football
- Conference: Independent
- Record: 5–4
- Head coach: Bennie Owen (8th season)
- Captain: Glenn Clark
- Home stadium: Boyd Field

1912 Southern college football independents records
| | Conf. | | | Overall |
| Team | W | L | T | W | | L | | T |
|---|---|---|---|---|---|---|---|---|
| Middle Tennessee State Normal | | – | | 1 | – | 0 | – | 0 |
| Texas | | – | | 7 | – | 1 | – | 0 |
| VMI | | – | | 7 | – | 1 | – | 0 |
| Maryland | | – | | 6 | – | 1 | – | 1 |
| Oklahoma A&M | | – | | 5 | – | 2 | – | 0 |
| Stetson | | – | | 5 | – | 2 | – | 0 |
| Livingstone | | – | | 3 | – | 1 | – | 1 |
| Louisville | | – | | 3 | – | 1 | – | 0 |
| Mississippi Normal | | – | | 2 | – | 1 | – | 0 |
| South Carolina | | – | | 5 | – | 2 | – | 1 |
| Navy | | – | | 6 | – | 3 | – | 0 |
| Spring Hill | | – | | 4 | – | 2 | – | 0 |
| West Virginia | | – | | 6 | – | 3 | – | 0 |
| Oklahoma | | – | | 5 | – | 4 | – | 0 |
| Rice | | – | | 3 | – | 2 | – | 0 |
| Chattanooga | | – | | 4 | – | 4 | – | 0 |
| Morris Harvey | | – | | 2 | – | 2 | – | 0 |
| Sam Houston Normal | | – | | 2 | – | 2 | – | 0 |
| Southwest Texas State | | – | | 3 | – | 3 | – | 2 |
| Davidson | | – | | 3 | – | 4 | – | 0 |
| Marshall | | – | | 3 | – | 4 | – | 0 |
| Southwestern Louisiana Industrial | | – | | 3 | – | 4 | – | 0 |
| Tennessee Docs | | – | | 3 | – | 4 | – | 0 |
| Arkansas | | – | | 4 | – | 6 | – | 0 |
| Baylor | | – | | 3 | – | 5 | – | 0 |
| Catholic University | | – | | 3 | – | 5 | – | 0 |
| Louisiana Industrial | | – | | 1 | – | 2 | – | 1 |
| West Tennessee State Normal | | – | | 1 | – | 2 | – | 1 |
| Wake Forest | | – | | 2 | – | 6 | – | 0 |
| Kendall | | – | | 1 | – | 4 | – | 0 |
| Delaware | | – | | 1 | – | 6 | – | 1 |
| Birmingham | | – | | 1 | – | 6 | – | 0 |
| Biddle | | – | | 0 | – | 1 | – | 0 |

The 1912 Oklahoma Sooners football team represented the University of Oklahoma as an independent during the 1912 college football season. In their eighth year under head coach Bennie Owen, the Sooners compiled a 5–4 record, and outscored their opponents by a combined total of 197 to 80.

== Schedule ==
| Date | Time | Opponent | Site | Result | Attendance | Source |
|---|---|---|---|---|---|---|
| October 5 | | at Kingfisher | Kingfisher, OK | W 40–0 | | |
| October 11 | | Central State Normal | Boyd Field; Norman, OK | W 87–0 | | |
| October 19 | | vs. Texas | Gaston Field; Dallas, TX (rivalry) | W 21–6 | | |
| October 25 | | Missouri | Boyd Field; Norman, OK (rivalry) | L 0–14 | | |
| November 2 | | at Kansas | McCook Field; Lawrence, KS | W 6–5 | | |
| November 11 | 3:15 p.m. | at Texas A&M | Houston, TX | L 6–28 | 6,000 | |
| November 16 | | Oklahoma A&M | Boyd Field; Norman, OK (rivalry) | W 16–0 | | |
| November 23 | | at Nebraska | Nebraska Field; Lincoln, NE (rivalry) | L 9–13 | | |
| November 28 | | vs. Colorado | Broadway Park; Denver, CO | L 12–14 | | |
