= 1912 VMI Keydets football team =

American college football season

1912 VMI Keydets football
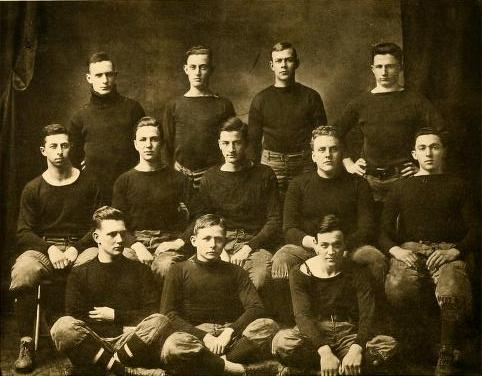
- Conference: Independent
- Record: 7–1
- Head coach: Alpha Brumage (2nd season)

1912 Southern college football independents records
	Conf.			Overall
Team	W	L	T	W		L		T
Middle Tennessee State Normal		–		1	–	0	–	0
Texas		–		7	–	1	–	0
VMI		–		7	–	1	–	0
Maryland		–		6	–	1	–	1
Oklahoma A&M		–		5	–	2	–	0
Stetson		–		5	–	2	–	0
Livingstone		–		3	–	1	–	1
Louisville		–		3	–	1	–	0
Mississippi Normal		–		2	–	1	–	0
South Carolina		–		5	–	2	–	1
Navy		–		6	–	3	–	0
Spring Hill		–		4	–	2	–	0
West Virginia		–		6	–	3	–	0
Oklahoma		–		5	–	4	–	0
Rice		–		3	–	2	–	0
Chattanooga		–		4	–	4	–	0
Morris Harvey		–		2	–	2	–	0
Sam Houston Normal		–		2	–	2	–	0
Southwest Texas State		–		3	–	3	–	2
Davidson		–		3	–	4	–	0
Marshall		–		3	–	4	–	0
Southwestern Louisiana Industrial		–		3	–	4	–	0
Tennessee Docs		–		3	–	4	–	0
Arkansas		–		4	–	6	–	0
Baylor		–		3	–	5	–	0
Catholic University		–		3	–	5	–	0
Louisiana Industrial		–		1	–	2	–	1
West Tennessee State Normal		–		1	–	2	–	1
Wake Forest		–		2	–	6	–	0
Kendall		–		1	–	4	–	0
Delaware		–		1	–	6	–	1
Birmingham		–		1	–	6	–	0
Biddle		–		0	–	1	–	0

The 1912 VMI Keydets football team represented the Virginia Military Institute (VMI) in their 22nd season of organized football. The Keydets again went 7–1 under head coach Alpha Brummage.

== Schedule ==
Date	Opponent	Site	Result	Source
September 28	Hampden–Sydney	VMI Parade Ground; Lexington, VA	W 27–0	
October 5	Richmond Medical College	VMI Parade Ground; Lexington, VA	W 36–0	
October 12	Gallaudet	VMI Parade Ground; Lexington, VA	W 26–6	
October 19	at Virginia	Madison Hall Field; Charlottesville, VA	W 19–0	
November 2	at Kentucky State College	Stoll Field; Lexington, KY	W 3–2	
November 9	St. John's (MD)	VMI Parade Ground; Lexington, VA	L 3–25	
November 16	Roanoke	VMI Parade Ground; Lexington, VA	W 34–3	
November 28	at Johns Hopkins	Homewood Field; Baltimore, MD	W 21–0	
