= 1912 Marshall Thundering Herd football team =

American college football season

1912 Marshall Thundering Herd football
- Conference: Independent
- Record: 3–4
- Head coach: Boyd Chambers (4th season)
- Captain: Fred Ollom
- Home stadium: Central Field

1912 Southern college football independents records
	Conf.			Overall
Team	W	L	T	W		L		T
Middle Tennessee State Normal		–		1	–	0	–	0
Texas		–		7	–	1	–	0
VMI		–		7	–	1	–	0
Maryland		–		6	–	1	–	1
Oklahoma A&M		–		5	–	2	–	0
Stetson		–		5	–	2	–	0
Livingstone		–		3	–	1	–	1
Louisville		–		3	–	1	–	0
Morris Harvey		–		3	–	1	–	0
Mississippi Normal		–		2	–	1	–	0
South Carolina		–		5	–	2	–	1
Navy		–		6	–	3	–	0
Spring Hill		–		4	–	2	–	0
Oklahoma		–		5	–	4	–	0
Rice		–		3	–	2	–	0
Chattanooga		–		4	–	4	–	0
Sam Houston Normal		–		2	–	2	–	0
Southwest Texas State		–		3	–	3	–	2
Davidson		–		3	–	4	–	0
Marshall		–		3	–	4	–	0
Southwestern Louisiana Industrial		–		3	–	4	–	0
Tennessee Docs		–		3	–	4	–	0
Arkansas		–		4	–	6	–	0
Baylor		–		3	–	5	–	0
Catholic University		–		3	–	5	–	0
Louisiana Industrial		–		1	–	2	–	1
West Tennessee State Normal		–		1	–	2	–	1
Wake Forest		–		2	–	6	–	0
Kendall		–		1	–	4	–	0
Delaware		–		1	–	6	–	1
Birmingham		–		1	–	6	–	0
Biddle		–		0	–	1	–	0

The 1912 Marshall Thundering Herd football team represented Marshall College (now Marshall University) as an independent during the 1912 college football season. Marshall posted a 3–4 record, outscoring its opposition 197–94. Home games were played on a campus field called "Central Field" which is presently Campus Commons.

== Schedule ==
Date	Opponent	Site	Result	Source
September 28	Ironton High School	Central Field; Huntington, WV	W 46–0	
October 5	at Kentucky State College	Stoll Field; Lexington, KY	L 6–13	
October 19	Transylvania	Central Field; Huntington, WV	W 87–0	
October 26	Marietta	Central Field; Huntington, WV	L 0–14	
November 9	Wheeling STAATS	Central Field; Huntington, WV	L 6–8	
November 16	at West Virginia Wesleyan	Buckhannon, WV	L 0–59	
November 28	Muskingum^{†}	Central Field; Huntington, WV	W 52–0	
^{†}Homecoming
