= 1912 Livingstone football team =

American college football season

1912 Livingstone football
- Conference: Independent
- Record: 3–1–1
- Head coach: Benjamin Butler Church (1st season)

1912 Southern college football independents records
	Conf.			Overall
Team	W	L	T	W		L		T
Middle Tennessee State Normal		–		1	–	0	–	0
Texas		–		7	–	1	–	0
VMI		–		7	–	1	–	0
Maryland		–		6	–	1	–	1
Oklahoma A&M		–		5	–	2	–	0
Stetson		–		5	–	2	–	0
Livingstone		–		3	–	1	–	1
Louisville		–		3	–	1	–	0
Mississippi Normal		–		2	–	1	–	0
South Carolina		–		5	–	2	–	1
Navy		–		6	–	3	–	0
Spring Hill		–		4	–	2	–	0
West Virginia		–		6	–	3	–	0
Oklahoma		–		5	–	4	–	0
Rice		–		3	–	2	–	0
Chattanooga		–		4	–	4	–	0
Morris Harvey		–		2	–	2	–	0
Sam Houston Normal		–		2	–	2	–	0
Southwest Texas State		–		3	–	3	–	2
Davidson		–		3	–	4	–	0
Marshall		–		3	–	4	–	0
Southwestern Louisiana Industrial		–		3	–	4	–	0
Tennessee Docs		–		3	–	4	–	0
Arkansas		–		4	–	6	–	0
Baylor		–		3	–	5	–	0
Catholic University		–		3	–	5	–	0
Louisiana Industrial		–		1	–	2	–	1
West Tennessee State Normal		–		1	–	2	–	1
Wake Forest		–		2	–	6	–	0
Kendall		–		1	–	4	–	0
Delaware		–		1	–	6	–	1
Birmingham		–		1	–	6	–	0
Biddle		–		0	–	1	–	0

The 1912 Livingstone football team represented Livingstone College in the 1912 college football season as an independent. Led by coach Benjamin Butler Church in his first year, Livingstone compiled a 3–1–1 record, shutting out three opponents.

== Schedule ==
Date	Time	Opponent	Site	Result	Source
		North Carolina A&T		W 13–0	
November 1		Shaw	Salisbury, NC	W 12–0	
		Claflin		T 0–0	
November 18		Howard	Salisbury, NC	L 0–25	
November 28	11:00 a.m.	at Biddle	Wearn Athletic Park Field; Charlotte, NC	W 13–2	
