= Ronald Slay =

Ronald Slay may refer to:

- Ron Slay (born 1981), American basketball player
- Ronald J. Slay (1890–1948), American college football, college basketball, and college baseball coach
