= James R. Coxen =

American football coach and educator

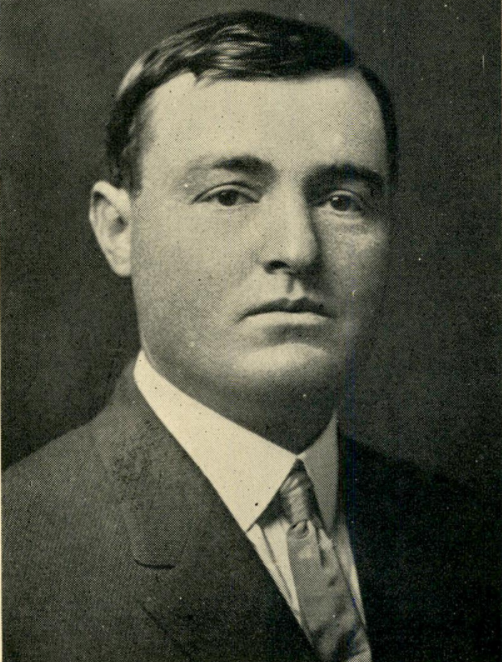
- Coxen pictured in The Pedagog 1914, Southwest Texas State yearbook

Biographical details
- Born: February 12, 1884; Eskridge, Kansas, U.S.
- Died: July 22, 1974 (aged 90); Honolulu, Hawaii, U.S.

Coaching career (HC unless noted)
- 1910–1912: Southwest Texas State

Head coaching record
- Overall: 4–10–2

James Reason Coxen (February 12, 1884 – June 22, 1974) was an American college football coach and educator. He served as the head football coach at Southwest Texas State Normal School—now known as Texas State University–from 1910 to 1912, compiling a record of 4–10–2.

Coxen was born in Eskridge, Kansas. He graduated from Kansas State Agricultural College—now known as Kansas State University—in 1907. Coxen married Anna Vance on May 30, 1912, in Pasadena, California. He was appointed director of vocational work for the Territory of Hawaii in 1925 and held a similar position in Wyoming before that appointment.

Coxen served as a lieutenant commander in the United States Navy during World War II. He died on June 22, 1974, at Queen's Hospital in Honolulu.

== Head coaching record ==
=== College football ===
| Year | Team | Overall | Conference | Standing | Bowl/playoffs |
|---|---|---|---|---|---|
Southwest Texas State (Independent) (1910–1912)
| 1910 | Southwest Texas State | 0–4 | | | |
| 1911 | Southwest Texas State | 1–3 | | | |
| 1912 | Southwest Texas State | 3–3–2 | | | |
| Southwest Texas State: | | 4–10–2 | | | |
| Total: | | 4–10–2 | | | |
