= W. T. Cook =

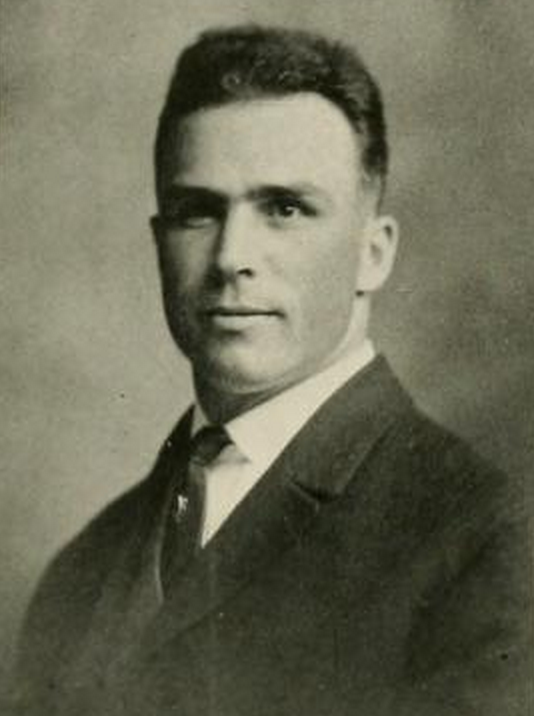
- Cook pictured in Quips and Cranks 1913, Davidson yearbook

Biographical details
- Born: January 1884; Peru, Illinois, U.S.
- Died: 1970 (aged 85–86); Connecticut, U.S.
- Education: Iowa State University; Springfield College

Coaching career (HC unless noted)

Football
- 1912–1913: Davidson

Basketball
- 1912–1913: Davidson

Baseball
- 1913–1914: Davidson

Head coaching record
- Overall: 5–9 (football); 0–1 (basketball); 9–20 (baseball)

William Thomas Cook (January 1884 – 1970) was an American college sports coach. He was Davidson College's head football, men's basketball, baseball, and track and field coaches in the early 1900s. He compiled overall records of 5–9 (football), 0–1 (basketball), and 9–20 (baseball).

Cook, a native of Peru, Illinois, played on baseball and football teams in Cedar Rapids, Iowa in his early life. He eventually attended Iowa State University, playing on the school's athletic teams. Some time shortly thereafter, Cook relocated to Massachusetts where he played on a baseball team in Springfield, served as physical director at Allan's School and coached a football team in Fitchburg. After graduating from the Springfield Y.M.C.A. Training School in 1911, Cook relocated, this time to Pennsylvania to serve as physical director at another school.

== Head coaching record ==
=== Football ===
Year	Team	Overall	Conference	Standing	Bowl/playoffs
Davidson (Independent) (1912–1913)
1912	Davidson	3–4			
1913	Davidson	2–5			
Davidson:		5–9			
Total:		5–9			

=== Basketball ===
Record table
Season	Team	Overall	Conference	Standing	Postseason
Davidson (Independent) (1912–1913)
1912–13	Davidson	0–1			
Davidson:		0–1			
Total:		0–1			

=== Baseball ===
Record table
Season	Team	Overall	Conference	Standing	Postseason
Davidson (Independent) (1913–1914)
1913	Davidson	4–11			
1914	Davidson	5–9			
Davidson:		9–20			
Total:		9–20			
