= Harvey Allen (coach) =

American football player and coach

Biographical details
- Born: September 20, 1888; Bates County, Missouri, U.S.
- Died: February 26, 1957 (aged 68); Los Angeles, California, U.S.
- Education: Kendall (MA)

Playing career

Football
- 1905: Southwestern Oklahoma State

Coaching career (HC unless noted)

Football
- 1912: Kendall

Basketball
- 1913–1914: Kendall

Head coaching record
- Overall: 1–4 (.200) (football) 3–1 (.750) (basketball)

Harvey Lemuel Allen (September 20, 1888 – February 16, 1957) was an American football player and coach and college president. He served as the head football and basketball coach at Kendall Institute—now known as the University of Tulsa in 1912. Allen later served as the president of the University of Findlay in Ohio and in 1929 as the Chancellor at Kendall.

== Head coaching record ==
=== Football ===
Year	Team	Overall	Conference	Standing	Bowl/playoffs
Kendall Orange and Black (Independent) (1912)
1912	Kendall	1–4			
Kendall:		1–4			
Total:		1–4			

=== Basketball ===
Record table
Season	Team	Overall	Conference	Standing	Postseason
Kendall Orange and Black (Independent) (1913–1914)
1913–14	Kendall	3–2			
Kendall:		3–2 (.600)			
Total:		3–2 (.600)			
