= Bill Hollander =

American sports coach

Biographical details
- Born: December 9, 1891; York, Pennsylvania, U.S.
- Died: February 22, 1947 (aged 55); San Francisco, California, U.S.

Playing career

Basketball
- 1910–1912: Georgetown

Baseball
- c. 1910: Georgetown
- 1911: Scranton Miners
- 1914: Montgomery Rebels
- 1915: Toronto Maple Leafs (IL)
- 1915: Albany Senators
- 1916–1917: Fort Worth Panthers
- 1917: Fort Smith Twins
- 1918: Oakland Oaks
- 1920: Sacramento Senators
- Positions: Third baseman, outfielder (baseball)

Coaching career (HC unless noted)

Football
- 1916: Stetson
- 1920: Saint Mary's

Basketball
- 1915–1917: Stetson
- 1918–1920: California

Basketball
- 1916–1917: Stetson

Head coaching record
- Overall: 3–4 (football); 40–19 (basketball); 21–10 (baseball)

William H. "Dutch" Hollander (December 9, 1891 – February 22, 1947) was an American football, basketball, and baseball coach and minor league baseball player. He served as the head football coach at Saint Mary's College of California in 1920, compiling a record of 0–3. Hollander was the head basketball coach at Stetson University in Deland, Florida from 1915 to 1917 and the University of California, Berkeley from 1918 to 1920, amassing a career college basketball coaching record of 40–19. He was also the head baseball coach at Stetson from 1916 to 1917, tallying a mark of 21–10.

Holland died of a heart attack, on February 22, 1947, in San Francisco, California.

== Head coaching record ==
=== Football ===
Year	Team	Overall	Conference	Standing	Bowl/playoffs
Stetson Hatters (Independent) (1916)
1916	Stetson	3–1			
Stetson:		3–1			
Saint Mary's Saints (Independent) (1920)
1920	Saint Mary's	0–3			
Saint Mary's:		0–3			
Total:		3–4			
