= 1912 Cincinnati football team =

American college football season

1912 Cincinnati football
- Conference: Ohio Athletic Conference
- Record: 3–4–1 (0–3–1 OAC)
- Head coach: Lowell Dana (1st season)
- Captain: Robert Heuck
- Home stadium: Carson Field

1912 Ohio Athletic Conference football standings
	Conf.					Overall
Team	W		L		T	W		L		T
Ohio State $	5	–	0	–	0	6	–	3	–	0
Oberlin	5	–	1	–	0	7	–	1	–	0
Western Reserve	4	–	1	–	0	5	–	4	–	0
Denison	4	–	1	–	1	6	–	1	–	1
Miami (OH)	1	–	1	–	2	3	–	3	–	2
Case	3	–	3	–	0	4	–	5	–	0
Wittenberg	2	–	3	–	1	6	–	3	–	1
Kenyon	2	–	3	–	1	4	–	3	–	1
Ohio Wesleyan	2	–	5	–	0	3	–	6	–	0
Wooster	1	–	4	–	1	1	–	4	–	1
Cincinnati	0	–	3	–	1	3	–	4	–	1
Ohio	0	–	4	–	1	1	–	7	–	1
$ – Conference champion

The 1912 Cincinnati football team was an American football team that represented the University of Cincinnati as a member of the Ohio Athletic Conference during the 1912 college football season. In their first season under head coach Lowell Dana, the team compiled a 3–4–1 record. Robert Heuck was the team captain. The team played home games at Carson Field in Cincinnati.

== Schedule ==
Date	Opponent	Site	Result	Source
October 5	Transylvania*	Carson Field; Cincinnati, OH	W 124–0	
October 12	Earlham*	Carson Field; Cincinnati, OH	W 21–0	
October 19	Kentucky State College*	Carson Field; Cincinnati, OH	L 13–19	
October 26	at Ohio State	Ohio Field; Columbus, OH	L 7–45	
November 2	Otterbein*	Carson Field; Cincinnati, OH	W 39–7	
November 9	at Denison	Granville, OH	L 13–31	
November 16	Kenyon	Carson Field; Cincinnati, OH	L 13–22	
November 28	Miami (OH)	Carson Field; Cincinnati, OH (Victory Bell)	T 21–21	
*Non-conference game
