= Ronald J. Slay =

American football, basketball, and baseball coach

Biographical details
- Born: November 15, 1890; Purvis, Mississippi, U.S.
- Died: September 18, 1948 (aged 57); New York, New York, U.S.

Coaching career (HC unless noted)

Football
- 1912: Mississippi Normal

Basketball
- 1912–1913: Mississippi Normal
- 1918–1920: Mississippi Normal

Baseball
- 1914–1916: Mississippi Normal
- 1919: Mississippi Normal

Administrative career (AD unless noted)
- 1912–1921: Mississippi Normal

Head coaching record
- Overall: 2–1 (football); 9–7 (basketball); 4–5 (baseball)

Ronald J. Slay (November 15, 1890 – September 18, 1948) was an American college football, college basketball, and college baseball coach, athletics administrator, and educator. A teacher of science and modern language, he was appointed by the faculty of Mississippi Normal College—now known as the University of Southern Mississippi—in Hattiesburg, Mississippi as school's first head football coach in 1912. He served in that capacity for one season, compiling a record of 2–1. Slay was also the head basketball coach at Mississippi Normal in 1912–13 and from 1918 to 1920, tallying a mark of 9–7, and the school's head baseball coach from 1914 to 1916 and in 1919, tallying a mark 4–5.

== Head coaching record ==
=== Football ===
Year	Team	Overall	Conference	Standing	Bowl/playoffs
Mississippi Normal Normalites (Independent) (1912)
1912	Mississippi Normal	2–1			
Mississippi Normal:		2–1			
Total:		2–1			
