= 1912 Ohio Green and White football team =

American college football season

1912 Ohio Green and White football
- Conference: Independent
- Record: 1–7–1
- Head coach: Arthur Hinaman (2nd season)

1912 Ohio Athletic Conference football standings
	Conf.					Overall
Team	W		L		T	W		L		T
Ohio State $	5	–	0	–	0	6	–	3	–	0
Oberlin	5	–	1	–	0	7	–	1	–	0
Western Reserve	4	–	1	–	0	5	–	4	–	0
Denison	4	–	1	–	1	6	–	1	–	1
Miami (OH)	1	–	1	–	2	3	–	3	–	2
Case	3	–	3	–	0	4	–	5	–	0
Wittenberg	2	–	3	–	1	6	–	3	–	1
Kenyon	2	–	3	–	1	4	–	3	–	1
Ohio Wesleyan	2	–	5	–	0	3	–	6	–	0
Wooster	1	–	4	–	1	1	–	4	–	1
Cincinnati	0	–	3	–	1	3	–	4	–	1
Ohio	0	–	4	–	1	1	–	7	–	1
$ – Conference champion

The 1912 Ohio Green and White football team represented Ohio University as an independent during the 1912 college football season. Led by second-year head coach Arthur Hinaman, the Green and White compiled a record of 1–7–1.

== Schedule ==
Date	Opponent	Site	Result
October 5	Kenyon	Athens, OH	T 7–7
October 12	at Ohio Wesleyan	Delaware, OH	L 6–8
October 19	Wittenberg	Athens, OH	L 12–27
October 26	at West Virginia	Morgantown, WV	L 0–6
November 2	at Buchtel	Akron, OH	L 0–27
November 9	at Miami (OH)	Miami Field; Oxford, OH (rivalry)	L 6–18
November 16	Otterbein	Athens, OH	W 10–7
November 23	Western Reserve	Athens, OH	L 7–41
November 28	at Marietta	Marietta, OH	L 0–27
