= 1912 Geneva Covenanters football team =

American college football season

1912 Geneva Covenanters football
- Conference: Western Pennsylvania and West Virginia Intercollegiate Athletic Association
- Record: 3–4 (1–2 W PA & WV)
- Head coach: Graydon Long (1st season)

1912 Western Pennsylvania and West Virginia Intercollegiate Athletic Association football standings
	Conf.					Overall
Team	W		L		T	W		L		T
Grove City $	3	–	0	–	1	6	–	2	–	1
West Virginia	3	–	0	–	0	6	–	3	–	0
Geneva	1	–	2	–	0	3	–	4	–	0
Westminster (PA)	1	–	3	–	0	3	–	6	–	0
Allegheny	1	–	3	–	0	1	–	5	–	1
Carnegie Tech	0	–	1	–	1	3	–	4	–	1
$ – Conference champion

The 1912 Geneva Covenanters football team was an American football team that represented Geneva College as a member of the Western Pennsylvania and West Virginia Intercollegiate Athletic Association during the 1912 college football season. Led by Graydon Long in his first and only year as head coach, the Covenanters compiled an overall record of 3–4 with a mark of 1–2 in conference play, placing third in the Western Pennsylvania and West Virginia league.

== Schedule ==
Date	Opponent	Site	Result	Attendance	Source
September 28	at Washington & Jefferson*	Washington, PA	L 7–52	3,000	
October 5	Thiel*	Beaver Falls, PA	W 36–7		
October 12	at Grove City	Grove City, PA	Cancelled		
October 19	at West Virginia	Morgantown, WV	L 13–20		
October 26	Allegheny	Beaver Falls, PA	W 17–6		
November 2	Mount Union*	Beaver Falls, PA	L 0–21		
November 8	at Muskingum*	New Concord, OH	W 21–3		
November 16	Grove City	Beaver Falls, PA	L 0–13		
*Non-conference game
