= 1912 TCU football team =

American college football season

1912 TCU football
- Conference: Texas Intercollegiate Athletic Association
- Record: 8–1 (3–0 TIAA)
- Head coach: Willis T. Stewart (1st season)
- Captain: Bryan F. Ware
- Home stadium: Morris Park

The 1912 TCU football team represented Texas Christian University (TCU) as a member of the Texas Intercollegiate Athletic Association (TIAA) during the 1912 college football season. The Horned Frogs finished the season 8–1 overall. Led by Willis T. Stewart in his first and only year as head coach, TCU compiled an overall record of 8–1. They played their home games at Morris Park in Fort Worth, Texas. The team's captain was Bryan F. Ware, who played guard.

== Schedule ==
Date	Time	Opponent	Site	Result	Attendance	Source
September 28		at Britten Training School*	Cisco, TX	W 16–0		
October 5		at Texas*	Clark Field; Austin, TX (rivalry)	L 10–30	2,500	
October 12		at Southwestern (TX)	Georgetown, TX	W 20–0		
October 19		Baylor*	Morris Park; Fort Worth, TX (rivalry)	W 22–0		
October 24		vs. Austin	State Fair grounds; Dallas, TX	W 7–0		
October 29	3:30 p.m.	Polytechnic (TX)*	Morris Park; Fort Worth, TX	W 33–3		
November 9	3:30 p.m.	Howard Payne	Morris Park; Fort Worth, TX	W 53–0		
November 20		at Trinity (TX)*	Waxahachie, TX	W 48–13		
November 28		Polytechnic (TX)*	Morris Park; Fort Worth, TX	W 21–7	2,000	
*Non-conference game
