= 1912 Miami Redskins football team =

American college football season

1912 Miami Redskins football
- Conference: Ohio Athletic Conference
- Record: 3–3–2 (1–1–2 OAC)
- Head coach: James C. Donnelly (1st season)
- Home stadium: Miami Field

1912 Ohio Athletic Conference football standings
	Conf.					Overall
Team	W		L		T	W		L		T
Ohio State $	5	–	0	–	0	6	–	3	–	0
Oberlin	5	–	1	–	0	7	–	1	–	0
Western Reserve	4	–	1	–	0	5	–	4	–	0
Denison	4	–	1	–	1	6	–	1	–	1
Miami (OH)	1	–	1	–	2	3	–	3	–	2
Case	3	–	3	–	0	4	–	5	–	0
Wittenberg	2	–	3	–	1	6	–	3	–	1
Kenyon	2	–	3	–	1	4	–	3	–	1
Ohio Wesleyan	2	–	5	–	0	3	–	6	–	0
Wooster	1	–	4	–	1	1	–	4	–	1
Cincinnati	0	–	3	–	1	3	–	4	–	1
Ohio	0	–	4	–	1	1	–	7	–	1
$ – Conference champion

The 1912 Miami Redskins football team was an American football team that represented Miami University as a member of the Ohio Athletic Conference (OAC) during the 1912 college football season. Led by coach James C. Donnelly in his first year, Miami compiled a 3–3–2 record. Donnelly was acting professor of physical education at the school.

== Schedule ==
Date	Opponent	Site	Result	Source
September 28	Wilmington (OH)	Oxford, OH	W 30–0	
October 5	at Wittenberg	Springfield, OH	T 0–0	
October 12	at Kentucky	Stoll Field; Lexington, KY	W 13–8	
October 26	at Saint Louis	St. Louis, MO	L 0–35	
November 2	at DePauw	Greencastle, IN	L 0–11	
November 9	Ohio	Oxford, OH (rivalry)	W 18–6	
November 16	Denison	Oxford, OH	L 0–13	
November 28	Cincinnati	Oxford, OH (Victory Bell)	T 21–21	
