= 1912 Ohio State Buckeyes football team =

American college football season

1912 Ohio State Buckeyes football

OAC champion
- Conference: Ohio Athletic Conference
- Record: 6–3 (5–0 OAC)
- Head coach: John R. Richards (1st season)
- Home stadium: Ohio Field

1912 Ohio Athletic Conference football standings
	Conf.					Overall
Team	W		L		T	W		L		T
Ohio State $	5	–	0	–	0	6	–	3	–	0
Oberlin	5	–	1	–	0	7	–	1	–	0
Western Reserve	4	–	1	–	0	5	–	4	–	0
Denison	4	–	1	–	1	6	–	1	–	1
Miami (OH)	1	–	1	–	2	3	–	3	–	2
Case	3	–	3	–	0	4	–	5	–	0
Wittenberg	2	–	3	–	1	6	–	3	–	1
Kenyon	2	–	3	–	1	4	–	3	–	1
Ohio Wesleyan	2	–	5	–	0	3	–	6	–	0
Wooster	1	–	4	–	1	1	–	4	–	1
Cincinnati	0	–	3	–	1	3	–	4	–	1
Ohio	0	–	4	–	1	1	–	7	–	1
$ – Conference champion

The 1912 Ohio State Buckeyes football team represented Ohio State University in the 1912 college football season. 1912 was the year that Ohio State was accepted into the Western Conference, now known as the Big Ten Conference, where they would begin competition in 1913.

1912 would also be the first of several games between Ohio State and Penn State, as well as Ohio State against Michigan State, who was known as Michigan Agricultural at the time. Michigan State would join the Big Ten Conference in 1953 and Penn State would follow in 1993.

== Schedule ==
Date	Opponent	Site	Result	Attendance	Source
October 5	at Otterbein*	Westerville, OH	W 55–0		
October 12	Denison	Ohio Field; Columbus, OH	W 34–0		
October 19	Michigan*	Ohio Field; Columbus, OH (rivalry)	L 0–14	10,000	
October 26	Cincinnati	Ohio Field; Columbus, OH	W 45–7		
November 2	at Case	Van Horn Field; Cleveland, OH	W 31–6		
November 9	Oberlin	Ohio Field; Columbus, OH	W 23–17		
November 16	Penn State*	Ohio Field; Columbus, OH (rivalry)	L 0–37	3,500	
November 23	at Ohio Wesleyan	Delaware, OH	W 36–6		
November 28	Michigan Agricultural*	Ohio Field; Columbus, OH	L 20–35		
*Non-conference game

== Lettermen ==
These are the Ohio State University lettermen of the 1912 season.

- Donald Barricklow
- Brooklyn Bridge
- Maurice Briggs
- Paul Carroll
- Boyd Cherry
- Samuel Funkhauser
- J.R. Geib
- W.I. Geissman
- Campbell Graf
- Watt Hobt
- Arthur Keifer
- Earl Maxwell
- James McClure
- Edward Morrisey
- Robert Pavey
- Arthur Raymond
- Lee Ryan
- Ralph Shafor
- Charles Snyder
- Byron Stover
- George Trautman
- Grant Ward
