= 1912 college football season =

American college football season

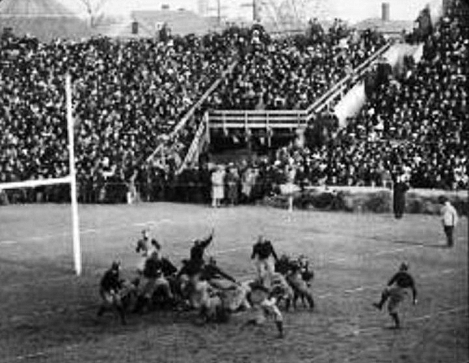
- Charles Brickley's drop kick to defeat Dartmouth
- Champion: Harvard

The 1912 college football season was the first season of the modern era of college football, as the NCAA implemented changes to increase scoring:

- Teams were given 4 downs instead of 3 downs to gain ten yards
- The value of a touchdown was increased from 5 points to 6 points
- The length of the playing field was reduced from 110 yards to 100 yards, and end zones of ten yards were added
- Kickoff was made from the 40 yard line rather than at midfield.

At the end of the season, Harvard was named the year's champion by The New York Times.

== Conference and program changes ==
=== Conference changes ===
- Five conferences began play in 1912:
  - Central Intercollegiate Athletics Association – an active NCAA Division II conference
  - Little Five Conference – active through the 1917 season
  - Louisiana Intercollegiate Athletic Association – active through the 1925 season
  - Missouri Intercollegiate Athletic Association – an active NCAA Division II conference; now known as the Mid-America Intercollegiate Athletics Association
  - South Atlantic Intercollegiate Athletic Association – active through the 1921 season

=== Membership changes ===
School	1911 Conference	1912 Conference
Florida Gators	Independent	SIAA
Georgetown Hoyas	Independent	SAIAA
Johns Hopkins Blue Jays	Independent	SAIAA
Maryland Terrapins	Independent	SAIAA
North Carolina Tar Heels	Independent	SAIAA
North Carolina A&M Aggies	Independent	SAIAA
Rice Owls	Program Established	Independent
Richmond Spiders	Independent	SAIAA
St. John's ?	Independent	SAIAA
Mississippi Normal Golden Eagles	Program Established	Independent
Virginia Cavaliers	Independent	SAIAA
VPI Fighting Gobblers	Independent	SAIAA
Washington & Lee Generals	Independent	SAIAA
West Tennessee Normal Tigers	Program Established	Independent

== September ==
September 21 The first six-point touchdowns were registered in Carlisle's 50–7 win over Albright College, and Rhode Island's 7–0 defeat of Massachusetts Agricultural (now U. Massachusetts-Amherst).

On September 26, Cornell defeated Washington & Jefferson 3–0. Maine defeated Fort McKinley 38–0, Rhode Island State College beat Massachusetts Agricultural 7–0, and Rensselaer Polytechnic Institute (RPI) beat Schenectady's Columbia College, 13–0

September 28 Harvard beat Maine 7–0 and Yale beat Holy Cross 7–0. Princeton beat Stevens 65–0 and three days later, beat Rutgers 41–6. Dartmouth won 26–0 over Bates College. After opening with a 33–0 Wednesday win over Albright, Lehigh beat Delaware 45–0. Swarthmore won at Johns Hopkins 40–6. Carlisle beat Dickinson 35–0, and followed on Wednesday with a 65–0 win over Villanova at Harrisburg, Pennsylvania. Vanderbilt opened with a 105–0 win over visiting Bethel College.

== October ==
October 5 Harvard beat Holy Cross 19–0; Yale beat Syracuse, 21–0; Princeton defeated Lehigh 35–0; and Dartmouth beat Massachusetts 47–0. Carlisle and Washington & Jefferson played a scoreless tie. Penn State beat Carnegie Tech 41–0. Swarthmore won at Lafayette 22–0. Wisconsin opened with a 13–0 win over Lawrence College, Michigan beat Case 34–0, and Chicago beat Indiana 13–0. Texas defeated TCU 30–10. Vanderbilt scored in triple digits again, but was scored upon, in a 100–3 win over Maryville College. Georgia beat Chattanooga 33–0 and Auburn beat Mercer 56–0 in a game at Columbus, Georgia.

October 12 Harvard defeated Williams 26–3, Yale beat Lafayette 16–0, Princeton beat Virginia Tech 31–0, and Dartmouth defeated Vermont 55–0. Penn State beat Washington & Jefferson 30–0, Carlisle won at Syracuse 33–0, Lehigh won at Navy, 14–0 and Swarthmore won at Penn 6–3. Georgetown beat Washington & Lee, 20–0

Vanderbilt beat visiting Rose-Hulman Institute 54–0. Georgia beat The Citadel 33–0. Auburn beat visiting Florida 27–13. Wisconsin beat Northwestern 56–0 and Michigan defeated Michigan State 55–7.

October 19 Yale won at Army, 16–0, Dartmouth won at Williams 21–0, Harvard beat Amherst 46–0, and Princeton beat Syracuse 62–0 and as all four Ivy teams stayed unbeaten. Penn State won at Cornell 29–6, Carlisle won at Pittsburgh 45–8, and Swarthmore won at Annapolis, defeating Navy 21–6, to stay unbeaten. Georgetown won at North Carolina State, 48–0.

Vanderbilt and Georgia met in Atlanta. Vandy handed the Bulldogs their only loss in a 46–0 drubbing. Sewanee beat Chattanooga 27–0, and Auburn defeated Clemson 27–6. After warmup wins over Daniel Baker College and Trinity College, Texas A&M beat Arkansas 27–0 in a game at Dallas. In another game at Dallas, Texas lost to Oklahoma, 21–6. Wisconsin beat Purdue 41–0, Michigan won at Ohio State 14–0, and Chicago defeated Iowa 34–14.

October 26 Princeton (6–0–0) hosted Dartmouth (5–0–0) and won 22–7. Harvard defeated Brown 30–10 and Yale beat Washington & Jefferson, 13–3. Penn State beat visiting Gettysburg College 25–0 and Swarthmore beat Villanova 27–0.

In an intersectional game, Michigan lost at Syracuse 18–7. Vanderbilt beat Ole Miss 24–0 in Nashville, and Sewanee beat Tennessee 33–6 at Chattanooga. In Birmingham, Auburn defeated Mississippi State, 7–0.

Carlisle won at Georgetown, 34–20, followed two days later by a game in Toronto in a 49–7 win against the "Toronto All-Stars". At Philadelphia, Penn State beat Pennsylvania, 22–6. Chicago beat Purdue 7–0. In Columbus, Georgia, Georgia beat Alabama 13–9.

== November ==
November 2 In a matchup of unbeatens, Harvard (5–0–0) hosted Princeton (6–0–0). Charles Brickley of Harvard intercepted two passes and kicked a 47–yard field goal and set up a touchdown for Harvard in its 16–6 win

Carlisle won its 9th game, staying unbeaten with a 34–14 win over Lehigh. Yale defeated Brown 10–0 and Dartmouth beat Amherst 60–0.

Georgetown beat North Carolina 37–10 in a game played in Richmond, Virginia. Swarthmore beat Ursinus 22–0 Michigan narrowly beat visiting South Dakota, 7–6. In Philadelphia, Penn State beat Penn 14–0.

Wisconsin beat Chicago 30–12 and Purdue beat Northwestern 21–6. Georgia and Sewanee played to a 13–13 tie. Vanderbilt stayed unbeaten with a 13–0 win over Virginia. Auburn won at Georgia Tech 27–7. Texas won at Baylor 19–7.

November 9 In an intersectional meeting between the best teams of the East and the South, Harvard hosted Vanderbilt. Going into the contest, both teams had records of 6–0–0, and Vanderbilt had outscored its opponents 342–3. Harvard played all of its substitutes, and scored a touchdown and a field goal in a 9–3 game to give Vandy its only loss of the season.

Carlisle visited West Point, beating Army 27–6, as Jim Thorpe scored three touchdowns and three extra points, and Alex Arcasa scored two more TDs. Army halfback (and future American president) Dwight D. Eisenhower was injured while tackling Thorpe. Eisenhower, who was described in the press as someone "who hits the line harder than any other man on the Army team" played his last game the following week against Tufts University.

Lehigh won at previously unbeaten (6–0–0) Swarthmore 3–0. Wisconsin beat visiting Arkansas 64–7, Michigan lost at Penn, 27–21, Chicago beat Northwestern 3–0, and Purdue and visiting Illinois played to a 9–9 tie.

Penn State beat Villanova 71–0, Princeton beat NYU 54–0, and Dartmouth beat Amherst 60–0. In Augusta, Georgia, Georgia beat Clemson 27–6 and in Atlanta, Sewanee beat Georgia Tech 7–0. Auburn defeated LSU 7–0 in a game played at Mobile. In a game at Houston, Texas A&M beat Oklahoma 28–6. Texas beat Ole Miss 53–14 in a Wednesday game at Houston.

November 16 Harvard beat Dartmouth at home, 3–0. Yale (7–0–0) traveled to Princeton (7–1–0) and the teams played to a 6–6 tie. In Philadelphia, Carlisle (10–0–1) suffered its first loss, falling to Penn, 34–26. Swarthmore narrowly beat Bucknell, 14–13. Penn State beat Ohio State in Columbus, 37–0. Michigan beat Cornell 20–7 to close its season at 5–2–0 Georgetown beat Virginia 16–13.

Wisconsin won at Minnesota 14–0 and Chicago won at Illinois 10–0. Vanderbilt beat Centre 23–0. Georgia beat Georgia Tech in Atlanta, 20–0 Sewanee and Alabama played to a 6–6 tie in Birmingham. Texas A&M beat Mississippi State 41–7 at Houston, and beat Tulane three days later, 41–0, to extend its record to 7–0–0.

November 23 At the Yale campus in New Haven, Harvard (8–0–0) faced Yale (7–0–1) to wrap up the season. Harvard's 20–0 win left it one of three teams that was unbeaten and untied. Wisconsin closed a perfect season with a 28–10 win at Iowa, to finish 7–0–0. Purdue beat Indiana 34–7 and Chicago won 7–0 over visiting Minnesota. Carlisle won at Springfield College, 30–24. Lehigh won at Lafayette 10–0 Swarthmore closed its season with a 0–0 tie at Dickinson. In Birmingham, Vanderbilt (7–1–0) and Auburn (6–0–0) played to a 7–7 tie. Texas A&M (7–0–0) beat Kansas State 13–10 and Texas defeated Southwestern 28–3.

November 28, Thanksgiving Day, Penn State closed its season with a 38–0 win at Pittsburgh, to finish 8–0–0. Vanderbilt (8–0–1) defeated visiting previously unbeaten Sewanee (5–0–2), winning 16–0. Georgia defeated previously unbeaten Auburn 12–6. Carlisle closed its season with a 32–0 win at Brown. Georgetown beat Virginia Tech 24–3 to close its season at 8–1–0. Texas A&M finished its season in Dallas with a 53–0 win over Baylor, and Texas closed its season with a 48–0 win over visiting Arkansas. Lehigh won at Franklin & Marshall, 29–0.

== Conference standings ==
=== Major conference standings ===
1912 Missouri Valley Conference football standings
	Conf.					Overall
Team	W		L		T	W		L		T
Nebraska +	2	–	0	–	0	8	–	1	–	0
Iowa State +	2	–	0	–	0	6	–	2	–	0
Drake	2	–	2	–	0	5	–	3	–	0
Missouri	2	–	3	–	0	5	–	3	–	0
Kansas	1	–	2	–	0	4	–	4	–	0
Washington University	0	–	2	–	0	4	–	4	–	0
+ – Conference co-champions

1912 Northwest Conference football standings
	Conf.					Overall
Team	W		L		T	W		L		T
Washington $	4	–	0	–	0	6	–	0	–	0
Idaho	2	–	2	–	0	2	–	2	–	0
Whitman	2	–	2	–	0	2	–	2	–	0
Oregon	2	–	3	–	0	3	–	4	–	0
Washington State	2	–	3	–	0	2	–	3	–	0
Oregon Agricultural	1	–	3	–	0	3	–	4	–	0
$ – Conference champion

1912 Rocky Mountain Conference football standings
	Conf.					Overall
Team	W		L		T	W		L		T
Colorado Mines +	5	–	1	–	0	9	–	1	–	0
Utah +	4	–	1	–	0	5	–	1	–	1
Colorado	3	–	2	–	0	6	–	3	–	0
Colorado Agricultural	3	–	2	–	0	3	–	2	–	0
Colorado College	2	–	4	–	0	5	–	4	–	0
Denver	1	–	3	–	0	2	–	6	–	1
Wyoming	0	–	5	–	0	2	–	7	–	0
+ – Conference co-champions

1912 South Atlantic Intercollegiate Athletic Association football standings
	Conf.					Overall
Team	W		L		T	W		L		T
Georgetown $	5	–	0	–	0	8	–	1	–	0
Washington and Lee	3	–	1	–	0	8	–	1	–	0
Virginia	1	–	1	–	0	6	–	3	–	0
VPI	1	–	2	–	0	5	–	4	–	0
Johns Hopkins	0	–	1	–	0	0	–	9	–	0
North Carolina A&M	0	–	2	–	0	4	–	3	–	0
North Carolina	0	–	4	–	0	3	–	4	–	1
$ – Conference champion

1912 Southern Intercollegiate Athletic Association football standings
	Conf.					Overall
Team	W		L		T	W		L		T
Vanderbilt $	3	–	0	–	1	8	–	1	–	1
Texas A&M	2	–	0	–	0	8	–	1	–	0
Kentucky State	1	–	0	–	0	7	–	2	–	0
Auburn	6	–	1	–	1	6	–	1	–	1
Georgia	5	–	1	–	1	6	–	1	–	1
Sewanee	2	–	1	–	2	5	–	1	–	2
Georgia Tech	5	–	3	–	0	5	–	3	–	1
Alabama	3	–	3	–	1	5	–	3	–	1
Tulane	3	–	3	–	0	5	–	3	–	0
Mississippi A&M	3	–	3	–	0	4	–	3	–	0
Clemson	3	–	3	–	0	4	–	4	–	0
Ole Miss	2	–	2	–	0	5	–	3	–	0
Mercer	2	–	3	–	1	5	–	3	–	1
LSU	2	–	3	–	0	4	–	3	–	0
Mississippi College	1	–	4	–	0	3	–	4	–	0
Tennessee	1	–	4	–	0	4	–	4	–	0
Florida	0	–	2	–	1	5	–	2	–	1
Central University	0	–	2	–	0	4	–	5	–	0
The Citadel	0	–	3	–	0	2	–	4	–	0
Howard (AL)	0	–	4	–	0	1	–	7	–	0
$ – Conference champion

1912 Texas Intercollegiate Athletic Association football standings
	Conf.					Overall
Team	W		L		T	W		L		T
Texas A&M $	4	–	0	–	0	8	–	1	–	0
Texas	4	–	0	–	0	7	–	1	–	0
TCU	7	–	1	–	0	8	–	1	–	0
Southwestern (TX)	3	–	2	–	0	3	–	3	–	0
Daniel Baker	3	–	2	–	2	3	–	2	–	2
Austin	3	–	3	–	0	4	–	3	–	0
Baylor	2	–	5	–	0	3	–	5	–	0
Polytechnic (TX)	1	–	5	–	1	1	–	5	–	1
Trinity (TX)	0	–	7	–	0	0	–	7	–	0
$ – Conference champion

1912 Western Conference football standings
	Conf.					Overall
Team	W		L		T	W		L		T
Wisconsin $	5	–	0	–	0	7	–	0	–	0
Chicago	6	–	1	–	0	6	–	1	–	0
Purdue	2	–	2	–	1	4	–	2	–	1
Minnesota	2	–	2	–	0	4	–	3	–	0
Northwestern	2	–	3	–	0	2	–	3	–	1
Illinois	1	–	3	–	1	3	–	3	–	1
Iowa	1	–	3	–	0	4	–	3	–	0
Indiana	0	–	5	–	0	2	–	5	–	0
$ – Conference champion

=== Independents ===
1912 Eastern college football independents records
	Conf.			Overall
Team	W	L	T	W		L		T
Harvard		–		9	–	0	–	0
Penn State		–		8	–	0	–	0
Carlisle		–		12	–	1	–	1
Princeton		–		7	–	1	–	1
Swarthmore		–		7	–	1	–	1
Yale		–		7	–	1	–	1
Lehigh		–		9	–	2	–	0
Dartmouth		–		7	–	2	–	0
Wesleyan		–		7	–	2	–	0
Colgate		–		5	–	2	–	0
Washington & Jefferson		–		8	–	3	–	1
Rhode Island State		–		6	–	3	–	0
Bucknell		–		6	–	3	–	1
Temple		–		3	–	2	–	0
Penn		–		7	–	4	–	0
Army		–		5	–	3	–	0
Brown		–		6	–	4	–	0
Franklin & Marshall		–		6	–	4	–	0
Holy Cross		–		4	–	3	–	1
Rutgers		–		5	–	4	–	0
Tufts		–		5	–	4	–	0
Fordham		–		4	–	4	–	0
Villanova		–		3	–	3	–	0
Lafayette		–		4	–	5	–	1
Syracuse		–		4	–	5	–	0
Carnegie Tech		–		3	–	4	–	1
New Hampshire		–		3	–	4	–	1
Vermont		–		3	–	5	–	0
Pittsburgh		–		3	–	6	–	0
Boston College		–		2	–	4	–	1
Cornell		–		3	–	7	–	0
NYU		–		2	–	6	–	0

1912 Midwestern college football independents records
	Conf.			Overall
Team	W	L	T	W		L		T
Notre Dame		–		7	–	0	–	0
Lincoln (MO)		–		1	–	0	–	0
Lake Forest		–		5	–	0	–	1
Michigan Agricultural		–		7	–	1	–	0
North Dakota Agricultural		–		5	–	1	–	0
South Dakota		–		5	–	1	–	0
Mount Union		–		9	–	2	–	0
Saint Louis		–		7	–	1	–	2
Michigan		–		5	–	2	–	0
Wabash		–		5	–	2	–	0
Buchtel		–		5	–	2	–	1
Detroit		–		5	–	2	–	1
Iowa State Teachers		–		5	–	2	–	1
St. Mary's (OH)		–		4	–	2	–	0
Michigan State Normal		–		4	–	2	–	1
Butler		–		5	–	3	–	0
Doane		–		5	–	3	–	0
Haskell		–		7	–	4	–	0
Central Michigan		–		2	–	1	–	2
Western State Normal		–		3	–	2	–	0
St. Viator		–		4	–	4	–	0
Fairmount		–		4	–	5	–	0
Marquette		–		3	–	4	–	0
Northern Illinois State		–		3	–	5	–	0
Baldwin–Wallace		–		0	–	1	–	0
Heidelberg		–		0	–	6	–	0

1912 Southern college football independents records
	Conf.			Overall
Team	W	L	T	W		L		T
Middle Tennessee State Normal		–		1	–	0	–	0
Texas		–		7	–	1	–	0
VMI		–		7	–	1	–	0
Maryland		–		6	–	1	–	1
Oklahoma A&M		–		5	–	2	–	0
Stetson		–		5	–	2	–	0
Livingstone		–		3	–	1	–	1
Louisville		–		3	–	1	–	0
Morris Harvey		–		3	–	1	–	0
Mississippi Normal		–		2	–	1	–	0
South Carolina		–		5	–	2	–	1
Navy		–		6	–	3	–	0
Spring Hill		–		4	–	2	–	0
Oklahoma		–		5	–	4	–	0
Rice		–		3	–	2	–	0
Chattanooga		–		4	–	4	–	0
Sam Houston Normal		–		2	–	2	–	0
Southwest Texas State		–		3	–	3	–	2
Davidson		–		3	–	4	–	0
Marshall		–		3	–	4	–	0
Southwestern Louisiana Industrial		–		3	–	4	–	0
Tennessee Docs		–		3	–	4	–	0
Arkansas		–		4	–	6	–	0
Baylor		–		3	–	5	–	0
Catholic University		–		3	–	5	–	0
Louisiana Industrial		–		1	–	2	–	1
West Tennessee State Normal		–		1	–	2	–	1
Wake Forest		–		2	–	6	–	0
Kendall		–		1	–	4	–	0
Delaware		–		1	–	6	–	1
Birmingham		–		1	–	6	–	0
Biddle		–		0	–	1	–	0

1912 Western college football independents records
	Conf.			Overall
Team	W	L	T	W		L		T
New Mexico A&M		–		5	–	1	–	0
Utah Agricultural		–		4	–	2	–	1
Arizona		–		2	–	1	–	0
Montana		–		4	–	3	–	0
Cheney Normal		–		0	–	1	–	0
Montana Agricultural		–		0	–	2	–	0
New Mexico		–		0	–	4	–	0

=== Minor conferences ===
Conference	Champion(s)	Record
Central Intercollegiate Athletics Association	Howard	3–0
Kansas Collegiate Athletic Conference	Kansas State Agricultural	5–0
Louisiana Intercollegiate Athletic Association	Unknown	—
Michigan Intercollegiate Athletic Association	Alma	3–0
Ohio Athletic Conference	Ohio State	5–0

=== Minor conference standings ===
1912 Colored Intercollegiate Athletic Association football standings
	Conf.					Overall
Team	W		L		T	W		L		T
Howard $	3	–	0	–	0	5	–	0	–	0
Hampton	3	–	1	–	0	4	–	1	–	0
Virginia Union	0	–	1	–	0	2	–	1	–	0
Lincoln (PA)	0	–	2	–	0	0	–	2	–	0
Shaw	0	–	2	–	0	0	–	2	–	0
$ – Conference champion

1912 Eastern Virginia Intercollegiate Athletic Association football standings
	Conf.					Overall
Team	W		L		T	W		L		T
Randolph–Macon $	3	–	0	–	0	5	–	2	–	0
Hampden–Sydney	2	–	1	–	0	2	–	6	–	0
Richmond	1	–	2	–	0	1	–	7	–	0
William & Mary	0	–	3	–	0	0	–	7	–	0
$ – Conference champion

1912 Illinois Intercollegiate Athletic Conference football standings
	Conf.					Overall
Team	W		L		T	W		L		T
Carthage	2	–	1	–	0	5	–	2	–	0
Southern Illinois			–			3	–	4	–	0

1912 Ohio Athletic Conference football standings
	Conf.					Overall
Team	W		L		T	W		L		T
Ohio State $	5	–	0	–	0	6	–	3	–	0
Oberlin	5	–	1	–	0	7	–	1	–	0
Western Reserve	4	–	1	–	0	5	–	4	–	0
Denison	4	–	1	–	1	6	–	1	–	1
Miami (OH)	1	–	1	–	2	3	–	3	–	2
Case	3	–	3	–	0	4	–	5	–	0
Wittenberg	2	–	3	–	1	6	–	3	–	1
Kenyon	2	–	3	–	1	4	–	3	–	1
Ohio Wesleyan	2	–	5	–	0	3	–	6	–	0
Wooster	1	–	4	–	1	1	–	4	–	1
Cincinnati	0	–	3	–	1	3	–	4	–	1
Ohio	0	–	4	–	1	1	–	7	–	1
$ – Conference champion

1912 Western Pennsylvania and West Virginia Intercollegiate Athletic Association standings
	Conf.					Overall
Team	W		L		T	W		L		T
Grove City $	3	–	0	–	1	6	–	2	–	1
West Virginia	3	–	0	–	0	6	–	3	–	0
Geneva	1	–	2	–	0	3	–	4	–	0
Westminster (PA)	1	–	3	–	0	3	–	6	–	0
Allegheny	1	–	3	–	0	1	–	5	–	1
Carnegie Tech	0	–	1	–	1	3	–	4	–	1
$ – Conference champion

== Awards and honors ==
=== All-Americans ===
The consensus All-America team included:

Position	Name	Height	Weight (lbs.)	Class	Hometown	Team
QB	George Crowther			Sr.	Fitchburg, Massachusetts	Brown
HB	Charles Brickley	5'10"	181	So.	Everett, Massachusetts	Harvard
HB	Jim Thorpe	6'1"	190	Sr.	Shawnee, Oklahoma	Carlisle
FB	Leroy Mercer	5'11"	175	Sr.	Kennett Square, Pennsylvania	Penn
E	Doug Bomeisler	5'11"	190	Sr.	Brooklyn, New York	Yale
T	Wesley Englehorn			Sr.	Spokane, Washington	Dartmouth
G	Stan Pennock	5'8"	193	So.	Syracuse, New York	Harvard
C	Hank Ketcham	6'0"	175	Jr.	Englewood, New Jersey	Yale
G	John Logan			Sr.	Brooklyn, New York	Princeton
T	Bob Butler	5'10"	200	Jr.	Glen Ridge, New Jersey	Wisconsin
E	Sam Felton			Sr.		Harvard

== Statistical leaders ==
- Team scoring most points: Carlisle, 454
- Team scoring most points by margin: Vanderbilt, 391 to 19
- Player scoring most points: Jim Thorpe, Carlisle, 224
- Player scoring most touchdowns: Jim Thorpe, 29
- Total offense leader: Jim Thorpe, 1972
- Rushing yards leader: Jim Thorpe, 1869+
- Rushing avg. leader: Jim Thorpe, 9.8
