= 1912 Texas Longhorns football team =

American college football season

1912 Texas Longhorns football
- Conference: Texas Intercollegiate Athletic Association
- Record: 7–1 (4-0 TIAA)
- Head coach: Dave Allerdice (2nd season)
- Captain: Frost Woodhull
- Home stadium: Clark Field

1912 Texas Intercollegiate Athletic Association football standings
	Conf.					Overall
Team	W		L		T	W		L		T
Texas A&M $	4	–	0	–	0	8	–	1	–	0
Texas	4	–	0	–	0	7	–	1	–	0
TCU	7	–	1	–	0	8	–	1	–	0
Southwestern (TX)	3	–	2	–	0	3	–	3	–	0
Daniel Baker	3	–	2	–	2	3	–	2	–	2
Austin	3	–	3	–	0	4	–	3	–	0
Baylor	2	–	5	–	0	3	–	5	–	0
Polytechnic (TX)	1	–	5	–	1	1	–	5	–	1
Trinity (TX)	0	–	7	–	0	0	–	7	–	0
$ – Conference champion

The 1912 Texas Longhorns football team was an American football team that represented the University of Texas (now known as the University of Texas at Austin) as a member of the Texas Intercollegiate Athletic Association during the 1912 college football season. In their second year under head coach Dave Allerdice, the Longhorns compiled an overall record of 7–1 and a conference record of 4-0.

== Schedule ==
Date	Opponent	Site	Result	Attendance	Source
October 5	TCU	Clark Field; Austin, TX (rivalry)	W 30–10	2,500	
October 12	Austin	Clark Field; Austin, TX	W 3–0		
October 19	vs. Oklahoma	Gaston Field; Dallas, TX (rivalry)	L 6–21		
October 26	Haskell	Clark Field; Austin, TX	W 14–7		
November 4	at Baylor	Carroll Field; Waco, TX (rivalry)	W 19–7	2,000	
November 13	vs. Ole Miss	West End Park; Houston, TX	W 53–14		
November 22	Southwestern (TX)	Clark Field; Austin, TX	W 28–3	1,500	
November 28	Arkansas	Clark Field; Austin, TX (rivalry)	W 48–0		
