= Biddle football, 1910–1919 =

American college football seasons

The Biddle football team represented Biddle University (now known as Johnson C. Smith University) in American football. The team was founded in 1892.

== 1910–1911 ==
Biddle did not compete in collegiate football in any of the seasons from 1893 to 1911.

== 1912 ==
1912 Biddle football
- Conference: Independent
- Record: 0–1
- Head coach: Unknown

The 1912 Biddle football team represented Biddle University in the 1912 college football season as an independent. In their first season since 1892, Biddle played one game, losing 2–13 against Livingstone College.

=== Schedule ===
Date	Time	Opponent	Site	Result	Source
November 28	11:00 a.m.	Livingstone	Wearn Athletic Park Field; Charlotte, NC	L 2–13	

== 1913 ==
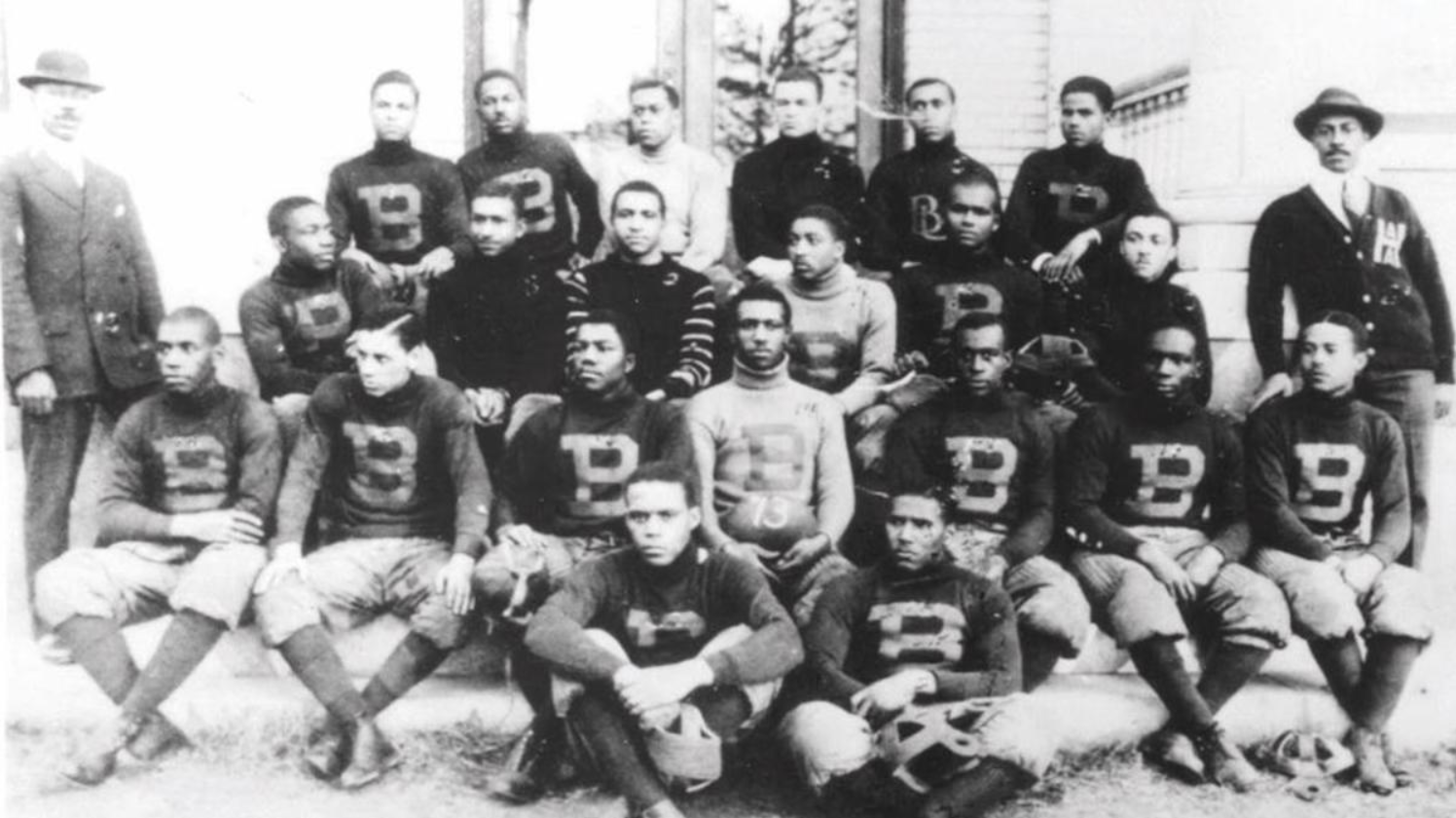
1913 Biddle football team

== 1914 ==
1914 Biddle football
- Conference: Independent
- Record: 0–1
- Head coach: Unknown

The 1914 Biddle football team represented Biddle University in the 1914 college football season as an independent. Biddle played one game, losing against rival Livingstone.

=== Schedule ===
Date	Opponent	Site	Result	Source
November 20	Livingstone	Charlotte, NC	L 6–13	

== 1915 ==
1915 Biddle football
- Conference: Independent
- Record: 0–1
- Head coach: Unknown

The 1915 Biddle football team represented Biddle University in the 1915 college football season as an independent. Biddle played one game, losing against rival Livingstone in an annual Thanksgiving game.

=== Schedule ===
Date	Opponent	Site	Result	Source
November 8	Howard	Biddle Field; Charlotte, NC	Canceled	
November 12	at Benedict	Columbia, SC	Unknown	
November 25	at Livingstone	Salisbury, NC	L 0–6	

== 1918–1919 ==
Biddle did not play college football from 1918 to 1919.
