= Stetson Hatters football, 1910–1919 =

American college football season

1910–1919 Stetson Hatters football
- Conference: Independent
- Head coach: Litchfield Colton (1910–1911); John H. Manning (1912); Albert Jordan (1913) C. H. Campbell (1914) Bill Hollander (1916) Horace Allen (1919)
- Home stadium: Stetson Athletic Field

The Stetson Hatters football program, 1910–1919 represented John B. Stetson University—now known as Stetson University—during the 1910s in college football as an independent. The team did not play in 1915 or from 1917 to 1918. The team was led by six different head coaches; Litchfield Colton who held the position from 1904 to 1911, John H. Manning in 1912, Albert Jordan in 1913, C. H. Campbell in 1914, Bill Hollander in 1916, and Horace Allen who held the position from 1919 to 1923. During the 1910s, the Hatters compiled a 20–14 record, finished undefeated twice, and recorded four winning seasons in seven years of competition. Highlights of the decade include:

- The 1910 Stetson Hatters football team compiled an undefeated 3–0 record.
- The 1912 Stetson Hatters football team compiled a then-record of five wins in a season after finishing with a 5–2 record.
- The 1913 Stetson Hatters football team compiled an undefeated 3–0 record.

The team played its home games at Stetson Athletic Field in DeLand, Florida.

== Decade overview ==
Year	Head coach	Overall record	Points scored	Points allowed	Delta
1910	Litchfield Colton	3–0	50	0	+49
1911	Litchfield Colton	1–3	15	50	-35
1912	John H. Manning	5–2	236	45	+191
1913	Albert Jordan	3–0	51	14	+15
1914	C. H. Campbell	1–4	6	87	-79
1916	Bill Hollander	3–1	92	19	+78
1919	Horace Allen	4–4	105	121	-16
Total		20–14	555	336	+219

== 1910 ==
1910 Stetson Hatters football
- Conference: Independent
- Record: 3–0
- Head coach: Litchfield Colton (7th season)

The 1910 Stetson Hatters football team represented John B. Stetson University—now known as Stetson University—as an independent during the 1910 college football season. In their seventh year under head coach Litchfield Colton, the Hatters compiled a perfect 3–0 record and outscored opponents by a total of 49 to 0.

=== Schedule ===
Date	Opponent	Site	Result	Source
October 29	at Orlando High School	Orlando, FL	W 5–0	
November 12	Columbia (FL)	DeLand, FL	W 10–0	
November 26	All-Jacksonville	DeLand, FL	W 34–0	

== 1911 ==
1911 Stetson Hatters football
- Conference: Independent
- Record: 1–3
- Head coach: Litchfield Colton (8th season)
- Captain: Wiffard

The 1911 Stetson Hatters football team represented John B. Stetson University—now known as Stetson University—as an independent during the 1911 college football season. In their eighth year under head coach Litchfield Colton, the Hatters compiled a 1–3 record and were outscored by opponents by a total of 50 to 15.

=== Schedule ===
Date	Time	Opponent	Site	Result	Attendance	Source
October 14	3:00 p.m.	Summerlin Institute	DeLand, FL	W 10–0		
November 11		Florida	DeLand, FL	L 0–27	1,500	
		Orlando		L 5–6		
November 23		at Summerlin Institute	Bartow, FL	L 0–17		

== 1912 ==
1912 Stetson Hatters football
- Conference: Independent
- Record: 5–2
- Head coach: John H. Manning (1st season)

The 1912 Stetson Hatters football team represented John B. Stetson University—now known as Stetson University—as an independent during the 1912 college football season. In their first year under head coach John H. Manning, the Hatters compiled a 5–2 record and outscored opponents by a total of 236 to 45.

=== Schedule ===
Date	Opponent	Site	Result	Source
October 18	Southern College	DeLand, FL	W 71–0	
October 26	vs. Mercer	Waycross, GA	L 5–6	
November 2	College of Charleston	DeLand, FL	W 87–0	
November 9	Riverside Military Academy	DeLand, FL	W 26–3	
November 15	at Florida	University Field; Gainseville, FL	L 7–23	
November 21	Davidson	DeLand, FL	W 21–6	
	Georgia Military		W 19–7	

== 1913 ==
1913 Stetson Hatters football
- Conference: Independent
- Record: 3–0
- Head coach: Albert Jordan (1st season)

The 1913 Stetson Hatters football team represented John B. Stetson University—now known as Stetson University—as an independent during the 1913 college football season. In their first year under head coach Albert Jordan, the Hatters compiled a perfect 3–0 record and outscored opponents by a total of 51 to 14.

=== Schedule ===
Date	Opponent	Site	Result	Source
October 20	Maryville (TN)	Stetson Athletic Field; DeLand, FL	W 13–2	
November 7	vs. Mercer	Jacksonville, FL	W 13–6	
November 27	vs. Bingham Military School	Jacksonville, FL	W 25–6	

== 1914 ==
1914 Stetson Hatters football
- Conference: Independent
- Record: 1–4
- Head coach: C. H. Campbell (1st season)
- Captain: Winfred Liddell

The 1914 Stetson Hatters football team represented John B. Stetson University—now known as Stetson University—as an independent during the 1914 college football season. In their first year under head coach C. H. Campbell, the Hatters compiled a 1–4 record and were outscored by opponents by a total of 87 to 6.

=== Schedule ===
Date	Time	Opponent	Site	Result	Attendance	Source
October 19		King (TN)	DeLand, FL	L 0–7		
October 24	3:00 p.m.	Southern College	DeLand, FL	L 0–12		
November 6		vs. Gordon Institute	Jacksonville, FL	W 7–0		
November 12		vs. Mercer	Jacksonville, FL	L 0–45		
November 26	3:00 p.m.	vs. Southern College	Plant Field; Tampa, FL	L 0–21	~800	

== 1916 ==
1916 Stetson Hatters football
- Conference: Independent
- Record: 3–1
- Head coach: Bill Hollander (1st season)
- Captain: Smith

The 1916 Stetson Hatters football team represented John B. Stetson University—now known as Stetson University—as an independent during the 1916 college football season. In their first year under head coach Bill Hollander, the Hatters compiled a 3–1 record and outscored opponents by a total of 92 to 19.

=== Schedule ===
Date	Opponent	Site	Result	Source
October 27	Rollins	DeLand, FL	W 34–0	
November 18	at Rollins	Morse Athletic Field; Winter Park, FL	W 43–0	
November 30	vs. Southern College	Plant Field; Tampa, FL	W 8–6	
December 9	Southern College	DeLand, FL	L 7–13	

== 1919 ==
1919 Stetson Hatters football
- Conference: Independent
- Record: 4–4
- Head coach: Horace Allen (1st season)

The 1919 Stetson Hatters football team represented John B. Stetson University—now known as Stetson University—as an independent during the 1919 college football season. In their first year under head coach Horace Allen, the Hatters compiled a 4–4 record and were outscored by opponents by a total of 121 to 105.

=== Schedule ===
Date	Time	Opponent	Site	Result	Attendance	Source
		Florida Military Academy		W 31–0		
		Rollins		W 12–0		
		Carlstrom Field		W 18–6		
November 8	3:00 p.m.	vs. Southern College	Plant Field; Tampa, FL	L 0–19		
		Rollins		W 32–0		
November 15		at Florida	Fleming Field; Gainesville, FL	L 0–64	600+	
November 27		Southern College		L 12–25		
January 1, 1920		at Cuban Athletic Club	Havana, Cuba	L 0–7		
All times are in Eastern time
