= 1912 Louisville Cardinals football team =

American college football season

1912 Louisville Cardinals football

KIAA champion
- Conference: Kentucky Intercollegiate Athletic Association
- Record: 3–1 (2–0 KIAA)
- Head coach: Lester Larson (1st season)
- Home stadium: High School Park

The 1912 Louisville Cardinals football team, commonly known in 1912 as the "Red and Black", was an American football team that represented the University of Louisville in the Kentucky Intercollegiate Athletic Association (KIAA) during the 1912 college football season. In the school's first season of intercollegiate football, the Cardinals were led by head coach Lester Larson and compiled a 5–1 record. The team played its home games at High School Park in Louisville, Kentucky.

== Schedule ==
Date	Time	Opponent	Site	Result	Source
October 11		at Transylvania	Thomas Field; Lexington, KY	W 32–0	
October 17		Central University	High School Park; Louisville, KY	W 23–6	
October 26		at Kentucky*	Stoll Field; Lexington, KY (rivalry)	L 0–41	
November 15	3:00 p.m.	Hanover*	High School Park; Louisville, KY	W 73–0	
*Non-conference game
