= Honored Arizona Wildcats men's basketball players =

The Arizona Wildcats men's basketball team was founded in 1904 to represent the University of Arizona in intercollegiate competition and has participated in the sport all but one season since its inception. Over the course of the team's history, the Wildcats' performance has ranged from losing records to resulting in a national championship.

During periods of both ascendancy and mediocrity, individual Arizona players of exceptional ability have received various accolades. In total, Wildcats have been named to an All-America team 35 times, and All-Pac-12 Conference/Big 12 Conference team 114 times. Of the All-America selections, thirty-seven players received first-team honors a total of fifty-eight times. Sixteen players were named consensus first-team All-Americans a total of twenty-five times.

Wildcats have won several nationally recognized individual awards, including the Bob Cousy Award, the Senior CLASS Award, Academic All-America of the Year, and several of the National Player of the Year awards. The College Basketball Hall of Fame has inducted one former Arizona player, and the Naismith Memorial Basketball Hall of Fame has enshrined three. Former Wildcats head coach have also been inducted into the College Basketball Hall of Fame.

== All-Americans ==
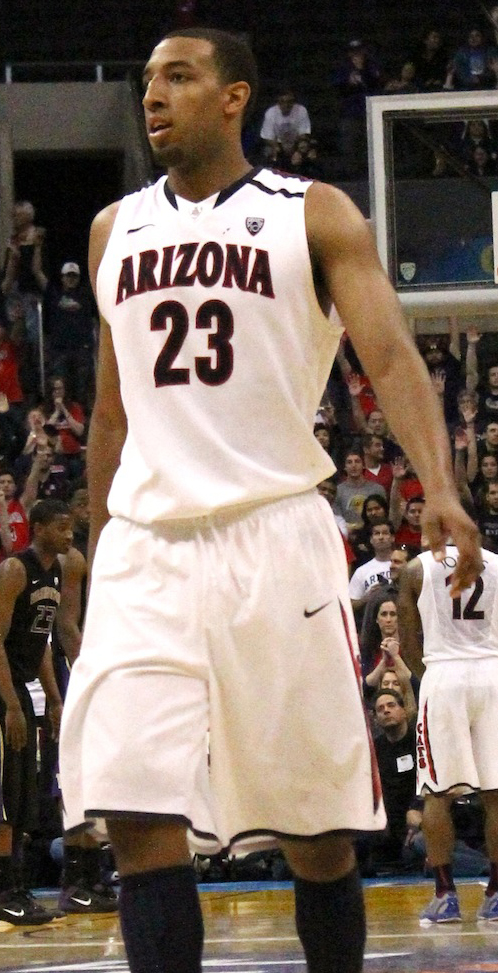
Derrick Williams

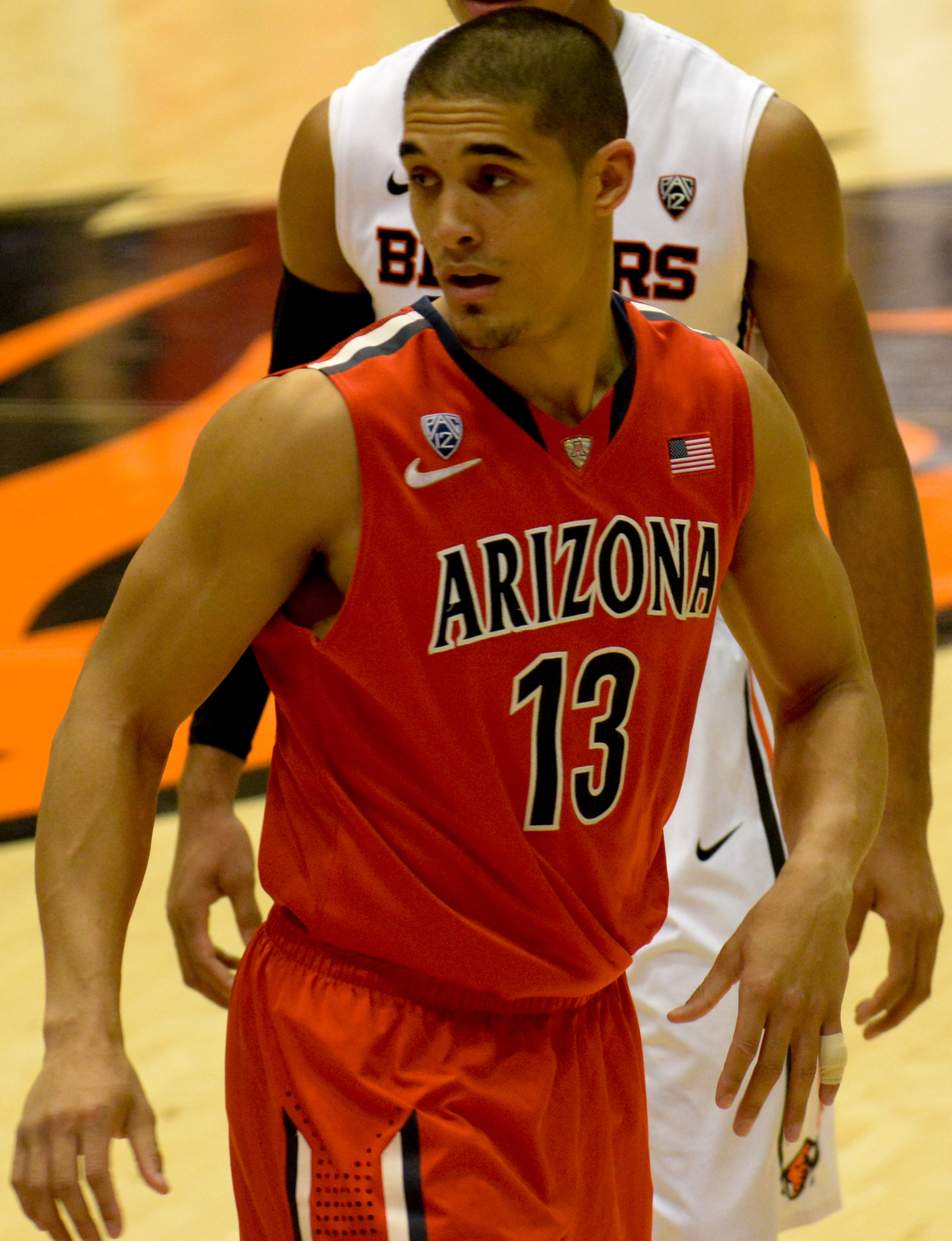
Nick Johnson

Each year, numerous publications and organizations release lists of All-America teams, hypothetical rosters of players considered the best in the nation at their respective positions. Some selecting organizations choose more than one roster of All-Americans, in which case they use the terms "first team", "second team", and "third team" as appropriate. Some selectors also award honorable mentions to outstanding players who did not make any of their teams. The National Collegiate Athletic Association (NCAA), a college sports governing body, uses officially recognized All-America selectors to determine the "consensus" selections. To earn "consensus" status, a player must win honors based on a point system computed from the four different all-America teams. The point system consists of three points for first team, two points for second team and one point for third team. No honorable mention or fourth team or lower are used in the computation. The top five totals plus ties are first team and the next five plus ties are second team. Over time, the sources used to determine the consensus selections have changed, and since 1997, the NCAA has used these selectors to determine consensus All-Americans: Associated Press (AP), the United States Basketball Writers Association (USBWA), the Sporting News (TSN), and the National Association of Basketball Coaches (NABC).

The following is a list of Arizona Wildcats men's basketball players that were named first, second or third team All-Americans:

Consensus All-Americans

- 1951 – Roger Johnson
- 1976 – Bob Elliott
- 1977 – Bob Elliott (2)
- 1988 – Sean Elliott (Consensus)
- 1988 – Steve Kerr
- 1989 – Sean Elliott (2, Consensus)
- 1992 – Sean Rooks
- 1993 – Chris Mills
- 1994 – Khalid Reeves (Consensus)
- 1995 – Damon Stoudamire (Consensus)
- 1997 – Michael Dickerson
- 1998 – Mike Bibby (Consensus)
- 1998 – Michael Dickerson (2)
- 1998 – Miles Simon (Consensus)
- 1999 – Jason Terry (Consensus)
- 2000 – Loren Woods
- 2000 – Michael Wright
- 2001 – Loren Woods (2)
- 2001 – Michael Wright (2)
- 2002 – Jason Gardner
- 2002 – Luke Walton
- 2003 – Jason Gardner (Consensus)
- 2003 – Andre Iguodala
- 2005 – Salim Stoudamire (Consensus)
- 2009 – Jordan Hill
- 2011 – Derrick Williams (Consensus)
- 2014 – Nick Johnson (Consensus)
- 2014 – Aaron Gordon
- 2015 – Stanley Johnson (3rd-Team, NABC)
- 2017 – Lauri Markkanen (3rd-Team, AP, USA Today, Sporting News, NBC Sports)
- 2018 – Deandre Ayton (Consensus)
- 2022 – Bennedict Mathurin (Consensus 2nd-Team)
- 2023 – Ąžuolas Tubelis (Consensus 2nd-Team)
- 2024 – Caleb Love (USBWA & NABC 2nd team, AP & SN 3rd Team)
- 2026 – Jaden Bradley (NABC, SN, USBWA 3rd Team)

Source: Arizona 2026–27 Media Guide

Fourteen Arizona players have received AP All-America honorable mention:

- 1991 – Chris Mills (AP Honorable Mention)
- 1991 – Brian Williams (AP Honorable Mention)
- 1992 – Chris Mills (2) (AP Honorable Mention)
- 1992 – Sean Rooks (AP Honorable Mention)
- 1994 – Damon Stoudamire (AP Honorable Mention, Basketball Weekly, USBWA)
- 1997 – Michael Dickerson (AP Honorable Mention)
- 2000 – Loren Woods (AP Honorable Mention)
- 2000 – Michael Wright (AP Honorable Mention)
- 2001 – Jason Gardner (AP Honorable Mention)
- 2001 – Loren Woods (2) (AP Honorable Mention)
- 2003 – Luke Walton (AP Honorable Mention)
- 2004 – Andre Iguodala (AP Honorable Mention)
- 2009 – Chase Budinger (AP Honorable Mention)
- 2018 – Allonzo Trier (AP Honorable Mention)

=== All-Pac-12/Big 12 Conference ===
The following is a list of Arizona Wildcats men's basketball players that were named first, second or third team All-Pac-12/Big 12:

First team All-Pac-12/Big 12

- 1979 – Larry Demic
- 1980 – Joe Dehls (2)
- 1981 – Ron Davis
- 1984 – Pete Williams
- 1985 – Pete Williams (2)
- 1985 – Eddie Smith
- 1986 – Steve Kerr
- 1987 – Sean Elliott
- 1988 – Sean Elliott (2)‡
- 1988 – Steve Kerr (2)
- 1988 – Anthony Cook
- 1989 – Sean Elliott (3)‡
- 1989 – Anthony Cook (2)
- 1990 – Jud Buechler
- 1991 – Brian Williams
- 1992 – Chris Mills
- 1992 – Sean Rooks
- 1993 – Damon Stoudamire
- 1993 – Chris Mills (2)‡
- 1994 – Khalid Reeves
- 1994 – Damon Stoudamire (2)
- 1995 – Ray Owes
- 1995 – Damon Stoudamire (3)‡
- 1996 – Ben Davis
- 1996 – Reggie Geary
- 1997 – Michael Dickerson
- 1998 – Mike Bibby‡
- 1998 – Michael Dickerson (2)
- 1998 – Miles Simon
- 1999 – A.J. Bramlett
- 1999 – Jason Terry‡
- 2000 – Jason Gardner
- 2000 – Michael Wright
- 2000 – Loren Woods
- 2001 – Gilbert Arenas
- 2001 – Michael Wright (2)
- 2002 – Jason Gardner (2)
- 2002 – Luke Walton
- 2003 – Jason Gardner (3)
- 2003 – Luke Walton (2)
- 2004 – Channing Frye
- 2004 – Andre Iguodala
- 2005 – Channing Frye (2)
- 2005 – Salim Stoudamire
- 2006 – Hassan Adams
- 2007 – Marcus Williams
- 2009 – Jordan Hill
- 2010 – Derrick Williams
- 2011 – Derrick Williams (2)‡
- 2012 – Kyle Fogg
- 2012 – Solomon Hill
- 2013 – Solomon Hill (2)
- 2014 – Aaron Gordon
- 2014 – Nick Johnson‡
- 2015 – Rondae Hollis-Jefferson
- 2015 – Stanley Johnson
- 2015 – T. J. McConnell
- 2016 – Ryan Anderson
- 2017 – Lauri Markkanen
- 2018 – Deandre Ayton‡
- 2018 – Allonzo Trier
- 2020 – Zeke Nnaji
- 2020 - Josh Green
- 2021 – James Akinjo
- 2022 - Christian Koloko
- 2022 - Bennedict Mathurin‡
- 2022 - Ąžuolas Tubelis
- 2023 - Oumar Ballo
- 2023 - Ąžuolas Tubelis (2)
- 2024 - Oumar Ballo (2)
- 2024 - Caleb Love
- 2025 - Caleb Love (2)
- 2026 - Jaden Bradley
- 2026 - Brayden Burries
- 2026 - Motiejus Krivas

Second team All-Pac-12/Big 12

- 1979 – Joe Dehls
- 2008 – Jerryd Bayless
- 2009 – Nic Wise
- 2014 – T. J. McConnell
- 2016 – Kaleb Tarczewski
- 2016 – Gabe York
- 2017 – Allonzo Trier
- 2017 – Kadeem Allen
- 2018 – Dušan Ristić
- 2020 – Nico Mannion
- 2024 – Pelle Larsson

Third team All-Pac-12

- 2008 – Chase Budinger
- 2026 – Koa Peat

Note

- ‡ indicates player was Pac-12 Player of the Year.

Pac-12/Big 12 All Freshman Team

- 1984 – Michael Tait
- 1986 – Sean Elliott ‡
- 1989 – Sean Rooks
- 1989 – Matt Othick
- 1990 – Ed Stokes
- 1991 – Khalid Reeves
- 1992 – Damon Stoudamire
- 1997 – Mike Bibby ‡
- 1999 – Richard Jefferson
- 1999 – Michael Wright ‡
- 2000 – Gilbert Arenas
- 2000 – Jason Gardner
- 2002 – Channing Frye
- 2002 – Salim Stoudamire ‡
- 2003 – Hassan Adams
- 2003 – Andre Iguodala
- 2004 – Mustafa Shakur
- 2006 – Marcus Williams
- 2007 – Chase Budinger ‡
- 2008 – Jerryd Bayless
- 2010 – Derrick Williams ‡
- 2012 – Nick Johnson
- 2014 – Aaron Gordon‡
- 2014 – Rondae Hollis-Jefferson
- 2015 – Stanley Johnson‡
- 2016 – Allonzo Trier
- 2017 – Lauri Markkanen
- 2017 – Rawle Alkins
- 2018 – Deandre Ayton‡
- 2020 – Zeke Nnaji‡
- 2020 – Nico Mannion
- 2021 – Bennedict Mathurin
- 2021 – Ąžuolas Tubelis
- 2026 - Brayden Burries
- 2026 – Koa Peat

Note

- ‡ indicates player was Pac-12/Big 12 Freshman of the Year.

Pac-12/Big 12 All Newcomer

- 1995 – Ben Davis Jr.
- 1997 – Bennett Davison Jr.
- 2000 – Loren Woods ‡

Note

- ‡ indicates player was Pac-12/Big 12 Newcomer of the Year

Pac-12/Big 12 All-Defensive Team

- 2009 – Jordan Hill
- 2012 – Kyle Fogg
- 2014 – Nick Johnson
- 2014 – T. J. McConnell
- 2015 – Rondae Hollis-Jefferson
- 2015 – T. J. McConnell
- 2016 – Kaleb Tarczewski
- 2017 – Kadeem Allen
- 2018 – Deandre Ayton
- 2022 - Christian Koloko‡
- 2022 - Dalen Terry
- 2026 - Jaden Bradley
- 2026 - Motiejus Krivas

Pac-12/Big 12 All-Academic Team

- 1986 – Steve Kerr
- 1988 – Steve Kerr (2)
- 1989 – Matt Muehlebach
- 1990 – Matt Muehlebach (2)
- 1991 – Matt Muehlebach (3)
- 1994 – Kevin Flanagan
- 2001 – Eugene Edgerson
- 2004 – Jason Ranne‡
- 2004 – Andre Iguodala^
- 2004 – Brett Brielmaier‡
- 2019 – Chase Jeter‡
- 2020 – Stone Gettings‡
- 2022 – Jordan Mains
- 2024 – Pelle Larsson

All-Pac 12/Big 12 Tournament Team

- 1988 – Sean Rooks
- 1988 – Steve Kerr
- 1988 – Anthony Cook
- 1989 – Sean Rooks (2)
- 1989 – Jud Buechler
- 1989 – Anthony Cook
- 1990 – Jud Buechler (2)
- 1990 – Matt Muehlebach
- 2002 – Luke Walton
- 2004 – Hassan Adams
- 2005 – Salim Stoudamire
- 2005 – Channing Frye
- 2011 – Derrick Williams
- 2012 – Kyle Fogg
- 2012 – Solomon Hill
- 2012 – Jesse Perry
- 2014 – Aaron Gordon
- 2014 – Nick Johnson
- 2015 – Brandon Ashley
- 2015 – Rondae Hollis-Jefferson
- 2015 – Stanley Johnson
- 2015 – T. J. McConnell
- 2017 – Allonzo Trier
- 2017 – Lauri Markkanen
- 2018 – Deandre Ayton
- 2018 – Dusan Ristic
- 2022 – Bennedict Mathurin
- 2022 – Christian Koloko
- 2023 – Ąžuolas Tubelis
- 2023 – Oumar Ballo
- 2024 – Oumar Ballo
- 2025 – Caleb Love
- 2026 – Jaden Bradley
- 2026 – Brayden Burries

Note

- ‡ indicates player was Pac-12/Big 12 Defensive Player of the Year

Source: Arizona 2025–26 Media Guide

== Award recipients ==
=== Players ===
John R. Wooden Award

- 1989 – Sean Elliott

National player of the year

- 1989 – Sean Elliott
- 1997 – Mike Bibby
- 1999 – Jason Terry
- 2000 – Jason Gardner

Frank Hessler Award

- 2000 – Loren Woods

NCAA Regionals most outstanding player

- 1997 – Miles Simon

Wayman Tisdale Award

- 2000 – Jason Gardner

Julius Erving Award

- 2015 – Stanley Johnson

Karl Malone Award

- 2018 – DeAndre Ayton

==== Pac-12/Big 12 player of the year (AP, UPI, Coaches) ====
The following is a list of Arizona Wildcats men's basketball players who have been named Pac-12 Player of the Year/Big 12 Conference Player of the Year:

- 1988 – Sean Elliott
- 1989 – Sean Elliott
- 1993 – Chris Mills
- 1995 – Damon Stoudamire
- 1998 – Mike Bibby
- 1999 – Jason Terry
- 2011 – Derrick Williams
- 2014 – Nick Johnson
- 2018 – Deandre Ayton
- 2022 – Bennedict Mathurin
- 2024 – Caleb Love
- 2026 – Jaden Bradley

==== Pac-12/Big 12 freshman of the year (AP, Coaches) ====
The following is a list of Arizona Wildcats men's basketball players who have been named either Pac-12 Freshman of the Year (awarded by the league's head coaches, and open only to freshmen) or Pac-12 Newcomer of the Year (awarded by the AP and open to any player in his first year at an Pac-12 school, including transfers).

- 1986 – Sean Elliott
- 1997 – Mike Bibby
- 1999 – Michael Wright
- 2002 – Salim Stoudamire
- 2007 – Chase Budinger
- 2010 – Derrick Williams
- 2014 – Aaron Gordon
- 2015 – Stanley Johnson
- 2018 – Deandre Ayton
- 2020 – Zeke Nnaji

==== Pac-12 6th Man of the Year/Big 12 6th Man of the Year ====
- 2021 – Jordan Brown
- 2022 – Pelle Larsson
- 2026 – Tobe Awaka

==== Pac-12 Defensive Player of the Year ====
- 2022 – Christian Koloko

==== Pac-12/Big 12 Most Improved Player of the Year ====
- 2022 – Christian Koloko
- 2023 – Oumar Ballo

==== Pac-12/Big 12 Scholar Athlete of the Year ====
- 2020: Stone Gettings

==== Pac-12 Tournament MOPs/Big 12 Most Outstanding Player ====
- 1988: Sean Elliott
- 1989: Sean Elliott (2)
- 1990: Jud Buechler
- 2002: Luke Walton
- 2005: Salim Stoudamire
- 2015: Brandon Ashley
- 2017: Allonzo Trier
- 2018: Deandre Ayton
- 2022: Bennedict Mathurin
- 2023: Ąžuolas Tubelis
- 2026: Jaden Bradley

=== Coaches ===
==== National Coach of the Year ====
- Lute Olson – 1988, 1990

==== AP Coach of the Year ====
- Tommy Lloyd – 2022 (AP Coach of the Year)

==== NABC Coach of the Year ====
- Tommy Lloyd – 2022(NABC Coach of the Year)

==== Naismith Coach of the Year ====
- Tommy Lloyd – 2026(Naismith College Coach of the Year)

==== USBWA Coach of the Year ====
- Tommy Lloyd – 2022(USBWA Coach of the Year)

==== Sporting News Coach of the Year ====
- Tommy Lloyd – 2026 (Sporting News Coach of the Year)

==== WAC Coach of the Year ====
- Fred Snowden – 1972

==== John R. Wooden Legends of Coaching Award ====
- Lute Olson – 2002

==== Clair Bee Coach of the Year Award ====
- Lute Olson – 2001

==== Pac-12 Coach of the Year/Big 12 Coach of the Year ====
- Lute Olson – 1986
- Lute Olson – 1988
- Lute Olson – 1989
- Lute Olson – 1993
- Lute Olson – 1994
- Lute Olson – 1998
- Lute Olson – 2003
- Sean Miller – 2011
- Sean Miller – 2014
- Sean Miller – 2017
- Tommy Lloyd – 2022
- Tommy Lloyd – 2026

== Hall of Fame inductees ==
The National Collegiate Basketball Hall of Fame has commemorated many of the sport's most outstanding and most innovative personalities. Among them are one former Arizona players and one former Arizona head coaches.

=== College Basketball Hall of Fame ===
Players

- Sean Elliott (2018)

Coaches

- Lute Olson (2002, 2006)

== Retired numbers ==
To have his number retired, a player must win one of the following six widely recognized player of the year awards:

- Associated Press Player of the Year
- Oscar Robertson Trophy, formerly known as the United States Basketball Writers Association National Player of the Year
- National Association of Basketball Coaches Player of the Year
- Sporting News Player of the Year
- John R. Wooden Award
- Naismith College Player of the Year
- NCAA basketball tournament Most Outstanding Player
- USBWA National Freshman of the Year

Players:

- #10 Mike Bibby (1996–98)
- #22 Jason Gardner (1999–03)
- #25 Steve Kerr (1983–88)
- #32 Sean Elliott (1985–89)
- #31 Jason Terry (1995–99)
- #34 Miles Simon (1994–98)

== McDonald's All-Americans ==
The following 28 McDonald's All-Americans listed below have signed with Arizona. An asterisk, "*", Indicates player did not finish his college career at Arizona. A cross, "†", indicates player did not begin his college career at Arizona.

1970–1999

- 1984 – Craig McMillan
- 1985 – Sean Elliott
- 1987 – Brian Williams
- 1988 – Chris Mills†
- 1990 – Khalid Reeves
- 1991 – Ben Davis†
- 1996 – Mike Bibby
- 1996 – Loren Woods†
- 1998 – Richard Jefferson
- 1999 – Jason Gardner

2000–2019

- 2002 – Hassan Adams
- 2003 – Mustafa Shakur
- 2004 – Jawann McClellan
- 2006 – Chase Budinger
- 2007 – Jerryd Bayless
- 2012 – Brandon Ashley & Grant Jerrett
- 2013 – Rondae Hollis-Jefferson & Aaron Gordon
- 2014 – Stanley Johnson
- 2015 – Chase Jeter† & Allonzo Trier
- 2016 – Kobi Simmons
- 2017 – Deandre Ayton
- 2018 – Jordan Brown†
- 2019 – Josh Green & Nico Mannion

2020–present

- 2020 - Caleb Love†
- 2022 - Jaden Bradley†
- 2024 - Carter Bryant
- 2025 - Koa Peat & Brayden Burries
- 2026 - Caleb Holt

=== McDonald's All-American Game MVPs ===
- 2006 – Chase Budinger
- 2013 – Aaron Gordon
- 2026 – Caleb Holt

== Olympians ==
The following Arizona Wildcats men's basketball players have represented their country in basketball in the Summer Olympics:

Year	Player	Country	Location	Medal
1984	Leon Wood	United States	Los Angeles	Gold
2004	Richard Jefferson	United States	Athens	Bronze
2012	Andre Iguodala	United States	London	Gold
2020	Nico Mannion	Italy	Tokyo	5th Place
2020	Josh Green	Australia	Tokyo	Bronze
2024	Josh Green	Australia	Paris	7th Place
2024	Chase Budinger	United States	Paris	T-9th Place
U of A Olympians

== NBA champions ==
The following Arizona Wildcats men's basketball players have gone on to win an NBA championship. A Total of 33 NBA championships have been won by 15 former Wildcats players.

Player (College Years)	Finals Year	Team
Bret Brielmaier (2004–08)	2016*	Cleveland Cavaliers*
Jud Buechler (1986–90)	1996, 1997, 1998	Chicago Bulls (3)
Quinton Crawford (2011–13)	2020*	Los Angeles Lakers*
Bison Dele (1988–91)	1997	Chicago Bulls
Sean Elliott (1984–89)	1999	San Antonio Spurs
Bruce Fraser (1984–87)	2015*, 2017* 2018*, 2022*	Golden State Warriors (4)
Channing Frye (2001–05)	2016	Cleveland Cavaliers
Andre Iguodala (2002–04)	2015, 2017, 2018, 2022	Golden State Warriors (4)
Richard Jefferson (1998–01)	2016	Cleveland Cavaliers
Steve Kerr (1983–88)	1996, 1997, 1998, 1999, 2003, 2015*, 2017*, 2018*, 2022*	Chicago Bulls (3), San Antonio Spurs (2), Golden State Warriors (4)*
Miles Simon (1994–98)	2020*	Los Angeles Lakers*
Jason Terry (1995–99)	2011	Dallas Mavericks
Luke Walton (1999-03)	2009, 2010, 2015*	Los Angeles Lakers (2), Golden State Warriors*
Aaron Gordon (2013–14)	2023	Denver Nuggets
Zeke Nnaji (2019–20)	2023	Denver Nuggets

Note: *Coach or Assistant coach

== Glossary ==
Abbreviations
Positions		Selectors							
G	Guard	ABA	ABAUSA	AP	Associated Press	AW	American Weekly	BA	Basketball America
F	Forward	BN	Basketball News	BT	Basketball Times	BW	Basketball Weekly	CBS	CBS
C	Center	CBSS	CBS Sportline	CNVR	Converse	COL	Collier's Weekly	CP	Central Press Association
		ESPN	ESPN	FOX	FOX	HLMS	Helms Foundation	INS	International News Service
		JW	John Wooden Team	NABC	National Association of Basketball Coaches	NAIS	Naismith	NBACO	NBA Coaches
		NEA	Newspaper Enterprise Association	RA	Rupp Award	SI	Sports Illustrated	TSN	The Sporting News
		UP	United Press	UPI	United Press International	USBWA	United States Basketball Writers Association		
