= List of Arizona Wildcats men's basketball seasons =

This is a list of the seasons completed by the Arizona Wildcats men's basketball team from their first season in 1904 to present.

== History ==
Overall
Years of basketball	122
First season	1904
Head coaches (all-time)	18
All Games
All-time record	2,022–1,004–1 (.668)
5+ win seasons	108
10+ win seasons	92
15+ win seasons	65
20+ win seasons	43
25+ win seasons	23
30+ win seasons	8
35+ win seasons	2
Home Games
McKale Center	718–125 (.852)
Bear Down Gym	247–24 (.911)
Pac-12 Games
All Time Pac-12 Regular Season Record	603–263 (.697)
All Time Pac-12 Tournament Record	42–16 (.724)†
All Time Pac-12 tournament championship Record	9–4 (.692)†
All Time Pac-12 tournament championship wins	9†
Conference Regular Season Championships	31 (1932, 1933, 1936, 1940, 1943, 1946, 1947, 1948, 1949, 1950, 1951, 1953, 1976, 1986, 1988, 1989, 1990, 1991, 1993, 1994, 1998, 2000, 2003, 2005, 2011, 2014, 2015, 2017†, 2018†, 2022, 2024)
Conference tournament championships	9 (1988, 1989, 1990, 2002, 2015, 2017†, 2018†, 2022, 2023)
Big 12 Games
All Time Big 12 Regular Season Record	30–8 (.789)
All Time Big 12 Tournament Record	5–1 (.833)
All Time Big 12 tournament championship Record	1–1 (.500)
All Time Big 12 tournament championship wins	1
Conference Regular Season Championships	1 (2026)
Conference tournament championships	1 (2026)
NCAA Tournament
NCAA Appearances	40 (1951, 1976, 1977, 1985, 1986, 1987, 1988, 1989, 1990, 1991, 1992, 1993, 1994, 1995, 1996, 1997, 1998, 1999*, 2000, 2001, 2002, 2003, 2004, 2005, 2006, 2007, 2008*, 2009, 2011, 2013, 2014, 2015, 2016, 2017†, 2018†, 2022, 2023, 2024, 2025, 2026)
NCAA W-L record	66–39 (.629)
Sweet Sixteen	23 (1951, 1976, 1988, 1989, 1991, 1994, 1996, 1997, 1998, 2001, 2002, 2003, 2005, 2009, 2011, 2013, 2014, 2015, 2017†, 2022, 2024, 2025, 2026)
Elite Eight	12 (1976, 1988, 1994, 1997, 1998, 2001, 2003, 2005, 2011, 2014, 2015, 2026)
Final Four	5 (1988, 1994, 1997, 2001, 2026)
NCAA Championship Games	2 (1997, 2001)
NCAA Championship Runner-up	1 (2001)
NCAA Championships	1 (1997)
Other Championships
N.I.T. Championships	none
Accurate as of 3/20/2026

† Arizona vacated all tournament wins and 2017, 2018 titles due to NCAA penalty (Arizona’s revised all-time tournament record is 32–15 (.681)).

== Key ==
National Champions	Conference Tournament Champions	Conference Regular Season Champions	Regular Season and Conference Tournament Champions

== Season-by-season records ==
The following is a list of Arizona Wildcats men's basketball seasons, with records and notable accomplishments.

Record table
Season	Coach	Overall	Conference	Standing	Postseason
Orin A. Kates (Independent) (1904–1906)
1904–05	Orin A. Kates	1–0–1			
1905–06	Orin A. Kates	Intra Squad			
Independent (1906–1911)
1906–07	–	3–1			
1907–08	–	1–2			
1908–09	–	1–1			
1909–10	–	2–2			
1910–11	–	3–0			
Frank L. Kleeberger (Independent) (1911–1912)
1911–12	Frank L. Kleeberger	2–2			
Raymond Quigley (Independent) (1912–1914)
1912–13	Raymond Quigley	3–2			
1913–14	Raymond Quigley	7–2			
Pop McKale (Independent) (1914–1921)
1914–15	Pop McKale	9–0			
1915–16	Pop McKale	5–0			
1916–17	Pop McKale	10–2			
1917–18	Pop McKale	3–2			
1918–19	Pop McKale	6–3			
1919–20	Pop McKale	9–5			
1920–21	Pop McKale	7–0			
James Pierce (Independent) (1921–1923)
1921–22	James Pierce	10–2			
1922–23	James Pierce	17–3			
Basil Stanley (Independent) (1923–1924)
1923–24	Basil Stanley	14–3			
Walter Davis (Independent) (1924–1925)
1924–25	Walter Davis	7–4			
Fred Enke (Independent) (1925–1931)
1925–26	Fred Enke	6–7			
1926–27	Fred Enke	13–4			
1927–28	Fred Enke	13–3			
1928–29	Fred Enke	19–4			
1929–30	Fred Enke	15–6			
1930–31	Fred Enke	9–6			
Fred Enke (Border Conference) (1931–1961)
1931–32	Fred Enke	18–2	8–2	1st	
1932–33	Fred Enke	19–5	7–3	1st	
1933–34	Fred Enke	18–9	9–3	2nd	
1934–35	Fred Enke	11–8	5–7	4th	
1935–36	Fred Enke	16–7	11–5	1st	
1936–37	Fred Enke	14–11	9–7	3rd	
1937–38	Fred Enke	13–8	9–7	2nd	
1938–39	Fred Enke	12–11	8–10	5th	
1939–40	Fred Enke	15–10	12–4	1st	
1940–41	Fred Enke	11–7	9–6	2nd	
1941–42	Fred Enke	9–13	6–10	6th	
1942–43	Fred Enke	22–2	16–2	T–1st	
1943–44	Fred Enke	12–2	–	–	
1944–45	Fred Enke	7–11	3–4	6th	
1945–46	Fred Enke	25–5	14–3	1st	NIT Quarterfinal
1946–47	Fred Enke	21–3	14–2	1st	
1947–48	Fred Enke	19–10	12–4	1st	
1948–49	Fred Enke	17–11	13–3	1st	
1949–50	Fred Enke	26–5	14–2	1st	NIT First Round
1950–51	Fred Enke	24–6	15–1	1st	NCAA Sweet Sixteen; NIT First Round
1951–52	Fred Enke	11–16	6–8	T–3rd	
1952–53	Fred Enke	13–11	11–3	T–1st	
1953–54	Fred Enke	14–10	8–4	3rd	
1954–55	Fred Enke	8–17	3–9	6th	
1955–56	Fred Enke	11–15	6–6	5th	
1956–57	Fred Enke	13–13	5–5	3rd	
1957–58	Fred Enke	10–15	4–6	T–4th	
1958–59	Fred Enke	4–22	1–9	6th	
1959–60	Fred Enke	10–14	4–6	4th	
1960–61	Fred Enke	11–15	5–5	3rd	
Bruce Larson (Independent) (1961–1962)
1961–62	Bruce Larson	12–14			
Bruce Larson (Western Athletic Conference) (1962–1972)
1962–63	Bruce Larson	13–13	3–7	T–5th	
1963–64	Bruce Larson	15–11	4–6	4th	
1964–65	Bruce Larson	17–9	5–5	T–2nd	
1965–66	Bruce Larson	15–11	5–5	3rd	
1966–67	Bruce Larson	8–17	3–7	5th	
1967–68	Bruce Larson	11–13	4–6	T–4th	
1968–69	Bruce Larson	17–10	5–5	3rd	
1969–70	Bruce Larson	12–14	8–6	4th	
1970–71	Bruce Larson	10–16	3–11	8th	
1971–72	Bruce Larson	6–20	4–10	7th	
Fred Snowden (Western Athletic Conference) (1972–1978)
1972–73	Fred Snowden	16–10	9–5	T–2nd	
1973–74	Fred Snowden	19–7	9–5	T–2nd	
1974–75	Fred Snowden	22–7	9–5	T–2nd	NCIT Runner–up
1975–76	Fred Snowden	24–9	11–3	1st	NCAA Division I Elite Eight
1976–77	Fred Snowden	21–6	10–4	2nd	NCAA Division I First Round
1977–78	Fred Snowden	15–11	6–8	T–4th	
Fred Snowden (Pac–10 Conference) (1978–1982)
1978–79	Fred Snowden	16–11	10–8	T–4th	
1979–80	Fred Snowden	12–15	6–12	6th	
1980–81	Fred Snowden	13–14	8–10	T–5th	
1981–82	Fred Snowden	9–18	4–14	T–8th	
Ben Lindsey (Pac–10 Conference) (1982–1983)
1982–83	Ben Lindsey	4–24	1–17	10th	
Lute Olson (Pac–10 Conference) (1983–2007)
1983–84	Lute Olson	11–17	8–10	8th	
1984–85	Lute Olson	21–10	12–6	T–3rd	NCAA Division I First Round
1985–86	Lute Olson	23–9	14–4	1st	NCAA Division I First Round
1986–87	Lute Olson	18–12	13–5	2nd	NCAA Division I First Round
1987–88	Lute Olson	35–3	17–1	1st	NCAA Division I Final Four
1988–89	Lute Olson	29–4	17–1	1st	NCAA Division I Sweet Sixteen
1989–90	Lute Olson	25–7	15–3	T–1st	NCAA Division I Second Round
1990–91	Lute Olson	28–7	14–4	1st	NCAA Division I Sweet Sixteen
1991–92	Lute Olson	24–7	13–5	3rd	NCAA Division I First Round
1992–93	Lute Olson	24–4	17–1	1st	NCAA Division I First Round
1993–94	Lute Olson	29–6	14–4	1st	NCAA Division I Final Four
1994–95	Lute Olson	24–7	14–4	2nd	NCAA Division I First Round
1995–96	Lute Olson	27–6	14–4	2nd	NCAA Division I Sweet Sixteen
1996–97	Lute Olson	25–9	11–7	5th	NCAA Division I champion
1997–98	Lute Olson	30–5	17–1	1st	NCAA Division I Elite Eight
1998–99	Lute Olson	22–7^{[Note A]}	13–5	2nd	NCAA Division I First Round
1999–00	Lute Olson	27–7	15–3	T–1st	NCAA Division I Second Round
2000–01	Lute Olson; Jim Rosborough	28–8	15–3	2nd	NCAA Division I Runner–up
2001–02	Lute Olson	24–10	12–6	T–2nd	NCAA Division I Sweet Sixteen
2002–03	Lute Olson	28–4	17–1	1st	NCAA Division I Elite Eight
2003–04	Lute Olson	20–10	11–7	3rd	NCAA Division I First Round
2004–05	Lute Olson	30–7	15–3	1st	NCAA Division I Elite Eight
2005–06	Lute Olson	20–13	11–7	T–4th	NCAA Division I Second Round
2006–07	Lute Olson	20–11	11–7	T–3rd	NCAA Division I First Round
Kevin O'Neill (Pac–10 Conference) (2007–2008)
2007–08	Kevin O'Neill	19–15^{[Note B]}	8–10^{[Note B]}	7th	NCAA Division I First Round
Russ Pennell (Pac–10 Conference) (2008–2009)
2008–09	Russ Pennell	21–14	9–9	T–5th	NCAA Division I Sweet Sixteen
Sean Miller (Pac–10/ Pac–12 Conference) (2009–2021)
2009–10	Sean Miller	16–15	10–8	4th	
2010–11	Sean Miller	30–8	14–4	1st	NCAA Division I Elite Eight
2011–12	Sean Miller	23–12	12–6	4th	NIT First Round
2012–13	Sean Miller	27–8	12–6	T–2nd	NCAA Division I Sweet Sixteen
2013–14	Sean Miller	33–5	15–3	1st	NCAA Division I Elite Eight
2014–15	Sean Miller	34–4	16–2	1st	NCAA Division I Elite Eight
2015–16	Sean Miller	25–9	12–6	3rd	NCAA Division I First Round
2016–17	Sean Miller	32–5^{[Note C]}	16–2^{[Note C]}	T–1st	NCAA Division I Sweet Sixteen
2017–18	Sean Miller	27–8^{[Note D]}	14–4^{[Note D]}	1st	NCAA Division I First Round
2018–19	Sean Miller	17–15	8–10	9th	
2019–20	Sean Miller	21–11	10–8	5th	No postseason held
2020–21	Sean Miller	17–9	11–9	5th	Ineligible
Tommy Lloyd (Pac–12 Conference/Big 12 Conference) (2021–present)
2021–22	Tommy Lloyd	33–4	18–2	1st	NCAA Division I Sweet Sixteen
2022–23	Tommy Lloyd	28–7	14–6	T–2nd	NCAA Division I First Round
2023–24	Tommy Lloyd	27–9	15–5	1st	NCAA Sweet Sixteen
2024–25	Tommy Lloyd	24–13	14–6	T–3rd	NCAA Sweet Sixteen
2025–26	Tommy Lloyd	36–3	16–2	1st	NCAA Final Four
2026–27	Tommy Lloyd	4–1	0–0		
Total:		2,022–1,004–1 (.668)	993–513 (.659)		
National champion Postseason invitational champion Conference regular season champion Conference regular season and conference tournament champion Division regular season champion Division regular season and conference tournament champion Conference tournament champion

^A. Arizona finished with a 22–7 overall record for the 1998–99 season, but the NCAA later vacated Arizona's appearance in the NCAA Tournament, resulting in an official season record of 22–6.
^B. Arizona finished with a 19–15 overall record and an 8–10 record in Pac-10 play for the 2007–08 season, but NCAA later vacated all of Arizona's 19 wins and its NCAA Tournament appearance, resulting in an official season record of 0–14.
^C. Arizona finished with a 32–5 overall record and an 16–2 record in Pac-12 play for the 2016–17 season, but NCAA later vacated all of Arizona's 32 wins, its regular & conference season title, NCAA Tournament appearance, resulting in an official season record of 0–5 and 0–2 in conference play.
^D. Arizona finished with a 27–8 overall record and an 14–4 record in Pac-12 play for the 2017–18 season, but NCAA later vacated 18 wins, its regular & conference season title, NCAA Tournament appearance, resulting in an official season record of 9–8 and 3–4 in conference play.
