= 1912 Wyoming Cowboys football team =

American college football season

1912 Wyoming Cowboys football
- Conference: Rocky Mountain Conference
- Record: 2–7 (0–5 RMC)
- Head coach: Leon Exelby (1st season)
- Captain: S. M. Fuller

1912 Rocky Mountain Conference football standings
	Conf.					Overall
Team	W		L		T	W		L		T
Colorado Mines +	5	–	1	–	0	9	–	1	–	0
Utah +	4	–	1	–	0	5	–	1	–	1
Colorado	3	–	2	–	0	6	–	3	–	0
Colorado Agricultural	3	–	2	–	0	3	–	2	–	0
Colorado College	2	–	4	–	0	5	–	4	–	0
Denver	1	–	3	–	0	2	–	6	–	1
Wyoming	0	–	5	–	0	2	–	7	–	0
+ – Conference co-champions

The 1912 Wyoming Cowboys football team was an American football team that represented the University of Wyoming as a member of the Rocky Mountain Conference (RMC) during the 1912 college football season. In their first and only season under head coach Leon Exelby, the Cowboys compiled a 2–7 record (0–5 against conference opponents), finished last out of seven teams in the RMC, and outscored opponents by a total of 291 to 64. For the second consecutive year, S. M. Fuller was the team captain.

== Schedule ==
Date	Opponent	Site	Result	Source
October 5	at Utah	Cummings Field; Salt Lake City, UT	L 0–9	
October 12	at Colorado College	Washburn Field; Colorado Springs, CO	L 0–35	
October 19	at Colorado	Gamble Field; Boulder, CO	L 0–75	
October 26	at Colorado Mines	Golden, CO	L 0–42	
November 2	at Utah Agricultural*	Logan, UT (rivalry)	L 0–53	
November 9	South Dakota Mines*	Laramie, WY	W 14–3	
November 16	Chadron Normal*	Laramie, WY	W 25–0	
November 23	Kearney Normal*	Laramie, WY	L 25–41	
November 28	Colorado Agricultural	Laramie, WY (rivalry)	L 0–33	
*Non-conference game
