= 1912 Montana Agricultural football team =

American college football season

1912 Montana Agricultural football
- Conference: Independent
- Record: 0–2
- Head coach: Earnest A. Dockstader (2nd season)
- Home stadium: Fairgrounds

1912 Western college football independents records
	Conf.			Overall
Team	W	L	T	W		L		T
New Mexico A&M		–		5	–	1	–	0
Utah Agricultural		–		4	–	2	–	1
Arizona		–		2	–	1	–	0
Montana		–		4	–	3	–	0
Cheney Normal		–		0	–	1	–	0
Montana Agricultural		–		0	–	2	–	0
New Mexico		–		0	–	4	–	0

The 1912 Montana Agricultural football team was an American football team that represented the Agricultural College of the State of Montana (later renamed Montana State University) during the 1912 college football season. Led by Earnest A. Dockstader his second season as head coach, they had a 0–2 record.

== Schedule ==
Date	Opponent	Site	Result	Source
October 19	Montana	Fairgrounds; Bozeman, MT (rivalry)	L 0–7	
November 9	at Montana	Dornblaser Field; Missoula, MT	L 3–39	
