= 1912 University of New Mexico football team =

American college football season

1912 University of New Mexico football
- Conference: Independent
- Record: 0–4
- Head coach: Ralph Hutchinson (2nd season)

1912 Western college football independents records
	Conf.			Overall
Team	W	L	T	W		L		T
New Mexico A&M		–		5	–	1	–	0
Utah Agricultural		–		4	–	2	–	1
Arizona		–		2	–	1	–	0
Montana		–		4	–	3	–	0
Cheney Normal		–		0	–	1	–	0
Montana Agricultural		–		0	–	2	–	0
New Mexico		–		0	–	4	–	0

The 1912 University of New Mexico football team was an American football team that represented the University of New Mexico as an independent during the 1912 college football season. In its second season under head coach Ralph Hutchinson (who was also the university's first athletic director), the team compiled a 0–4 record and was outscored by a total of 76 to 15. H.A. Carlisle was the team captain.

== Schedule ==
Date	Opponent	Site	Result	Attendance	Source
November 2	at New Mexico Military	Roswell, NM	L 0–20		
November 9	Albuquerque Indian School	Albuquerque, NM	L 6–7		
November 16	New Mexico A&M	Albuquerque, NM (rivalry)	L 0–27		
November 28	at Arizona	University of Arizona athletic field; Tucson, AZ (rivalry)	L 9–22	1,500	
