= 1912 Colorado Silver and Gold football team =

American college football season

1912 Colorado Silver and Gold football
- Conference: Rocky Mountain Conference
- Record: 6–3 (3–2 RMC)
- Head coach: Fred Folsom (12th season)
- Captain: Warren Hartman
- Home stadium: Gamble Field

1912 Rocky Mountain Conference football standings
	Conf.					Overall
Team	W		L		T	W		L		T
Colorado Mines +	5	–	1	–	0	9	–	1	–	0
Utah +	4	–	1	–	0	5	–	1	–	1
Colorado Agricultural	3	–	2	–	0	3	–	2	–	0
Colorado	2	–	2	–	0	6	–	3	–	0
Colorado College	2	–	4	–	0	5	–	4	–	0
Denver	1	–	3	–	0	2	–	6	–	1
Wyoming	0	–	5	–	0	2	–	7	–	0
+ – Conference co-champions

The 1912 Colorado Silver and Gold football team was an American football team that represented the University of Colorado as a member of the Rocky Mountain Conference (RMC) during the 1912 college football season. Head coach Fred Folsom led the team to a 3–2 mark in the RMC and 6–3 overall.

== Schedule ==
Date	Opponent	Site	Result	Source
September 28	Colorado alumni*	Gamble Field; Boulder, CO	W 20–0	
October 5	Utah Agricultural*	Gamble Field; Boulder, CO	W 16–3	
October 12	at Colorado Agricultural	Colorado Field; Fort Collins, CO (rivalry)	L 0–21	
October 19	Wyoming	Gamble Field; Boulder, CO	W 75–0	
November 2	at Colorado College	Washburn Field; Colorado Springs, CO	W 10–7	
November 9	Utah	Broadway Park; Denver, CO (rivalry)	W 3–0	
November 16	at Kansas State*	Ahearn Field; Manhattan, KS (rivalry)	L 6–14	
November 23	Colorado Mines	Gamble Field; Boulder, CO	L 3–24	
November 28	vs. Oklahoma*	Broadway Park; Denver, CO	W 14–12	
*Non-conference game
