= 1912 Colorado Agricultural Aggies football team =

American college football season

1912 Colorado Agricultural Aggies football
- Conference: Rocky Mountain Conference
- Record: 3–2 (3–2 RMC)
- Head coach: Harry W. Hughes (2nd season)
- Home stadium: Colorado Field

1912 Rocky Mountain Conference football standings
	Conf.					Overall
Team	W		L		T	W		L		T
Colorado Mines +	5	–	1	–	0	9	–	1	–	0
Utah +	4	–	1	–	0	5	–	1	–	1
Colorado Agricultural	3	–	2	–	0	3	–	2	–	0
Colorado	2	–	2	–	0	6	–	3	–	0
Colorado College	2	–	4	–	0	5	–	4	–	0
Denver	1	–	3	–	0	2	–	6	–	1
Wyoming	0	–	5	–	0	2	–	7	–	0
+ – Conference co-champions

The 1912 Colorado Agricultural Aggies football team represented Colorado Agricultural College (now known as Colorado State University) in the Rocky Mountain Conference (RMC) during the 1912 college football season. In their second season under head coach Harry W. Hughes, the Aggies compiled a 3–2 record, tied for third in the RMC, and outscored opponents by a total of 68 to 40.

== Schedule ==
Date	Opponent	Site	Result	Source
October 5	Denver	Colorado Field; Fort Collins, CO	W 14–13	
October 12	Colorado	Colorado Field; Fort Collins, CO (rivalry)	W 21–0	
October 19	at Colorado College	Colorado Springs, CO	L 0–13	
November 2	vs. Colorado Mines	Denver, CO	L 0–14	
November 28	at Wyoming	Laramie, WY (rivalry)	W 33–0	
