= Leon Exelby =

American football player and coach (1888–1962)

Biographical details
- Born: April 5, 1888; Britton, Michigan, U.S.
- Died: September 29, 1962; Owosso, Michigan, U.S.

Playing career

Football
- 1907–1910: Michigan Agricultural
- Position: Fullback

Coaching career (HC unless noted)

Football
- 1912: Wyoming

Basketball
- 1912–1913: Wyoming

Head coaching record
- Overall: 2–7 (football); 2–5 (basketball)

Leon C. "Ex" Exelby (April 5, 1888 – September 29, 1962) was an American football player and coach of football and basketball. He played college football at Michigan Agricultural College—now known as Michigan State University—from 1907 to 1910. He was captain of the 1910 Michigan Agricultural team. Playing as a fullback, he was selected by Walter Eckersall to the 1910 All-Western college football team. Exelby served as the head football coach at the University of Wyoming for one season in 1912, compiling a record of 2–7. He was also Wyoming's head basketball coach that academic year, 1912–13, tallying a mark of 2–5.

In 1935, Exelby was in charge of the Resettlement Administration in Shiawassee County, Michigan. He died of a heart attack, on September 29, 1962, in Owosso, Michigan.

== Head coaching record ==
=== Football ===
Year	Team	Overall	Conference	Standing	Bowl/playoffs
Wyoming Cowboys (Rocky Mountain Conference) (1912)
1912	Wyoming	2–7	0–5	7th	
Wyoming:		2–7	0–5		
Total:		2–7			
