= 1912 Montana Grizzlies football team =

American college football season

1912 Montana Grizzlies football
- Conference: Independent
- Record: 4–3
- Head coach: Wallace Philoon (1st season)
- Home stadium: Dornblaser Field

1912 Western college football independents records
	Conf.			Overall
Team	W	L	T	W		L		T
New Mexico A&M		–		5	–	1	–	0
Utah Agricultural		–		4	–	2	–	1
Arizona		–		2	–	1	–	0
Montana		–		4	–	3	–	0
Cheney Normal		–		0	–	1	–	0
Montana Agricultural		–		0	–	2	–	0
New Mexico		–		0	–	4	–	0

The 1912 Montana Grizzlies football team represented the University of Montana in the 1912 college football season. They were led by first-year head coach Wallace Philoon, played their home games at Dornblaser Field and finished the season with a record of four wins and three losses (4–3).

== Schedule ==
Date	Opponent	Site	Result	Source
October 5	Missoula High School	Dornblaser Field; Missoula, MT	W 28–0	
October 19	at Montana Agricultural	Bozeman, MT (rivalry)	W 7–0	
October 26	at Utah Agricultural	Logan, UT	L 0–17	
November 2	at Utah	Cummings Field; Salt Lake City, UT	L 3–10	
November 9	Montana Agricultural	Dornblaser Field; Missoula, MT	W 39–3	
November 23	at Gonzaga	Recreation Park; Spokane, WA	W 18–6	
November 28	at Willamette	Salem, OR	L 9–30	
