= 1912 Cheney Normal football team =

American college football season

1912 Cheney Normal football
- Conference: Independent
- Record: 0–1
- Head coach: Nick E. Hinch (2nd season)

1912 Western college football independents records
	Conf.			Overall
Team	W	L	T	W		L		T
New Mexico A&M		–		5	–	1	–	0
Utah Agricultural		–		4	–	2	–	1
Arizona		–		2	–	1	–	0
Montana		–		4	–	3	–	0
Cheney Normal		–		0	–	1	–	0
Montana Agricultural		–		0	–	2	–	0
New Mexico		–		0	–	4	–	0

The 1912 Cheney Normal football team represented the State Normal School at Cheney—now known as Eastern Washington University—as an independent during the 1912 college football season. Led by Albert Fertsch in his second and final season as head coach, Cheney Normal compiled a record of 0–1.

== Schedule ==
Date	Opponent	Site	Result	Source
November 20	Gonzaga second team	Cheney, WA	L 6–13	
