= 1912 Colorado Mines Orediggers football team =

American college football season

1912 Colorado Mines Orediggers football

RMC champion
- Conference: Rocky Mountain Conference
- Record: 9–1 (5–1 RMC)
- Head coach: William E. Johnston (1st season) & Erle Kristler (1st season)

1912 Rocky Mountain Conference football standings
	Conf.					Overall
Team	W		L		T	W		L		T
Colorado Mines +	5	–	1	–	0	9	–	1	–	0
Utah +	4	–	1	–	0	5	–	1	–	1
Colorado	3	–	2	–	0	6	–	3	–	0
Colorado Agricultural	3	–	2	–	0	3	–	2	–	0
Colorado College	2	–	4	–	0	5	–	4	–	0
Denver	1	–	3	–	0	2	–	6	–	1
Wyoming	0	–	5	–	0	2	–	7	–	0
+ – Conference co-champions

The 1912 Colorado Mines Orediggers football team was an American football team that represented the Colorado School of Mines in the Rocky Mountain Conference (RMC) during the 1912 college football season. The team compiled a 9–1 record and was champion of the RMC.

== Schedule ==
Date	Opponent	Site	Result	Source
September 28	Colorado Springs High*	Golden, CO	W 23–0	
October 12	Utah Agricultural*	Golden, CO	W 10–0	
October 19	vs. Wyoming	Denver, CO	W 42–0	
October 26	Utah	Golden, CO	L 3–18	
November 2	vs. Colorado Agricultural	Denver, CO	W 14–0	
November 9	at Colorado College	Colorado Springs, CO	W 17–7	
November 16	at Denver	Denver, CO	W 10–0	
November 23	at Colorado	Boulder, CO	W 24–3	
November 30	at Pomona*	Claremont, CA	W 13–0	
December 4	at Whittier*	Hadley Field; Whittier, CA	W 33–7	
*Non-conference game
