= 1912 Arizona football team =

American college football season

1912 Arizona football
- Conference: Independent
- Record: 2–1
- Head coach: Raymond L. Quigley (1st season)
- Captain: Richard L. Merritt

1912 Western college football independents records
	Conf.			Overall
Team	W	L	T	W		L		T
New Mexico A&M		–		5	–	1	–	0
Utah Agricultural		–		4	–	2	–	1
Arizona		–		2	–	1	–	0
Montana		–		4	–	3	–	0
Cheney Normal		–		0	–	1	–	0
Montana Agricultural		–		0	–	2	–	0
New Mexico		–		0	–	4	–	0

The 1912 Arizona football team was an American football team that represented the University of Arizona as an independent during the 1912 college football season. In its first and only season under head coach Raymond L. Quigley, the team compiled a 2–1 record and outscored its opponents by a total of 55 to 30. The team captain was Richard L Merritt.

== Schedule ==
Date	Opponent	Site	Result	Attendance	Source
October 12	Tucson High School	Tucson, AZ	W 19–0		
November 8	at New Mexico A&M	Las Cruces, NM	L 7–21		
November 28	New Mexico	University of Arizona athletic field; Tucson, AZ (rivalry)	W 22–9	1,500	
