= 1912 Utah Agricultural Aggies football team =

American college football season

1912 Utah Agricultural Aggies football
- Conference: Independent
- Record: 4–2–1
- Head coach: Clayton Teetzel (4th season)
- Home stadium: U.A.C. gridiron

1912 Western college football independents records
	Conf.			Overall
Team	W	L	T	W		L		T
New Mexico A&M		–		5	–	1	–	0
Utah Agricultural		–		4	–	2	–	1
Arizona		–		2	–	1	–	0
Montana		–		4	–	3	–	0
Cheney Normal		–		0	–	1	–	0
Montana Agricultural		–		0	–	2	–	0
New Mexico		–		0	–	4	–	0

The 1912 Utah Agricultural Aggies football team was an American football team that represented Utah Agricultural College (later renamed Utah State University) as an independent during the 1912 college football season. In their fourth season under head coach Clayton Teetzel, the Aggies compiled a 4–2–1 record and outscored opponents by a total of 154 to 40.

The team's 53–0 victory over Wyoming remains the largest margin of victory in the history of the Utah State–Wyoming football rivalry.

== Schedule ==
Date	Time	Opponent	Site	Result	Attendance	Source
October 5		at Colorado	Gamble Field; Boulder, CO	L 3–16		
October 12		at Colorado Mines	Campbell Field; Golden, CO	L 0–10		
October 26		Montana	U.A.C. gridiron; Logan, UT	W 17–0		
November 2		Wyoming	U.A.C. gridiron; Logan, UT	W 53–0		
November 9		U.A.C. alumni	U.A.C. gridiron; Logan, UT	W 30–0		
November 16		Logan All Stars	U.A.C. gridiron; Logan, UT	W 44–7		
November 28	2:30 p.m.	at Utah	Cummings Field; Salt Lake City, UT (rivalry)	T 7–7	12,500	
