= 1912 University of Utah football team =

American college football season

1912 University of Utah football

RMC co-champion
- Conference: Rocky Mountain Conference
- Record: 5–1–1 (4–1 RMC)
- Head coach: Fred Bennion (3rd season)
- Home stadium: Cummings Field

1912 Rocky Mountain Conference football standings
	Conf.					Overall
Team	W		L		T	W		L		T
Colorado Mines +	5	–	1	–	0	9	–	1	–	0
Utah +	4	–	1	–	0	5	–	1	–	1
Colorado Agricultural	3	–	2	–	0	3	–	2	–	0
Colorado	2	–	2	–	0	6	–	3	–	0
Colorado College	2	–	4	–	0	5	–	4	–	0
Denver	1	–	3	–	0	2	–	6	–	1
Wyoming	0	–	5	–	0	2	–	7	–	0
+ – Conference co-champions

The 1912 University of Utah football team was an American football team that represented the University of Utah as a member of the Rocky Mountain Conference (RMC) during the 1912 college football season. In its third season under head coach Fred Bennion, the team compiled an overall record of 5–1–1 with a mark of 4–1 against conference opponents, tied with Colorado Mines for the RMC championship, and outscored all opponents by a total of 153 to 16. The team played its home games at Cummings Field in Salt Lake City.

== Schedule ==
Date	Time	Opponent	Site	Result	Attendance	Source
October 5		Wyoming	Cummings Field; Salt Lake City, UT	W 9–0		
October 19		Denver	Cummings Field; Salt Lake City, UT	W 66–0		
October 26		at Colorado Mines	Brooks Field; Golden, CO	W 18–3		
November 2		Montana*	Cummings Field; Salt Lake City, UT	W 10–3		
November 9		at Colorado	Denver, CO (rivalry)	L 0–3		
November 16		Colorado College	Cummings Field; Salt Lake City, UT	W 43–0		
November 28	2:30 p.m.	Utah Agricultural*	Cummings Field; Salt Lake City, UT (rivalry)	T 7–7	12,500	
*Non-conference game
