= 1912 New Mexico A&M Aggies football team =

American college football season

1912 New Mexico A&M Aggies football
- Conference: Independent
- Record: 5–1
- Head coach: Art Badenoch (3rd season)
- Home stadium: Miller Field

1912 Western college football independents records
| | Conf. | | | Overall |
| Team | W | L | T | W | | L | | T |
|---|---|---|---|---|---|---|---|---|
| New Mexico A&M | | – | | 5 | – | 1 | – | 0 |
| Utah Agricultural | | – | | 4 | – | 2 | – | 1 |
| Arizona | | – | | 2 | – | 1 | – | 0 |
| Montana | | – | | 4 | – | 3 | – | 0 |
| Cheney Normal | | – | | 0 | – | 1 | – | 0 |
| Montana Agricultural | | – | | 0 | – | 2 | – | 0 |
| New Mexico | | – | | 0 | – | 4 | – | 0 |

The 1912 New Mexico A&M Aggies football team was an American football team that represented New Mexico College of Agriculture and Mechanical Arts (now known as New Mexico State University) during the 1912 college football season. In their third year under head coach Art Badenoch, the Aggies compiled a 5–1 record, shut out four opponents, and outscored all opponents by a total of 256 to 17. The team played home games on Miller Field, sometimes also referred to as College Field.

== Schedule ==
| Date | Opponent | Site | Result | Source |
|---|---|---|---|---|
| October 5 | El Paso High School | Las Cruces, NM | W 43–0 | |
| October 26 | El Paso Military Institute | Las Cruces, NM | W 42–0 | |
| November 2 | 2nd Cavalry, Fort Bliss | Las Cruces, NM | W 116–0 | |
| November 8 | Arizona | Las Cruces, NM | W 21–7 | |
| November 16 | at New Mexico | Albuquerque, NM (rivalry) | W 27–0 | |
| November 28 | New Mexico Military | Jones Field; Las Cruces, NM | L 0–10 | |
