= William E. Johnston (American football) =

American football player and sports coach

Playing career

Football
- 1903–1904: Colorado
- Position: Halfback

Coaching career (HC unless noted)

Football
- 1905–1908: Central University
- 1909–1910: Wooster
- 1912: Colorado Mines

Basketball
- ?–1909: Central University
- 1909–1911: Wooster
- 1911–1913: Colorado Mines

Baseball
- ?–1909: Central University
- 1910–1911: Wooster

Track and field
- ?–1909: Central University

Administrative career (AD unless noted)
- ?–1909: Central University

Head coaching record
- Overall: 32–25–5 (football)); 25–11 (basketball)

Accomplishments and honors

Championships
- Football; 1 RMC (1912)

William E. Johnston was an American college football, college basketball, college baseball, and track and field coach and athletics administrator. He served as the head football coach at Central University of Kentucky—now known as Centre College—in Danville, Kentucky from 1905 to 1908, the College of Wooster in Wooster, Ohio from 1909 to 1910, and the Colorado School of Mines in Golden, Colorado in 1912. During his time at Wooster, Johnston also served as the school's head basketball coach (1909–1911) and head baseball coach (1910–1911). Johnston served as the head basketball coach during his time Colorado Mines, from 1911 to 1913.

Johnston served as athletic director and coached football, basketball, baseball, and track and field at Central University before resigning in 1909 to move to Wooster. He was also the athletic director at Wooster until 1911, when he stepped down with plans to go into business with his father, the treasurer of the Denver Smelting and Refining Company.

== Head coaching record ==
=== Football ===
Year	Team	Overall	Conference	Standing	Bowl/playoffs
Central University (Independent) (1905–1908)
1905	Central University	5–2–2			
1906	Central University	7–1–1			
1907	Central University	4–5			
1908	Central University	5–4–1			
Central University:		21–12–4			
Wooster Presbyterians (Ohio Athletic Conference) (1909–1910)
1909	Wooster	1–6	1–5	9th	
1910	Wooster	1–6–1	1–4–1	9th	
Wooster:		2–12–1	2–9–1		
Colorado Mines Orediggers (Rocky Mountain Conference) (1912)
1912	Colorado Mines	9–1	5–1	T–1st	
Colorado Mines:		9–1	5–1		
Total:		32–25–5			
National championship Conference title Conference division title or championship game berth
