= Raymond L. Quigley =

American sports coach (1885–1958)

Biographical details
- Born: May 20, 1885; Princeton, Illinois, U.S.
- Died: March 9, 1958 (aged 72); Fresno, California, U.S.

Playing career

Football
- 1908: Chicago

Coaching career (HC unless noted)

Football
- 1910–1911: Northern Normal
- 1912: Arizona

Basketball
- 1912–1914: Arizona

Baseball
- 1913: Arizona

Administrative career (AD unless noted)
- 1910–1912: Northern Normal and Industrial
- 1912–1913: Arizona

Head coaching record
- Overall: 10–7 (football); 10–4 (basketball); 1–0 (baseball)

Raymond Leamore Quigley (May 20, 1885 – March 9, 1958) was an American football player, track athlete, coach in multiple sports, and athletics administrator. He served as the head football coach at Northern Normal and Industrial School in South Dakota—now known as Northern State University—from 1910 to 1911 and at the University of Arizona for one season in 1912, compiling a career college football coaching record of 10–7. Quigley was also the head basketball coach at Arizona for two seasons, from 1912 to 1914, tallying a mark of 10–4, and the head baseball coach at the school for one season in 1913. Quigley served as the playground superintendent for the city of Fresno, California from 1914 until his retirement in 1953.

== Playing career ==
Quigley attended the University of Chicago, where he played football and ran track under coach Amos Alonzo Stagg. He was the captain of the Chicago Maroons football team in 1908.

== Coaching career ==
Quigley was the head football coach at Northern Normal and Industrial School, now known as Northern State University, in Aberdeen, South Dakota for two seasons, 1910 and 1911, where he compiled a record of 8–6. He was also the school's athletic director during that time.

== Head coaching record ==
=== Football ===
Year	Team	Overall	Conference	Standing	Bowl/playoffs
Northern Normal (Independent) (1910–1911)
1910	Northern Normal	7–1			
1911	Northern Normal	1–5			
Northern Normal:		8–6			
Arizona (Independent) (1912)
1912	Arizona	2–1			
Arizona:		2–1			
Total:		10–7			
